= Tin Can Bay Road =

Road in Queensland, Australia

Tin Can Bay Road Queensland

General information
- Type: Road
- Length: 56.1 km (35 mi)
- Route number(s): Monkland – Canina; No shield: Canina – Tin Can Bay

Major junctions
- Southwest end: Bruce Highway
- Gympie Connection Road; Kin Kin Road; Maryborough–Cooloola Road; Rainbow Beach Road
- Northeast end: Esplanade, Tin Can Bay

Location(s)
- Major suburbs: Victory Heights, Canina, Goomboorian, Wallu

Tin Can Bay Road is a continuous 56.1 kilometres (34.9 mi) road route in the Gympie region of Queensland, Australia. Part of it is signed as State Route 15. It is a state-controlled road (number 143), part regional and part district, with the district section rated as a local road of regional significance (LRRS). It runs from the Bruce Highway in Monkland to the Esplanade in Tin Can Bay. It intersects with Gympie Connection Road in Victory Heights, Kin Kin Road in Canina, Maryborough–Cooloola Road in Wallu, and Rainbow Beach Road in Wallu.

== Route description ==
The road starts at an intersection with the Bruce Highway (A1) in Monkland. It runs northwest as Brisbane Road (State Route 15) before entering Gympie, turning north at an intersection with Red Hill Road and changing to Crescent Road. At an intersection with Cootharaba Road it turns northeast and enters Victory Heights where it soon becomes Tin Can Bay Road. As it leaves Victory Heights at a tripoint with Veteran and East Deep Creek it passes the exit to Gympie Connection Road to the northwest. The road soon enters Canina where it first passes the exit to Cedar Pocket Road to the southeast, and then the exit to Kin Kin Road to the east. It then turns north, ceasing to carry the State Route 15 shield.

Turning northeast it runs through Ross Creek to Goomboorian where it again turns north and passes the exit to Tagigan Road to the southeast. As it enters Toolara Forest lt turns northeast, passing through Toolara State Forest to Wallu. Here it passes the exit to Maryborough–Cooloola Road to the northwest before entering Tin Can Bay, where it passes the exit to Rainbow Beach Road to the southeast. The road continues northeast to the Esplanade in Tin Can Bay, where it ends.

=== Gympie Bypass ===
The Gympie Bypass, under construction in 2023, will become the Bruce Highway (M1) when completed. It will cross over Tin Can Bay Road in Victory Heights with no interchange. An interchange with Gympie Connection Road to the north will become the most direct route from the Bruce Highway to Tin Can Bay Road outbound.

== History ==
European settlement began at Tin Can Bay in the 1870s as the point where logs would be floated to the timber mills at Maryborough. Tin Can Bay later became, and still remains, an important fishing port, with a focus on prawns as well as recreational fishing.

Wolvi, just to the southeast of Tin Can Bay Road, was the site of the Tagigan pastoral run. In 1877, 8,360 acres (3,380 ha) of land were resumed from Tagigan. The land was offered for selection for the establishment of small farms on 17 April 1877.

== Intersecting state-controlled roads ==
This road intersects with the following state-controlled roads:

- Gympie Connection Road
- Kin Kin Road
- Maryborough–Cooloola Road
- Rainbow Beach Road

=== Gympie Connection Road ===
Gympie ConnectionRoad
- Location: Bruce Highway, Gympie to Tin Can Bay Road, Victory Heights
- Length: 6.3 km (3.9 mi)

Gympie Connection Road is a state-controlled district road (number 1411) rated as a local road of regional significance (LRRS). It runs from the Bruce Highway in Gympie to Tin Can Bay Road in Victory Heights, a distance of 6.3 kilometres (3.9 mi). This road has no major intersections.

=== Kin Kin Road ===
Kin Kin Road
- Location: Tin Can Bay Road, Canina to Cooroy Connection Road, Pomona
- Length: 54.4 km (33.8 mi)

Kin Kin Road is a state-controlled district road (number 141) rated as a local road of regional significance (LRRS). It runs from Tin Can Bay Road in Canina to Cooroy Connection Road in Pomona, via Kin Kin, a distance of 54.4 kilometres (33.8 mi). This road intersects with Boreen Road and Pomona Connection Road in Pomona.

A project to widen and upgrade sections of Kin Kin Road, at a cost of $19 million, was in the construction stage in August 2023. An engineering review of other sections of the road was conducted in 2022.

=== Rainbow Beach Road ===
Rainbow Beach Road
- Location: Tin Can Bay Road, Wallu to Kirchner Street, Rainbow Beach
- Length: 29.9 km (18.6 mi)

Rainbow Beach Road is a state-controlled district road (number 1413) rated as a local road of regional significance (LRRS). It runs from Tin Can Bay Road in Wallu to Kirchner Street in Rainbow Beach, a distance of 29.9 kilometres (18.6 mi). This road has no major intersections.

== Associated state-controlled roads ==
The following state-controlled roads are associated with the intersecting roads described above:

- Intersecting with Kin Kin Road:
  - Boreen Road
  - Pomona Connection Road
- Intersecting with Boreen Road:
  - Boreen Point–Tewantin Road

=== Boreen Road ===
Boreen Road
- Location: Kin Kin Road, Pomona to Lake Flat Road, Boreen Point
- Length: 17.1 km (10.6 mi)

Boreen Road is a state-controlled district road (number 1412) rated as a local road of regional significance (LRRS). It runs from Kin Kin Road in Pomona to Lake Flat Road in Boreen Point, a distance of 17.1 kilometres (10.6 mi). This road intersects with Boreen Point–Tewantin Road in Cootharaba.

=== Pomona Connection Road ===
Pomona Connection Road
- Location: Cooroy–Gympie Road, Pomona to Kin Kin Road (Factory Street), Pomona
- Length: 3.7 km (2.3 mi)

Pomona Connection Road is a state-controlled district road (number 1403) rated as a local road of regional significance (LRRS). It runs from Cooroy–Gympie Road (Old Bruce Highway) in Pomona to Kin Kin Road (Factory Street) in Pomona, a distance of 3.7 kilometres (2.3 mi). It has no major intersections.

=== Boreen Point–Tewantin Road ===
Boreen Point–Tewantin Road
- Location: Boreen Road (Louis Bazzo Drive), Cootharaba to McKinnon Drive, Tewantin
- Length: 13.4 km (8.3 mi)

Boreen Point–Tewantin Road is a state-controlled district road (number 1421) rated as a local road of regional significance (LRRS). It runs from Boreen Road (Louis Bazzo Drive) in Cootharaba to McKinnon Drive in Tewantin, a distance of 13.4 kilometres (8.3 mi). This road has no major intersections.

== Major intersections ==
All distances are from Google Maps. The entire road is within the Gympie local government area.

Location	km	mi	Destinations	Notes
Monkland	0	0.0	Bruce Highway – north – Gympie – south – Glanmire, Kybong	Road starts as Brisbane Road. It runs northwest as State Route 15.
Gympie	14.0	8.7	Red Hill Road – northwest – Gympie	Road turns north as Crescent Road
Gympie	16.3	10.1	Crescent Road – northwest – Gympie	Road turns northeast as Cootharaba Road / Tin Can Bay Road
Victory Heights, Veteran, East Deep Creek tripoint	35.7	22.2	Gympie Connection Road – northwest – Gympie, Bruce Highway	Road continues northeast as Tin Can Bay Road
Canina, Greens Creek midpoint	35.7	22.2	Cedar Pocket Road – southeast – Cedar Pocket	Road continues northeast
Canina	35.7	22.2	Kin Kin Road – east – Wolvi, Kin Kin, Pomona	Road turns north. Northern end of State Route 15.
Goomboorian	35.7	22.2	Tagigan Road – southeast – Wolvi	Road continues north
Toolara Forest, Wallu midpoint	35.7	22.2	Maryborough–Cooloola Road – northwest – Maryborough	Road continues northeast
Wallu	35.7	22.2	Rainbow Beach Road – southeast – Rainbow Beach	Road continues northeast
Tin Can Bay	39.0	24.2	Esplanade – northeast – Tin Can Bay	Northeastern end of Tin Can Bay Road
1.000 mi = 1.609 km; 1.000 km = 0.621 mi: Route transition

== See also ==
- List of numbered roads in Queensland
