= Victory Heights, Queensland =

Victory Heights
- Suburb
- Interactive map of Victory Heights
- Coordinates: 26.1763°S 152.6944°E
- Country: Australia
- State: Queensland
- LGA: Gympie Region
- Location: 3.4 km (2.1 mi) ENE of Gympie; 169 km (105 mi) N of Brisbane

Government
  - State electorate: Gympie
  - Federal division: Wide Bay

Area
  - Total: 5.1 km^{2} (2.0 sq mi)
- Elevation: 104 m (341 ft)

Population
  - Total: 486 (2021 census)
  - Density: 95.3/km^{2} (246.8/sq mi)
- Time zone: UTC+10:00 (AEST)
- Postcode: 4570
Suburbs around Victory Heights
Araluen	Veteran	Veteran
Gympie	Victory Heights	Mothar Mountain
Gympie	Monkland	East Deep Creek

Victory Heights is a rural residential locality in the Gympie Region, Queensland, Australia. In the 2021 census, Victory Heights had a population of 486 people.

== Geography ==
Victory Heights is 4 kilometres (2 mi) north-east of the centre of Gympie. Cootharaba Road / Tin Can Bay Road (State Route 15) passes through from south-west to north-east. The North Coast railway line passes through from south to north-west. The Gympie North railway station is in the north-west corner of the locality (26.1591°S 152.6825°E).

The land use is mostly rural residential with some pockets of grazing on native vegetation.

== Demographics ==
In the 2006 census, Victory Heights had a population of 394 people.

In the 2016 census, Victory Heights had a population of 555 people.

In the 2021 census, Victory Heights had a population of 486 people.

== Economy ==
Robertson Brothers Sawmills is at 30 Old Wolvi Road (26.1708°S 152.6838°E).

== Education ==
The nearest government primary schools are Gympie West State School in neighbouring Gympie to the west, One Mile State School in neighbouring Gympie to the south-west, and Gympie East State School in Greens Creek to the east. The nearest government secondary school is Gympie State High School in Gympie to the south-west.
