= North Deep Creek =

- Suburb
- Interactive map of North Deep Creek
- Coordinates: 26.0930°S 152.6902°E
- Country: Australia
- State: Queensland
- LGA: Gympie Region
- Location: 13.0 km (8.1 mi) NNE of Gympie; 187 km (116 mi) N of Brisbane

Government
  - State electorate: Gympie
  - Federal division: Wide Bay

Area
  - Total: 36.7 km^{2} (14.2 sq mi)

Population
  - Total: 388 (2021 census)
  - Density: 10.572/km^{2} (27.38/sq mi)
- Time zone: UTC+10:00 (AEST)
- Postcode: 4570
Suburbs around North Deep Creek
Curra	Anderleigh	Downsfield
Corella	North Deep Creek	Ross Creek
Tamaree	Banks Pocket	Veteran

North Deep Creek is a rural locality in the Gympie Region, Queensland, Australia. In the 2021 census, North Deep Creek had a population of 388 people.

== Geography ==
Butlers Knob is a mountain in the northernmost part of the locality (26.0565°S 152.6916°E), rising to 199 metres (653 ft) above sea level. It may be named after early selector James William Butler who purchased land to the north-east of the mountain (portion 855, parish of Goomboorian as recorded on plan M37395) on 12 February 1877.

Deep Creek (North Branch) rises in the north-east of the locality and meanders south and exits to the south-east (Veteran), from where it continues to meander south until it crosses into the locality of East Deep Creek where it becomes a tributary of Deep Creek.

The Bruce Highway passes through the southern part of the locality, entering from the south-east (Veteram) and exiting to the south-west (Tamaree), but it does not provide access to the locality. The main artery through the locality is North Deep Creek Road which enters from the south-east (Veteran) and winds its way north through the locality exiting to the north (Anderleigh).

The Gympie National Park occupies the north-east and south-east of the locality with the Gympie State Fores in the east. Apart from these protected areas, the land use is a mixture of grazing on native vegetation, rural residential housing, production forestry, and some crop growing.

== History ==
North Deep Creek Provisional School opened in 1921. By 1924, it had become North Deep Creek State School. It closed in 1967. It was at 256 Young Road (26.08497°S 152.68156°E).

== Demographics ==
In the 2016 census, North Deep Creek had a population of 392 people.

In the 2021 census, North Deep Creek had a population of 388 people.

== Education ==
There are no schools in North Deep Creek. The nearest government primary school is Chatsworth State School in Chatsworth to the south-west. The nearest government secondary schools are James Nash State High School and Gympie State High School, both in Gympie to the south.
