= Corella, Queensland =

Corella
- Suburb
- Interactive map of Corella
- Coordinates: 26.1125°S 152.6416°E
- Country: Australia
- State: Queensland
- LGA: Gympie Region
- Location: 6.5 km (4.0 mi) NE of Chatsworth; 10.7 km (6.6 mi) N of Gympie; 181 km (112 mi) N of Brisbane

Government
  - State electorate: Gympie
  - Federal division: Wide Bay

Area
  - Total: 13.7 km^{2} (5.3 sq mi)

Population
  - Total: 68 (2021 census)
  - Density: 4.96/km^{2} (12.86/sq mi)
- Time zone: UTC+10:00 (AEST)
- Postcode: 4570
Suburbs around Corella
Curra	Curra	North Deep Creek
Curra	Corella	North Deep Creek
Chatsworth	Chatsworth	Tamaree

Corella is a rural locality in the Gympie Region, Queensland, Australia. In the 2021 census, Corella had a population of 68 people.

== Geography ==
The North Coast railway line passes through the locality from the south-east (Tamaree) to the north-west (Curra). Most of the land to the west of the railway line is within the Curra State Forest which extends into Curra and Anderleigh. To the east of the railway line the land use is mostly grazing on native vegetation.

== History ==
Corella State School opened on 24 January 1927 and closed in 1940.

== Demographics ==
In the 2016 census, Corella had a population of 73 people.

In the 2021 census, Corella had a population of 68 people.

== Education ==
There are no schools in Corella. The nearest government primary school is Chatsworth State School in neighbouring Chatsworth to the south-west. The nearest government secondary school is James Nash State High School in Gympie to the south.
