= Downsfield =

- Suburb
- Interactive map of Downsfield
- Coordinates: 26.0472°S 152.7249°E
- Country: Australia
- State: Queensland
- LGA: Gympie Region
- Location: 18.7 km (11.6 mi) NE of Gympie; 192 km (119 mi) N of Brisbane

Government
  - State electorate: Gympie
  - Federal division: Wide Bay

Area
  - Total: 25.4 km^{2} (9.8 sq mi)

Population
  - Total: 86 (2021 census)
  - Density: 3.386/km^{2} (8.77/sq mi)
- Time zone: UTC+10:00 (AEST)
- Postcode: 4570
Suburbs around Downsfield
Anderleigh	Neerdie	Kia Ora
Anderleigh	Downsfield	Goomboorian
North Deep Creek	Ross Creek	Goomboorian

Downsfield is a rural locality in the Gympie Region, Queensland, Australia. In the 2021 census, Downsfield had a population of 86 people.

== History ==
Downsfield State School opened on 2 December 1918. It had a number of temporary closures over the years, closing finally on 29 August 1966. It was on a 5-acre (2.0 ha) site on the bend of Kenins Road (approx 26.04967°S 152.72079°E).

Sandy Creek Hall was sold in 2018.

== Demographics ==
In the 2016 census, Downsfield had a population of 94 people.

In the 2021 census, Downsfield had a population of 86 people.

== Heritage listings ==
Dagun has the following heritage site:

- Sandy Creek Hall, 1726 Sandy Creek Road (26.05375°S 152.72443°E)

== Education ==
There are no schools in Downsfield. The nearest government primary schools are Kia-Ora State School in neighbouring Kia Ora to the north-west and Gympie East State School in Greens Creek to the south. The nearest government secondary school is Gympie State High School in Gympie to the south-west.

There are also non-government schools in Gympie and its suburbs.
