= Anderleigh, Queensland =

Anderleigh
- Suburb
- Interactive map of Anderleigh
- Coordinates: 26.0125°S 152.6794°E
- Country: Australia
- State: Queensland
- LGA: Gympie Region
- Location: 30.7 km (19.1 mi) NNE of Gympie; 197 km (122 mi) N of Brisbane

Government
  - State electorate: Gympie
  - Federal division: Wide Bay

Area
  - Total: 47.8 km^{2} (18.5 sq mi)

Population
  - Total: 128 (2021 census)
  - Density: 2.678/km^{2} (6.94/sq mi)
- Time zone: UTC+10:00 (AEST)
- Postcode: 4570
Suburbs around Anderleigh
Glenwood	Neerdie	Neerdie
Gunalda	Anderleigh	Downsfield
Curra	North Deep Creek	Downsfield

Anderleigh is a rural locality in the Gympie Region, Queensland, Australia. In the 2021 census, Anderleigh had a population of 128 people.

== Geography ==
Anderleigh Road commences at the Bruce Highway in Gunalda and proceeds east through Gunalda until it enters the locality of Anderleigh from the west and travels roughly west to east through Anderleigh, terminating on the eastern boundary of the locality with Downsfield to the east.

The south-west of the locality is within the Curra State Forest which extends into neighbouring Curra to the south-west. Black Knob is a mountain in the south-west of the locality in the Curra State Forest (26.0316°S 152.6688°E) rising to 296 metres (971 ft) above sea level.

Apart from this protected area, the land use is mostly grazing on native vegetation with irrigated crop growing and horticulture.

== History ==
Brookleigh Provisional School opened on 10 July 1895. In 1899, it was renamed Anderleigh Provisional School. It became Anderleigh State School in 1909. It closed on 24 July 1960. It was on the land of present-day 1310 Anderleigh Road opposite the present-day rural fire station (approx 26.0008°S 152.6795°E).

Anderleigh Public Hall was erected opposite the school circa 1918 near the present-day rural fire station (approx 25.9998°S 152.6802°E). It is no longer extant.

== Demographics ==
In the 2011 census, Anderleigh was included with neighbouring Kia Ora and together had a population of 501 people.

In the 2016 census, Anderleigh had a population of 90 people.

In the 2021 census, Anderleigh had a population of 128 people.

== Education ==
There are no schools in Anderleigh. The nearest government primary schools are Kia-Ora State School in Kia Ora to the east, Gunalda State School in neighbouring Gundalda to the west, and Chatsworth State School in Chatsworth to the south-west. The nearest government secondary schools are Gympie State High School and James Nash State High School, both in Gympie to the south.
