= Tamaree, Queensland =

Tamaree
- Suburb
- Interactive map of Tamaree
- Coordinates: 26.1361°S 152.6638°E
- Country: Australia
- State: Queensland
- City: Gympie
- LGA: Gympie Region
- Location: 7.1 km (4.4 mi) N of Gympie; 175 km (109 mi) N of Brisbane

Government
  - State electorate: Gympie
  - Federal division: Wide Bay

Area
  - Total: 8.6 km^{2} (3.3 sq mi)

Population
  - Total: 1,000 (2021 census)
  - Density: 120/km^{2} (300/sq mi)
- Time zone: UTC+10:00 (AEST)
- Postcode: 4570
Suburbs around Tamaree
Corella	Corella	North Deep Creek
Chatsworth	Tamaree	North Deep Creek
Araluen	Banks Pocket	Veteran

Tamaree is a rural residential locality in the Gympie Region, Queensland, Australia. In the 2021 census, Tamaree had a population of 1,000 people.

== Geography ==
Tamaree is located 7 kilometres (4 mi) north of Gympie's central business district.

The locality is bounded to the west by Old Maryborough Road.

The North Coast railway line enters the locality from the south-west (Banks Pocket) and exits to the north (Corella). The locality is served by the Tamaree railway station (26.1308°S 152.6651°E).

The land use is rural residential.

== History ==
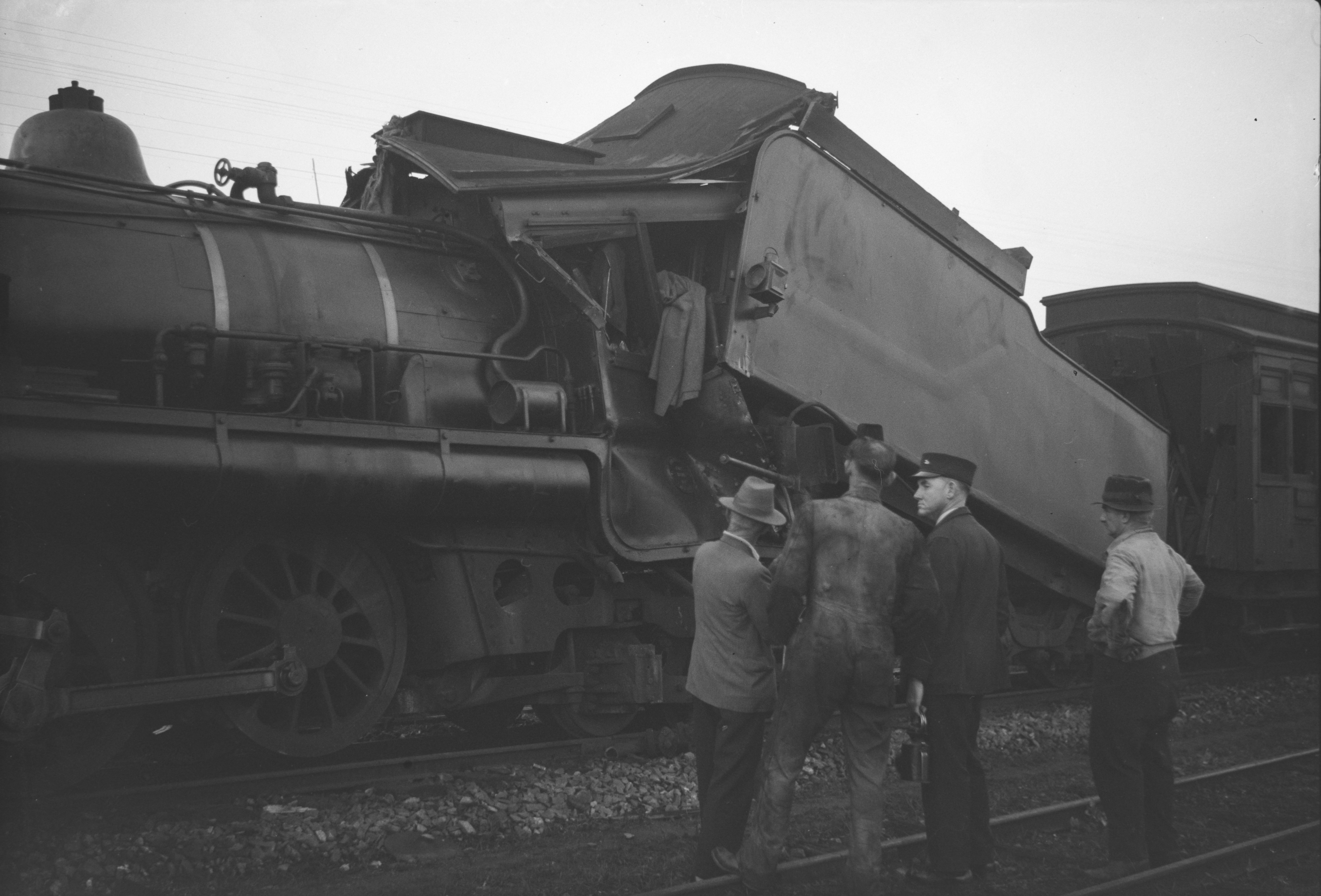
Railway workers looking at the damaged train tender after a crash at Tamaree, October 1947.jpg

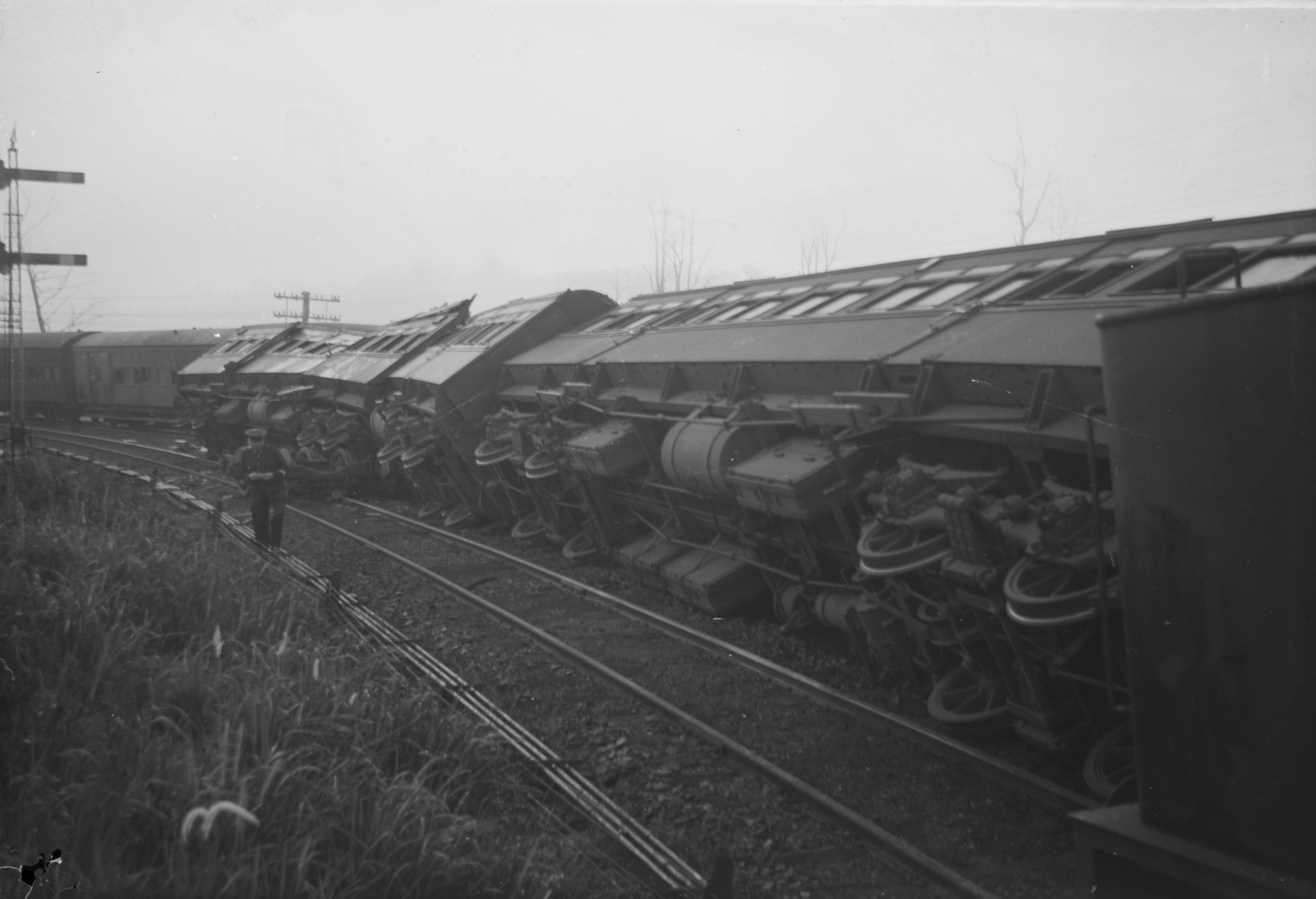
Railway engine and carriages on their sides on the track after being involved in a collision at Tamaree, October 1947

Tamaree Provisional School opened on 12 July 1904. On 1 January 1909 it became Tamaree State School. It closed on 31 March 1965.

On Saturday 18 October 1947 at Tamaree railway station, the north-bound Townsville mail train crashed head-on into the stationary south-bound train from Rockhampton, with both trains carrying hundreds of passengers. Two crew in the south-bound train were killed along with six passengers in the north-bound train.

== Demographics ==
At the 2011 census, Tamaree had a population of 664.

In the 2016 census, Tamaree had a population of 880 people.

In the 2021 census, Tamaree had a population of 1,000 people.

== Education ==
There are no schools in Tamaree. The nearest government primary schools are Chatsworth State School in neighbouring Chatsworth to the west, Two Mile State School in Two Mile to the south-east, and Gympie West State School in Gympie to the south. The nearest government secondary school is James Nash State High School in Gympie to the south.
