= Wilsons Pocket =

- Suburb
- Interactive map of Wilsons Pocket
- Coordinates: 26.1247°S 152.8038°E
- Country: Australia
- State: Queensland
- LGA: Gympie Region
- Location: 20.8 km (12.9 mi) NE of Gympie; 192 km (119 mi) N of Brisbane

Government
  - State electorate: Gympie
  - Federal division: Wide Bay

Area
  - Total: 18.0 km^{2} (6.9 sq mi)

Population
  - Total: 191 (2021 census)
  - Density: 10.61/km^{2} (27.48/sq mi)
- Time zone: UTC+10:00 (AEST)
- Postcode: 4570
Suburbs around Wilsons Pocket
Goomborian	Goomborian	Goomborian
Wolvi	Wilsons Pocket	Goomborian
Wolvi	Wolvi	Wolvi

Wilsons Pocket is a rural locality in the Gympie Region, Queensland, Australia. In the 2021 census, Wilsons Pocket had a population of 191 people.

== History ==
The locality was named after Albert Henry (Shepherd) Wilson, (1845 to 1886), one of the earliest landholders in the area. Wilson was born in Shepton Mallet, Somerset, England, and he immigrated to New South Wales on the "Bolton" in 1853. He married Mary Cahill at Proston station on 8 June 1869 and they had two sons. He selected Portion 1120, Parish of Goomborian on 20 July 1878 which was granted on 1 March 1883. From 1875 to about 1882, he worked at the Golden Crown gold mine in Gympie, but may have been farming his selection on Tinana Creek at the same time. He obtained a tin miner's licence in Herberton in April 1882 and died at the Mount Wells tin mine in the Northern Territory in 1886. Following Albert Wilson's death, the title for the property on Tinana Creek was transferred to his wife, Mary Wilson on 29 April 1887.

Wilson's Pocket Provisional School opened on 24 November 1924. By 1930, it had become Wilson's Pocket State School. It closed on 24 August 1962. It was at approx 718 Wilsons Pocket Road (26.13185°S 152.80630°E).

== Demographics ==
In the 2016 census, Wilsons Pocket had a population of 197 people.

In the 2021 census, Wilsons Pocket had a population of 191 people.

== Education ==
There are no schools in Wilsons Pocket. The nearest government primary schools are Wolvi State School in neighbouring Wolvi to the south and Kia-Ora State School in Kia Ora to the north. The nearest government secondary school is Gympie State High School in Gympie to the south-west.
