= Monkland State School Residence =

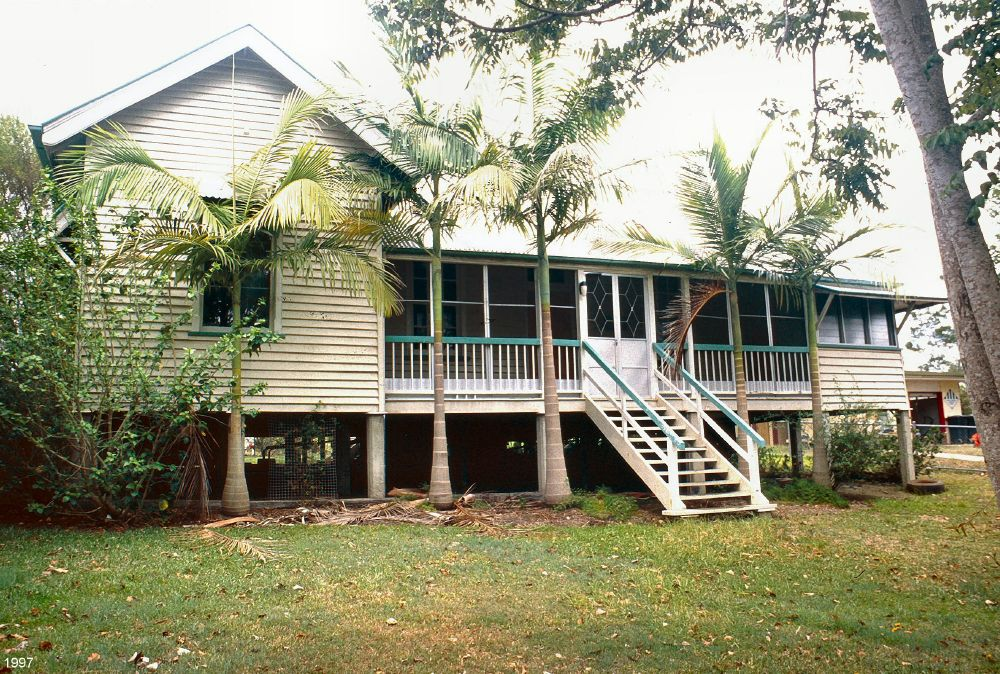
- Monkland State School Residence, 1997

- Location within Queensland Location within Australia
- 26.2129°S 152.6871°E
- Location: Brisbane Road, Monkland, Gympie Region, Queensland, Australia

History
- Design period: 1870s–1890s (late 19th century)
- Built: 1884–1890

Site notes
- Architect: Robert Ferguson

Queensland Heritage Register
- Official name: Monkland State School Residence
- Type: state heritage (built)
- Designated: 9 November 1998
- Reference no.: 602013
- Significant period: 1880s (historical); 1880s–1890s (fabric)
- Significant components: residential accommodation – headmaster's house

Monkland State School Residence is a heritage-listed house at Brisbane Road, Monkland, Gympie Region, Queensland, Australia. It was designed by architect Robert Ferguson and built from 1884 to 1890. It was added to the Queensland Heritage Register on 9 November 1998.

== History ==
The Monkland State School Residence was constructed in 1884 and is a small timber structure raised on stumps with a corrugated iron roof. It was designed when architect Robert Ferguson was employed as Superintendent of Buildings for the Department of Public Instruction of the Queensland Government.

Ferguson arrived in Queensland from Ireland in 1860 and by 1864 was employed as a temporary foreman of works for the Queensland Government. He continued to work for the Queensland Government Architect in the areas of Wide Bay and Brisbane until 1879 when he was appointed Superintendent of Buildings for the Department of Public Instruction. In this position, Ferguson developed designs for single skin timber school buildings based on the Suter style, but "avoiding the technical disadvantages of exposed studding by reverting to external sheeting".

In 1885, Ferguson resigned from the Department of Public Instruction to become a partner in his brother-in-law's firm, John Petrie and Son. He resumed employment with the Public Service as Surveyor to the Meat and Dairy Board in 1894, a position in which he remained until his death in 1906.

In 1880 a public meeting was held at Monkland to discuss the establishment of a school for the district. Following the discovery of some of the most prosperous gold mines in the Gympie region in the early 1870s, the area had rapidly expanded and by 1873, a number of shops and four hotels were trading in the main street. By the 1880s, many families were living in the area and the walk to the nearest school at One Mile was reputedly hazardous and lengthy for small children.

As a result of the public meeting, a committee was formed, and the secretary, John Clowes of One Mile Creek made a formal request to the Department of Public Instruction for the establishment of a new school, stating that the "probable number of children likely to attend is about ninety." Local subscriptions were promised and a site was proposed, although an alternative site on the corner of Brisbane and Araluen Roads was proposed in subsequent correspondence with the Department. This was probably due to a report from the head teacher of One Mile School disputing the fact that an additional school in the district was required, and that less than a mile separated the initially proposed site and the existing school.

Following a non-committal report by District Inspector John Shirley in 1881, Clowes again wrote to the Minister of Education stating that the number of likely pupils had increased and subscriptions of between £80 and £100 had been promised. The subscriptions were integral to the establishment of the school as under the Education Act of 1875, local communities were required to contribute one fifth of the cost of the construction of a new school.

Following a further inspection in the same year, after which District Inspector McGroarty advised that the proposed site was too close to the existing One Mile School to be beneficial, the committee continued their campaign. They focussed their efforts on another site, known as G F homestead no. 151, for which they paid £32/11/3 for improvements in 1881. During this time, a sub-group of the committee decided on yet another site, which was resumed and subsequently gazetted as a School Reserve.

Finally, in March 1883, McGroarty's successor, R Newcombe Ross recommended a State School be constructed on the initially purchased site and tenders were called for the construction of a school and residence. The lowest tender was received from Metcalfe and Wilson who were awarded the project, however their partnership dissolved prior to commencement of works. The next lowest tenderer, William Condon was then awarded the contract, agreeing to complete the school and residence in eight months for £895, including materials, of which approximately £180 was to be paid for by local subscriptions.

The buildings were completed in September 1884 and the first occupants of the residence were headmaster Charles Reinhold and his wife Marion. The school opened on Wednesday 24 September 1884, with 74 pupils enrolled on the first day. Numbers continued to grow and over 200 pupils were enrolled by the end of the year.

At the time of opening, the Monkland State School comprised a single room school building, and a detached residence, both of which were extended a number of times. The residence originally comprised three bedrooms, a sitting room with fireplace, a kitchen an enclosed verandah at the rear and an open verandah at the front. Constructed of timber weatherboards, it was elevated on low stumps and early plans depict the roof as shingled. At the time of its construction, it was departmental policy to provide residences for married headmasters "thereby securing a resident caretaker and cleaner for the school in the person of the headmaster's wife". The construction of residences also addressed problems associated with the lack of suitable teacher accommodation in remote areas and was used to encourage teachers to relocate to these areas.

Few additions or alterations were made to the house, apart from the construction of a fence which divided the residence from the remainder of the school grounds in 1886. In 1887, land was resumed by the Railway Department, which removed a large triangular portion from the rear of the site.

In 1890, Charles Reinhold requested that an additional two rooms be added to the western side of the residence. At this time, conditions were quite cramped with space shared by Reinhold, his wife, their four children and a servant. The additions were approved, as well as the lining of all internal walls, and the extension of the front verandah to partially wrap around the eastern side. The tender of local contractor Henry Lee for £149 was recommended and the school committee was requested to contribute £29/16/0. In 1932, a cyclonic storm severely damaged the school building, resulting in the demolition of a wing constructed in 1886, and the repair and extension of the original core. The residence remained relatively unscathed, only suffering damage to the roof over the kitchen. The new school building remained in use until a major reconstruction of the school occurred in 1958.

The Monkland State School continued to develop and expand, with a number of demountable buildings added to the site in the 1970s and 1980s. The school residence is fenced off from the main body of the site and remains largely intact.

== Description ==
The Monkland State School Residence is located within the school grounds, at the rear of the site adjacent to the railway line and is separated from the remainder of the school buildings by a tubular metal framed wire fence. Also located on the site is a small timber structure at the rear of the residence, and various plantings including a row of five palm trees immediately in front of the building.

The building is elevated on a combination of concrete and metal posts and is of timber construction with a corrugated iron roof. It comprises the original core and later additions of two rooms on the western side and an enclosed verandah on the eastern side. The core has a gable roof which intersects at right angles with a gable roof over the western addition.

A set of centrally located timber stairs provide access to the front verandah which has a balustrade with circular section balusters and is enclosed with metal framed insect screens. The front door is opposite the stairs and opens into the centrally located sitting room. It is flanked with double hung windows, the frames of which feature a chamfered detailing, and additional doors are located at right angles to the front face at either end.

The sitting room contains a rendered brick chimney breast and mantle- piece and is flanked by a similar sized dining room on the western side and two bedrooms on the eastern side. At the rear of the building is the bathroom, the kitchen, and an additional bedroom. This bedroom and the dining room open onto an enclosed verandah on the eastern side via sets of French doors. All ceilings and walls are lined with fibro-cement sheeting, apart from those on the enclosed verandahs, where ceilings are of tongue and groove boards with exposed beams and internal walls are of weatherboard.

An enclosed verandah is located at the rear of the residence, adjacent to the kitchen, from which steps lead into the rear yard. A laundry structure at ground level completes a "U" shape at the rear of the building, the centre space of which is covered by a corrugated iron roof.

== Heritage listing ==
Monkland State School Residence was listed on the Queensland Heritage Register on 9 November 1998 having satisfied the following criteria.

The place is important in demonstrating the evolution or pattern of Queensland's history.

The Monkland State School Residence was erected in 1884 as part of the newly established Monkland State School. As the only surviving building on the site from this period, the residence provides evidence of the growth of the area east of Gympie during the 1880s due to mining activity. It also provides evidence of the development of the education system throughout Queensland and is demonstrative of government policy of the period when residences were erected to overcome problems associated with the lack of appropriate accommodation for teachers in remote areas and also as encouragement for teachers to work in these areas.

The place demonstrates rare, uncommon or endangered aspects of Queensland's cultural heritage.

Although many similar residences were constructed throughout Queensland, many were replaced by new structures in the 1930s. The Monkland State School Residence is a rare surviving example of its type. It is the earliest of only four known intact examples of school residences constructed during the Ferguson period of school design.

The place is important in demonstrating the principal characteristics of a particular class of cultural places.

Although extended on a number of occasions, the Monkland State School Residence is largely intact and demonstrates the principal characteristics of a building of its type by its form and use of materials, as developed by Robert Ferguson.

The place is important because of its aesthetic significance.

Its simple form and materials contribute to the aesthetic significance of the place.

The place has a strong or special association with a particular community or cultural group for social, cultural or spiritual reasons.

The building has strong associations with past pupils, many of whom still reside in the area, and contributed to the school centenary publication printed in 1984. It also has strong associations with the present Monkland Parents and Citizens Association.

The place has a special association with the life or work of a particular person, group or organisation of importance in Queensland's history.

The Monkland State School Residence has special association with architect Robert Ferguson as a rare surviving example of his work whilst employed as Superintendent of Buildings for the Department of Public Instruction.
