= Woondum =

- Suburb
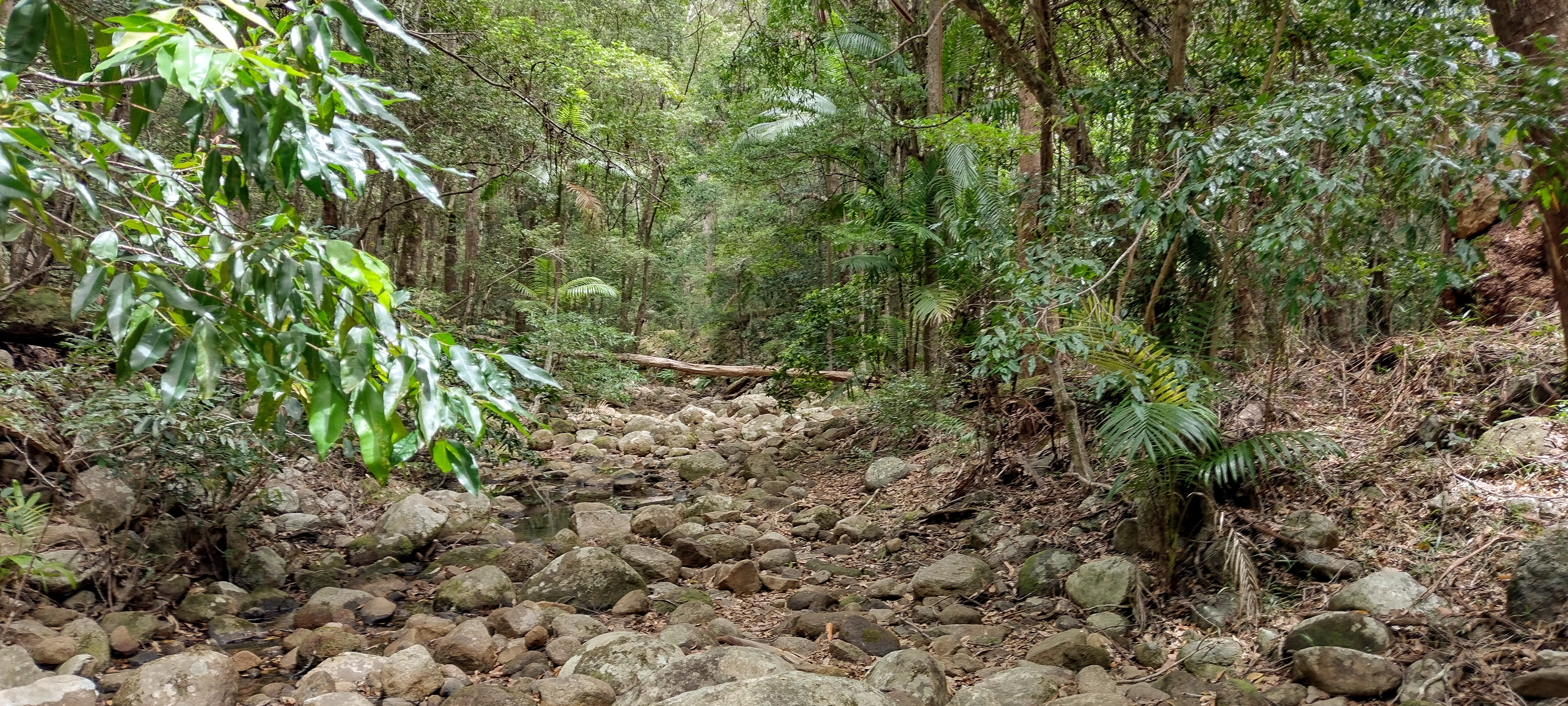
- Woondum State Forest, 2021

- Interactive map of Woondum
- Coordinates: 26.2541°S 152.7291°E
- Country: Australia
- State: Queensland
- LGA: Gympie Region
- Location: 15.5 km (9.6 mi) SE of Gympie; 79.6 km (49.5 mi) NW of Maroochydore; 162 km (101 mi) N of Brisbane

Government
  - State electorate: Gympie
  - Federal division: Wide Bay

Area
  - Total: 10.7 km^{2} (4.1 sq mi)

Population
  - Total: 66 (2021 census)
  - Density: 6.17/km^{2} (15.98/sq mi)
- Time zone: UTC+10:00 (AEST)
- Postcode: 4570
Suburbs around Woondum
Glanmire	Mothar Mountain	Mothar Mountain
Kybong	Woondum	Mothar Mountain
Kybong	Tandur	Tandur

Woondum is a rural locality in the Gympie Region, Queensland, Australia. In the 2021 census, Woondum had a population of 66 people.

== Geography ==
Woondum lies to the south-west of Gympie. The western part of locality is relatively undeveloped land and is mountainous (rising to 150 metres about sea level); most of this land is part of the Woondum State Forest. The eastern part of the locality is flatter land (approx 60–70 metres above sea level) and developed as farmland. There are a number of creeks running through the locality which is part of the Mary River drainage basin. Despite its name, the Woondum National Park is not in Woondum but is further east straddling Mothar Mountain and Kin Kin.

The North Coast railway line travels from south to north roughly separating the developed and undeveloped parts; the locality is served by the Woondum railway station (26.255278°N 152.729431°E). The Bruce Highway forms a short section of the locality's north-western boundary.

== History ==
Woondum is believed to be a Kabi language word, with wun meaning blue tongue lizard and dan meaning place.

Land in Woondum was offered for selection on 5 January 1890 and by February 1891, ten farms had been established with a further two selected. Further areas were opened by for selection over the following years. Woondum was one of 29 Village Settlements consisting of a centralised region allocated for housing surrounded by larger allotments for farming.

Woondum Provisional school opened about July 1899 and became Woondum State School on 1 January 1909. In 1913, it was renamed Ardonye State School. It closed and reopened in the early 1920s due to low students numbers, finally closing in January 1924.

A rifle club and rifle range were established in Woondum in 1912. Although rifle clubs were not part of the military, the military would often assist rifle clubs with training, supplying equipment and organising competitions, believing that it was beneficial for Australia's defence if local men become skilful at shooting.

In 1915, the Woondum railway station was upgraded to have a permanent staff of a station master and a night officer.

In 1929 it was decided to establish the Woondum State Forest rather than open up the area for banana farms. However in 1933, continued pressure resulted in some of the forest being offered up for banana farming.

== Demographics ==
In the 2016 census, Woondum had a population of 80 people.

In the 2021 census, Woondum had a population of 66 people.

== Education ==
There are no schools in Woondum. The nearest government primary school is Monkland State School in Monkland to the north-east. The nearest government secondary school is Gympie State High School in Gympie to the north-east. There are also a number of non-government schools in Gympie and its surburbs, including one in neighbouring Kybong to the south-west.
