= Tandur, Queensland =

Tandur
- Suburb
- Interactive map of Tandur
- Coordinates: 26.2777°S 152.7666°E
- Country: Australia
- State: Queensland
- LGA: Gympie Region
- Location: 17.0 km (10.6 mi) NW of Pomona; 18.5 km (11.5 mi) SE of Gympie; 27.2 km (16.9 mi) NW of Cooroy; 170 km (110 mi) N of Brisbane

Government
  - State electorate: Gympie
  - Federal division: Wide Bay

Area
  - Total: 21.3 km^{2} (8.2 sq mi)

Population
  - Total: 188 (2021 census)
  - Density: 8.83/km^{2} (22.86/sq mi)
- Time zone: UTC+10:00 (AEST)
- Postcode: 4570
Suburbs around Tandur
Woondum	Mothar Mountain	Mothar Mountain
Kybong	Tandur	Mothar Mountain
Kybong	Traveston	Traveston

Tandur is a rural locality in the Gympie Region, Queensland, Australia. In the 2021 census, Tandur had a population of 188 people.

== Geography ==
The North Coast railway line enters the locality from the south (Traveston) and exits to the north-west (Woondum). The locality was historically served by the now-abandoned:

- Meadvale railway station (26.2780°S 152.7491°E)
- Tandur railway station (26.2847°S 152.7563°E)

== History ==
Tandur Provisional School opened on 29 September 1924. On 1 May 1929, it became Tandur State School. It closed on 16 July 1967. It was on the western side of the Tandur Traveston Road (26.28630°S 152.75752°E).

In 1996, the North Coast railway line was realigned to be shorter with fewer tight curves and to improve flood mitigation. This removed the Meadvale and Tandur railway stations from the line.

== Demographics ==
In the 2016 census, Tandur had a population of 186 people.

In the 2021 census, Tandur had a population of 188 people.

== Education ==
There are no schools in Tandur. The nearest government primary schools are:

- Monkland State School in Monkland to the north-west
- Dagun State School in Dagun to the south-west
- Cooran State School in Cooran to the south-east

The nearest government secondary schools are Gympie State High School in Gympie to the north-west and Noosa District State High School which has its junior campus at Pomona to the south-east and its senior gampus at Cooroy to the south-east.
