= Ross Creek, Queensland =

Ross Creek
- Suburb
- Interactive map of Ross Creek
- Coordinates: 26.0972°S 152.7458°E
- Country: Australia
- State: Queensland
- LGA: Gympie Region
- Location: 16.0 km (9.9 mi) NE of Gympie; 187 km (116 mi) N of Brisbane

Government
  - State electorate: Gympie
  - Federal division: Wide Bay

Area
  - Total: 9.5 km^{2} (3.7 sq mi)

Population
  - Total: 63 (2021 census)
  - Density: 6.63/km^{2} (17.18/sq mi)
- Time zone: UTC+10:00 (AEST)
- Postcode: 4570
Suburbs around Ross Creek
| North Deep Creek | Downsfield | Goomboorian |
| Veteran | Ross Creek | Goomboorian |
| Veteran | Canina | Wolvi |

Ross Creek is a rural locality in the Gympie Region, Queensland, Australia. In the 2021 census, Ross Creek had a population of 63 people.

== Geography ==
The land use is predominantly grazing on native vegetation with some crop growing (mostly sugarcane) and some plantation forestry.

== Demographics ==
In the 2016 census, Ross Creek had a population of 58 people.

In the 2021 census, Ross Creek had a population of 63 people.

== Education ==
There are no schools in Ross Creek. The nearest government primary schools are Kia-Ora State School in Kia Ora to the north and Gympie East State School in Greens Creek to the south. The nearest government secondary school is Gympie State High School in Gympie to the south-east.
