= Beenaam Valley =

- Suburb
- Interactive map of Beenaam Valley
- Coordinates: 26.1902°S 152.8152°E
- Country: Australia
- State: Queensland
- LGA: Gympie Region
- Location: 19.7 km (12.2 mi) E of Gympie; 166 km (103 mi) N of Brisbane

Government
  - State electorate: Gympie
  - Federal division: Wide Bay

Area
  - Total: 7.8 km^{2} (3.0 sq mi)

Population
  - Total: 60 (2021 census)
  - Density: 7.7/km^{2} (19.9/sq mi)
- Time zone: UTC+10:00 (AEST)
- Postcode: 4570
Suburbs around Beenaam Valley
Wolvi	Wolvi	Neusa Vale
Wolvi	Beenaam Valley	Neusa Vale
Cedar Pocket	Cedar Pocket	Neusa Vale

Beenaam Valley is a rural locality in the Gympie Region, Queensland, Australia. In the 2021 census, Beenaam Valley had a population of 60 people.

== Geography ==
Beenaam Valley Road enters the locality from the south-west (Cedar Pocket) and exits to the north-east (Neusa Vale). It is the main route through the locality.

The land use is a mixture of grazing on native vegetation, crop growing, and rural residential housing.

== History ==
The locality was officially named and bounded on 1 December 2000.

== Demographics ==
In the 2016 census, Beenaam Valley had a population of 58 people.

In the 2021 census, Beenaam Valley had a population of 60 people.

== Education ==
There are no schools in Beenaam Valley. The nearest government primary school is Wolvi State School in neighbouring Wolvi to the north. The nearest government secondary school is Gympie State High School in Gympie to the west.
