= Mothar Mountain =

- Suburb
- Interactive map of Mothar Mountain
- Coordinates: 26.2333°S 152.7625°E
- Country: Australia
- State: Queensland
- LGA: Gympie Region
- Location: 14.6 km (9.1 mi) SE of Gympie; 34.6 km (21.5 mi) NW of Cooroy; 179 km (111 mi) N of Brisbane

Government
  - State electorate: Gympie
  - Federal division: Wide Bay

Area
  - Total: 57.9 km^{2} (22.4 sq mi)

Population
  - Total: 563 (2021 census)
  - Density: 9.724/km^{2} (25.18/sq mi)
- Time zone: UTC+10:00 (AEST)
- Postcode: 4570
Suburbs around Mothar Mountain
Monkland	East Deep Creek	Cedar Pocket
Glanmire; Woondum	Mothar Mountain	Kin Kin
Tandur	Traveston	Cooran

Mothar Mountain (historically also written as Mother Mountain) is a rural locality in the Gympie Region, Queensland, Australia. In the 2021 census, Mothar Mountain had a population of 563 people.

== Geography ==
The southern and eastern parts of the locality constitute the western half of Woondum National Park. The Mothar Mountain Rock Pools are in a day-use area at the entrance to the National Park.

Mothar Mountain has the following mountains:

- Mount Mothar (26.2376°S 152.8007°E) 450 metres (1,480 ft)
- Mount Boulder (26.2524°S 152.8056°E) 496 metres (1,627 ft)

== History ==
Mothar Mountain rock pools were used by for the initiation of Kabi Kabi boys.

Mothar Mountain Provisional School opened in July 1908. On 1 January 1909, it became Mothar Mountain State School. It closed on 13 July 1970. It was located on the western side of the Noosa Road north of the junction with Shadbolt Road, roughly opposite the Mothar Mountain Hall (approx 26.2437°S 152.7486°E). The school building is no longer extant.

The Mothar Mountain Hall was built in 1957.

== Demographics ==
In the 2016 census, Mothar Mountain had a population of 534 people.

In the 2021 census, Mothar Mountain had a population of 563 people.

== Heritage listings ==
Mothar Mountain Hall on Noosa Road is listed on the Gympie Local Heritage Register.

== Education ==
There are no schools in Mothar Mountain. The nearest government primary schools are:

- Monkland State School in neighbouring Monkland to the north-west
- One Mile State School in Gympie to the north-west
- Gympie East State School in Greens Creek to the north
- Cooran State School in neighbouring Cooran to the south-east

The nearest government secondary schools are Gympie State High School in Gympie to the north-west and Noosa District State High School which has its junior campus in Pomona to the south-east and its senior campus in Cooroy to the south-east.

== Amenities ==
Mothar Mountain Hall is on the northern corner of the junction of Noosa Road and Shadbolt Road (26.2454°S 152.7503°E).

== Attractions ==
The Mothar Mountain rock pools are on the southern side of Hill Road (26.2620°S 152.7966°E) within the Woondum National Park. There are day use facilities and two walking tracks through the national park.
