= Traveston =

- Town
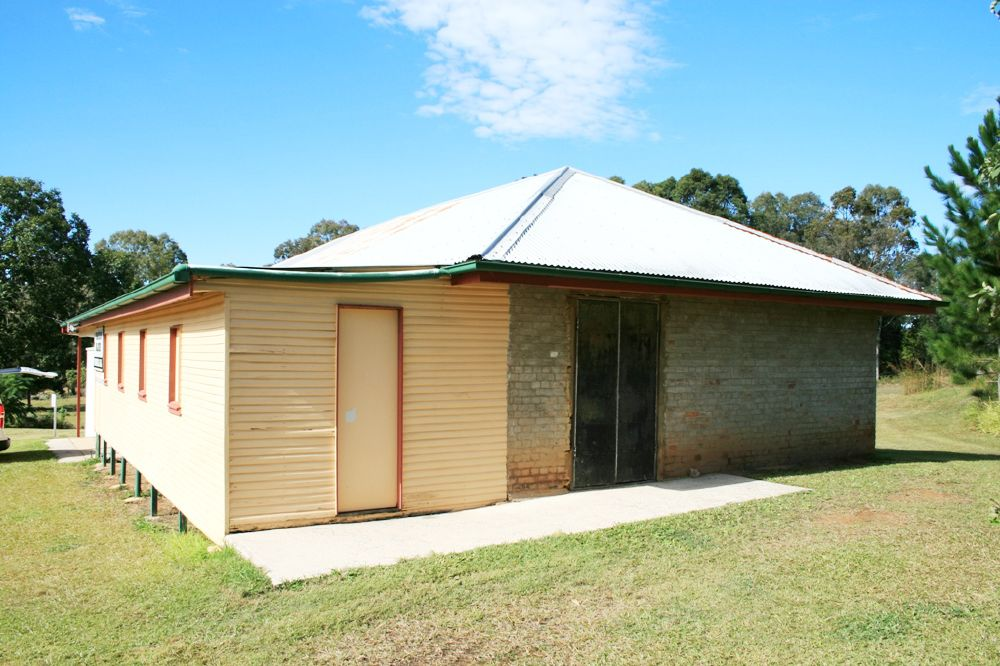
- The former Traveston Powder Magazine, now incorporated in Traveston Soldiers' Memorial Hall, 2011

- Interactive map of Traveston
- Coordinates: 26.3197°S 152.7802°E
- Country: Australia
- State: Queensland
- LGA: Gympie Region
- Location: 11.1 km (6.9 mi) NW of Pomona; 21.1 km (13.1 mi) NW of Cooroy; 25.4 km (15.8 mi) SE of Gympie; 154 km (96 mi) N of Brisbane

Government
  - State electorate: Gympie
  - Federal division: Wide Bay

Area
  - Total: 31.4 km^{2} (12.1 sq mi)

Population
  - Total: 509 (2021 census)
  - Density: 16.21/km^{2} (41.98/sq mi)
- Time zone: UTC+10:00 (AEST)
- Postcode: 4570
Localities around Traveston
Kybong	Tandur	Mothar Mountain
Kybong	Traveston	Cooran
Coles Creek	Coles Creek	Cooran

Traveston is a rural town and locality in the Gympie Region, Queensland, Australia. In the 2021 census, the locality of Traveston had a population of 509 people.

== Geography ==
Traveston is predominantly farm land with a small urban area to the west of the Traveston railway station (26.3199°S 152.7829°E) on the North Coast railway line which passes through the north-eastern part of the locality from the south-east to the north-west. The Bruce Highway passes through the south-western part of the locality travelling from the south-west to the north-west. Traveston Road connects the highway to the railway station and then follows the railway line to the south-east to neighbouring Cooran.

Green Ridge is a neighbourhood in the locality (26.3333°S 152.7333°E).

Dairying is the main industry.

== History ==
The Traveston area is part of the traditional country of the indigenous Kabi Kabi people, who have lived there for tens of thousands of years.

The town is believed to be named after an early settler/grazier called Traves or Travers who was in the area in the 1860s.

Traveston Provisional School opened on 24 August 1891. In 1907, it was renamed Skyring's Creek Provisional School. On 1 January 1909, it became Skyring's Creek State School. In 1915, it was renamed Coles Creek State School. It closed on 27 February 1961. Its location was in neighbouring Coles Creek to the south.

Traveston Siding Provisional School opened on 4 August 1896. On 1 January 1909, it became Traveston Siding State school. The school was impacted by the opening of Tandur State School, losing 20 students to the new school. In 1929, it was renamed Traveston State School. It closed on 9 June 1967. The school was on the Traveston Road immediately south of the junction with the Tandur Traveston Road (approx 26.3213°S 152.7735°E).

Green Ridge State School opened on 22 April 1912 and closed in August 1960. The school was on the south-eastern corner of the Old Bruce Highway and the Old Traveston Road (approx 26.3299°S 152.7309°E).

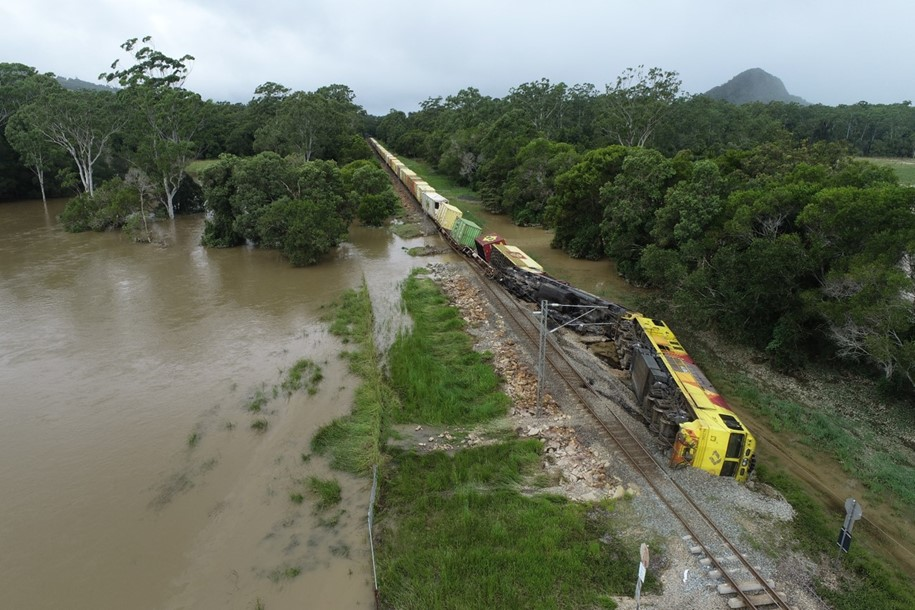
Derailed Aurizon freight train at Traveston, February 2022

On 23 February 2022, freight train Y279, operated by Aurizon, derailed at approximately 3:30am due to a track washout at the 149.020 km point, just south of Traveston, during the 2022 eastern Australia floods.

== Demographics ==
In the 2011 census, the locality of Traveston had a population of 470 people.

In the 2016 census, the locality of Traveston had a population of 480 people.

In the 2021 census, the locality of Traveston had a population of 509 people.

== Heritage listings ==
Traveston has a number of heritage-listed sites, including:

- Traveston railway station, Alford Street
- Traveston Homestead, 1813 Bruce Highway
- Traveston Powder Magazine (incorporated in Traveston Soldiers' Memorial Hall), 7 Traveston Road (26.3217°S 152.7831°E)

== Education ==
There are no schools in Traveston. The nearest government primary schools are Cooran State School in neighbouring Cooran to the east and Dagun State School in Dagun to the west. The nearest government secondary schools are Noosa District State High School (which has its junior campus in Pomona and its senior campus in Cooroy, both to the south-east) and Gympie State High School in Gympie to the north-west.

== Attractions ==
Dingo Creek Winery and Vineyard is at 265 Tandur Traveston Road. There are tours and tastings available.

== Events ==
The Dingo Creek Jazz and Blues Festival is an annual event since 2002 at the Dingo Creek Winery. It raises money for community charities as well as for Sudden infant death syndrome.
