= Neusa Vale =

- Suburb
- Interactive map of Neusa Vale
- Coordinates: 26.1986°S 152.8416°E
- Country: Australia
- State: Queensland
- LGA: Gympie Region
- Location: 23.6 km (14.7 mi) N of Pomona; 25.6 km (15.9 mi) E of Gympie; 33.8 km (21.0 mi) N of Cooroy; 159 km (99 mi) N of Brisbane

Government
  - State electorate: Gympie
  - Federal division: Wide Bay

Area
  - Total: 10.5 km^{2} (4.1 sq mi)

Population
  - Total: 54 (2021 census)
  - Density: 5.14/km^{2} (13.32/sq mi)
- Time zone: UTC+10:00 (AEST)
- Postcode: 4570
Suburbs around Neusa Vale
Beenaam Valley	Wolvi	Wolvi
Beenaam Valley	Neusa Vale	Coondoo
Cedar Pocket	Kin Kin	Kin Kin

Neusa Vale is a rural locality in the Gympie Region, Queensland, Australia. In the 2021 census, Neusa Vale had a population of 54 people.

== History ==
Neusa Vale Provisional School opened on 14 August 1899. In 1906, it was renamed Wolvi Provisional School. On 1 January 1909, it became Wolvi State School.

Neusa Vale State School (also written as Neusavale State School) opened on 18 September 1933. It was at 643 Neusavale Road (26.19444°S 152.84038°E). In 1961, the parents of Beenam Range State School, Cedar Pocket State School, Cootharaba Road State School, and Neusa Vale State School voted in favour of replacing those schools with a central school in the area. Neusa Vale State School closed on 16 March 1962. The new central Gympie East State School opened in Greens Creek on 25 January 1965.

== Demographics ==
In the 2016 census, Neusa Vale had a population of 52 people.

In the 2021 census, Neusa Vale had a population of 54 people.

== Education ==
There are no schools in Neusa Vale. The nearest government primary schools are Wolvi State School in neighbouring Wolvi to the north and Kin Kin State School in neighbouring Kin Kin to the south-east. The nearest government secondary schools are Gympie State High School in Gympie to the west and Noosa District State High School which has its junior campus (Years 7-8) in Pomona and its senior campus (Years 9-12) in Cooroy.
