= Village Settlements (Queensland) =

Village Settlements were agricultural towns established in Queensland during the 1880s as a means to attract settlers. In a bid to create a sense of community, these settlements consisted of a centralised village centre surround by 40 or 80 acre allotments. Settlers would be assigned two allotments: a lot within the village where they could establish a home, and a larger allotment for farming. The success of the scheme was largely influenced by the accessibility of the locations. The scheme was reportedly drafted by Sir Samuel Griffith.

== List of village settlements ==
Land agent district	Settlement name	Advertised farms	Settled farms in 1891
Aramae	Bimbah	59	0
Blackall	Foxhall	61	0
Bowen	Conway	51*	0
Brisbane	Ninderry	19	19
Brisbane	Connondale	28	8
Brisbane	Gneering	16	16
Bundaberg	Cordalba	28	23
Bundaberg	Bodalla	17	17
Gympie	Tuchekoi	14	14
Gympie	Brooyar	45	24
Gympie	West Teebar	18	11
Gympie	East Teebar	28	14
Gympie	Pinbarren	22	19
Gympie	Woondum**	10	2
Herberton	Eacham	28*	3
Inglewood	Koorongara	38	1
Inglewood	South Koorongara	33	12
Mackay	St Helens	38	0
Mackay	Hilsborough	24	0
Mackay	Dullawunna	11	4
Mackay	Murrinda	27	0
Nanango	Taalinga	28	22
Port Douglas	Euluma	28	0
Port Douglas	Murrin Murrin	24	0
Roma	Cogurra	60	9
Roma	North Hodgson	36	11
Roma	Yingerbay	60	0
Roma	Wallumbilla	78	21
Toowoomba	Ravensbourne	80	80

Notes: *The number of properties advertised and made available differed **This place was not listed in the government advertisement.
