= Coondoo =

- Suburb
- Interactive map of Coondoo
- Coordinates: 26.1916°S 152.9111°E
- Country: Australia
- State: Queensland
- LGA: Gympie Region
- Location: 32.9 km (20.4 mi) E of Gympie; 43.4 km (27.0 mi) N of Cooroy; 177 km (110 mi) N of Brisbane

Government
  - State electorate: Gympie
  - Federal division: Wide Bay

Area
  - Total: 24.2 km^{2} (9.3 sq mi)

Population
  - Total: 43 (2021 census)
  - Density: 1.777/km^{2} (4.60/sq mi)
- Time zone: UTC+10:00 (AEST)
- Postcode: 4570
Suburbs around Coondoo
Wolvi	Toolara Forest	Toolara Forest
Neusa Vale	Coondoo	Toolara Forest
Kin Kin	Kin Kin	Como

Coondoo is a rural locality in the Gympie Region, Queensland, Australia. In the 2021 census, Coondoo had a population of 43 people.

== Geography ==
The Wolvi Range roughly forms the south-western boundary of the locality. Mount Coondoo is in the north-east of the locality (26.1824°S 152.9207°E) rising to 288 metres (945 ft) above sea level.

The south of the locality is within the Toolara State Forest which extends into the neighbouring localites of Kin Kin, Como, and Toolara Forest. Apart from these protected areas, the land use is predominantly grazing on native vegetation with some rural residential housing.

== History ==
Wolvi East Provisional School opened on 27 August 1912 as a half-time school in conjunction with Beenam Range Provisional School (meaning that a single teacher was shared between the two schools). About 1915 or 1916, it became a full-time provisional school. In 1917, it was renamed Coondoo Provisional School. In 1933, it became Coondoo State School. It closed about December 1968. It was located on the corner of Kin Kin Road and Stewart Road (26.1737°S 152.8900°E).

== Demographics ==
In the 2016 census, Coondoo had a population of 66 people.

In the 2021 census, Coondoo had a population of 43 people.

== Education ==
There are no schools in Coondoo. The nearest government primary schools are Wolvi State School in neighbouring Wolvi to the north-west and Kin Kin State School in neighbouring Kin Kin to the south. The nearest government secondary schools are Gympie State High School in Gympie to the west and Noosa District State High School which has its junior campus in Pomona and its senior campus in Cooroy, both to the south.

There are also non-government schools in Gympie and its suburbs and in Cooroy.
