= Goomboorian =

- Suburb
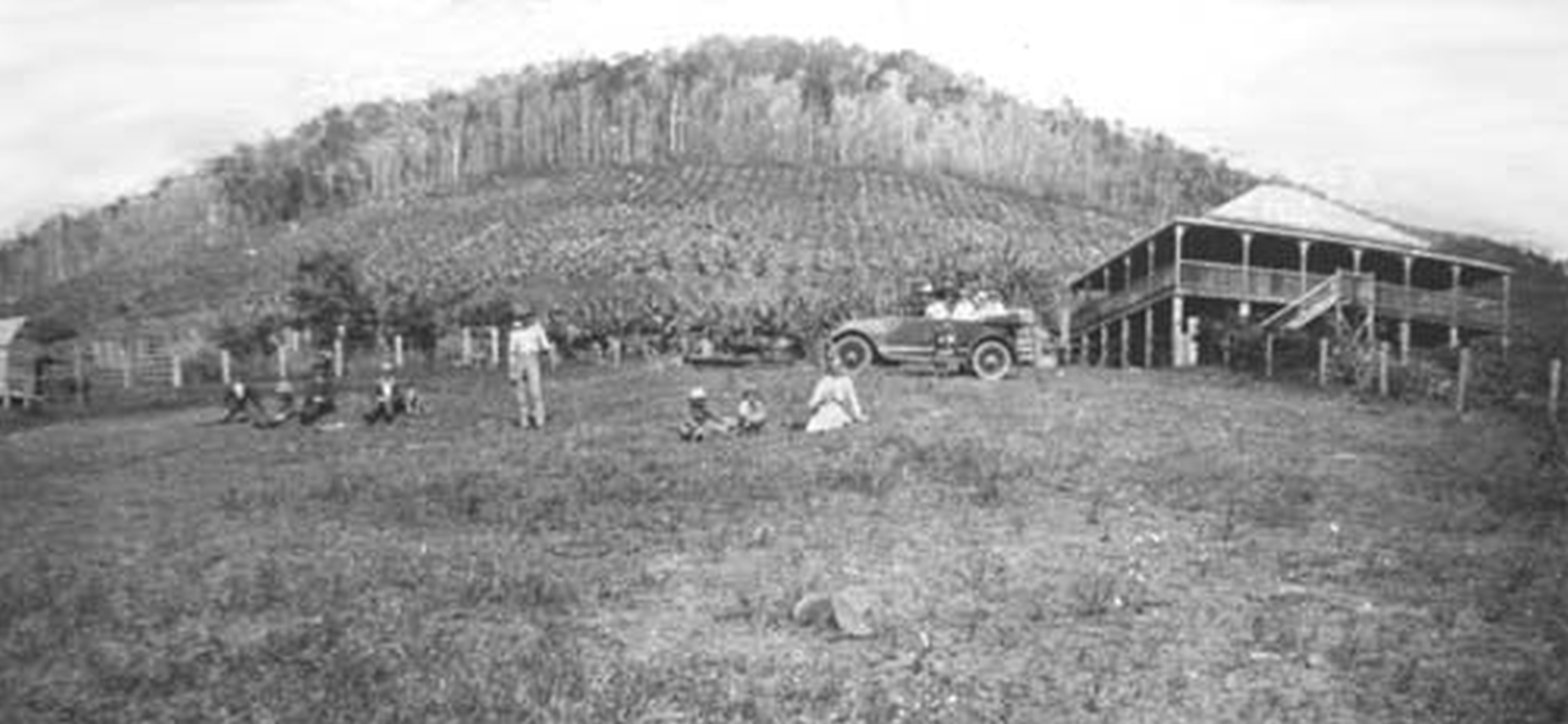
- Damm's banana farm in Webster Road, circa 1920.jpg

- Interactive map of Goomboorian
- Coordinates: 26.0750°S 152.7833°E
- Country: Australia
- State: Queensland
- LGA: Gympie Region
- Location: 22.6 km (14.0 mi) NW of Gympie; 195 km (121 mi) N of Brisbane

Government
  - State electorate: Gympie
  - Federal division: Wide Bay

Area
  - Total: 47.3 km^{2} (18.3 sq mi)

Population
  - Total: 566 (2021 census)
  - Density: 11.966/km^{2} (30.99/sq mi)
- Time zone: UTC+10:00 (AEST)
- Postcode: 4570
Suburbs around Goomboorian
Downsfield	Kia Ora	Toolara Forest
Ross Creek	Goomboorian	Toolara Forest
Wolvi	Wilsons Pocket	Wolvi

Goomboorian is a rural locality in the Gympie Region, Queensland, Australia. In the 2021 census, Goomboorian had a population of 566 people.

== Geography ==
The locality is bounded to the south-west by the Tagigan Range, separating it from Wilsons Pocket. Tinana Creek enters the locality from Wilsons Pocket just north of the Tagigan Range and exits to the north (Kia Ora); it is a tributary of the Mary River.

Goomboorian has the following mountains:

- Mount South Goomboorian in the north-west of the locality (26.0685°S 152.7589°E) 383 metres (1,257 ft)
- Mount Tagigan on the south-western boundary with Wilsons Pocket (26.1057°S 152.7956°E) 279 metres (915 ft)

Despite the name, Mount South Goomboorian is in neighbouring Kia Ora to the north.

Tin Can Bay Road enters the locality from the west (Ross Creek) and exits to the north-west (Kia Ora / Toolara Forest).

The land use is a mixture of grazing on native vegetation, crop growing, and rural residential housing.

== History ==
Tenders were called to build Goomboorian Provisional School in February 1901. The school opened on 3 February 1902. On 1 January 1909, it became Goomboorian State School. It closed in 1967. It was at approx 8–10 Tagigan Road (26.07739°S 152.78139°E) extending south to Tinana Creek.

The Goomboorian School of Arts opened in August 1915. In March 1918, an Honour Board was installed to recognise those who had served in World War I.

The Goomboorian Memorial Hall was originally built in 1917. It was extended in 1922 and dedicated to those who had died in World War I.

== Demographics ==
In the 2016 census, Goomboorian had a population of 499 people.

In the 2021 census, Goomboorian had a population of 566 people.

== Education ==
There are no schools in Goomboorian. The nearest government primary schools are Kia-Ora State School in neighbouring Kia Ora to the north and Wolvi State School in neighbouring Wolvi to the south-east. The nearest government secondary school is Gympie State High School in Gympie to the south-west.

== Amenities ==
The Goomboorian Memorial Hall is at 5 Ross Road (26.07697°S 152.77937°E).

== Events ==
A market is held on the morning of every 2nd Saturday of the month at the Goomboorian Memorial Hall.
