= Canina, Queensland =

Canina
- Suburb
- Interactive map of Canina
- Coordinates: 26.1430°S 152.7444°E
- Country: Australia
- State: Queensland
- LGA: Gympie Region
- Location: 11.5 km (7.1 mi) NE of Gympie; 184 km (114 mi) N of Brisbane

Government
  - State electorate: Gympie
  - Federal division: Wide Bay

Area
  - Total: 16.1 km^{2} (6.2 sq mi)

Population
  - Total: 367 (2021 census)
  - Density: 22.80/km^{2} (59.04/sq mi)
- Time zone: UTC+10:00 (AEST)
- Postcode: 4570
Suburbs around Canina
Veteran	Ross Creek	Wolvi
Veteran	Canina	Wolvi
Greens Creek	Greens Creek	Greens Creek

Canina is a rural locality in the Gympie Region, Queensland, Australia. In the 2021 census, Canina had a population of 367 people.

== Geography ==
Tin Can Bay Road (State Route 15) enters the locality from the south-west. Kin Kin Road splits from Tin Can Bay Road at Canina and proceeds east ultimately to Kin Kin, while Tin Can Bay Road continues, without a route number, to the north ultimately to Tin Can Bay.

== Demographics ==
In the 2016 census Canina had a population of 366 people.

In the 2021 census, Canina had a population of 367 people.

== Education ==
There are no schools in Canina. The nearest government primary schools are Gympie East State School in neighbouring Greens Creek to the south and Wolvi State School in neighbouring Wolvi. The nearest government secondary school is Gympie State High School in Gympie to the south-west.
