= Traveston railway station =

Railway station in Queensland, Australia

Traveston
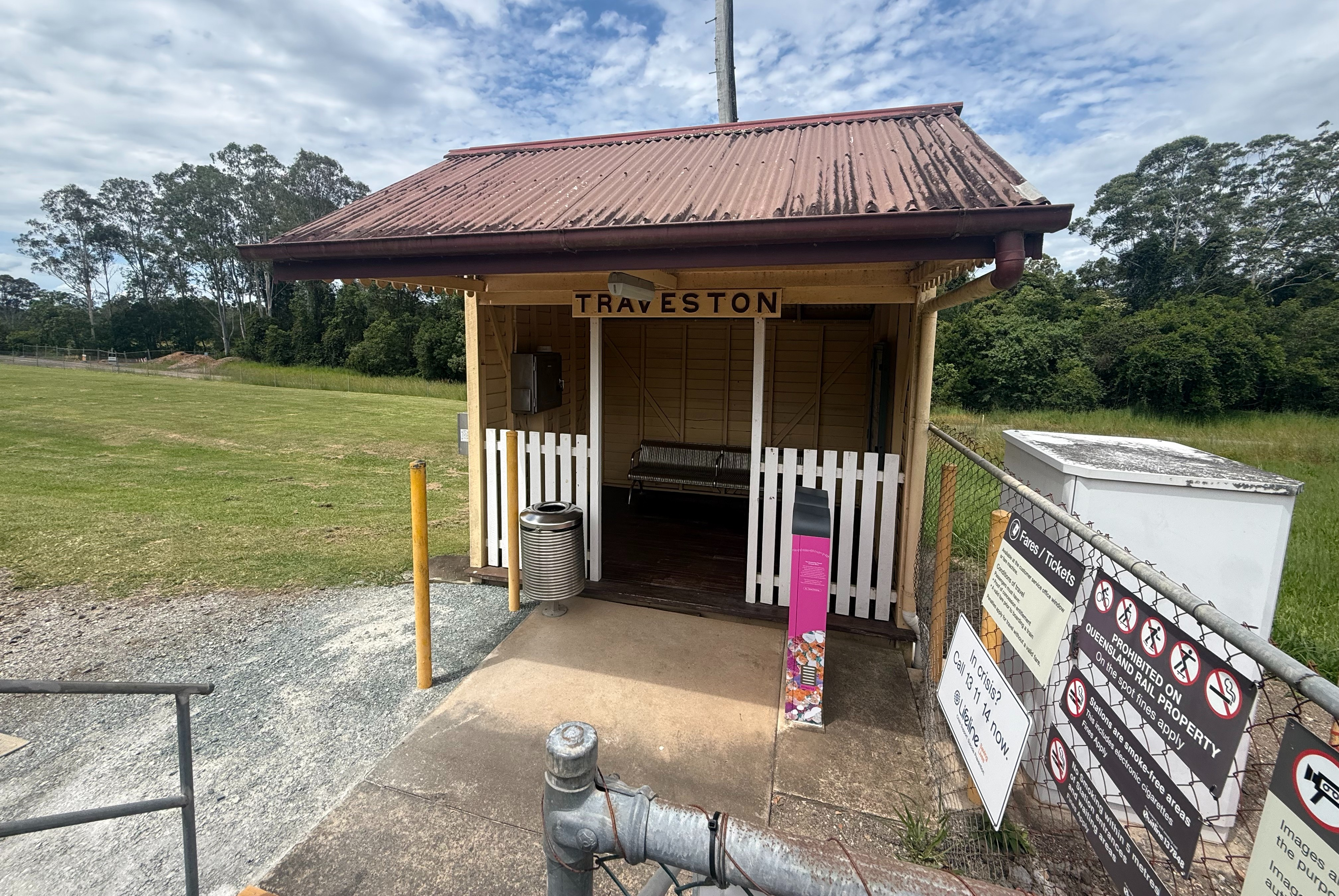
- Station building in January 2026

General information
- Location: Howe Road, Traveston
- Coordinates: 26°19′11″S 152°46′59″E
- Owner: Queensland Rail
- Operator: Queensland Rail
- Line: T1 Nambour/Gympie North
- Distance: 150.34 kilometres from Central
- Platforms: 1
- Tracks: 2

Construction
- Structure type: Ground

Other information
- Status: Unstaffed
- Station code: 600499
- Fare zone: Zone 8
- Website: Queensland Rail

History
- Opened: 1889; 137 years ago
- Rebuilt: 2011; 15 years ago

Services
Preceding station	Queensland Rail	Following station
Cooran towards Roma Street	Gympie North service	Gympie North Terminus
Location

Traveston is a railway station operated by Queensland Rail on the Nambour/Gympie North line. It opened in 1889 and serves the Gympie town of Traveston. It is a ground level station, featuring one side platform, and is the shortest railway station in Queensland.

== History ==
Traveston station consists of one short platform that can only accommodate one carriage, requiring passengers to alight via the front door of services. A timber waiting room shelter is located behind the platform at ground level. Opposite the platform lies a crossing loop.

In 2010, the station was threatened with closure after the waiting room was deemed unsafe. However, in 2011 it was decided to restore the shelter, despite it being the least used station in on the Queensland Rail Citytrain network with an average of four passengers per week.

== Services ==
Traveston is serviced by two daily Citytrain network services in each direction.

== 1925 derailment disaster ==
On 9 June 1925, the Rockhampton Mail derailed near Traveston on a high timber trestle bridge. Ten people were killed and 48 injured when a passenger car and the luggage van plunged off the bridge, and another passenger car was pulled on its side. It resulted in baggage cars being specially built for passenger trains and ended the use of certain types of goods vehicles on passenger trains.

== Services by platform ==
Traveston platform arrangement
Platform	Line	Destinations	Notes
1	T1 Nambour/Gympie North	Gympie North	
1	T1 Nambour/Gympie North	Roma Street (to Ipswich/Rosewood line)	
