= Dingo Creek Jazz and Blues Festival =

Music festival in Australia

- Genre: Australian jazz, blues, roots, soul, R&B, swing, Alternative
- Locations: Traveston, Queensland, Australia
- Years active: 2002–present

The Dingo Creek Wine, Jazz & Blues Festival is a music festival in Australia at the Dingo Creek Vineyard at Traveston, Queensland, south of Gympie.

== History and charity ==
David and Marg Gillespie began this festival in 2002 to commemorate what would have been their daughter, Rachel's 21st birthday, who they lost to Sudden Infant Death Syndrome (SIDS). Since then they have raised more than $70,000 for SIDS and Kids Qld as well as promote the service free of charge to all Queensland families.

With David and Marg's retirement from the Dingo Creek Jazz & Blues Festival, Gympie Rotary Club has agreed to take on the management of this event with all proceeds going to community charities and keeping with festival tradition, SIDS will be the major benefactor.

== 2012 performers ==
- Backsliders
- Band of Blue
- BSB Swing!
- Liam Burrows
- Barry Charles
- Daniel Champagne
- Cousin Alice
- Pete Cullen
- Mark Easton
- Haight Ashbury Song Show
- Lil Fi
- Wendy Matthews
- James Morrison
- John Morrison
- Navy Band
- Gregory Page
- Sassy Jazz
- The Wizard and Oz
- Zephyr Project

== See also ==
- List of blues festivals
- List of festivals in Australia
