= Banks Pocket, Queensland =

Banks Pocket
- Suburb
- Interactive map of Banks Pocket
- Coordinates: 26.1513°S 152.6708°E
- Country: Australia
- State: Queensland
- LGA: Gympie Region
- Location: 3.9 km (2.4 mi) N of Gympie; 180 km (110 mi) N of Brisbane

Government
  - State electorate: Gympie
  - Federal division: Wide Bay

Area
  - Total: 0.9 km^{2} (0.35 sq mi)

Population
  - Total: 187 (2021 census)
  - Density: 208/km^{2} (538/sq mi)
- Time zone: UTC+10:00 (AEST)
- Postcode: 4570
Suburbs around Banks Pocket
Tamaree	Tamaree	North Deep Creek
Araluen	Banks Pocket	Veteran
Araluen	Araluen	Araluen

Banks Pocket is a rural locality in the Gympie Region, Queensland, Australia. In the 2021 census, Banks Pocket had a population of 187 people.

== Geography ==
The land use is rural residential housing.

== History ==
Bank's Pocket Provisional School opened on 3 June 1904. It became Bank's Pocket State School on 1 January 1909. It closed in 1959. The school was on a 5-acre (2.0 ha) site on Bank's Pocket Road (26.1538°S 152.6732°E). The North Coast railway line passed immediately west of the school during its operational period, but the line was realigned further east in the 1980s to facilitate electrification, terminating Bank's Pocket Road before reaching the school site.

The locality was officially named and bounded on 1 December 2000.

== Demographics ==
In the 2016 census, Banks Pocket had a population of 156 people.

In the 2021 census, Banks Pocket had a population of 187 people.

== Education ==
There are no schools in Banks Pocket. The nearest government primary school is Gympie West State School in Gympie to the south. The nearest government secondary schools are James Nash State High School and Gympie State High School, both in Gympie.
