= Neerdie, Queensland =

Neerdie
- Suburb
- Interactive map of Neerdie
- Coordinates: 25.95023°S 152.7282°E
- Country: Australia
- State: Queensland
- LGAs: Gympie Region; Fraser Coast Region
- Location: 30.0 km (18.6 mi) NNE of Gympie; 75.9 km (47.2 mi) S of Maryborough; 112 km (70 mi) S of Hervey Bay; 207 km (129 mi) N of Brisbane

Government
  - State electorates: Gympie; Maryborough
  - Federal division: Wide Bay

Area
  - Total: 110.5 km^{2} (42.7 sq mi)

Population
  - Total: 111 (2021 census)
  - Density: 1.005/km^{2} (2.602/sq mi)
- Time zone: UTC+10:00 (AEST)
- Postcode: 4570
Suburbs around Neerdie
Bauple Forest	TuanForest	Toolara Forest
Glenwood; Gunalda	Neerdie	Toolara Forest
Anderleigh	Downsfield	Kia Ora

Neerdie is a rural locality split between the Gympie Region and the Fraser Coast Region, both in Queensland, Australia. In the 2021 census, Neerdie had a population of 111 people.

== Geography ==
Most of the locality is within the Neerdie State Forest except for some land parcels in the south-east of the locality, where the land use is a mixture of rural residential housing and grazing on native vegetation.

== History ==
Originally Neerdie was within the Shire of Tiaro and then later within the Shire of Cooloola. In the local government amalgamations of 2008, Neerdie became split between Gympie Region and Fraser Coast Region.

== Demographics ==
In the 2016 census, Neerdie had a population of 109 people.

In the 2021 census, Neerdie had a population of 111 people.

== Education ==
There are no schools in Neerdie. The nearest government primary school is Kia-Ora State School in neighbouring Kia Ora to the south-east. The nearest government secondary school is Gympie State High School in Gympie to the south-west.
