= No. 1 Scottish Gympie Mine and Battery =

Historic mine in Queensland, Australia

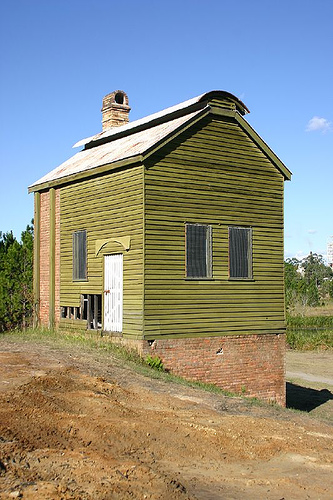
- Retort house, where gold and mercury were separated, 2006

- Location within Queensland Location within Australia
- 26.2156°S 152.689°E
- Location: Old Brisbane Road, Monkland, Gympie Region, Queensland, Australia

History
- Design period: 1870s–1890s (late 19th century)
- Built: c. 1889–c. 1923

Queensland Heritage Register
- Official name: No. 1 Scottish Gympie Mine and Battery
- Type: state heritage (archaeological, built)
- Designated: 21 October 1992
- Reference no.: 600536
- Significant period: 1889–1923 (fabric); 1867–1923 (historical)
- Significant components: slab/s – concrete, machinery/plant/equipment – mining/mineral processing, tank – water, assay office, shaft, battery/crusher/stamper/jaw breaker

No. 1 Scottish Gympie Mine and Battery is a heritage-listed mine at Old Brisbane Road, Monkland, Gympie Region, Queensland, Australia. It was built from c. 1889 to c. 1923. It was added to the Queensland Heritage Register on 21 October 1992.

== History ==
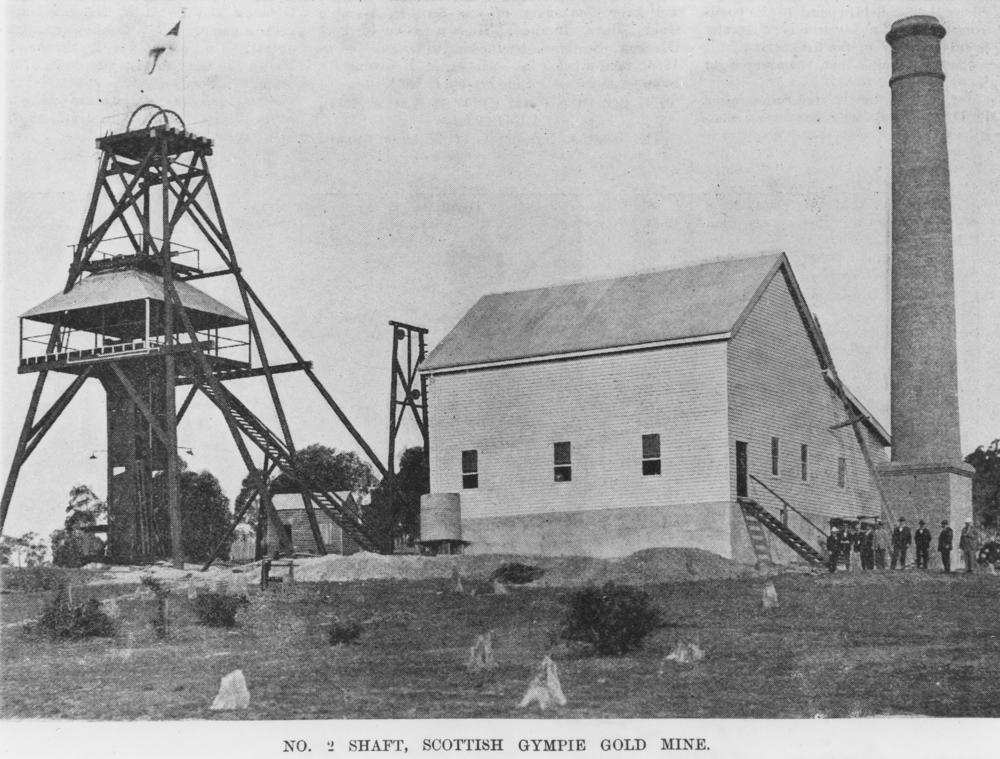
Scottish Gympie Gold Mine, No. 2 shaft, 1900

The lease occupied by the site was taken up in 1889 as the "No.1 Eastern" mine, forfeited and taken up as the No.3 Great Eastern mine in 1891, but went into liquidation soon thereafter. Gympie Goldmines (Eastern Monkland) Company was formed, and was sold to Scottish investors in 1895, becoming the Scottish Gympie Gold Mines Limited with its head office in Glasgow.

By the following year the shaft was down 1,433 feet (437 m), the deepest on the field. At this time companies started considering cyaniding their tailings dumps and the company increased the number of stampers in its battery by 50 in 1898. In 1904 the battery was reported to have 125 head of stamps and 394 men employed, and to be raising 7,000 long tons (7,100 t) of ore for crushing each year, with an estimated ore reserve for another ten years.

The company closed the mine in 1923 and in the following year a syndicate of 19 men was formed to purchase the lease over the shaft and winding gear, and mining recommenced intermittently. However the lease was relinquished in 1924 and an auction sale of machinery held. In 1927 W. Runge and O. Alexander took over the mine and battery site and established a cyaniding plant. The leases were held by the Runge family until taken over by the Gympie City Council.

The mine was the most productive in the Gympie goldfield producing 608,279 ounces (17,244,400 g) of gold from 1,589,162 long tons (1,614,663 t) of ore between 1867 and 1923.

== Description ==
The place consists of:

- The standing assay office which has been conserved
- Concrete foundations of the compressor room, engine room and secondary crushing equipment
- A 4-head prospecting stamp battery
- Engine foundations
- Battery foundations
- Very large in-ground water tank
- Capped shaft, headframe foundations and foundations of the winding house.

== Heritage listing ==
No. 1 Scottish Gympie Mine and Battery was listed on the Queensland Heritage Register on 21 October 1992 having satisfied the following criteria.

The place is important in demonstrating the evolution or pattern of Queensland's history.

The No.1 Scottish Gympie mine and battery is significant in the evolution and pattern of Queensland history because it was the most successful mine in the Gympie Goldfield, which had a major impact on Queensland's development and was a major example of the impact of overseas investment on the development of the State.

The place demonstrates rare, uncommon or endangered aspects of Queensland's cultural heritage.

The place is a rare aspect of Queensland's cultural heritage and contains the only readable evidence of historical mining activity in Gympie.

The place has potential to yield information that will contribute to an understanding of Queensland's history.

The place demonstrates, through surviving foundations and the intact assay office, the characteristics of a large-scale gold mining works and as such has the potential to provide information to increase our understanding of battery technology and management.

The place is important in demonstrating the principal characteristics of a particular class of cultural places.

Significant as the most intact surviving example of mining remains in the Gympie field and probably the largest gold battery remains in Southeast Queensland.
