= Wolvi, Queensland =

Wolvi
- Suburb
- Interactive map of Wolvi
- Coordinates: 26.1583°S 152.8347°E
- Country: Australia
- State: Queensland
- LGA: Gympie Region
- Location: 23.7 km (14.7 mi) ENE of Gympie; 190 km (120 mi) N of Brisbane

Government
  - State electorate: Gympie
  - Federal division: Wide Bay

Area
  - Total: 71.4 km^{2} (27.6 sq mi)

Population
  - Total: 521 (2021 census)
  - Density: 7.297/km^{2} (18.899/sq mi)
- Time zone: UTC+10:00 (AEST)
- Postcode: 4570
Suburbs around Wolvi
Ross Creek	Wilsons Pocket; Goomboorian	Toolara Forest
Canina; Greens Creek	Wolvi	Toolara Forest
Cedar Pocket	Beenaam Valley; Neusa Vale	Coondoo

Wolvi is a rural locality in the Gympie Region, Queensland, Australia. In the 2021 census, Wolvi had a population of 521 people.

== Geography ==
Mount Wolvi is in the south-east of the locality (26.1761°S 152.8691°E), rising to 375 metres (1,230 ft) above sea level.

Kin Kin Road enters the locality from the west (Greens Creek) and exits the locality to the south-east (Coondoo).

== History ==
The locality name Wolvi is derived from the Aboriginal word (Kabi language, Dulingbara dialect), wolvai or wollai, meaning a young kangaroo almost weaned.

In 1887, 8,360 acres (3,380 ha) of land were resumed from the Tagigan pastoral run. The land was offered for selection for the establishment of small farms on 17 April 1887.

Neusa Vale Provisional School opened on 14 August 1899. In 1906, it was renamed Wolvi Provisional School. On 1 January 1909, it became Wolvi State School. The school's 2024 Annual Report showed enrolments of 25 students in 2022, 27 in 2023, and 28 in 2024.

St George's Anglican Church was dedicated on 28 April 1912. It was located just to the west of the Wolvi State School. Circa 1957 the building was sold for removal.

Wolvi East Provisional School opened on 27 August 1912 as a half-time school in conjunction with Beenam Range Provisional School (meaning that a single teacher was shared between the two schools). About 1915 or 1916 it became a full-time provisional school. In 1917, it was renamed Coondoo Provisional School. In 1933, it became Coondoo State School. It closed in 1968. It was located on the corner of Kin Kin Road and Stewart Road (26.1737°S 152.8900°E).

The Wolvi General Store opened just west of the school around 1994, but closed in June 2016.

== Demographics ==
In the 2016 census, Wolvi had a population of 467 people.

In the 2021 census, Wolvi had a population of 521 people.

== Heritage listings ==
Wolvi has the following heritage listings:

- Wolvi Hall, Kin Kin Road
- Wolvi State School, 936 Kin Kin Road
- Wolvi Sawmill, 888 Kin Kin Road

== Education ==
Wolvi State School is a government primary (Prep-6) school for boys and girls at 936 Kin Kin Road (26.1492°S 152.8176°E). In 2017, the school had an enrolment of 23 students with 2 teachers and 7 non-teaching staff (3 full-time equivalent).

There are no secondary schools in Wolvi. The nearest government secondary school is Gympie State High School in Gympie to the west. There are also a number of non-government schools in Gympie and its suburbs.
