= Araluen, Queensland =

Araluen Gympie, Queensland
- Coordinates: 26.1569°S 152.6555°E
- Population: 649 (2021 census)
  - Density: 111.9/km^{2} (289.8/sq mi)
- Postcode(s): 4570
- Area: 5.8 km^{2} (2.2 sq mi)
- Time zone: AEST (UTC+10:00)
- Location: 4.4 km (3 mi) N of Gympie CBD; 185 km (115 mi) N of Brisbane
- LGA(s): Gympie Region
- State electorate(s): Gympie
- Federal division(s): Wide Bay
Suburbs around Araluen:
Chatsworth	Tamaree	Banks Pocket
Chatsworth	Araluen	Veteran
Two Mile	Gympie CBD	Victory Heights

Araluen is a residential locality in Gympie in the Gympie Region, Queensland, Australia. In the 2021 census, Araluen had a population of 649 people.

== Geography ==
Araluen is 4 kilometres (2 mi) north of Gympie's central business district.

The Bruce Highway forms part of the western boundary of the suburb. The North Coast railway line enters the suburb from the south (Gympie) and exits to the north-east (Banks Pocket / Veteran). This section of the railway line was bypassed in 1989 by a new 8-kilometre (5.0 mi) alignment that was built as part of the electrification of the North Coast line, which now carries most rail traffic. However, the bypassed section is still in use for local purposes and the Mary Valley Rattler heritage railway.

The land use is residential with the exception of the Gympie Regional Council Saleyards in Saleyard Road in the south-east of the locality (26.1634°S 152.6748°E). It is served by the Banks Pocket railway siding (26.1644°S 152.6763°E) on the bypassed section of the North Coast line.

== History ==
Gympie Christian Academy opened in 1980 on the site of the former Gympie cattle yards. Initially, there were two teachers, two teacher aides, and 36 students with one classroom also being used as a church. In 1999, the school was renamed Victory College. The equestrian centre was built in 2015 with the roof added over the arena in 2018.

== Demographics ==
At the 2006 census, Araluen had a population of 520 people.

In the 2016 census, Araluen had a population of 614 people.

In the 2021 census, Araluen had a population of 649 people.

== Economy ==
Gympie Regional Council Saleyards conducts sales every fortnight with 60,000 cattle passing through the sale years each year.

== Education ==
Victory College is a private primary and secondary (K-12) school at 173 Old Maryborough Road (26.1625°S 152.6626°E). It is operated by the Victory Church (formerly the Gympie Christian Outreach Centre), which is affiliated with the International Network of Churches. It has an equestrian centre and a full-sized undercover arena (the only one at a school in Queensland). In 2018, the school had an enrolment of 582 students with 44 teachers (43 full-time equivalent) and 40 non-teaching staff (34 full-time equivalent). In 2021, the school had an enrolment of 752 students with 57 teachers (54 full-time equivalent) and 58 non-teaching staff (47.2 full-time equivalent).

The nearest government primary schools are Two Mile State School in neighbouring Two Mile to the south-west and Gympie West State School in neighbouring Gympie CBD to the south. The nearest government secondary schools are James Nash State High School and Gympie State High School, both in Gympie CBD.

== Amenities ==
The Apolostic Church of Queensland is at 432 Old Maryborough Road (northern corner with Atlkinsons Road, 26.1518°S 152.6491°E).
