= Glanmire, Queensland =

Glanmire
- Suburb
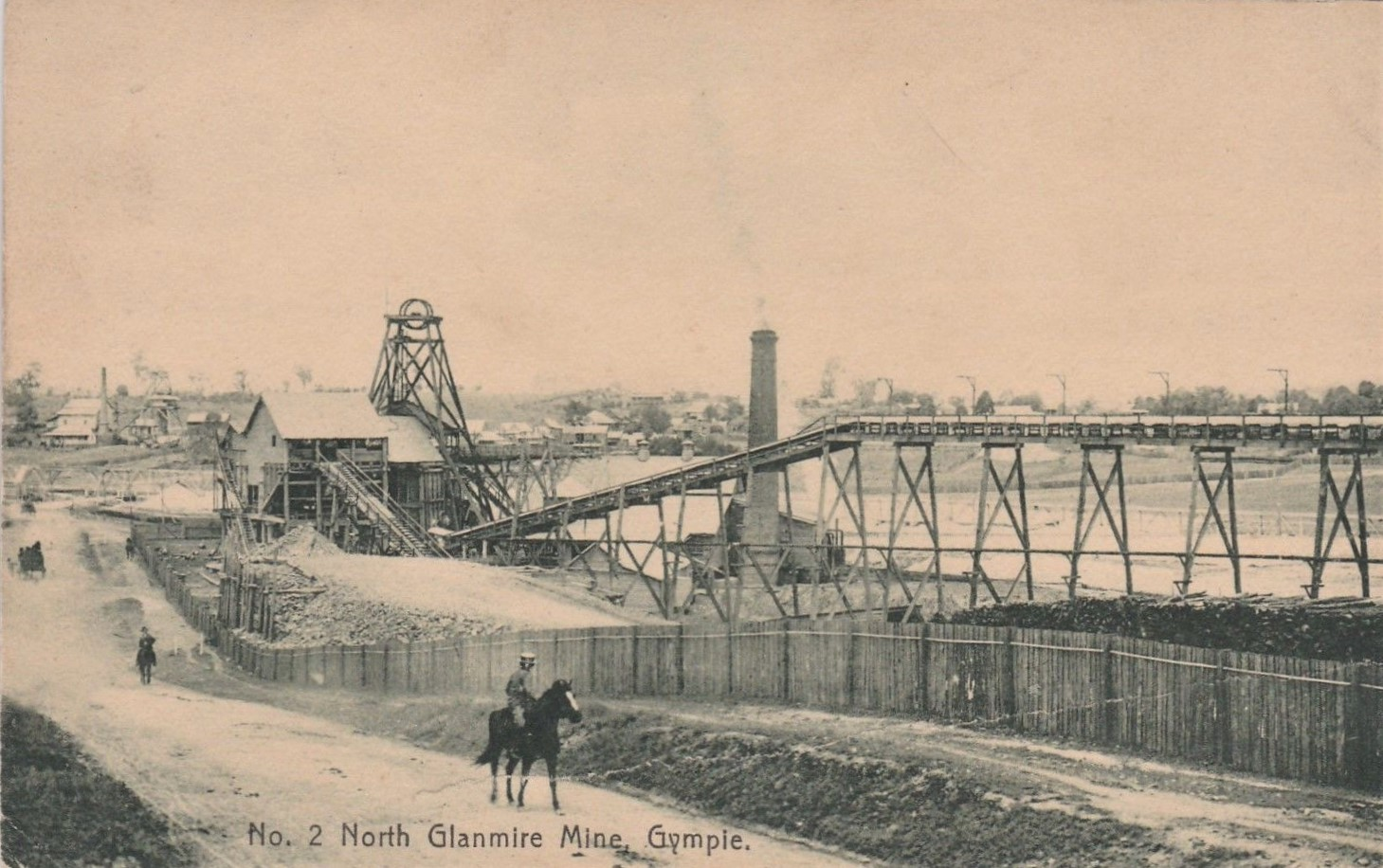
- No. 2 North Glanmire MIne, very early 1900s

- Interactive map of Glanmire
- Coordinates: 26.2263°S 152.6958°E
- Country: Australia
- State: Queensland
- City: Gympie
- LGA: Gympie Region
- Location: 6.5 km (4.0 mi) SSE of Gympie CBD; 165 km (103 mi) N of Brisbane

Government
  - State electorate: Gympie
  - Federal division: Wide Bay

Area
  - Total: 2.2 km^{2} (0.85 sq mi)

Population
  - Total: 28 (2021 census)
  - Density: 12.7/km^{2} (33.0/sq mi)
- Time zone: UTC+10:00 (AEST)
- Postcode: 4570
Suburbs around Glanmire
Monkland	Monkland	Mothar Mountain
Monkland	Glanmire	Woondum
The Dawn	Kybong	Woondum

Glanmire is an urban industrial locality in Gympie in the Gympie Region, Queensland, Australia. In the 2021 census, Glanmire had a population of 28 people.

== Geography ==
Glanmire is 6 kilometres (4 mi) south-east of Gympie's central business district via Bruce Highway. It is bounded by the North Coast railway line to the northeast, Six Mile Creek to the east and southeast, Mary River to the south-west and Hall Road to the north-west. It contains the Gympie Industrial Estate.

The Bruce Highway enters the locality from the south (Kybong) and exits to the north (Monkland).

== History ==
The locality was named after the town of Glanmire, County Cork, Ireland.

In 2018, Six Mile Oval was renamed Ray Warren Oval in recognition of Ray Warren who had been involved with the local Aussie Rules team, the Gympie Cats, for 37 years.

== Demographics ==
In the 2006 census, Glanmire had a population of 160 people.

In the 2016 census, Glanmire had a population of 20 people.

In the 2021 census, Glanmire had a population of 28 people.

== Education ==
There are no schools in Glanmire. The nearest government primary school is Monkland State School in neighbouring Monkland to the north. The nearest government secondary school is Gympie State High School in Gympie to the north.

== Amenities ==
Ray Warren Oval (formerly Six Mile Oval) is host to the Gympie Cats, who play in the AFL Bundaberg-Wide Bay league. It is at 610 Bruce Highway (26.2299°S 152.6957°E).

== Attractions ==
The Six Mile Creek Rest Area is a grassed riverside reserve at 612 Bruce Highway in the south of the locality (26.2319°S 152.6969°E) which contains barbecues and toilets allowing trucks and caravans to stop overnight.
