= Cedar Pocket, Queensland =

Cedar Pocket
- Suburb
- Interactive map of Cedar Pocket
- Coordinates: 26.2055°S 152.7861°E
- Country: Australia
- State: Queensland
- LGA: Gympie Region
- Location: 11.6 km (7.2 mi) ESE of Gympie; 183 km (114 mi) N of Brisbane

Government
  - State electorate: Gympie
  - Federal division: Wide Bay

Area
  - Total: 30.6 km^{2} (11.8 sq mi)

Population
  - Total: 332 (2021 census)
  - Density: 10.85/km^{2} (28.10/sq mi)
- Time zone: UTC+10:00 (AEST)
- Postcode: 4570
Suburbs around Cedar Pocket
Greens Creek	Wolvi	Beenaam Valley
East Deep Creek	Cedar Pocket	Neusa Vale
Mothar Mountain	Mothar Mountain	Kin Kin

Cedar Pocket is a rural locality in the Gympie Region, Queensland, Australia. In the 2021 census, Cedar Pocket had a population of 332 people.

== History ==
Cedar Pocket Provisional School opened in July 1906. On 1 January 1909, it became Cedar Pocket State School. It was at 752 East Deep Creek Road (at the junction with Cedar Pocket Road, 26.19870°S 152.74732°E).

Beenam Range Provisional School opened in 1912 as a half-time provisional school in conjunction with Wolvi East Provisional School (meaning they shared a single teacher). It became a full-time provisional school circa 1915/1916, but closed in March 1919. It reopened on 27 October 1924 as Beenam Range State School. It was at approx 1106 Cedar Pocket Road (26.21669°S 152.79997°E). (Note that the spelling of the school differs from the spelling of the nearby mountain range, which is Beenaam Range).

In 1961, the parents of Beenam Range State School, Cedar Pocket State School, Cootharaba Road State School, and Neusa Vale State School voted in favour of replacing those schools with a central school in the area. Cedar Park State School and Beenam Range State School closed in 1965 with the new Gympie East State School opening in neighbouring Greens Creek on 25 January 1965.

== Demographics ==
In the 2016 census Cedar Pocket had a population of 339 people.

In the 2021 census, Cedar Pocket had a population of 332 people.

== Heritage listing ==
Cedar Pocket School of Arts on Cedar Pocket Road is listed on the Gympie Local Heritage Register.

== Education ==
There are no schools in Cedar Pocket. The nearest government primary schools are Gympie East State School in neighbouring Greens Creek to the north-west and Wolvi State School in neighbouring Wolvi to the north. The nearest government secondary school is Gympie State High School in Gympie to the west.

== Community groups ==
The Cedar Pocket branch of the Queensland Country Women's Association meets at the Cedar Pocket Hall at 483 Cedar Pocket Road.
