= Veteran, Queensland =

Veteran Gympie, Queensland
- Coordinates: 26.1486°S 152.7041°E
- Population: 959 (2021 census)
  - Density: 29.97/km^{2} (77.62/sq mi)
- Postcode(s): 4570
- Area: 32.0 km^{2} (12.4 sq mi)
- Time zone: AEST (UTC+10:00)
- Location: 7.0 km (4 mi) NE of Gympie; 172 km (107 mi) N of Brisbane
- LGA(s): Gympie Region
- State electorate(s): Gympie
- Federal division(s): Wide Bay
Suburbs around Veteran:
North Deep Creek	North Deep Creek	Ross Creek
Banks Pocket; Araluen	Veteran	Canina
Victory Heights	East Deep Creek	Greens Creek

Veteran is a rural residential locality in the Gympie Region, Queensland, Australia. In the 2021 census, Veteran had a population of 959 people.

== Geography ==
Veteran is 8 kilometres (5 mi) north-east of the centre of Gympie.

The southern part of the locality is predominantly used for rural residential purposes with the northern part more used for grazing on native vegetation.

== History ==
In 1930 land was reserved for a School of Arts. The School of Arts Hall opened in 1932.

== Demographics ==
In the 2006 census, Veteran had a population of 718.

In the 2016 census, Veteran had a population of 892 people.

In the 2021 census, Veteran had a population of 959 people.

== Heritage listings ==
Veteran has the following heritage listings:

- 594 Sandy Creek Road (26.1353°S 152.7016°E): Veteran School of Arts Hall

== Education ==
There are no schools in Veteran. The nearest government primary schools are Gympie East State School in neighbouring Greens Creek to the south-east, Gympie West State School in Gympie to the south-west, and Chatsworth State School in Chatsworth to the west. The nearest government secondary schools are Gympie State High School and James Nash State High School, both in Gympie.
