= East Deep Creek, Queensland =

East Deep Creek
- Suburb
- Interactive map of East Deep Creek
- Coordinates: 26.2°S 152.7166°E
- Country: Australia
- State: Queensland
- LGA: Gympie Region
- Location: 6.9 km (4.3 mi) ESE of Gympie; 176 km (109 mi) N of Brisbane

Government
  - State electorate: Gympie
  - Federal division: Wide Bay

Area
  - Total: 18.6 km^{2} (7.2 sq mi)

Population
  - Total: 698 (2021 census)
  - Density: 37.53/km^{2} (97.2/sq mi)
- Time zone: UTC+10:00 (AEST)
- Postcode: 4570
Suburbs around East Deep Creek
Victory Heights	Veteran	Greens Creek
Monkland	East Deep Creek	Cedar Pocket
Monkland	Mothar Mountain	Mothar Mountain

East Deep Creek is a rural locality in the Gympie Region, Queensland, Australia. In the 2021 census, East Deep Creek had a population of 698 people.

== Geography ==
The corridor of the North Coast railway line forms the western boundary of the locality. Deep Creek forms the northern boundary of the locality; the creek becomes a tributary of the Mary River in Gympie.

The Bruce Highway enters the locality from the south (Mothar Mountain) and passes through the west of the locality loosely parallel with the railway line and exists to the north-west (Victory Heights).

The main road passing through the locality is East Deep Creek Road which enters the locality from the west (Monkland) and winds across the locality in a generally easterly direction until it exits to the east (Cedar Pocket).

The land use is a mixture of grazing on native vegetation and rural residential housing. In the south-west of the locality is an industrial area and a former mine site which is currently being rehabilitated to create further industrial land through the Orbelo Rehabilitation Project.

== Demographics ==
In the 2016 census, East Deep Creek had a population of 645 people.

In the 2021 census, East Deep Creek had a population of 698 people.

== Economy ==
Nolans Meats is an abattoir at 171 East Deep Creek Road (26.1961°S 152.7008°E).

== Education ==
There are no schools in East Deep Creek. The nearest government primary schools are Gympie East State School in neighbouring Greens Creek to the north-west, One Mile State School in Gympie to the west, and Monkland State School in neighbouring Monkland to the south-west. The nearest government secondary school is Gympie State High School in Gympie.

There are also non-government schools in Gympie and its surrounding suburbs.
