= Monkland, Queensland =

Monkland Gympie, Queensland
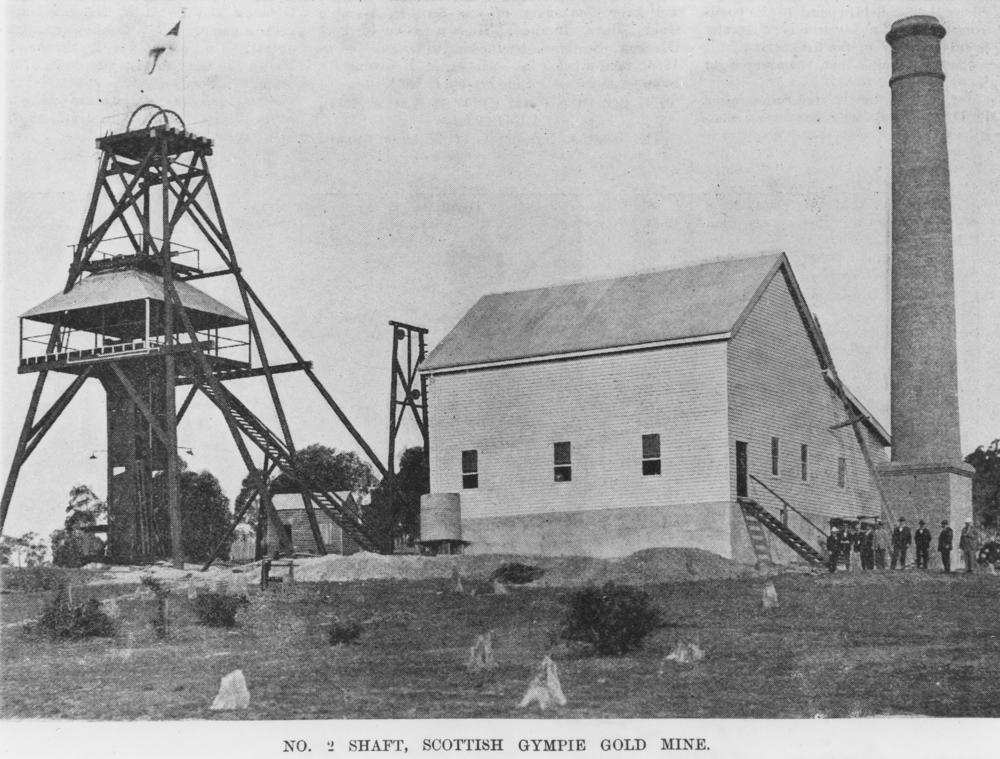
- Scottish Gympie Gold Mine, No. 2 shaft, 1900

- Coordinates: 26.2097°S 152.6861°E
- Population: 1,135 (2021 census)
  - Density: 206.4/km^{2} (534/sq mi)
- Postcode(s): 4570
- Elevation: 63 m (207 ft)
- Area: 5.5 km^{2} (2.1 sq mi)
- Time zone: AEST (UTC+10:00)
- Location: 4 km (2 mi) SSE of Gympie; 164 km (102 mi) N of Brisbane
- LGA(s): Gympie Region
- State electorate(s): Gympie
- Federal division(s): Wide Bay
Suburbs around Monkland:
Gympie	Victory Heights	East Deep Creek
Gympie	Monkland	East Deep Creek
Southside	Glanmire	Mothar Mountain

Monkland is a rural locality in the Gympie Region, Queensland, Australia. In the 2021 census, Monkland had a population of 1,135 people.

== Geography ==
Monkland is a suburb of Gympie, 4 kilometres (2 mi) south-east of the centre of Gympie on the north-east bank of the Mary River. The Bruce Highway passes through from south to north-west, and Brisbane Road (State Route 15) diverges to the north and then north-east from the highway. Between these two roads is the Lake Alford Recreational Park, which includes the Goldminer’s Monument. The eastern boundary of the locality is immediately to the east of the North Coast railway line, with Glanmire railway station serving the locality (26.2075°S 152.6942°E).

== History ==
The Gympie region was the site of a gold rush in the late 1860s and onwards, and the suburb of Monkland, named by a prospector after a town in Scotland, itself contained a number of profitable mines including the No.2 Great Eastern Gold Mine. By 1873, rapid expansion of the area had led to the construction of a number of shops and four hotels in the main street, with many families living in the area.

In April 1873 the Primitive Methodist Church opened their enlarged church building, while the construction of a Presbyterian Church was underway.

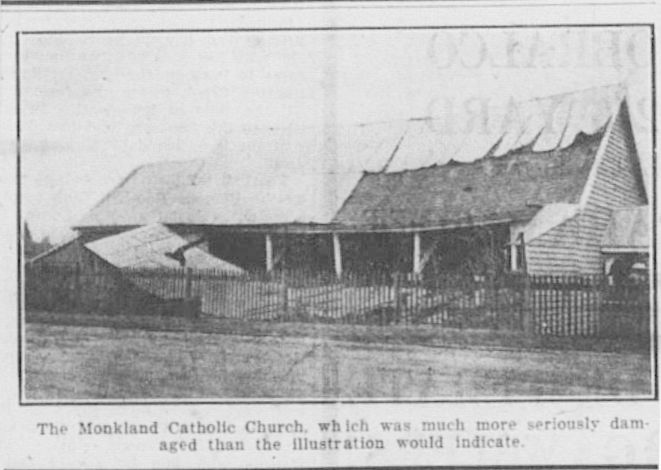
St Joseph's Catholic Church, wrecked by a tornado, 24 September 1932

St Joseph's Catholic Church opened in 1875 on the corner of Araluen Terrace and Brisbane Road (26.208712°S 152.682°E). In 1932, it was destroyed by a tornado. On Sunday 26 March 1933, Archbishop James Duhig blessed the new St Joseph's church-and-school that replaced it.

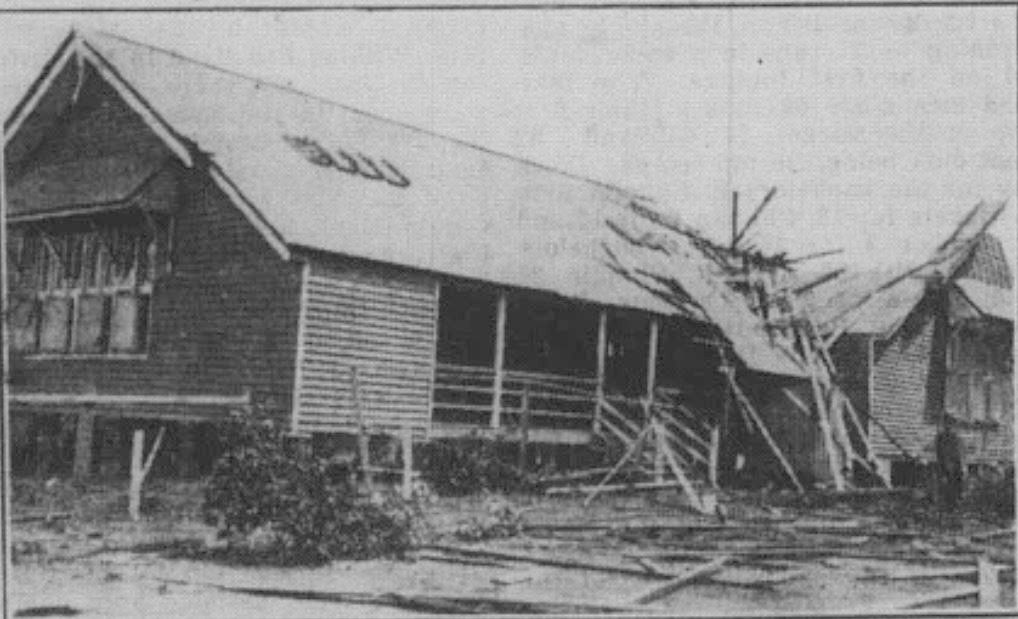
Monkland State School, after the tornado, 1932

In 1880, a public meeting called for the establishment of a school, due to the number of families in the district and the long walk to the One Mile State School which had been established in 1869. Monkland State School opened on 24 September 1884 with 74 pupils in attendance. The school was struck by a tornado in 1932, and a new building had to be constructed. An extensive reconstruction occurred in 1958, and demountables were added in the 1970s and 1980s. The original timber-frame headmaster's residence, designed by architect Robert Ferguson, is largely fenced off from the school and has been heritage listed by the Queensland Government.

The North Coast railway line was built through the area in 1889 connecting Gympie to Brisbane, which involved a considerable gradient between Monkland and Gympie of 30 metres (98 ft). The section of the line was decommissioned a hundred years later when the North Coast railway line was electrified and realigned in 1989.

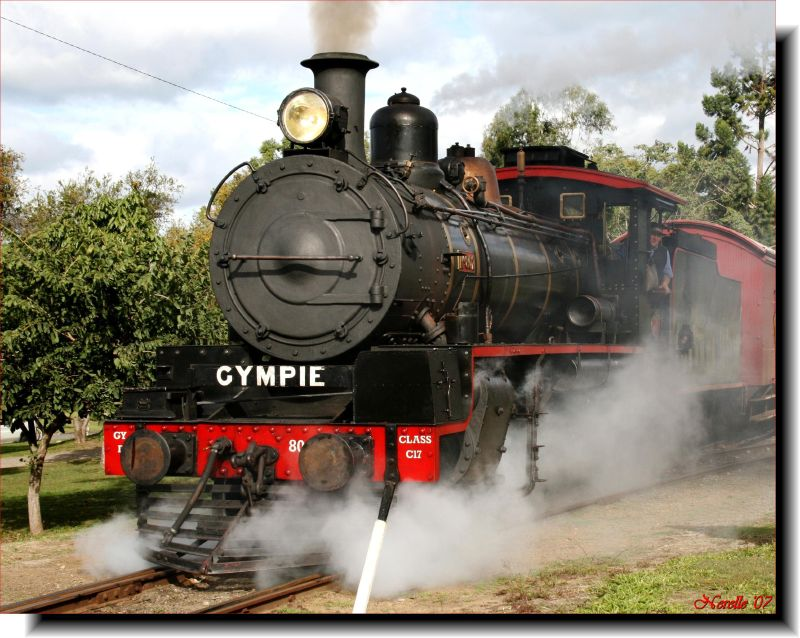
Steam locomotive on the Mary Valley railway

The Mary Valley railway line was a branch line of the North Coast railway line, which branched west at Monkland railway station (26.2110°S 152.6845°E) and continued to Brooloo in the upper Mary Valley. It was constructed between 1911 and April 1915 to facilitate closer settlement of the Mary River valley. The line reached Kandanga railway station in February 1914 and the terminus of Brooloo in April 1915. In March 1920 an extension of 10 miles 20 chains (16.5 km) to Kenilworth was approved at an estimated cost of £175,000. However, the extension was never constructed. By the 1970s the line become increasingly unprofitable, due to the economic impact on the dairying industry of lower butter consumption due to competition of margarine and the loss of the United Kingdom export market when the UK entered the European Economic Community. The Wide Bay Co-Operative Butter Factory in Gympie (Australia's largest butter factory in 1925) closed in May 1978 after nearly 80 years of operation. In 1988 staff were withdrawn from Imbil, Amamoor and Dagun. The pineapple industry lobbied successfully to keep the line operational until 1995. The Mary Valley Heritage Railway Board proposed to operate a tourist train on the line in 1996 using volunteers and trainees. The tourist train service known as the Mary Valley Rattler commenced on 23 May 1998.

The closure of the Mary Valley railway line and the realignment of the North Coast railway line resulted in the closure of Monkland railway station, but it is now listed on the Gympie Local Heritage Register.

The Polleys bus company operated services from Monkland to Gympie in the 1970s.

== Demographics ==
In the 2006 census, Monkland had a population of 1,042 people.

In the 2016 census, Monkland had a population of 1,125 people.

In the 2021 census, Monkland had a population of 1,135 people.

== Heritage listings ==
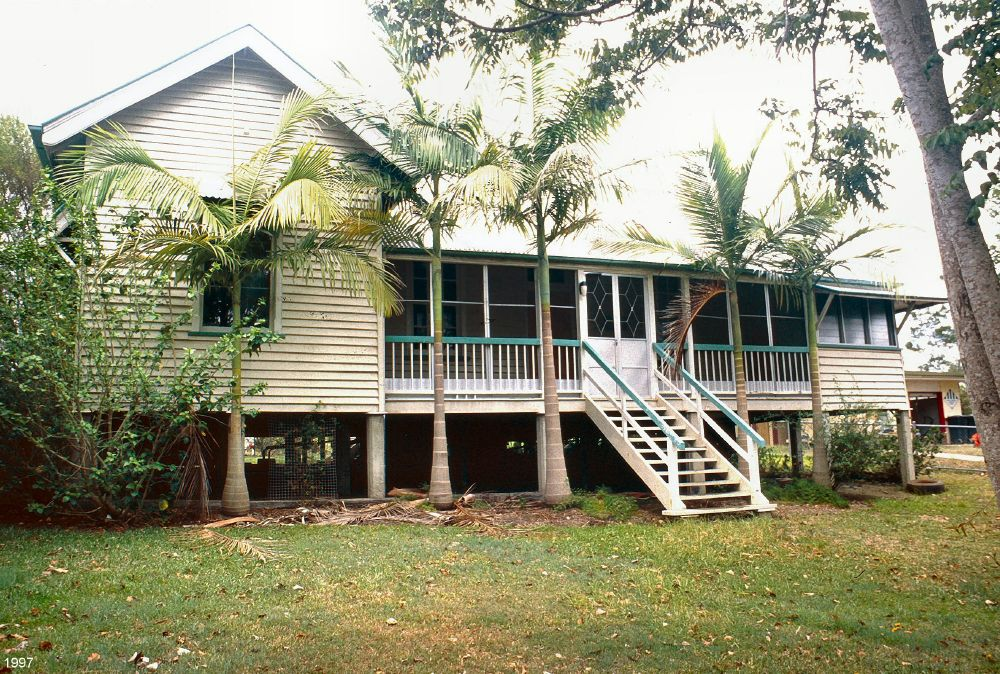
Monkland State School Residence, 1997

Monkland has a number of heritage-listed sites, including:

- No. 1 Scottish Gympie Mine and Battery, Old Brisbane Road (26.2156°S 152.689°E)
- Monkland State School, Brisbane Road
- Monkland State School Residence, Brisbane Road (26.2129°S 152.6871°E)
- Monkland Railway Station, Brisbane Road
- Inglewood Hill Pottery, 208 Brisbane Road
- Andrew Fisher's Cottage, 215 Brisbane Road (26.2132°S 152.6845°E)

== Economy ==
Monkland has a small industrial area and a particle board plant operated by Laminex, previously operated by Carter Holt Harvey until 2019.

== Education ==
Monkland State School is a government primary (Prep–6) school for boys and girls at 220 Brisbane Road (26.2138°S 152.6859°E). In 2018 the school had an enrolment of 78 students with 17 teachers (14 full-time equivalent) and 16 non-teaching staff (8 full-time equivalent).

There is no secondary school in Monkland. The nearest government secondary school is Gympie State High School located about two kilometres away in Gympie to the north.

== Amenities ==
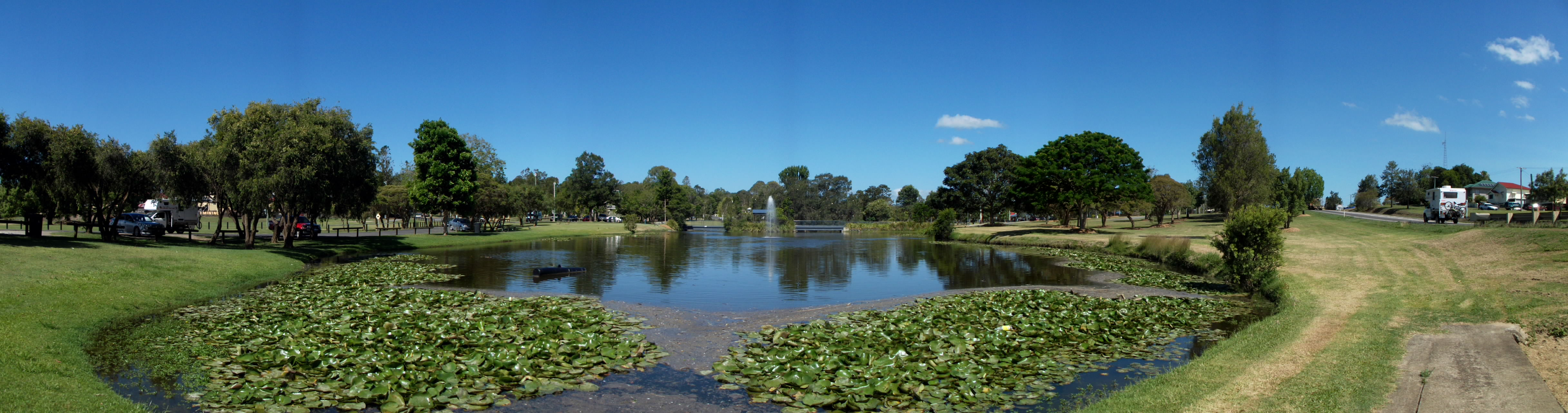
Lake Alford, 2013

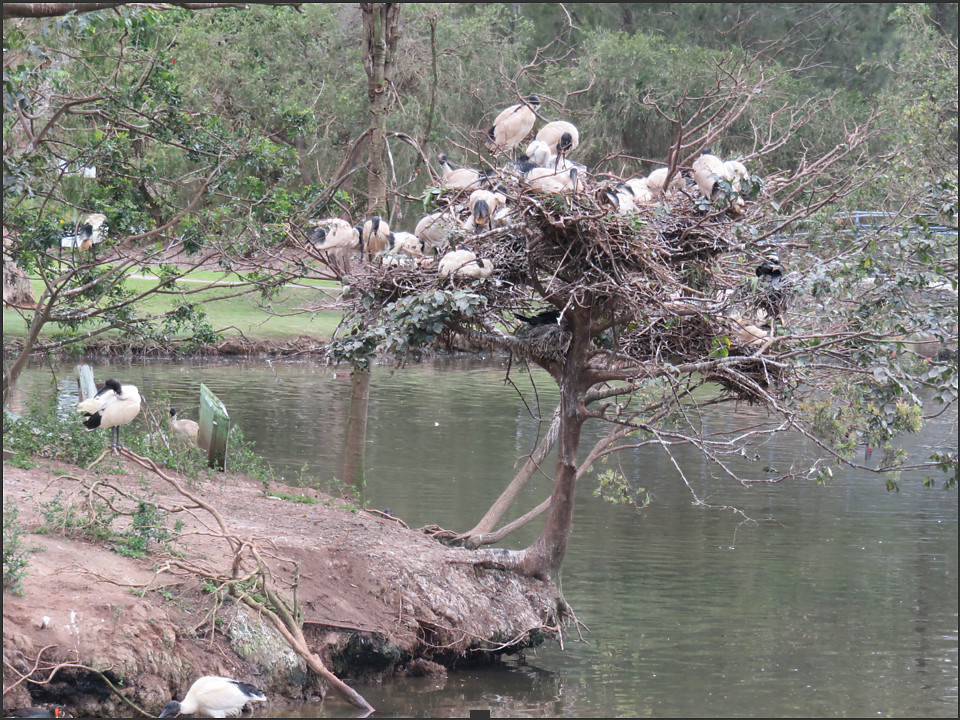
Australian White Ibis nesting in Lake Alford park, 2022

Lake Alford Park located beside the Bruce Highway (26.2159°S 152.6858°E) contains an all-abilities playground and is known for the range of bird life around the lake.

== Attractions ==
Monkland contains the Gympie Gold Mining and Historical Museum, which contains a collection of documentation, artifacts and photographs, with each building in the museum exploring different aspects of the history of the Gympie region, and containing parts of the former No.2 Great Eastern Gold Mine. The personal collection of Andrew Fisher, an early Labor Prime Minister of Australia who represented the area in the Federal Parliament, is also located there.

The Monkland railway station, built in 1911, is part of the Mary Valley Rattler.
