= Kia Ora, Queensland =

Kia Ora
- Suburb
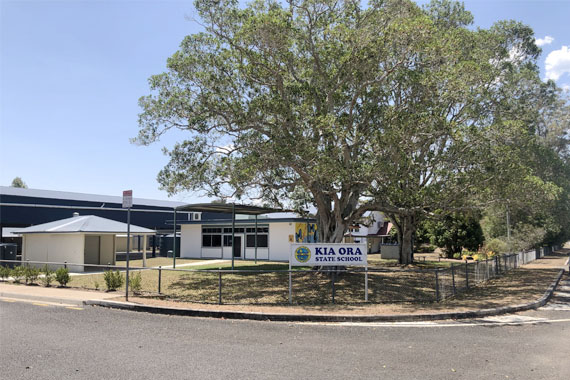
- Kia-Ora State School, 2020

- Interactive map of Kia Ora
- Coordinates: 26.0155°S 152.7658°E
- Country: Australia
- State: Queensland
- LGA: Gympie Region
- Location: 27.6 km (17.1 mi) NE of Gympie; 31.5 km (19.6 mi) SW of Tin Can Bay; 200 km (120 mi) N of Brisbane

Government
  - State electorate: Gympie
  - Federal division: Wide Bay

Area
  - Total: 22.5 km^{2} (8.7 sq mi)

Population
  - Total: 218 (2021 census)
  - Density: 9.69/km^{2} (25.09/sq mi)
- Time zone: UTC+10:00 (AEST)
- Postcode: 4570
Suburbs around Kia Ora
Neerdie	Neerdie	Toolara Forest
Neerdie	Kia Ora	Toolara Forest
Downsfield	Goomboorian	Toolara Forest

Kia Ora is a rural locality in the Gympie Region, Queensland, Australia. In the 2021 census, Kia Ora had a population of 218 people.

== History ==
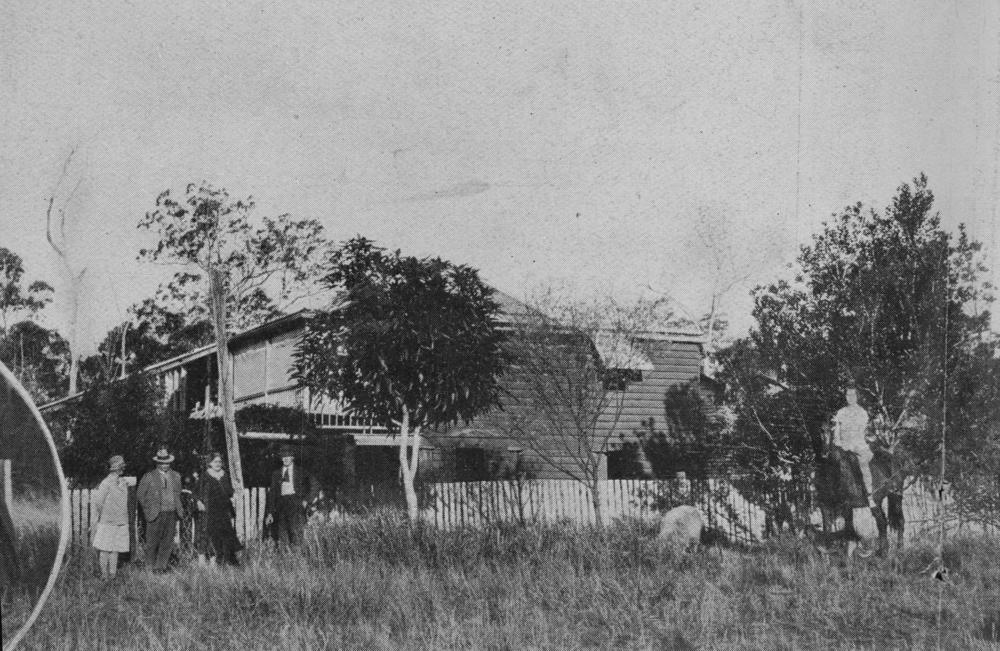
Kia Ora Station homestead, 1931

The district takes its name from the Kia-Ora pastoral property operated by the Elliott family. The name comes from the Māori greeting Kia ora.

Kia-Ora Provisional School opened on 18 July 1921 on land donated by the Elliott family. It became a state school in 1927.

In 1931, the main industries were dairying and forestry.

The Kia Ora Methodist Church opened in September 1938, becoming a Uniting Church following the 1977 amalgamation. It was at 2755 Anderleigh Road (26.02878°S 152.77777°E). It closed circa 1990 and was subsequently sold and converted to a house.

On 9 December 1950, the Kia Ora Memorial Hall was erected to honour those who served in war..

== Demographics ==
In the 2011 census, Kia Ora had a population of 501 people.

In the 2016 census, Kia Ora had a population of 205 people.

In the 2021 census, Kia Ora had a population of 218 people.

== Heritage listings ==
Kia Ora has the following heritage sites:

- Kia Ora School, 2572 Anderleigh Road
- Kia Ora Methodist Church, 2755 Anderleigh Road

== Education ==
Kia-Ora State School is a government primary (Prep-6) school for boys and girls at 2754 Anderleigh Road (26.0284°S 152.7773°E). In 2017, the school had an enrolment of 62 students with 4 teachers and 11 non-teaching staff (5 full-time equivalent).

There are no secondary schools in Kia Ora. The nearest government secondary schools are Gympie State High School (to Year 12) in Gympie to the south-west and Tin Can Bay State School (to Year 10) in Tin Can Bay to the north-east.

== Amenities ==
Kia Ora Public Memorial Hall is at 2740 Anderleigh Road (26.02733°S 152.77724°E).
