= Chatsworth, Queensland =

Chatsworth Gympie, Queensland
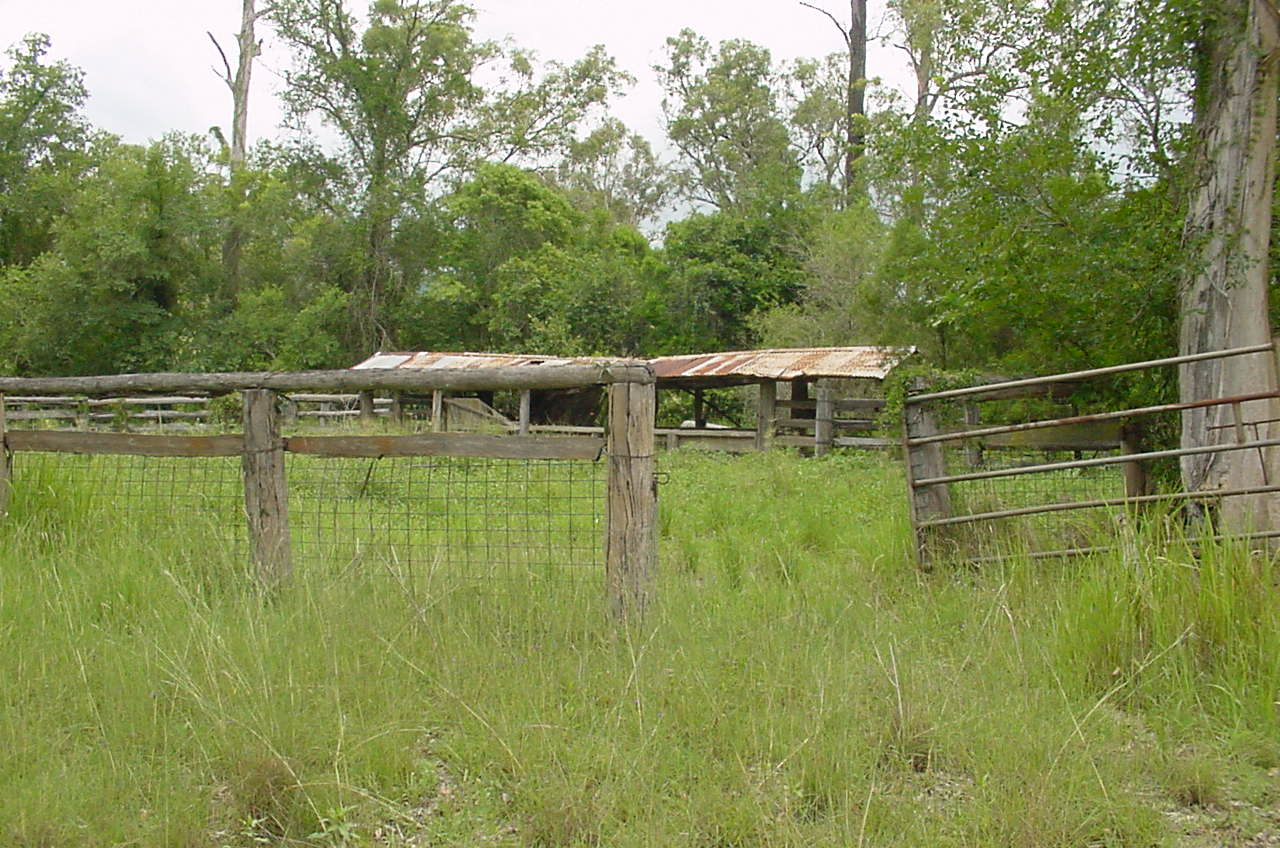
- Horton Road cattle dip, 2002

- Coordinates: 26.1444°S 152.6138°E
- Population: 1,353 (2021 census)
  - Density: 43.65/km^{2} (113.04/sq mi)
- Postcode(s): 4570
- Area: 31.0 km^{2} (12.0 sq mi)
- Time zone: AEST (UTC+10:00)
- Location: 7.6 km (5 mi) NW of Gympie; 183 km (114 mi) N of Brisbane
- LGA(s): Gympie Region
- State electorate(s): Gympie
- Federal division(s): Wide Bay
Suburbs around Chatsworth:
Bells Bridge	Curra	Corella
Bells Bridge	Chatsworth	Tamaree
Fishermans Pocket	Fishermans Pocket	Araluen; Two Mile

Chatsworth is a rural locality in the Gympie Region, Queensland, Australia. In the 2021 census, Chatsworth had a population of 1,353 people.

== Geography ==
Chatsworth is located about 7.5 kilometres (5 mi) north-northwest of Gympie, Queensland, Australia.

Fishermans Pocket State Forest occupies a large section of the south west of Chatsworth.

== History ==
Historically, the suburb was mostly used for dairy farming, but is now predominantly used for residential land. The area was once part of the Shire of Cooloola a former local government area.

Chatsworth Wesleyan Methodist Church opened on Sunday 16 August 1885. It was on the Chatsworth Road (now the Bruce Highway). In November 1937, the Methodist Church at Chatsworth was relocated to a new 0.5-acre (0.20 ha) site adjacent to the South Side State School (about 6 miles (9.7 km) away, where it was officially opened by Reverend Ira Menear.

On Sunday 11 October 1885, St Jude's Anglican church opened at Chatsworth.

Chatsworth Provisional School opened on 18 April 1900. On 1 January 1909, it became Chatsworth State School.

Chatsworth Baptist Church opened on Saturday 17 August 1918.

== Demographics ==
In the 2016 census Chatsworth had a population of 1,055 people.

In the 2021 census, Chatsworth had a population of 1,353 people.

== Heritage listings ==
Chatsworth has the following heritage listings:

- Chatsworth Hall, 3 Allen Road
- Chatsworth School, 15 Rammutt Road

== Education ==
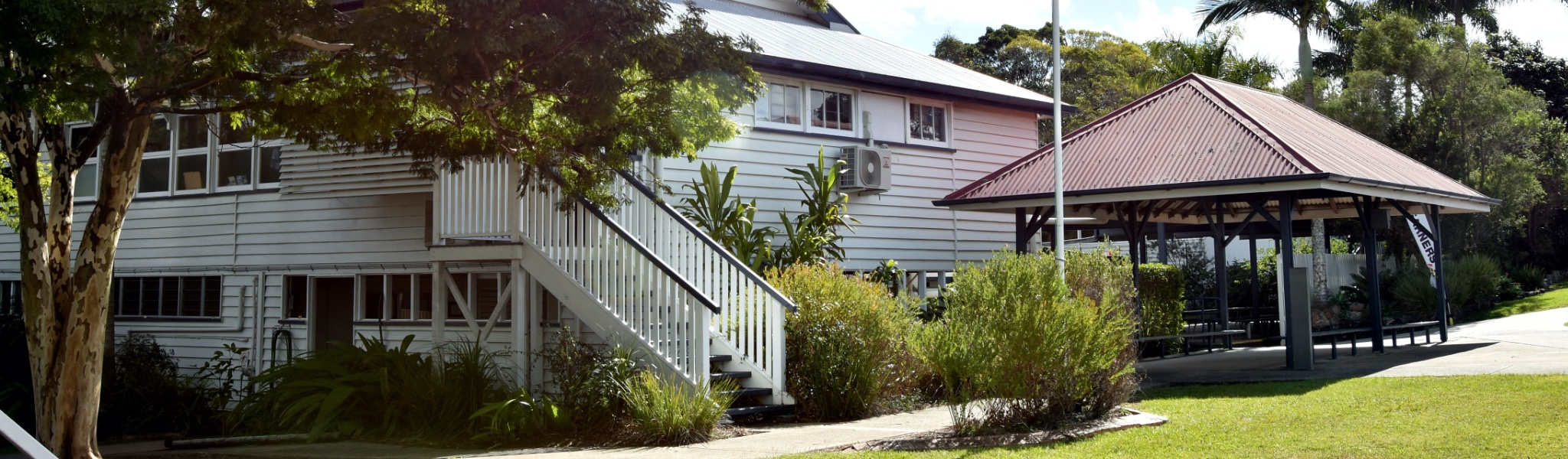
Chatsworth State School, 2020

Chatsworth State School is a government primary (Prep-6) school for boys and girls at 15 Rammutt Road (26.1428°S 152.6154°E). In 2018, the school had an enrolment of 232 students with 22 teachers (17 full-time equivalent) and 14 non-teaching staff (9 full-time equivalent). It includes a special education program.

There are no secondary schools in Chatsworth. The nearest government secondary school is James Nash State High School in Gympie to the south-east.

There are also non-government schools in Gympie and its suburbs.

== Amenities ==
Expansion Church (formerly Christian Family Church) is at 38 Fritz Road (26.1523°S 152.6342°E). It is a member of the Australian Christian Churches.
