= Greens Creek, Queensland =

Greens Creek
- Suburb
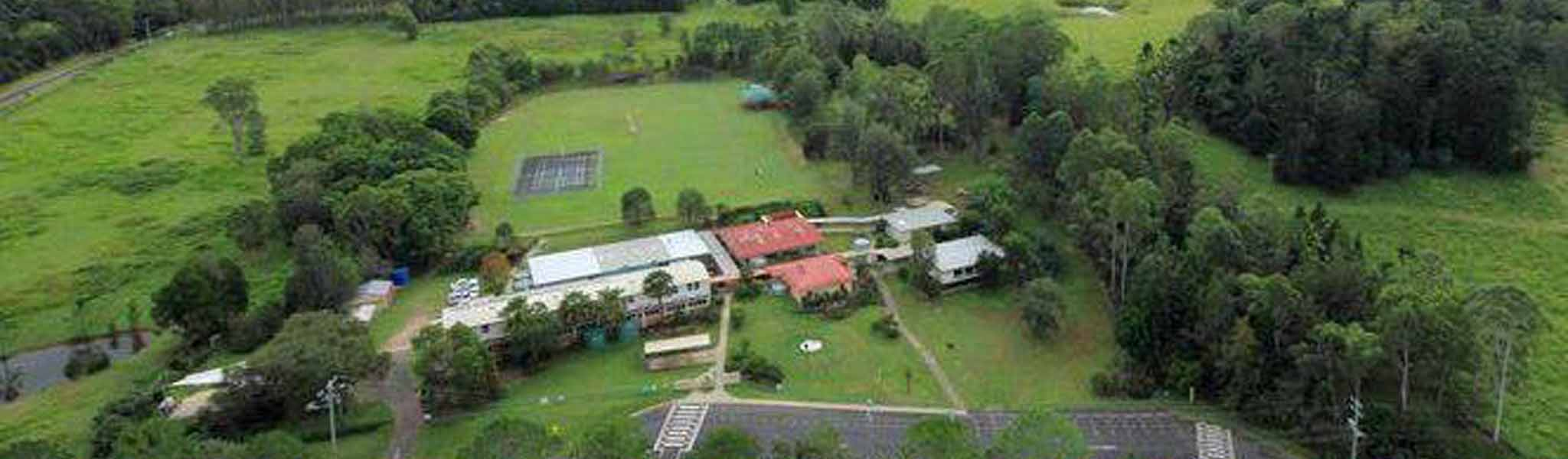
- Gympie East State School, 2020

- Interactive map of Greens Creek
- Coordinates: 26.1722°S 152.7486°E
- Country: Australia
- State: Queensland
- LGA: Gympie Region
- Location: 9.9 km (6.2 mi) E of Gympie; 183 km (114 mi) N of Brisbane

Government
  - State electorate: Gympie
  - Federal division: Wide Bay

Area
  - Total: 19.3 km^{2} (7.5 sq mi)

Population
  - Total: 344 (2021 census)
  - Density: 17.82/km^{2} (46.16/sq mi)
- Time zone: UTC+10:00 (AEST)
- Postcode: 4570
Suburbs around Greens Creek
Canina	Canina	Wolvi
Veteran	Greens Creek	Wolvi
East Deep Creek	Cedar Pocket	Cedar Pocket

Greens Creek is a rural locality in the Gympie Region, Queensland, Australia. In the 2021 census, Greens Creek had a population of 344 people.

== History ==
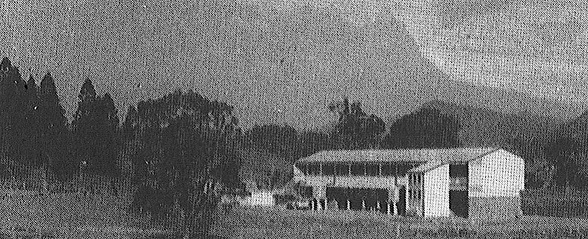
Gympie East State School, shortly after opening

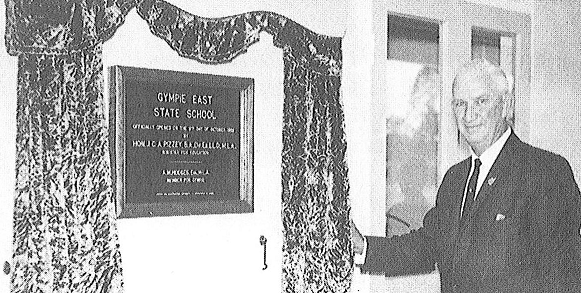
Official opening of Gympie East State School by Minister for Public Instruction, Jack Pizzey, 9 October 1965

Cootharaba Road Provisional School opened on 12 February 1894. On 7 June 1899, it became Cootharaba Road State School. It was at 27 Grecian Bends Road (26.16932°S 152.71768°E).

In 1961, the parents of Beenam Range State School, Cedar Pocket State School, Cootharaba Road State School, and Neusa Vale State School voted in favour of replacing those schools with a central school in the area. Cootharaba Road State School closed in 1925 when the new Gympie East State School opened in Greens Creek on 25 January 1965. It was officially opened on 9 October 1965 by the Minister for Public Instruction, Jack Pizzey.

As at September 2022, the two school buildings of Cootharaba Road State School are still extant on the site.

== Demographics ==
In the 2016 census, Greens Creek had a population of 326 people.

In the 2021 census, Greens Creek had a population of 344 people.

== Education ==
Gympie East State School is a government primary (Prep-6) school for boys and girls at 219 Cedar Pocket Road (26.1798°S 152.7327°E). In 2018, the school had an enrolment of 140 students with 10 teachers (8 full-time equivalent) and 9 non-teaching staff (6 full-time equivalent).

There are no secondary schools in Greens Creek. The nearest government secondary school is Gympie State High School in Gympie to the south-west.
