= Imbil Railway Bridge =

Railway bridge over Yabba Creek in Queensland, Australia

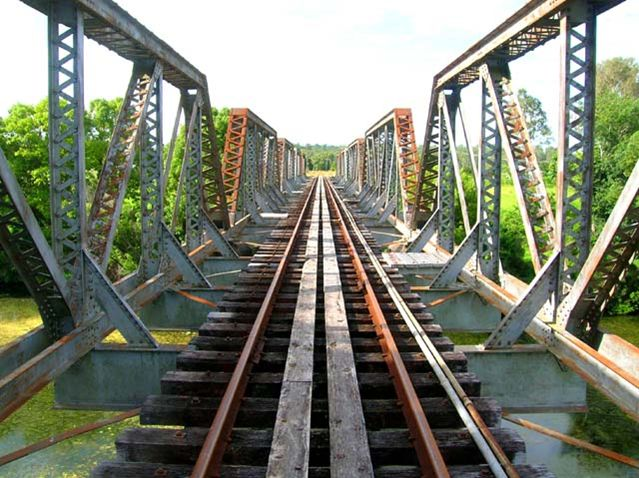
- Imbil Railway Bridge, view along the tracks, 2009

- Location within Queensland Location within Australia
- 26.4583°S 152.6756°E
- Location: Over Yabba Creek, Imbil, Gympie Region, Queensland, Australia

History
- Design period: 1900–1914 (early 20th century)
- Built: 1915–

Queensland Heritage Register
- Official name: Imbil Railway Bridge
- Type: state heritage (built)
- Designated: 14 October 2011
- Reference no.: 602791
- Significant period: 1915–
- Builders: Queensland Railways

Imbil Railway Bridge is a heritage-listed railway bridge over Yabba Creek, Imbil, Gympie Region, Queensland, Australia. It was built circa 1915 by Queensland Railways to facilitate settlement in the Mary River Valley. It was added to the Queensland Heritage Register on 14 October 2011.

== History ==
The Imbil Railway Bridge over Yabba Creek is located near the town of Imbil on the Mary Valley branch railway (now the Mary Valley Rattler line) 22 miles 4 chains (35.5 km) from Monkland station on the North Coast railway line. The Mary Valley railway line between Monkland station and Brooloo in the upper Mary Valley was constructed between 1911 and April 1915 to facilitate closer settlement of the Mary River valley. The Imbil Railway Bridge remains as evidence of the economic importance of the Mary Valley to Queensland agriculture during the 20th century. This half-through Pratt truss (or Pony truss) bridge, completed in January 1915, is one of only six bridges of this kind known to be remaining in Queensland.

European settlement in the Mary Valley commenced when squatters took up pastoral leases there in the 1850s. Closer settlement in the Mary Valley started after half of Imbil station land was resumed for settlement under the Crown Lands Act 1868 and made available for selection. The gradual opening of the large pastoral holdings of Amamoor, Imbil and Traveston in the Upper Mary River Valley for closer settlement from the late 1870s was a catalyst for the development of small cropping and dairying activities in the region. The changing patterns of land use and settlement in the Mary Valley occurred while nearby Gympie evolved from its beginnings as a makeshift settlement and alluvial field of late 1867 into an important regional town and major deep reef gold producer by the 1880s. The township provided a ready market for the growing number of agricultural producers in the surrounding district. In the Mary Valley, maize and potatoes were the dominant early crops, although experimental plantings of tobacco, rice, sugar cane, peas and pineapples were also undertaken.

At the beginning of the 20th century the Queensland government promoted the construction of branch railways in rural areas to assist growth in population and agricultural production. In the 1880s a Mary Valley route had been among the proposals for the line from Brisbane to Gympie, but was rejected. Local agitation for a Mary Valley branch railway (with varying proposals for the route's alignment) increased during the 1900s. The Railway Commissioner investigated and surveyed a proposed line for the Mary Valley in 1910, with the accompanying report contending "considerable traffic in agricultural produce, timber, livestock and dairy products" would eventuate. Subsequently, a route deviating from the North Coast line at Monkland (south of Gympie) and extending to Brooloo was approved, a decision aided by the availability of timber for freight and construction, and Gympie City Council's offer to fund 1/3 of construction costs. Work commenced in June 1911 and by 1913, 550 men were working on the project. The Mary Valley Railway Line included four major (concrete and steel) bridges and one tunnel at Melawondi. The line reached Kandanga in February 1914 and the terminus of Brooloo in April 1915, the month the whole line was officially opened for passenger and goods traffic. Along the line, subdivisions of a number of larger holdings into farm and town allotments near rail stops increased the availability agricultural land for settlers and led to establishment of small townships at Kandanga (1912), Brooloo, Imbil and Amamoor (1914) and Dagun (1917).

The Imbil Railway Bridge illustrates the evolution in the principal characteristics of steel railway bridges around the turn of the century, especially the change to the through and half-through Pratt trusses from 1908, which increased the structural strength of rail bridges. Early rail bridges in Queensland were half-through or deck-type lattice girders with through hogback central spans until the 1893 after which the Whipple truss (double intersection through Pratt truss) was used for strength until the introduction of the through Pratt truss in 1897. For the next two decades many of Queensland's rail bridges were of the through Pratt design, including the half-through Pratt for lighter loads (introduced 1909), which features top and bottom chords connected by vertical and diagonal members but no portal or lateral bracing between the two parallel trusses on either side of the rail deck. The Warren truss was introduced later.

During the interwar period the rapid increase in production in the Mary Valley made a significant contribution to the Gympie region's status as one of Queensland's most productive dairy areas. In response to cream supply outgrowing production capacity, the Wide Bay Co-Operative built what was claimed as Australia's largest butter factory in 1925, and was receiving cream from 2,000 suppliers by 1935. By 1927 the Gympie district was responsible for 10% of Queensland's milk production, the majority of which was used for butter making. In 1929 the Wide Bay district (of which Gympie was a part) was the second highest milk producer after the Moreton district, and by 1939 the 12 butter factories in the Wide Bay-Burnett region (not including Cooroy), produced almost 1/3 of Queensland's butter. In the same year, 4,500 cream cans were forwarded from Kandanga alone.

In 1952 the Gympie district produced 15% of Queensland's butter, and 1953 was the Wide Bay Co-Operative's record year for payment to its suppliers. However, a downturn began in the 1950s, which reflected changes occurring across the industry in Queensland. Butter consumption per capita in Australia dropped from 12.2 kilograms (27 lb) to 8.3 kilograms (18 lb) between 1957 and 1972, and a major butter market was lost in the early 1970s, after Britain joined the European Economic Community. Changing to milk production rather than cream, required larger herds and new equipment, and resulted in many small-scale farmers leaving the industry or switching to beef cattle. Stricter regulations for the running of dairies, lower prices, foreign imports and competition from margarine producers all took their toll. Between 1973 and 1976 28% of the Wide Bay Co-op's farmers left the industry. As milk production increased, farm storage in vats and road transportation by tankers became the norm. The last butter was churned in Gympie in May 1978, ending nearly 80 years of production at the site.

While fruit continued to be transported on the Mary Valley railway following the demise of cream production, the line became increasingly unprofitable during the 1970s. By the late 1980s, the future of the line was increasingly precarious. In 1988 station masters/mistresses were removed from Imbil, Amamoor and Dagun and a number of railway buildings such as goods sheds, waiting sheds and residences were sold for removal.

The reduction of infrastructure and services on the railway made it increasingly apparent that the line was to close. Strong protests by the district's pineapple growers helped to delay any final decision on the line's future. However, the last goods train ran to Kandanga in 1995 and thereafter pineapple growers took their produce to Traveston station on the Brisbane-Gympie North line. Despite this, the line was not formally closed and in 1996 the Mary Valley Heritage Railway Board negotiated to conduct tourist train services on the line. The Mary Valley Heritage Railway commenced operations on the former Mary Valley branch on 23 May 1998. The "Valley Rattler" steam train tours and rail motor rides have since become a major tourist attraction for the region. A large group of volunteers and trainees contribute to the operation and maintenance of the line, rolling stock and buildings between the (former) Gympie railway station and Imbil railway station.

The Imbil Railway Bridge remains as evidence of the economic importance of the Mary Valley to the Queensland dairy industry during the 20th century. The Imbil Railway Bridge is a rare intact example of a half-through Pratt truss railway bridge, a style of bridge used by Queensland's Railway Department in the first three decades of the 20th century. The half-through Pratt truss structure, which differs subtly from the more widely used through Pratt truss bridge, in that its girders are not high enough to allow cross bracing at the top between the trusses on each side of the bridge. Half-through Pratt truss bridges were designed to carry a smaller load than through Pratt truss bridges. Other intact bridges of this type that are extant are: Harlin Rail Bridge, Harlin (1912); Sleeper Log Creek (1915); Saltwater Creek (1915); Crystal Creek (1916) and Murray Creek (1923).

== Description ==
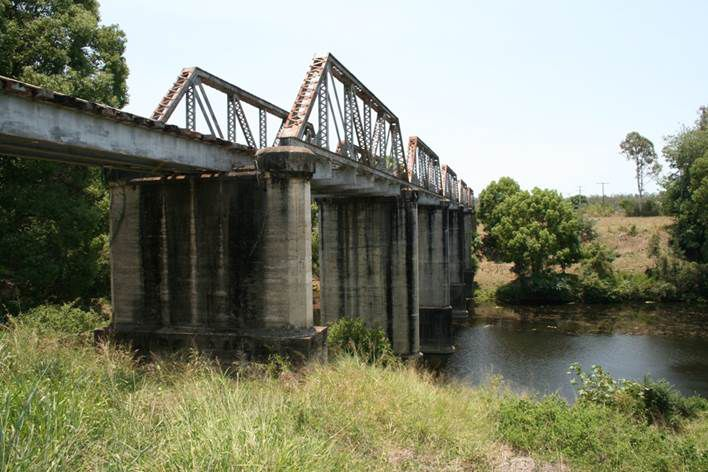
Imbil Railway Bridge, 2009

The Imbil Rail Bridge is a high level steel and concrete bridge over Yabba Creek, located 22 miles 4 chains (35.5 km) from Monkland on the Mary Valley branch line.

Its total length is 393 feet (120 m) and its maximum span is 60 feet (18 m). The bridge has five steel eight-panel half-through Pratt trusses and is supported by two concrete abutments and nine concrete piers.

The bridge comprises (North to South):

- 2 × 3 x 31-foot (9.4 m) rolled steel joists, decking, concrete abutment, common concrete pier on cylindrical base (piers 1 and 2);
- 5 x 60-foot (18 m) riveted 8-panel half-through Pratt trusses, decking, common concrete piers with octagonal ends with capping on cylindrical bases (piers 2 to 7);
- 2 × 3 x 31-foot (9.4 m) rolled steel joists, decking, common concrete pier on cylindrical base, concrete abutment (piers 7 and 8).

It retains its rails and timber sleepers.

== Heritage listing ==
Imbil Railway Bridge was listed on the Queensland Heritage Register on 14 October 2011 having satisfied the following criteria.

The place is important in demonstrating the evolution or pattern of Queensland's history.

The Imbil Railway bridge, opened in 1915 as a major engineering work on the Mary Valley Branch Railway Line, is important in demonstrating the Queensland Government's policy of establishing branch railway lines to promote closer settlement. Establishment of this branch railway accelerated the settlement of the Mary Valley for agricultural purposes and contributed to the production that made the Wide Bay Burnett district a major agricultural region of Queensland during the first half of the 20th century.

The bridge is highly intact and provides physical evidence of early 20th century railway bridge design and construction in Queensland. The Imbil Railway Bridge illustrates the evolution in the principal characteristics of steel railway bridges around the turn of the century, especially the change to the through and half-through Pratt trusses from 1908, which increased the structural strength of rail bridges.

The place demonstrates rare, uncommon or endangered aspects of Queensland's cultural heritage.

The Imbil Railway Bridge is a form of railway bridge that has always been uncommon. It is one of 11 half-through Pratt truss bridges that were built by the Queensland Department of Railways and Public Works during the first three decades of the 20th century. Of these only six remain. The structure is intact and retains a high level of integrity. Other intact railway bridges of this type that are extant are: Harlin Rail Bridge, Harlin (1912) (Harlin Rail Bridge); Sleeper Log Creek (1915); Saltwater Creek (1915); Crystal Creek (1916) and Murray Creek, North Coast line (1923).

The place is important in demonstrating the principal characteristics of a particular class of cultural places.

The Imbil Railway Bridge is a good example of a half-through Pratt truss railway bridge designed by the Department of Railways and Public Works. This bridge type differed subtly from the through Pratt truss in that its girders are not high enough to allow cross bracing at the top of the truss, which is a feature of through Pratt truss bridges.

The bridge comprises nine concrete piers, two abutments, five steel eight-panel trusses, rolled steel joists, decking, timber sleepers and steel rails.

The place is important because of its aesthetic significance.

In its setting the Imbil Railway Bridge is picturesque, making a dramatic visual statement and evoking a strong aesthetic response through the juxtaposition of its man-made materials-tall concrete piers and steel trusses-against its natural backdrop of mountains and grassy fields, trees and river. Views that place the bridge in this setting are accessible from road, rail and water.
