= Mary Valley Railway Cream Sheds =

- Location within Queensland Location within Australia
- 26.3664°S 152.6685°E
- Location: Kandanga; Amamoor; Melawondi Stations; Mary Valley Branch Railway, Mary Valley, Gympie Region, Queensland, Australia

History
- Design period: 1919–1930s (interwar period)

Site notes
- Architect: Queensland Railways

Queensland Heritage Register
- Official name: Mary Valley Railway Cream Sheds
- Type: state heritage (built)
- Designated: 14 October 2011
- Reference no.: 602792
- Significant period: 20th century
- Significant components: cream shed/stand
- Builders: Queensland Railways

Mary Valley Railway Cream Sheds are heritage-listed sheds at Kandanga railway station, Amamoor railway station and Melawondi railway station, all of them on the Mary Valley Branch Railway, Mary Valley, Gympie Region, Queensland, Australia. They were designed and built by Queensland Railways. They were added to the Queensland Heritage Register on 14 October 2011.

== History ==
The Mary Valley branch railway cream sheds, located at Amamoor railway station (26.34706°S 152.67320°E), Kandanga and Melawondi, were built between the 1920s and 1940s by Queensland Railways, in response to the strong growth of dairying in one of Queensland's most important dairy producing regions and the reliance on rail to transport dairy produce during this period.

The gradual opening of large pastoral holdings of Amamoor, Imbil and Traveston (established 1850s) in the Upper Mary River Valley for closer settlement from the late 1870s was a catalyst for the development of small cropping and dairying activities in the region. The changing patterns of land use and settlement in the Mary Valley occurred while nearby Gympie evolved from its beginnings as a makeshift settlement and alluvial field in late 1867 into an important regional town and major deep reef gold producer by the 1880s. The town provided a ready market for the growing number of agricultural producers in the surrounding district. In the Mary Valley, maize and potatoes were the dominant early crops, although experimental plantings of tobacco, rice, sugar cane, peas and pineapples were also undertaken.

From the late 1800s, a number of critical factors aided the expansion of the dairy industry into one of Queensland's principal primary industries by the interwar period. These included: the introduction of mechanical cream separators in the 1880s; Babcock testing to accurately measure cream content in milk; The Meat and Dairy Encouragement Act 1893 which made provision for government loans to construct butter and cheese factories; and the Department of Agriculture and Stock's use of a "Travelling Dairy" to demonstrate techniques and equipment to potential dairy farmers throughout Queensland. The introduction of pastures such as paspalum and Rhodes grass and the increased cultivation of fodder also occurred, to improve milk yields and to provide adequate feed during the less productive months of winter.

Hugo Du Rietz, a Swedish born architect, made an important contribution to the development of the dairy industry in the Gympie district by his introduction of the first mechanical cream separator into Queensland in 1882. The Queensland government's travelling dairy visited Lagoon Pocket, in the Mary Valley, in September 1890. By 1894 there were 120 dairies in the Gympie Land Agent's district, although most production was milk for town supply. In the Mary Valley, Frank Chippindall was transporting butter produced by local settlers into Gympie around 1885–1886, as was Peter Meyers in 1893.

By the early 1900s co-operatives were becoming the dominant form of ownership of cheese and butter factories, a pattern that defined the Queensland dairy industry for much of the 20th century. In 1897, Gympie's first dairy co-operative for butter production, the Gympie Central Dairying Company was established. By 1897 the Silverwood Dairying Company had taken over the factory and in 1906 the Wide Bay Co-Operative purchased the operations. In the year ending 30 June 1907 there were 322 suppliers to the Wide Bay Company, who were paid a total of £20,973 for their cream. Metal cans containing the cream produced by dairy farms surrounding Gympie was carted into the Wide Bay Co-operative's factory by contractors. In the Mary Valley, some cream was also sent from the Traveston railway station on the North Coast railway line to butter factories further south.

At the beginning of the twentieth century the Queensland government was promoting the construction of branch railways in rural areas to assist growth in population and agricultural production. In the 1880s a Mary Valley route had been among the proposals for the line from Brisbane to Gympie, but was rejected. Local agitation for a Mary Valley branch railway (with varying proposals for the route's alignment) increased during the 1900s. The Railway Commissioner investigated and surveyed a proposed line for the Mary Valley in 1910, with the accompanying report contending "considerable traffic in agricultural produce, timber, livestock and dairy products" would eventuate. Subsequently, a route deviating from the North Coast line at Monkland (south of Gympie) and extending to Brooloo was approved, a decision aided by the availability of timber for freight and construction, and Gympie City Council's offer to fund one third of construction costs. Work commenced in June 1911 and by 1913, 550 men were working on the project. The line reached Kandanga in February 1914 and the terminus of Brooloo in April 1915, the month the whole line was officially opened for passenger and goods traffic. Along the line, subdivisions of a number of larger holdings into farm and town allotments near rail stops increased the availability agricultural land for settlers and led to the establishment of small townships at Kandanga (1912), Brooloo, Imbil and Amamoor (1914) and Dagun (1917).

While timber freight was initially the main income generator for the Mary Valley Railway, cream was transported on the line from its very beginnings. Transportation by rail was a far more efficient way of delivering cream to butter factories, with contractors and individual farmers able to deliver their cream direct to the nearest railhead. Following delivery and washing of the cans at the factory, they were returned by rail, with each can inscribed with the name of its owner for identification.

In its first four weeks of operations following the opening of its station in 1914, two tons of cream was sent from Kandanga. After the disruption of World War I, dairying and agricultural activity increased rapidly, with a corresponding increase in the transportation of produce on the railway. In 1921 there were 93 dairies located between Dagun and Brooloo, milking 2,900 cows (an average herd size of 31) and producing 586,016 pounds (265,812 kg) of cream. In October of that year, a combined total of around 350 cans were sent from Kandanga and Imbil railway stations each week. In January 1922, 118,000 pounds (54,000 kg) of cream, equal to around 27 long tons (27 t) of butter, was sent to the Wide Bay Co-operative Factory at Gympie from suppliers between Brooloo and Amamoor.

The expansion of dairy production during the early twentieth century led to the construction of cream sheds by Queensland Railways at stations and sidings throughout the state. Cream sheds were built to a standard design; measuring 10 ft × 10 ft (3.0 m × 3.0 m), clad and lined with horizontal hardwood boards separated by open spaces, with the interior boards offset to cover the outside spaces. The spacing of the boards improved air circulation, resulting in a cooler storage space, reducing the risk of the cream spoiling before reaching the butter factory. Double doors opened out to platforms on either side of the shed for placement and retrieval of cream cans. Sheds were set on low stumps and were sheltered by a gabled roof.

By 1921, the heavy handling needed to load cream cans and their exposure to heat at Kandanga station was noted. The Railway Commissioner's inspection of the Mary Valley Railway in late 1924, noted the ongoing increase in "cream traffic" along the line and the arduous work involved for guards who were lifting the cans from platforms on rail level. The Commissioner agreed to cream sheds being provided at Amamoor and Dagun stations and Lagoon Pocket siding. The construction of the cream shed at Amamoor as well as a shed at Imbil was approved in February 1925 at a cost of £80 and £96 respectively. The following month the cream shed at the Lagoon Pocket siding was approved at a cost of £83. A shed at Dawn siding was built sometime after this date and a shed at Melawondi was built in 1946.

The provision of cream sheds along the length of the line demonstrated the extent and expansion of dairying in the Mary Valley. Cream supply was generally at its highest during the wetter summer months and this was when cream sheds were most heavily used. The lower output that occurred during winter is reflected in the returns for the week ending 24 August 1931, when 207 cream cans were forwarded to Gympie and 11 cans were sent to Pomona from Kandanga, Imbil, Amamoor and Dagun. The Mary River was subject to serious flooding during the wet season and the railway crossing near the Dawn often became impassable. The importance of cream freight was evident on these occasions, with a special train organised to pick up cans from the cream sheds until it reached the river crossing, from where the Wide Bay Co-op boat would ferry the supplies over the river.

The interwar period saw the dairy industry expand greatly in Queensland. Between 1927 and 1937 the total number of dairy cattle rose by 50 per cent. Dairying was geographically Queensland's most widespread agricultural industry in the 1930s and the state's second most profitable export industry from 1936 to 1941, accounting for 20 per cent of primary production. By the late 1930s, around one in eight Queenslanders were living on dairy farms.

The rapid increase in production in the Mary Valley during the interwar period made a significant contribution to the Gympie region's status as one of Queensland's top dairy producing areas. In response to increased cream supply outgrowing production capacity, the Wide Bay Co-Operative built what was claimed as Australia's largest butter factory in 1925, and was receiving cream from 2,000 suppliers by 1935. By 1927 the Gympie district was responsible for 10 per cent of Queensland's milk production, the majority of which was used for butter making. In 1937 the Petty Sessions District of Gympie was Queensland's largest milk and butter producer, with the greatest number of dairy cattle in milk. By 1939 the 12 butter factories in the Wide Bay-Burnett region (not including Cooroy), produced almost a third of Queensland's butter. In the same year, 4,500 cream cans were forwarded from Kandanga alone.

In 1952 the Gympie district produced 15 per cent of Queensland's butter, and 1953 was the Wide Bay Co-Operative's record year for payment to its suppliers. However, a downturn began in the 1950s, which reflected changes occurring across the industry in Queensland. Butter consumption per capita in Australia dropped from 12.2 kilograms (27 lb) to 8.3 kilograms (18 lb) between 1957 and 1972, and a major butter market was lost when Britain joined the European Economic Community in the early 1970s. The transition towards the production of milk rather than cream, requiring larger herds and new equipment, saw many smaller scale farmers leaving the industry or switching to beef cattle. Tougher regulations for the running of dairies, lower prices, foreign imports and competition from margarine producers all took their toll. Between 1973 and 1976, 28 per cent of the Wide Bay Co-op's farmers left the industry. As milk production increased, farm storage in vats and road transportation by tankers became the norm. The last delivery of dairy produce to Wide Bay Co-op's Gympie factory in a can (from Miva, west of Gympie) occurred in 1973 and the last butter was churned in May 1978, ending nearly 80 years of production at the site.

The decline of cream production and the realignment of transport arrangements for dairy producers saw the removal of some cream sheds on the Mary Valley railway, while those that remained were used for storage. The cream shed at Lagoon Pocket was removed in 1965 and at Dawn in 1968. In 1963 Dagun's cream shed was incorporated into the north corner of the goods sheds (erected 1938). At least one other example of a combined goods and cream shed is known to have been built in Queensland – at The Summit (near Stanthorpe).

While fruit freight (predominantly pineapples) continued to be transported on the Mary Valley railway following the demise of cream production, the line became increasingly unprofitable during the 1970s. By the late 1980s, the future of the line was increasingly precarious. In 1988 station masters/mistresses were removed from Imbil, Amamoor and Dagun and a number of railway buildings such as goods sheds, waiting sheds and residences were sold for removal. Queensland Railways opted to retain the cream sheds at Kandanga, Amamoor, Melawondi Dagun and Imbil (later removed) for storage purposes.

The reduction of infrastructure and services on the railway made it increasingly apparent that the line was to close. Strong protests by the district's pineapple growers helped to delay any final decision on the line's future. The last goods train ran to Kandanga in 1995 and thereafter pineapple growers took their produce to Traveston station on the Brisbane-Gympie North line. The line however, was not formally closed and in 1996 the Mary Valley Heritage Railway Board negotiated to conduct tourist train services on the line. The Mary Valley Heritage Railway commenced operations on the former Mary Valley branch on 23 May 1998. The "Valley Rattler" steam train tours and rail motor rides have since become a major tourist attraction for the region. A large group of volunteers and trainees contribute to the operation and maintenance of the line, rolling stock and buildings between the (former) Gympie Railway Station and Imbil. The cream sheds at Melawondi, Kandanga and Amamoor remain as evidence of the growth and economic importance of the dairy industry to the Mary Valley during the twentieth century.

== Description ==
=== Amamoor ===
The railway cream shed sits within the southern end of the Amamoor railway station yard, facing west adjacent to the Mary Valley branch railway line. The cream shed is a square timber structure, set on low timber stumps and sheltered by a gabled corrugated iron roof. The shed is timber framed and is clad and lined with horizontal hardwood boards separated by open spaces, with the interior boards offset to cover the outside spaces. Double timber doors open out to towards the timber platforms on either side of the shed. A set of low timber steps with a concrete block base lead up to the northern end of the platform facing the railway. A guard log is positioned in front of the northern elevation. The recent mural adorning the external timber boards of the shed is not of heritage significance.

=== Kandanga ===
The railway cream shed is located within the Kandanga railway yard. The building sits to the west of the station building, facing north adjacent to the Mary Valley branch railway line. The cream shed is a square timber structure, set on low timber stumps and sheltered by a gabled corrugated fibro roof. The shed is timber framed and is clad and lined with horizontal hardwood boards separated by open spaces, with the interior boards offset to cover the outside spaces. A number of (readily reversible) metal panels and shelves have been mounted internally for storage purposes. Double timber doors open out towards the timber platforms on either side of the shed. A set of low timber steps lead up to the eastern end of the platform facing the railway. The front platform extends to the west onto an earth loading bank retained with horizontal timber boards and vertical steel posts. The recent mural adorning the external timber boards of the shed is not of heritage significance.

=== Melawondi ===
The railway cream shed is located within the Melawondi railway yard facing east adjacent to the Mary Valley branch railway line, and is the only remaining structure within the yard. The cream shed is a square timber structure, set on low timber and concrete stumps and sheltered by a gabled corrugated iron roof. The shed is timber framed and is clad and lined with horizontal hardwood boards separated by open spaces, with the interior boards offset to cover the outside spaces. Double timber doors open out to towards the timber platforms on either side of the shed. The front platform is missing some timber boards.

== Heritage listing ==
Mary Valley Railway Cream Sheds was listed on the Queensland Heritage Register on 14 October 2011 having satisfied the following criteria.

The place is important in demonstrating the evolution or pattern of Queensland's history.

The Mary Valley railway cream sheds are important in demonstrating the growth of the dairy industry in the Wide Bay-Burnett, one of Queensland's most important dairy producing regions during the twentieth century. The construction of the branch railway (1911–1915) and the associated increase in closer settlement in the Mary Valley was a catalyst for the expansion of dairying in the district. The provision of cream sheds along the length of the line during the 1920s to 1940s demonstrates the extent of this expansion. More widely, the cream sheds illustrate the historical importance and role of railways in transporting dairy produce in Queensland.

The place is important in demonstrating the principal characteristics of a particular class of cultural places.

The highly intact Amamoor, Kandanga and Melawondi cream sheds demonstrate the principal characteristics of railway cream sheds built alongside Queensland railway lines to facilitate the transport of dairy produce during the twentieth century. Located adjacent to the railway line in station yards and built to a standard design, the small square sheds are clad and lined with horizontal hardwood boards separated by open spaces on both the interior and exterior, with those on the interior offset to cover the spaces on the exterior. The boards are spaced to improve air circulation, resulting in a cooler internal storage area. The sheds stand on low stumps, are sheltered by gabled roofs and have double doors that open out to platforms on either side of the shed for placement and retrieval of cream cans.
