= MVHR =

MVHR may refer to:

- Mechanical ventilation heat recovery, an energy recovery ventilation system working between two sources that have different temperatures
- Mary Valley Heritage Railway (now Mary Valley Rattler), conducting tours in Queensland, Australia
