= Queensland PB15 class locomotive =

Class of Australian 4-6-0 locomotives

Queensland Railways PB15 class
- 448 at Swanbank
Type and origin
- Power type: Steam
- Designer: Henry Horniblow & LW Piggott
- Builder: Evans, Anderson, Phelan & Co (70); North Ipswich Railway Workshops (1); Kitson & Co (20); Toowoomba Foundry (20); Walkers Limited (122)
- Build date: 1899-1926
- Total produced: 233
Specifications
- Configuration
  - Whyte: 4-6-0
- Gauge: 1,067 mm (3 ft 6 in)
- Leading dia.: 2 ft 2 in (660 mm)
- Driver dia.: 4 ft 0 in (1,219 mm)
- Length: 47 ft 6 in (14.48 m)
- Axle load: 8.1 tonnes (8.0 long tons; 8.9 short tons)
- Loco weight: 32 tonnes (31.5 long tons; 35.3 short tons)
- Tender weight: 24 tonnes (23.62096 long tons; 26.45547 short tons)
- Total weight: 56 tonnes (55.115566 long tons; 61.729433 short tons)
- Fuel type: Coal
- Fuel capacity: 4 tonnes (3.9 long tons; 4.4 short tons)
- Water cap.: 2,500 imperial gallons (11,000 L; 3,000 US gal)
- Firebox
  - Grate area: 12 sq ft (1.1 m^{2})
- Boiler pressure: 150 psi (1,034 kPa) later upgraded to 160 psi (1,103 kPa)
- Heating surface
  - Tubes and flues: 780 sq ft (72 m^{2})
- Cylinders: 2 outside
- Cylinder size: 15 in × 20 in (381 mm × 508 mm)
- Valve gear: Stephenson (locos built 1899–1912); Walschaerts (locos built 1924–26)
Performance figures
- Tractive effort: 12,750 lbf (56.71 kN)
Career
- Operators: Queensland Railways
- Numbers: 347-362, 385-394, 404-413, 434-509, 518-537, 540-609, 12, 5, 103, 126, 128, 143, 220, 286, 339, 340, 731-751
- Delivered: 1899
- First run: 22/12/1899
- Last run: 8/1970
- Retired: 8/1970
- Withdrawn: 8/1970
- Preserved: 444, 448, 454, 732, 738
- Current owner: Various Heritage Groups
- Disposition: 5 preserved, 228 scrapped

The Queensland Railways PB15 class locomotive is an old class of 4-6-0 steam engines operated by the Queensland Railways.

== History ==
The design resulted from a need for more powerful engines for passenger trains. The PB15 Class engine was designed by Locomotive Engineer, Henry Horniblow and LW Piggott. Per Queensland Railway's classification system they were designated the PB15 class engine, P representing they were a passenger locomotive, the B that they had three driving axles and the 15 the cylinder diameter in inches. The PB15 engines were in essence identical to the B15 class engine.

The first PB15 engines were delivered by Walkers Limited, Maryborough in December 1899. By 1912, a total of 202 engines had been built by Walkers (122), Evans, Anderson, Phelan & Co (70), Kitson & Co (20) and Toowoomba Foundry (20). They were fitted with Stephenson valve gear. In May 1918, engine no. 411 was converted at North Ipswich Railway Workshops into a tank engine, the one off member of the 6D15 class engine. In March 1922 however, due to poor performance it was converted back to its original tender form.

In 1924 one example of the engine was built by North Ipswich Railway Workshops for the Aramac Shire Tramway. It was acquired by Queensland Railways in 1958.

In 1925/26, Walkers manufactured a further 30 improved PB15 Class locomotives. These engines of these wheel arrangement were fitted with larger tenders and Walschaerts valve gear. This earned this variant of the PB15 engines the nickname Walschaerts.

In 1932, a number of PB15 class locomotives attached to Ipswich depot were fitted with a second sandbox for rear sanding to assist with shunting work on the colliery branches. These types of engines were nos. 351, 508, 567, 574, 587, 591, and 750, the last mentioned being a Walschaert engines or 1924 type PB15 engine. Later, the rear sanding equipment attached to classmate engine No. 591 was removed and PB15 engine No. 525 was fitted in lieu.

== Preservation ==
Five examples of these engines have been preserved:

- 444 is on display at the Workshops Rail Museum, Ipswich
- 448 is operational on the Queensland Pioneer Steam Railway, Swanbank and has been named in preservation RV Armstrong after the society's late founding member. It could be classmate engine No. 446, but this is wrong.
- 454 is undergoing a major overhaul at the Bellarine Railway, Queenscliff, Victoria
- 732 is in storage at the Workshops Rail Museum, one of the 1924 Walschaert type engines
- 738 is on display at the Rosewood Railway Museum, Rosewood, one of the 1924 Walschaert type engines

== In popular culture ==
- A virtual model of the PB15 is seen on the Trainz series.
