= Melawondi railway station =

Railway station in Queensland, Australia

Melawondi

General information
- Location: Melawondi, Queensland; Australia
- Coordinates: 26.411919°S 152.660485°E

Other information
- Status: Abandoned

Services
Preceding station	Queensland Rail	Following station
Former service
Imbil towards Dirranbandi	South Western railway	Kandanga towards Warwick
Location

Melawondi railway station is an abandoned railway station in Melawondi, Queensland, Australia. It was named in November 1912. The station received its name in November 1912 from a local Indigenous tribe. Construction of a loop siding was announced in September 1949.
