= Queensland A12 class locomotive =

Class of Australian 4-4-0 locomotives

Queensland Railways A12 class
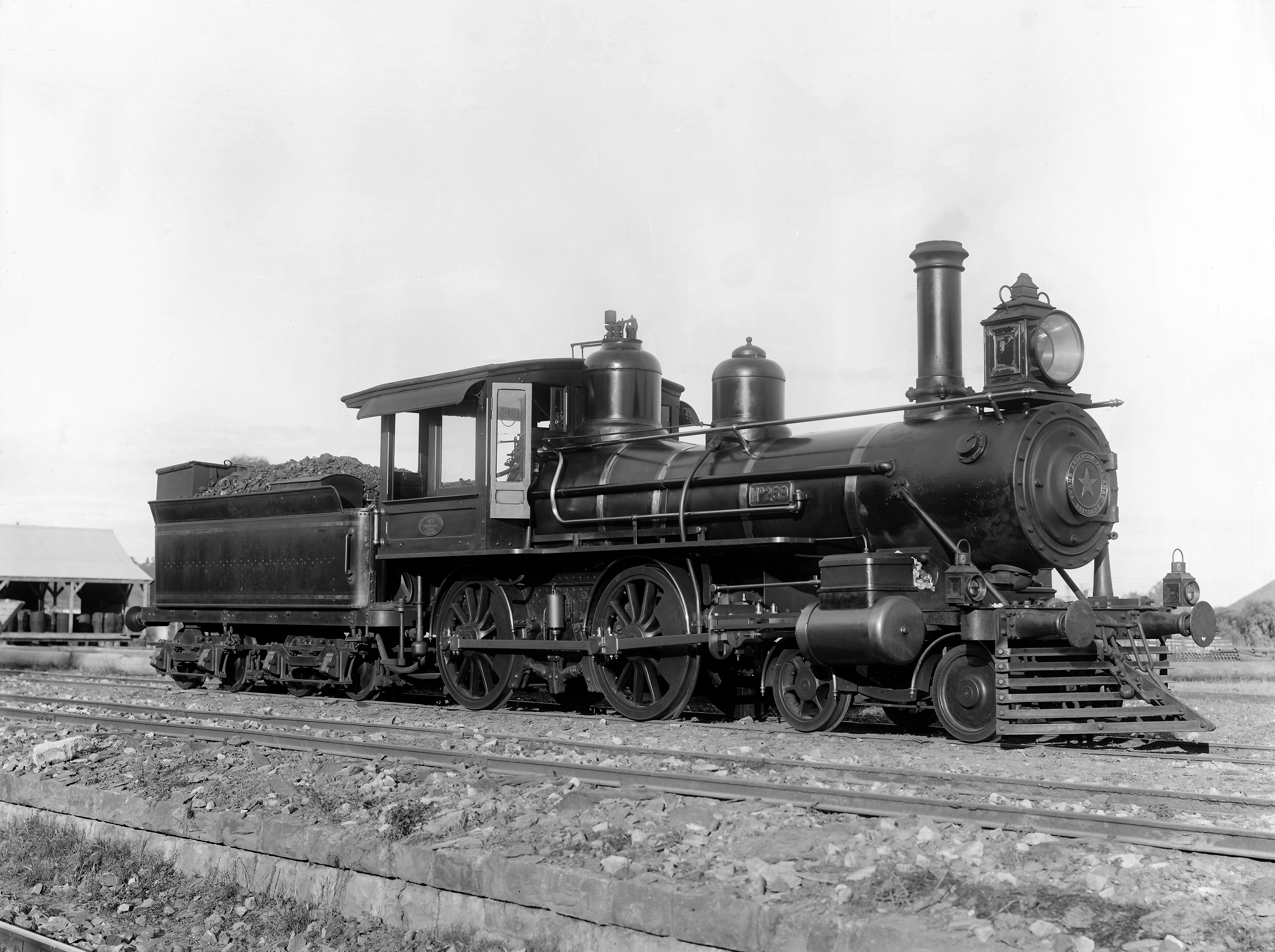
- A12 Class No.269
Type and origin
- Power type: Steam
- Builder: Baldwin Locomotive Works (18); Evans, Anderson, Phelan & Co (25)
- Build date: 1882-1891
- Total produced: 43
Specifications
- Configuration
  - Whyte: 4-4-0
- Gauge: 1,067 mm (3 ft 6 in)
- Fuel type: Coal
- Cylinders: 2 outside
- Cylinder size: 12 in × 18 in (305 mm × 457 mm)
Career
- Operators: Queensland Railways
- Numbers: 62-69, 95-99, 168-172, 245-269
- Disposition: All scrapped

The Queensland Railways A12 class locomotive was a class of 4-4-0 steam locomotives operated by the Queensland Railways.

== History ==
Between 1882 and 1895, the Queensland Railways took delivery of 43 4-4-0 locomotives built by Baldwin Locomotive Works (18) and Evans, Anderson, Phelan & Co (25). Per Queensland Railway's classification system they were designated the A12 class, A representing they had two driving axles, and the 12 the cylinder diameter in inches.

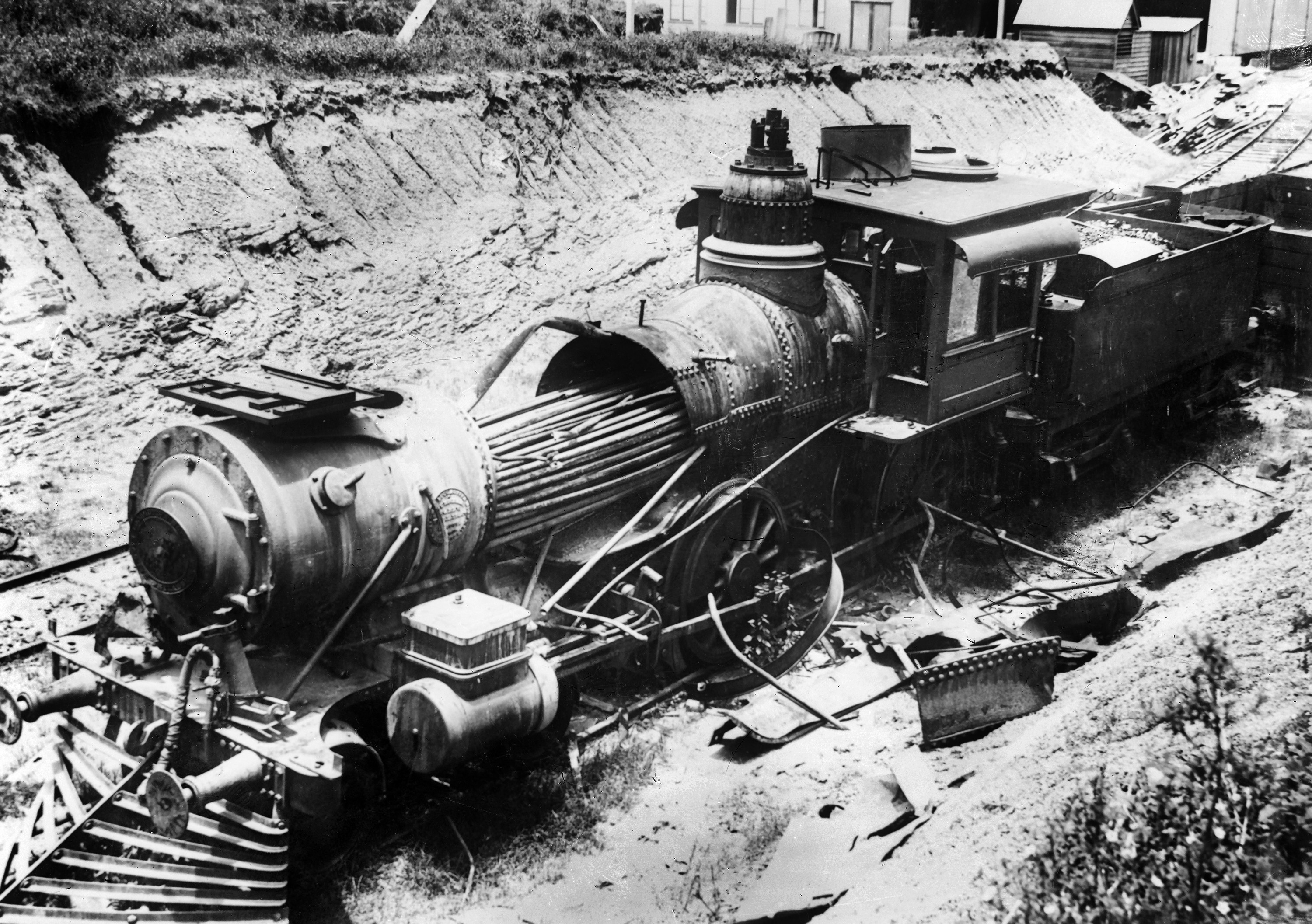
Wrecked A12 steam locomotive after its boiler exploded, Brisbane, 1898

An American built A12 class locomotive No.62 boiler exploded at Roma Street, Brisbane on 2 December 1898. The Court of Enquiry into the explosion was recorded in the 1899 Votes and Proceedings of the Queensland Legislative Assembly.

== See also ==
- List of boiler explosions
