= Defiance Flour Mill, Toowoomba =

Defiance Flour Mill
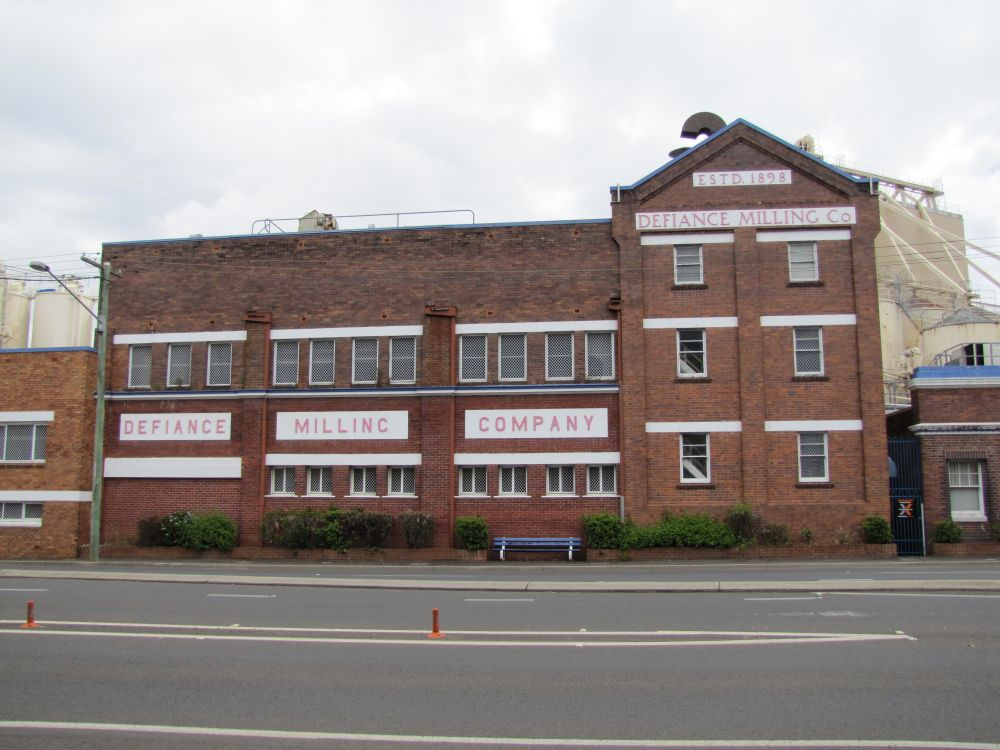
- Defiance Flour Mill, 2012

- Location within Queensland Location within Australia
- 27.5558°S 151.954°E
- Location: 269–291 Ruthven Street, Toowoomba, Toowoomba Region, Queensland, Australia

History
- Design period: 1870s–1890s (late 19th century)
- Built: 1911

Site notes
- Architect: William Hodgen

Queensland Heritage Register
- Official name: Defiance Flour Mill
- Type: state heritage (built)
- Designated: 26 February 2002
- Reference no.: 601306
- Significant period: 1911–1920s (fabric); 1899–ongoing (historical, social)
- Significant components: office/administration building, factory building, mill
- Builders: WT Smith

Defiance Flour Mill is a heritage-listed mill at 269–291 Ruthven Street, Toowoomba, Toowoomba Region, Queensland, Australia. It was designed by Toowoomba architect William Hodgen and built in 1911 by WT Smith. It was added to the Queensland Heritage Register on 26 February 2002.

== History ==
The Defiance Flour Mill is located in Ruthven Street on a prominent site adjacent to the Toowoomba Foundry and the Toowoomba Railway Station. The company was established in 1898 by Patrick O'Brien and his wife Ellen (née Fitzgerald), in partnership with George Crisp from Dominion Mill, and initially operated from premises in Russell Street prior to moving to the present site in Ruthven Street in 1899.

European discovery of the Darling Downs occurred in 1828 when Allan Cunningham provided a route through the Great Dividing Range which separated the Darling Downs from the Moreton Bay region. In 1840, Patrick Leslie became the first settler on the Downs, quickly followed by others and in 1842, a more accessible route through the Range was opened. Drayton evolved from a stopping place for those reaching the top of the Range, although by 1848 water shortages prompted moves to The Swamp, which was renamed Toowoomba in 1858. From the 1860s Toowoomba prospered as a regional centre with the establishment of many industries.

Patrick and Ellen O'Brien were both Irish migrants who were married at St Patrick's Cathedral in Toowoomba in 1884. They established a produce and grocery store in Russell Street, near the Dominion Flour Mill which was managed by George Crisp. Crisp, who had migrated to Queensland in 1887, was an experienced miller and had also worked in other mills on the Darling Downs.

By 1898, the O'Briens' produce store had developed into a successful business. They decided to finance a new flour mill in Toowoomba and entered into an equal partnership with Crisp, who became the manager and miller. At this stage, there were six other flour mills established on the Downs. Most of these were small operations using steam or water mills. In contrast, the Toowoomba Chronicle described the new Defiance Mill in Russell Street, which was designed by Toowoomba architects Marks & Sons as being "fitted with the latest machinery from England and America by the celebrated firm of Thos. Robinson & Son Ltd, Rockdale England, capable of turning out 16 tons of flour in 24 hours".

By November 1901, business had substantially increased and the Defiance Milling Company purchased the former Gisler's mill in Ruthven Street. Crisp maintained management of both mills, with one of the Gisler brothers remaining as miller-in-charge at the Ruthven Street mill. Further expansion occurred in 1902 when Defiance purchased another a mill in the Fortitude Valley, Brisbane.

In 1906, Patrick O’Brien died at the age of 63, leaving Ellen at 48 with 10 children between the ages of 4 and 22, a thriving milling business to run, as well as the grocery shop. Following Patrick O'Brien's death, his wife Ellen continued to manage the business. Although Patrick had accumulated an impressive estate which included city properties, the mills and the store, Ellen required funding assistance to purchase wheat for the following season's milling. Raising money became Ellen's responsibility from this stage on as "Crisp would have nothing to do with [such] 'humiliating' activities".

In 1911, a new milling building was erected on the Ruthven Street site. Designed by Toowoomba architect William Hodgen and built by WT Smith, it comprised a four storeyed brick building which was reportedly substantially damaged by fire less than two years later. The rebuilt building forms the core of the present site. New grain sheds equipped with handling machinery and a storage capacity of 28,000 bags were constructed to the north of the mill building in 1914.

Crisp's involvement in Defiance ended following the First World War when he sold his share to Ellen prior to retiring to Tasmania with his wife and daughter. The mill was then managed by Thomas Patrick, one of Ellen and Patrick's ten children. He was an experienced miller and upon discovering that the mill was in debt, set about producing the highest quality flour to become more competitive with other mills. Quality was a continuing passion, and Thomas often personally selected wheat directly from the farmers, even after the establishment of the Wheat Board in 1920.

In 1923, the Brisbane Valley mill was sold, and the Dalby Mill was acquired. The business continued to prosper and remained a family-owned business until 1955 when the Defiance Milling Company Pty Ltd was formed with Thomas Patrick as Governing Director, sister Ellen McCafferty and brother EF O'Brien as Directors, and brother PW O'Brien as Manager.

The 1960s saw much change and development in the flour milling business, largely due to the establishment of English-based company, George Weston Foods in Australia. This brought about greater competition for flour sales, and the development of pre-mixed products for bakeries. In the late 1960s, Defiance constructed a mill at Rockhampton to protect their North Queensland business from other millers who were developing into the region. The 1960s also saw the construction of the first of the silos which now dominate the Ruthven Street site.

Following the death of TP O'Brien in 1969, the Directors decided to consolidate the shareholdings of the company. In 1975, Defiance Holdings Pty Ltd was converted to an unlisted public company named Defiance Holdings Ltd, and the company was floated as a listed public company known as Defiance Mills Ltd in 1976. During this stage, the Ruthven Street site underwent a full remodelling.

Further expansion was made with the construction of a Melbourne mill to supply southern states, and by 1987 the fully owned mills at Toowoomba, Brisbane and Rockhampton, and the fifty percent owned Dalby mill were producing just over half of all the flour manufactured in Queensland, as well as soya bean and rye products.

The main building, originally constructed in 1911 continued to function as a flour mill until 2011, with most of the flour now used in other products produced by the mill such as pre-mixed cake and bread mixes. The remainder of the site comprises the pre-mix factory, the retail factory and the office. In 2011 a large flood damaged the site, and as of 2013 is no longer in use as a mill. The site has since been repurposed.

== Description ==
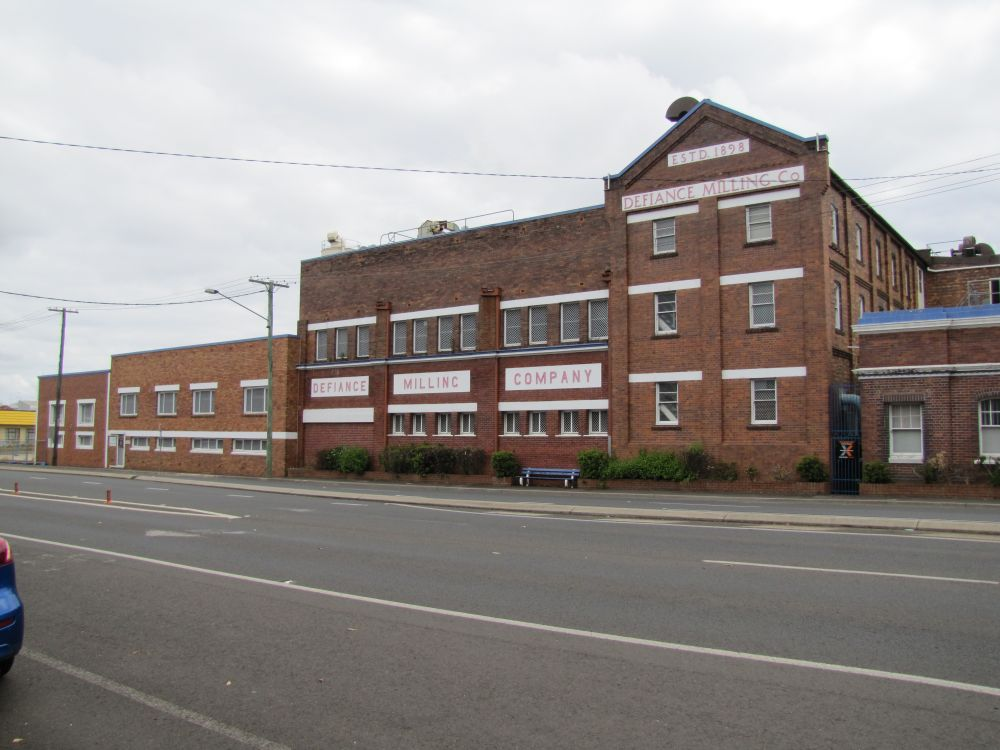
Flour mill, 2012

The Defiance Flour Mill site is bounded by Ruthven Street on the eastern side, the Toowoomba Foundry on the northern side, the Toowoomba Railway Station on the western side and a laneway on the southern side. The site forms an integral part of the industrial streetscape of the northern end of Ruthven Street and has landmark qualities from both the western and eastern sides.

The main entrance to the site is from Ruthven Street, with the 1911 mill building flanked by two face brick buildings on the northern side and three face brick buildings on the southern side.

The mill building is constructed of load bearing brick construction and the brick is laid in English bond. It is a three-storey gable roofed building, with the gable end addressing Ruthven Street. This elevation is divided into two bays with pilasters at each end and in the centre. Each storey has a pair of timber double hung windows with painted concrete lintels which run the width of each bay. The words Defiance Milling Co. and Est. 1898 are painted on the gable end.

The northern and southern elevations are also divided into bays by engaged pilasters. Timber framed double hung windows with shallow brick arches are located within each bay on each level. The roof is of corrugated iron with regularly spaced transparent fibreglass panels on either side. Five ventilators are located along the ridge. Internally, the mill building has undergone alterations to accommodate new equipment. It still functions as a flour mill over three levels, with an original set of stairs at the eastern end.

The buildings on either side of the mill are also of face brick, with timber framed windows and painted concrete lintels. Each building has a regular fenestration pattern, although they vary from building to building. The office building to the north of the mill has a more ornamented facade than the other buildings on the site with a simply moulded parapet and string course, and glazed bricks surrounding the windows. The windows of this, and the adjacent building also feature shallow brick arches above the windows. The rear of these buildings are sheeted with fibro and have corrugated iron roofs. Most internal areas in the office buildings have undergone major alterations, with little evidence of original fabric surviving.

To the south of the mill building are the retail and pre-mix factories. They are constructed of a combination of metal and timber frames, with corrugated iron cladding to the rear and side elevations and saw-tooth roofs.

Apart from a small landscaped area between the rear entrances of the offices and mill building, the site is sealed. Groups of large storage silos are located at either end of the site and more recent storage buildings are located at the rear of the site.

The northern end of the site contains timber framed corrugated iron clad building which originally formed part of the adjacent Toowoomba Foundry site.

== Heritage listing ==
Defiance Flour Mill was listed on the Queensland Heritage Register on 26 February 2002 having satisfied the following criteria.

- The place is important in demonstrating the evolution or pattern of Queensland's history.

Established in Toowoomba in 1898 the Defiance Flour Mill is important in demonstrating the evolution of Queensland's history as an example of an early and continually operating flour industry.

- The place is important in demonstrating the principal characteristics of a particular class of cultural places.

The Ruthven Street site has undergone expansion and development reflecting the evolution of flour milling technology. It demonstrates the principal characteristics of an operational industrial site which has evolved over about 90 years with an early central core. The main 1911 milling building demonstrates the principal characteristics of an early 20th century industrial building. The site is located adjacent to the Toowoomba Foundry and demonstrates the development of the northern end of Ruthven Street as an industrial precinct in close proximity to the Toowoomba Railway Station.

- The place is important because of its aesthetic significance.

The place has aesthetic significance and is a landmark, both from Ruthven Street and from the western side of the Toowoomba Railway Station. The 1911 mill building is of architectural significance as a well composed early industrial building.

- The place has a strong or special association with a particular community or cultural group for social, cultural or spiritual reasons.

Established over 100 years ago in Toowoomba, the Defiance Flour Mill has strong associations for past and present employees, and for the local community.

- The place has a special association with the life or work of a particular person, group or organisation of importance in Queensland's history.

The place is also readily identifiable with a renowned Queensland product, Defiance flour.

== Awards ==
In 2015, Ellen O'Brien and Defiance Flour were inducted into the Queensland Business Leaders Hall of Fame. Family owned and run for nearly a century and four generations, Defiance Flour became a business with national and international standing, underpinned by innovation, customer care and a loyal workforce.
