= Traveston Crossing Dam =

Traveston Crossing Dam (Proposed)
- Location within Queensland
- Location: 16km South of Gympie, Queensland
- Coordinates: 26.3354°S 152.709°E
- Type: reservoir
- Basin countries: Australia
- Water volume: 153,000 ML (5,400×10^{6} cu ft)

Traveston Crossing Dam was a proposed water project that was initiated by the state government of Queensland, Australia, in 2006 as a result of a prolonged drought which saw South-East Queensland's dam catchment area receive record-low rain. The project was cancelled in November 2009, after being refused approval by federal Environment Minister Peter Garrett.

== Planning ==
The dam was proposed to stretch from the Traveston Crossing Bridge near Amamoor, 160 kilometres (99 miles) north of Brisbane, south and affect the areas surrounding Bergins Pocket and Kandanga. The dam would have affected major transport arteries through the area, including the North Coast Railway Line and the Bruce Highway.

The planned damming of the Mary River was not a popular idea with local residents who would have been directly affected by its construction, nor for the wider national and international community concerned about the impact on the many endangered and vulnerable species living in the river. There was strong opposition to the dam from the wider and international community based on environmental concerns related to the endangered Mary River cod, Mary River turtle, giant barred frog, Cascade tree frog, Coxen's fig parrot, the vulnerable Queensland lungfish, tusked frog, honey blue-eye fish, the Richmond birdwing butterfly and the Illidge's ant blue butterfly. There were also fears for the dugong, a globally vulnerable species. It was alleged that reduced fresh water flows to the Great Sandy Strait would have affected the growth of seagrass, the Dugong's primary food source.

The Mary River turtle and the Queensland lungfish attracted particular attention regarding their conservation. The turtle, whose only known home is the Mary River, is a cloacal ventilator ('bum breather' - it uses oxygen from water taken in through its tail), and is listed in the top 25 most endangered turtle species in the world. The Lungfish also has great significance to evolutionary biologists. It requires the rapids in order to breed, and much of its breeding habitat had already been interrupted by other dams in Queensland. Professor Jean Joss of Macquarie University stated, in a submission to the Senate Inquiry 2007: "The Mary River dam would almost certainly push the lungfish to 'Critically Endangered,' and in the long term will lead to its extinction in the wild." The Mary River Cod, which only lives naturally in the Mary River system, is already Critically Endangered. It is completely protected, and it is illegal to fish them.

Some believed that it was necessary to create more jobs in the area and to enhance South East Queensland's water security; however many others in the Gympie business community believed they would have their jobs destroyed, with many industries badly affected, particularly industries such as dairy farming. People in the farming industries in the area, who would have lost their farms with the construction of the dam, considered the area to be amongst the best food-producing land in Australia. Fishermen in the Tin Can Bay area relying on flows into the Great Sandy Straight were also concerned about the environmental impact of reduced flows to their area on the sustainability of their region and industry. Farmers downstream from the dam believed the dam would have had a devastating economic impact. Chairman of the Greater Mary Association, Darryl Stewart, stated: "Estimated annual economic downturn in the downstream communities could be around A$500 million, especially affecting agriculture, fishing and tourism. And there would be serious social consequences. The downstream effects of this proposed dam will be far worse than the effects in the dam footprint."

The Mary River flows into the Great Sandy Strait, near wetlands of international significance recognised by the International agreement of the Ramsar Convention and Fraser Island World Heritage Area, which attracts thousands of visitors every year.

== Construction delays ==
Other than road building, dam construction did not go ahead while Commonwealth approval was pending. Construction of the dam was delayed by four years. In 2007, the Federal Government of Australia held a Senate Inquiry on the issue. In November 2008 the Federal Senate passed a non-binding motion seeking to permanently stop the dam's construction.

== Opposition to the dam ==
The proposed dam aroused opposition from many groups and organisations, from local farmers and fisherman to environmentalists and politicians (both nationally and internationally).

Fraser Island Defenders Organisation, John Sinclair, stated, "The dramatic reduction and almost total blockage of environmental flow into this most significant estuary will heavily impact on these very sensitive aspects of marine ecology."

The Australian Conservation Foundation campaigned for the protection of species such as the Mary River Turtle, the Queensland Lungfish and the Mary River Cod.

The Gubbi Gubbi Aboriginal people, whose land would have been affected by the dam, were offered an agreement by the Queensland government worth more than $1 million, which the Gubbi Gubbi people flatly refused. Regarding the Mary River Dam Dr Eve Fesl stated, "We said we would have nothing to do with it. We’re not going to sign away our history, our culture, the Mary Valley. No way," and, "They couldn’t give a damn about the Mary River. They saw the dollar signs and they wet their pants," she said. She also stated, "Our whole history and culture will be washed out if that dam is built. But not only that, a number of threatened species could be wiped out.”

Greens Senator Bob Brown said, "the dam should be opposed because it would flood thousands of hectares of prime food-producing land near Brisbane, Aboriginal heritage sites and the main nursery for the world famous Australian Lungfish. I've told the minister there is no way he should allow the major breeding ground for the Queensland Lungfish or the Mary River Turtle, or Mary River Cod, to be obliterated." "If the rest of Australia knew what damage was being proposed on the Mary River, they would stand up and stop this dreadful dam!"

Sunshine Coast Government MPs and environmentalists "called on the State Government to scrap the Traveston Dam after it yesterday revealed plans for desalination plants at Marcoola, Kawana and Bribie Island." Sunshine Coast Regional Council Mayor Bob Abbot "told thedaily.com.au the announcement confirmed what the Mary River council of mayors had been saying more than a year ago - that the Traveston Dam should be scrapped - and that alternatives such as desalination properly explored." Fiona Simpson stated, "this strategy and the Water Commissioner’s comments left no doubt that the Traveston Dam was a political decision and desalination was a better and more reliable option."

A University of Technology, Sydney report stated that "the proposed Traveston Dam near Gympie could pump up to 400,000 tonnes of greenhouse emissions into the atmosphere each year" and “even desalination, itself a last resort in a severe drought, would result in fewer emissions at 280,000 to 350,000 (annual tonnes) to yield the same quantity of water".

According to the Australian Conservation Foundation, "Eighty five per cent of Brisbane residents agree 'the Queensland Government should consider alternatives to building Traveston Dam' according to a poll released by the Australian Conservation Foundation".

The independent expert Associate Professor Keith Walker says that the mitigation and offset strategies such as the Freshwater Species Conservation Centre were inadequate, risky and ill-defined and that the proposed fish and turtle ladders were unproven.

"Don't Murray the Mary" Environmental campaigner Steve Posselt, who protested the dam by kayaking 861 kilometres (535 miles) to raise awareness of the environmental impact of damming the Mary River, stated that "Traveston Crossing Dam will be less than 2m deep over a great percentage of its area. Evaporation is somewhere between 1.5 to 2 metres (4 ft 11 in to 6 ft 7 in) per annum. Wivenhoe Dam is not a deep dam and suffers similarly from significant greenhouse gas generation. The longer the water level is low between fills, the more vegetation regeneration occurs. There is no escaping the fact that on an average annual basis large volumes of methane are produced when this vegetation rots. Methane is more than twenty times more powerful as a greenhouse gas than CO2(Carbon dioxide)."

The Great Sandy Strait depends on the Mary River to sustain its complex ecosystem. Fraser Island is the largest sand island in the world and is also of huge significance to Aboriginal Australian history. The Great Sandy Strait lies between the western fringes of World Heritage Listed Fraser Island and the south-east Queensland coast. Most of its eastern side is within the World Heritage Area and its beauty and unique ecology attract thousands of tourists annually. It is listed under the Ramsar Convention as a Wetland of International Significance and is also one of Australia’s most important nesting sites for migratory trans-equatorial shorebirds.

== Cancellation ==
Construction of the dam was cancelled on 2 December 2009 by Peter Garrett the Minister for the Environment, Heritage and the Arts under the Environment Protection and Biodiversity Conservation Act 1999 on the grounds of "Listed Threatened species and communities".

== See also ==
- List of dams and reservoirs in Australia
