= Mary Valley Rattler =

Heritage railway in Australia

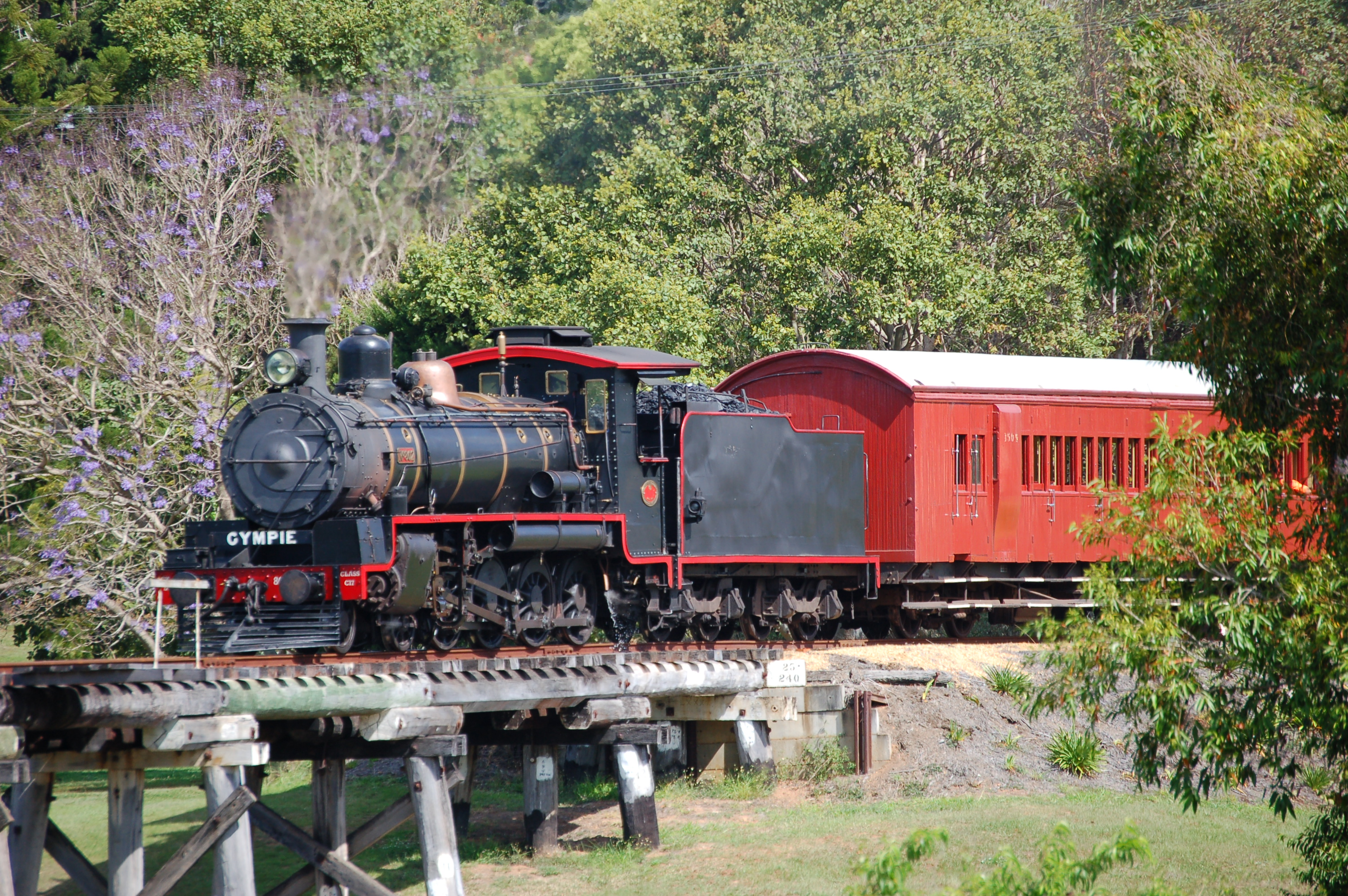
The Valley Rattler, C17 802

The Mary Valley Rattler (formerly Mary Valley Heritage Railway) is a heritage railway line that conducts steam train trips and tours from Gympie through the Mary Valley using the former Mary Valley railway line in the Gympie Region, Queensland, Australia. It is now one of the region's biggest tourist attractions and is managed by a not-for-profit organisation. It has been described as Australia's third biggest heritage railway. It was shut down for safety reasons in 2012. In 2016, the Gympie Regional Council provided funding to make the railway operational again as it is a major tourist attraction for the area. Journeys recommenced between Gympie and Amamoor on 6 October 2018.

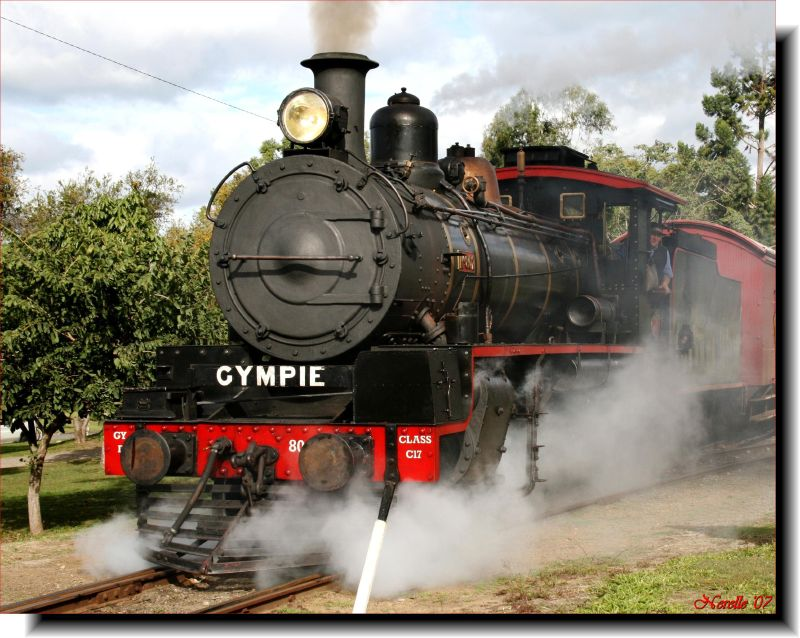
The Rattler in motion

== Railway history ==
The Mary Valley railway line was a branch line of the North Coast railway line, which branched west at Monkland (just south of Gympie) and continued to Brooloo in the upper Mary Valley. It was constructed between 1911 and April 1915 to facilitate closer settlement of the Mary River valley. The line reached Kandanga railway station in February 1914 and the terminus of Brooloo in April 1915. In March 1920, an extension of 10 miles 20 chains (16.5 km) to Kenilworth was approved at an estimated cost of £175,000. However, the extension was never constructed.

By the 1970s, the line became increasingly unprofitable due to the economic impact on the dairying industry of lower butter consumption due to competition of margarine and the loss of the British export market when the UK entered the European Economic Community. The Wide Bay Co-Operative Butter Factory in Gympie (Australia's largest butter factory in 1925) closed in May 1978 after nearly 80 years of operation. In 1988, staff were withdrawn from Imbil, Amamoor and Dagun stations, with some railway buildings such as goods sheds and residences sold for removal. The pineapple industry lobbied successfully to keep the line operational until 1995. The Mary Valley Heritage Railway Board proposed to operate a tourist train on the line in 1996 using volunteers and trainees. The tourist train service commenced on 23 May 1998.

In 2010, the Department of Employment, Economic Development and Innovation conducted a review of the operations of the railway. It found the railway was operating at a significant economic loss and was dependent on grant income. In 2011, concerns were raised about the safety of the line, but government inspectors found no significant safety issues. When 2010–11 Queensland floods closed roads in the area, the railway was used as a shuttle service. Some of the line crossings had a five km/h speed limit with the top speed limited to 25 km/h.

After two very serious derailments during August and September 2012, the limitations and state of the railway company's finances became known. It was shut down indefinitely by the Department Transport & Main Roads, as it was declared unsafe to convey passengers. Following flood damage in 2013, the railway disbanded. In June 2016, the Gympie Regional Council allocated $250,000 for operational start-up costs and $3.8 million for capital funds to restart the Rattler.

== Tours & Timetables ==
=== Mary Valley Heritage Railway (1993–2013) ===
"Ride The Rattler" scenic tours were operated by the Mary Valley Heritage Railway (MVHR) every Saturday, Sunday and Wednesday from the historic Gympie Railway Station. This historic 40 km (25 mi) journey commences at Gympie, and after crossing the Mary River, negotiates an abundance of curves, gradients and bridges to pass through the small country villages of Dagun, Amamoor and Kandanga to Imbil.

The steam train, pulled by a fully restored C17 class locomotive from the early 1920s, departed Gympie station at 10 am. The Gympie Station itself dates back to pre-1880. As the train travels south, it passes through the southern end of the city of Gympie.

After crossing the Mary River, the railway line enters the Mary Valley. The line wanders away from the river to negotiate the valleys of some of its main tributaries, including the Yabba, Kandanga and Amamoor Creeks. In this area, there are a number of curves, gradients and bridges as the train heads towards the station of Kandanga.

The country village of Kandanga was established in 1910 to service patrons travelling on the proposed Mary Valley line which became operational as far as Kandanga in 1914. The original Kandanga railway station, now restored to its former glory, contains an interesting pictorial record of the history of the Mary Valley line.

Travelling through to Imbil, the line traverses an interesting gorge section through mainly timbered country, before reaching a short tunnel that pierces a ridge of coastal ranges. The track then descends quickly to the line's largest town, Imbil. The Imbil Railway Bridge over Yabba Creek was constructed between 1911 and 1915.

=== Mary Valley Rattler (2018–present) ===
As of March 2021, heritage journeys operated by a C17 steam locomotive run on Wednesdays, Saturdays and Sundays, departing from Gympie Railway Station, travelling to Dagun and Amamoor. On Thursdays, a railmotor dining and tasting tour is operated by RM76.

The railway also runs various events throughout the year.

== Fleet ==
=== Steam Locomotives ===
Number	Image	Year built	Builder	Status	Notes	Colours
C17 45		1923	Evans Anderson Phelan, Brisbane.	Stored	Operational from 1996 until May 2003, now stored at Gympie.	QR Black and Red
C17 253		1921	Evans Anderson Phelan, Brisbane.	Undergoing Overhaul	Formerly at Mundubbera, traded for 965 in 2003.	*dismantled*
C17 705		1926	Evans Anderson Phelan, Brisbane.	Stored	Formerly displayed at a preschool in Spring Hill until 705 was purchased in 2009.	Apple Green and Red
C17 819		1927	Armstrong Whitworth, Newcastle upon Tyne.	Undergoing Overhaul	Formerly displayed at Cloncurry until purchased in the 1990s as a second locomotive for MVHR.	*dismantled*
C17 967		1950	Walkers Limited, Maryborough.	Operational	Currently the only operational locomotive at Mary Valley Heritage Railway after C17 802 was withdrawn in ~2011 or 2012. Was originally plinthed in a park at Caloundra. 967 was purchased in 1985 by the Ghan Preservation Society, Alice Springs, Northern Territory and exhibited as 'gatekeeper' at their site. Initial inspection work identified it was suitable for operation. In 2000 No. 967 was purchased by Beaudesert Rail and moved to Beaudesert, south of Brisbane, restored to operation in early 2003 and used on Beaudesert - Logan tourist trains.	QR Black and Red
C17 996		1953	Walkers Limited, Maryborough.	Stored/Spare parts	This locomotive was formerly plinthed at Southport. This locomotive was purchased in 2005 by QPSR, who started overhaul but didn't finish the overhaul. 996 has since been purchased by Mary Valley Rattler for spare parts of C17 967.	*dismantled*

==== Historical steam locomotive fleet ====
Number	Image	Year built	Builder	Status (when put up for sale)	Notes	Colours (when put up for sale)
C17 802		1927	Armstrong Whitworth, Newcastle upon Tyne.	Stored	Operational from 2003 until approximately 2011 or 2012. A suburban D17 whistle and B18 1/4 tender were used on the locomotive when it was restored. In June 2019, the locomotive was purchased by Southern Downs Steam Railway for use as their second locomotive in the near future.	QR Black and Red
C17 965		1950	Walkers Limited, Maryborough.	Undergoing restoration	At an unknown date, the carriage was purchased by MVHR and was put under restoration. 965 was previously displayed at a rotary park in Gladstone and was painted in a mostly yellow colour scheme. 965 was swapped with locomotive 253 in 2003 and is now displayed at Mundubbera.	QR Black and Red

=== Diesel locomotives ===
Number	Image	Year built	Builder	Status	Notes	Colours
1632		1967	English Electric, Rocklea.	Operational	Locomotive 1632 was purchased in 1996. When it was restored, 1632 serves as a shunting locomotive in the Gympie Yard and as a replacement locomotive when fire bans are put in place.	MVHR Blue and White.
1639		1967	English Electric, Rocklea.	Stored		QR Blue and White.
1649		1969	English Electric, Rocklea.	Stored/spare parts		QR Blue and White.

== Heritage Listings ==
The Mary Valley Rattler has a number of heritage-listed sites, including:

- Kandanga; Amamoor; Melawondi Stations; Mary Valley Branch Railway: Mary Valley Railway Cream Sheds
- Over Yabba Creek: Imbil Railway Bridge

== See also ==
- Rail transport in Queensland
