= Toowoomba Foundry =

Toowoomba Foundry Pty Ltd
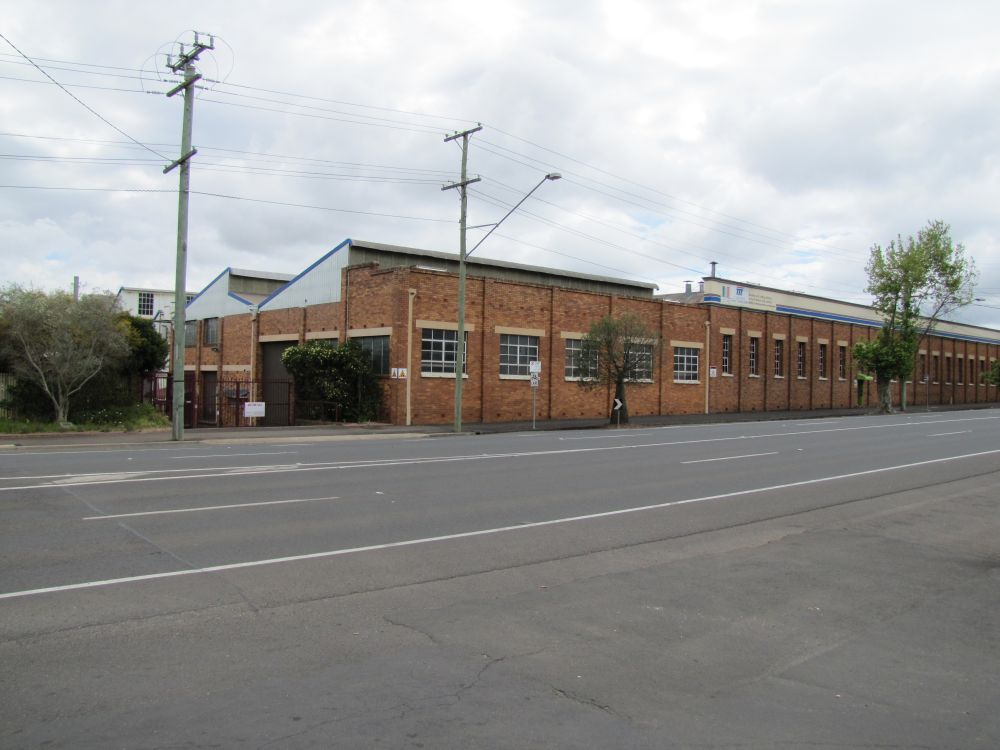
- Toowoomba Foundry, 2012

- Location within Queensland Location within Australia
- 27.5536°S 151.9537°E
- Location: 251–267 Ruthven Street, Toowoomba, Queensland, Australia

History
- Design period: 1870s–1890s (late 19th century)
- Built: c. 1910–1940s

Queensland Heritage Register
- Official name: Toowoomba Foundry Pty Ltd, Griffiths Brothers and Company, Southern Cross Works, Toowoomba Foundry and Railway Rolling Stock Manufacturing Company
- Type: state heritage (built)
- Designated: 7 July 2004
- Reference no.: 601300
- Significant period: c. 1910–1940s (fabric); 1876–1987 (historical)
- Significant components: railway, machinery/plant/equipment – manufacturing/processing, canteen, workshop, trees/plantings, office/administration building

Toowoomba Foundry Pty Ltd is a heritage-listed former foundry at 251–267 Ruthven Street, Toowoomba, Queensland, Australia. It was built from c. 1910 to 1940s. It is also known as Griffiths Brothers & Company, Southern Cross Works, and Toowoomba Foundry and Railway Rolling Stock Manufacturing Company. It was added to the Queensland Heritage Register on 7 July 2004. The northern and western portions of the site have undergone redevelopment as a Bunnings Warehouse outlet, having obtained Toowoomba Regional Council approval to demolish some of the heritage-listed structures on the site. Construction commenced in late 2016, with the store opening in late 2017.

== History ==
The Toowoomba Foundry is located in Ruthven Street on a prominent site adjacent to the Defiance Flour Mill and the Toowoomba railway station. It was established in 1871 by George Washington Griffiths and continually operated as a foundry until 2012.

Owned by Griffiths family descendants until 1987 when it was purchased by National Consolidated, the foundry is one of the last surviving 19th century industries on the Darling Downs. Among other products, it produced rolling stock for Queensland Railways, and the Southern Cross windmill, one of the most enduring icons on the Darling Downs.

The present site of Toowoomba was initially known as the Swamp and during the 1840s was secondary to the principal Darling Downs township of Drayton.

European discovery of the Darling Downs occurred in 1828 when Alan Cunningham provided a route through the Great Dividing Range which separated the Darling Downs from the Moreton Bay region. In 1840, Patrick Leslie became the first settler on the Darling Downs, quickly followed by others and in 1842, a more accessible route through the Range was opened. Drayton evolved from a stopping place for those reaching the top of the Range, although by 1848 water shortages prompted moves to The Swamp, which was renamed Toowoomba in 1858.

George Washington Griffiths of Bristol, England arrived in Australia in 1870 with his wife, daughter and two sons. After attending a lecture given by J C White of Jondaryan, Griffiths decided to settle in Toowoomba where he gained work as a builder.

The following year, Griffith's father sent out a consignment of ironmongery, enabling him to establish a shop and repair foundry in Ruthven Street, with his brother-in-law William Atherton. In 1873, Atherton left the partnership and Griffiths was joined by his brother John who was "an engineer with several scholarships and degrees." By November of the same year, the Toowoomba Chronicle reported that the "little machine shop of Griffiths Bros. & Co" was being enlarged.

In September 1874, Griffiths sold the ironmongery business to Holberton and Company and purchased 2 acres of land on the corner of Campbell and Ruthven Streets with the intention of concentrating solely on the engineering aspects of the business. The new foundry, named Griffiths Brothers and Company, opened in February 1876 and was described in the Toowoomba Chronicle as comprising an office, storeroom and four workshops containing the sawing department, the fitting and machine shop, the casting workshop (where the first casting in iron on the Darling Downs was recorded), and the blacksmiths and boilermakers section.

In the same year, John Griffiths left the business to become Assistant Engineer in the Construction Branch of the Queensland Railway Department, although he maintained a financial interest in the foundry.

The foundry struggled during its early years, with Griffiths receiving funding from his father to cover debts. However, by 1881 the business had improved and the foundry was "making steam engines and boilers, wool and other presses, washpool requirements, spouting and soap tanks, pumps, windmills, troughing, castings - iron or brass, ironwork for verandahs, and also contracting to provide railway stock for the Queensland Government Railways." The construction of windmills, which were later to keep the company afloat during difficult times also commenced.

In 1883, Griffiths bought out his partners (sisters, Harriott and Lilly, brother John and brother-in-law K L Marshland) to form a public company which was floated on 4 July 1884. The new company was known as the Toowoomba Foundry and Railway Rolling Stock Manufacturing Company Ltd, with Griffiths as managing director, and many notable citizens as provisional directors, including Augustus Charles Gregory, William Henry Groom and James Campbell. Despite the formation of a public company, the Griffiths family purchased sufficient shares to ensure the foundry remained under their control.

By 1886, the foundry employed 72 men and comprised a showroom (60 by 33 feet (18 by 10 m)) for imported goods; a foundry shop containing a central furnace, a dozen forges, steam hammers, a rolling machine and an iron cutting machine; a moulding shop; and a brass foundry. The production of windmills, which were described as "the pride and glory of the place," also continued.

The foundry continued to prosper until the early 1890s, when business began to decline due to the economic depression of the period. Despite this, the Toowoomba Foundry was able to purchase the trade, plant and goodwill of its rival, the Reliance Foundry, which had been established in 1882 by Mr Porritt, former employee of Griffiths Brothers and Company. The survival of the foundry during this period is attributed to "the manufacture of cheap wood and steel Simplex windmills which were necessary on the Darling Downs to raise water from the sub-artesian reservoirs" and were 'sold in their hundreds to farmers all over the Darling Downs.

Trade increased in the late 1890s due to new rolling stock contracts. Due to the construction of new lines between 1906 and 1908, Queensland Railways found it necessary to let external contracts to private firms to build the required additional engines. Between 1909 and 1910, ninety engines were ordered from private firms including the Toowoomba Foundry, and between 1912 and 1913, the Foundry constructed an additional twenty locomotives of the light PB15 class for Queensland Railways. A further fifteen C16 class locomotives were ordered from the Foundry during 1914–15, one of which survives as part of the Queensland Rail Museum collection at Redbank.

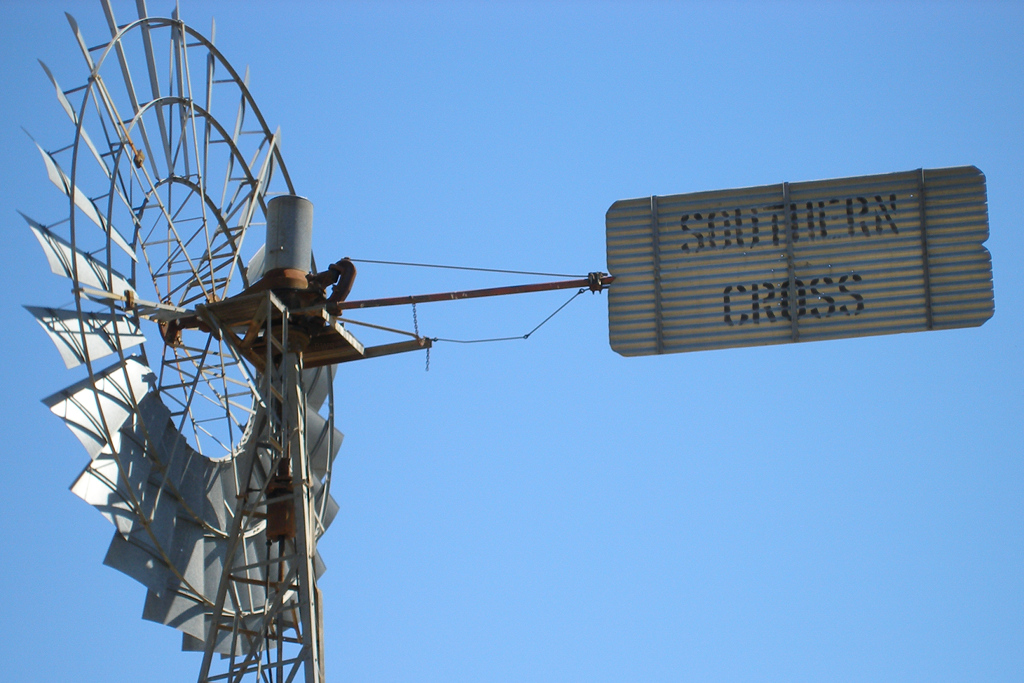
Southern Cross windmill on the Barkly Highway

In 1903, the Southern Cross windmill was designed by John Alfred Griffiths in conjunction with by George Griffiths's son, Bert. This saw the beginning of a prosperous period due to specialisation in the windmill and water supply business, and the subsequent use of the name Southern Cross as the Foundry's trade name. In August 1924, G W Griffiths died. His sons, Alfred and George continued the management of the business, which expanded to encompass sales divisions in the Middle East and South Africa. The onset of the Second World War saw further expansion of the Foundry, with over 1000 people employed and the production of engines, generating sets and pumping units under contract to the Australian Government and the Armed Services of Britain and the United States.

Despite a shortage of supplies following the War, the company continued to grow, ensuring viable batch quantities were maintained by establishing the trade name through its many overseas outlets. This proved so successful that an export division was established in 1945, and additional sales offices were established in Charleville, Townsville, Rockhampton, Sydney, Melbourne, Perth, Tamworth, Moree, Lismore and South Africa.

The Griffiths family maintained ownership of the company until 1987 when it was purchased by National Consolidated. Due to operational changes, the foundry site has decreased in size in recent years. The buildings at the southern end of the site, which were formerly used to assemble and package windmills, were sold to Defiance Flour Mill (who operated from the adjacent site) in 1993. The buildings at the northern end of the site are owned by Southern Cross, who now operate as a separate entity.

In 2002, Southern Cross Windmills relocated to a facility near Toowoomba, after being purchased by Tyco Flow Control Pacific in late 1999.

Most of the buildings on the site appear to date from the late nineteenth/early twentieth century and have been altered and extended during the two major periods of expansion in 1923 and the 1940s. More recent additions and alterations are also evident.

The site continued to operate as a foundry and machine shop into the twenty-first century. It was purchased by Austrim in 1998, and was being operated by Toowoomba Metal Technologies, a subsidiary of CMI Industrial, at the time of its closure in mid-2012.

The site was disused following its closure, and was purchased by Bunnings Warehouse in October 2013 with a view to building their second Toowoomba store. They released plans in February 2014, involving demolition of a substantial portion of the site while incorporating other buildings into the development.

In July 2015, Toowoomba Regional Council approved the demolition of the moulding shop, the core shop, Brooks Shed and post-1960 additions, and partial demolition of the cylinder head building, maintenance building and machine shop. The demolition of the mostly state heritage-listed buildings was locally controversial. Bunnings claimed that the "high value state heritage places being the cylinder head building, maintenance building and the old canteen building" would be retained in the new development. In May 2016, Bunnings announced that a successful tenderer for the project had been selected and that construction would begin later in 2016.

== Description ==
The Toowoomba Foundry site is bounded by Ruthven Street on the eastern side, the Defiance Flour Mill on the southern side, the Toowoomba Railway Station on the western side and the Southern Cross site on the northern side. The site forms an integral part of the industrial streetscape of the northern end of Ruthven Street and has landmark qualities from both the western and eastern sides. A combination of mature trees and recent landscaping is planted in front of the Ruthven Street elevation.

The main entrance is from Ruthven Street, along which runs a face brick single storey building. The main section of this building is divided by engaged pilasters into twenty two bays. Each bay contains a fifteen paned window with painted concrete sills and lintels, apart from the seventh bay from the southern end, in which a door is located. This section is surmounted by a concrete rendered parapet which is painted with the Toowoomba Foundry logo and colours.

An additional section at the southern end of the building is constructed of similar face bricks and also divided by engaged pilasters into bays containing windows with painted concrete sills and lintels, although the bays and windows are wider than in the original section.

At the northern end of the site, the building steps back to form a "U" shape surrounding a carpark, continuing the pattern of bays divided by engaged pilasters.

Internally, these buildings comprise a reception area, office and canteen space on split levels. Most areas have undergone major alterations, with little evidence of original fabric surviving.

The remainder of the site comprises machine, moulding and core workshops, which are steel framed and clad in corrugated iron, apart from the southern end of the machine shop, which is clad in corrugated iron, but has a timber frame. Other buildings on the site are of a smaller scale, and are a combination of timber and steel framed buildings clad with corrugated iron. Some contain remnants of now obsolete industrial equipment, such as cranes.

The areas between the buildings are recently sealed, with remnants of railways tracks in the south-western corner of the site.

== Heritage listing ==
Toowoomba Foundry Pty Ltd was listed on the Queensland Heritage Register on 7 July 2004 having satisfied the following criteria.

The place is important in demonstrating the evolution or pattern of Queensland's history.

The Toowoomba Foundry was established in 1871 and commenced operations at its present site in 1876, and has remained in operation since that time. It is important in demonstrating the evolution and pattern of Queensland's history in particular:

- it is important in demonstrating the role of secondary industry, particularly in the provincial cities, within the State's economic and social fabric;
- the industrial precinct located in close proximity to the Toowoomba Railway Station (of which the Toowoomba Foundry and adjoining Defiance Mill are an integral part) is important in demonstrating the importance of the relationship between the provision of railway infrastructure and the development of Queensland secondary industry in the 19th century, particularly in the provincial cities.

The place demonstrates rare, uncommon or endangered aspects of Queensland's cultural heritage.

The Toowoomba Foundry is an uncommon example of an industrial site in Queensland which has had a continued use for nearly 130 years, and which remained in the same family for over 110 years.

The place is important in demonstrating the principal characteristics of a particular class of cultural places.

The Toowoomba Foundry has been in continual operation for nearly 130 years on this site and is important in demonstrating the principal characteristics of an operational industrial site, which has evolved over time, and continues to do so. The site has undergone expansion and development according to fluctuations in demand for its various products, including rolling stock for Queensland Government Railways; windmills; and engines during the Second World War. The evolutionary nature of the site is evident in the location of the site as well as in the range of age, type, style and arrangement of buildings on the site.

The place is important because of its aesthetic significance.

The place has aesthetic significance as part of the industrial streetscape along the northern end of Ruthven Street as well as being prominent in the wider industrial landscape, especially when viewed from the Toowoomba Railway Station. Its landmark qualities from the west are due to the massing of a number of industrial, corrugated iron clad buildings. The site presents a more formal face to Ruthven Street through the brick fronted office building and canteen.

The place has a strong or special association with a particular community or cultural group for social, cultural or spiritual reasons.

Established nearly 130 years ago, the Toowoomba Foundry, with its long history as a major employer in Toowoomba, has strong associations for past and present employees, and for the local community. The canteen erected during the Second World War is of particular significance, and company social occasions were also held here. The place also has a strong association with rural Australia as a well-known producer and supplier of windmills, which have become synonymous with the rural landscape.

== Engineering heritage award ==
The Southern Cross windmill received a Historic Engineering Marker from Engineers Australia as part of its Engineering Heritage Recognition Program.

== Notable people ==
- Don Featherstone, employee
