= Queensland B15 class locomotive =

Class of Australian 4-6-0 locomotives

Queensland Railways B15 class
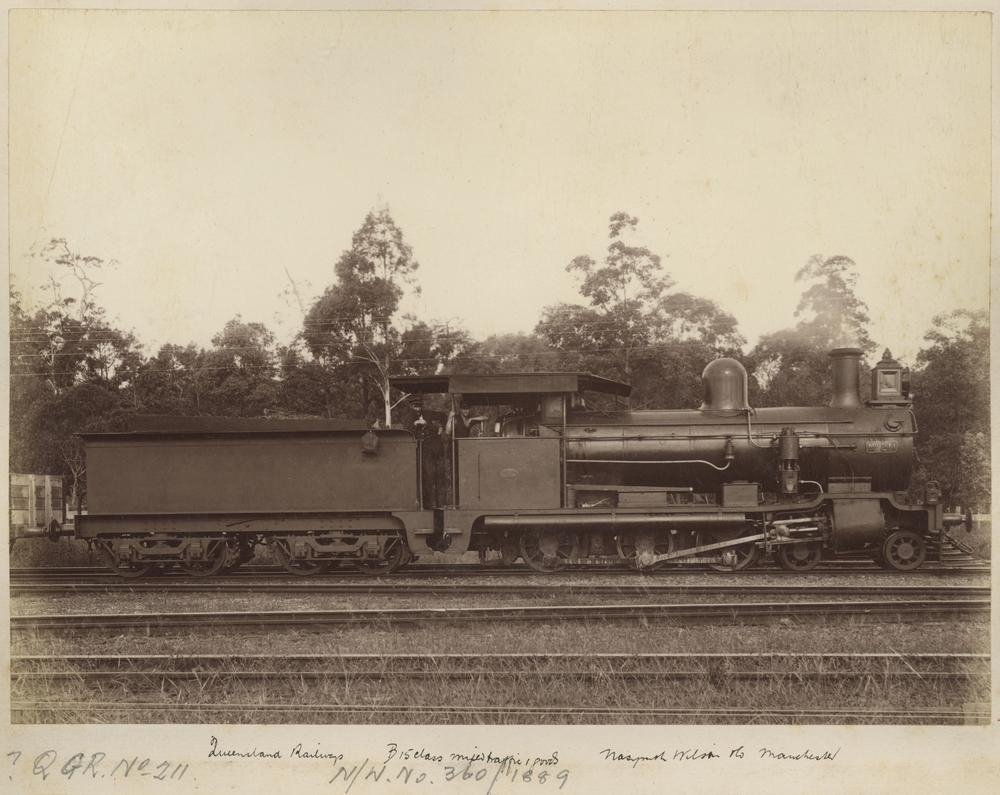
- Photograph of a B15, c.1890
Type and origin
- Power type: Steam
- Builder: Nasmyth, Wilson & Co (15); Evans, Anderson, Phelan & Co (21); Yorkshire Engine Company (10); Walkers Limited (52)
- Build date: 1889-1899
- Total produced: 98
Specifications
- Configuration
  - Whyte: 4-6-0
- Gauge: 1,067 mm (3 ft 6 in)
- Driver dia.: 3 ft 0 in (914 mm) (as built); 3 ft 9 in (1,143 mm) (replacements)
- Length: 45 ft 7 in (13.89 m)
- Fuel type: Coal
- Cylinders: 2
- Cylinder size: 15 in (381 mm)
- Valve gear: Stephenson
Career
- Operators: Queensland Railways
- Numbers: 3, 23, 42, 54, 95, 205-219, 235-244, 270-280, 289-338, 341-346, 539
- Preserved: 290, 299
- Disposition: 2 preserved, 96 scrapped

The Queensland Railways B15 class locomotive is an old class of 4-6-0 engines operated by the Queensland Railways.

== History ==
In 1889 the first B15 class locomotives built by Nasmyth, Wilson & Co entered service. Further orders from Evans, Anderson, Phelan & Co, Yorkshire Engine Company and Walkers Limited saw the class total of 92 engines by 1899. Per Queensland Railway's classification system they were designated the B15 class engine, B representing they had three driving axles, and 15-inch (381 mm) diameter cylinders. A further six engines were acquired In 1919 when the Queensland Railways took over the Chillagoe Railway & Mining Co.

Problems with broken rails saw three sets of 45-inch (1,143 mm) driving wheels acquired from the South Australian Railways and fitted to 336 at North Ipswich Railway Workshops in November 1900. Judged a success, most others were fitted over the next 30 years. They spent most of their life operating out of Cairns.

== Preservation ==
Two examples are preserved.

- 290 at the Workshops Rail Museum
- 299 at Maryborough station
