= Melawondi, Queensland =

Melawondi
- Suburb
- Interactive map of Melawondi
- Coordinates: 26.4138°S 152.6624°E
- Country: Australia
- State: Queensland
- LGA: Gympie Region
- Location: 32.9 km (20.4 mi) S of Gympie; 172 km (107 mi) N of Brisbane

Government
  - State electorate: Gympie
  - Federal division: Wide Bay

Area
  - Total: 9.5 km^{2} (3.7 sq mi)

Population
  - Total: 34 (2021 census)
  - Density: 3.58/km^{2} (9.27/sq mi)
- Time zone: UTC+10:00 (AEST)
- Postcode: 4570
Suburbs around Melawondi
Kandanga Creek	Kandanga	Kandanga
Imbil	Melawondi	Kandanga
Imbil	Imbil	Imbil

Melawondi is a rural locality in the Gympie Region, Queensland, Australia. It is located 20 kilometres (12 mi) south of Gympie. In the 2021 census, Melawondi had a population of 34 people.

== Geography ==
Melawondi railway station is an abandoned railway station on the Mary Valley railway line (26.4119°S 152.6605°E).

== History ==
The locality takes its name from a former railway station. Melawondi is believed to be the name of an Aboriginal clan.

In October 2013, Hyne Timber sold their Melawondi timber mill to Superior Wood Pty Ltd.

== Demographics ==
In the 2016 census, Melawondi had a population of 30 people.

In the 2021 census, Melawondi had a population of 34 people.

== Heritage listings ==
Melawondi has a number of heritage-listed sites, including:

- Melawondi's cream shed (26.4113°S 152.6606°E), one of the three Mary Valley Railway Cream Sheds

== Economy ==
Melawondi Mill is a timber mill owned by Superior Wood Pty Ltd (26.4110°S 152.6624°E). The mill employs approximately 100 people.

== Education ==
There are no schools in Melawondi. The nearest government primary school is Kandanga State School in neighbouring Kandanga to the north-west. The nearest government secondary school is Mary Valley State College in neighbouring Imbil to the south but it only offers secondary education to Year 10. For secondary education to Year 12 the nearest government school is Gympie State High School in Gympie to the north.
