= Evans, Anderson, Phelan & Co =

Defunct Australian manufacturer

- Industry: Engineering
- Headquarters: Kangaroo Point
- Products: Railway rolling stock

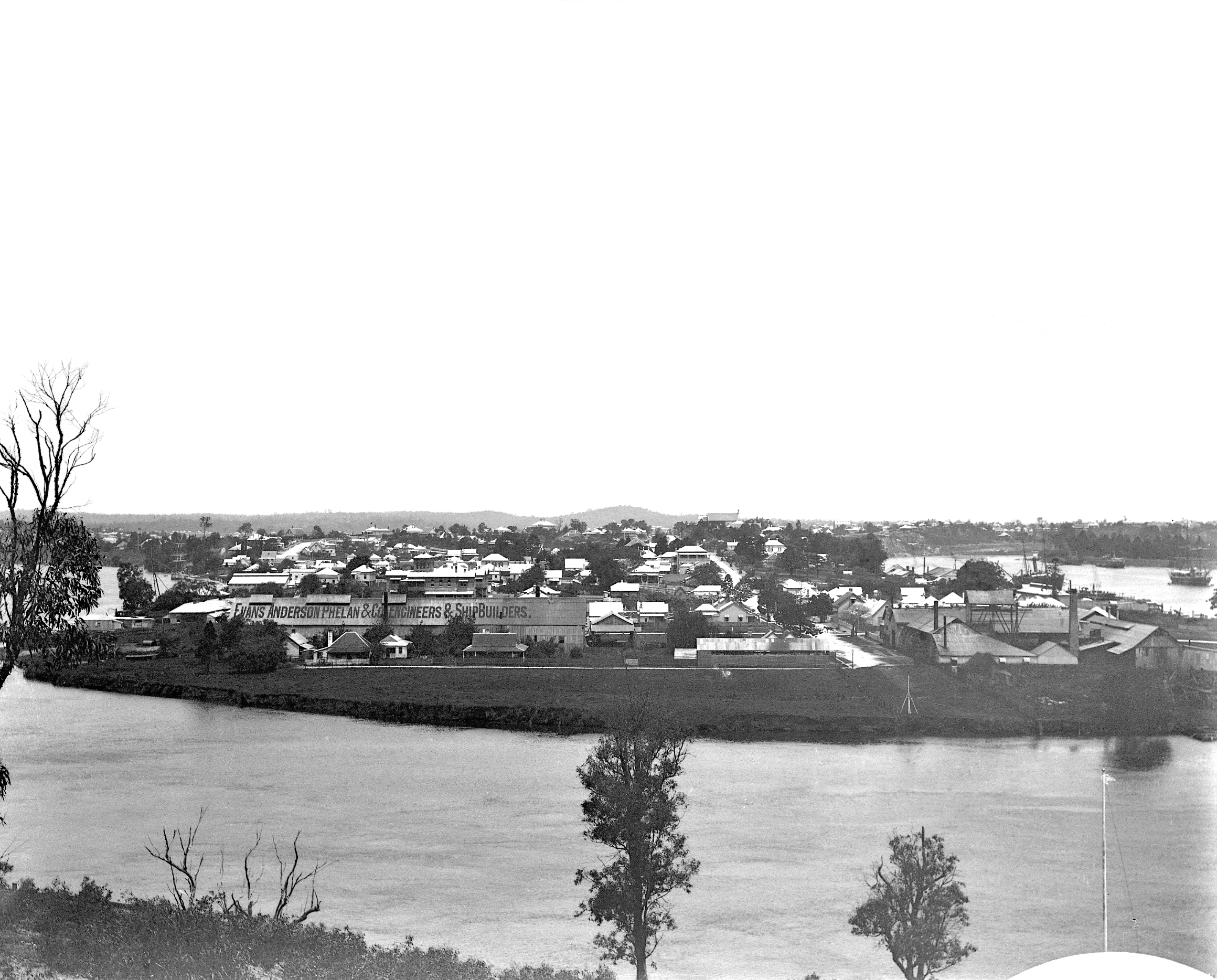
Evans, Anderson, Phelan & Co (circa, 1904)

Evans, Anderson, Phelan & Co was an Australian engineering and railway rolling stock manufacturer, located at Kangaroo Point, Queensland. It manufactured steam locomotives for the Queensland Railways until 1927. The works were not located near a railway, so completed locomotives were delivered along Main Street on temporary track.

In 1892 The North Queensland Register described the company as one of the oldest established iron works in this colony... noted for excellent designs and high class work...(which) manufacture everything incidental to mining and milling work.

== Products ==
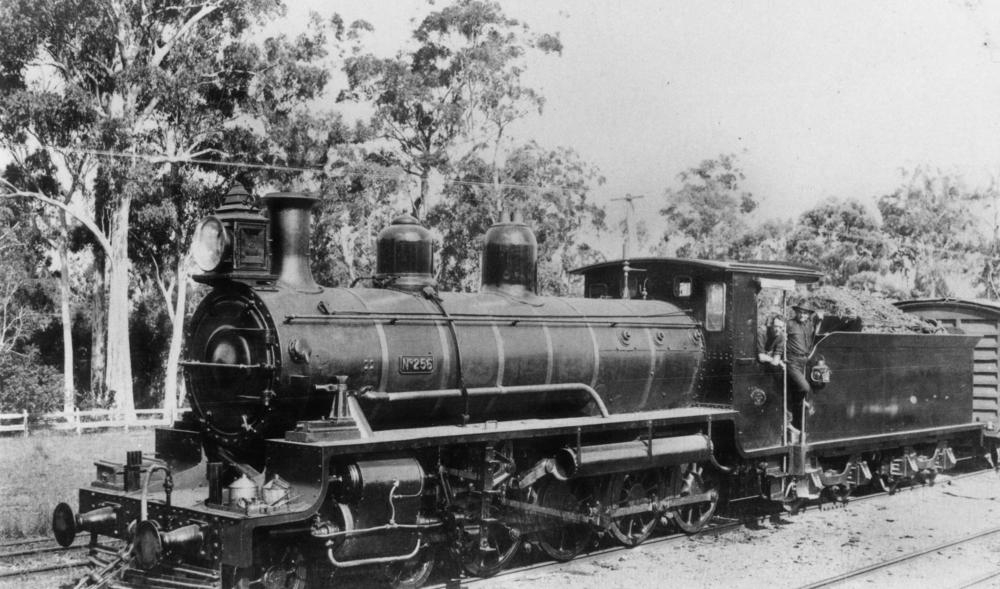
Locomotive no. 256, class C17, built in 1921 by Evans, Anderson, Phelan & Co

- 25 A12 class locomotives
- 21 B15 class locomotives
- 70 PB15 class locomotives
- 41 C16 class locomotives
- 28 C17 class locomotives

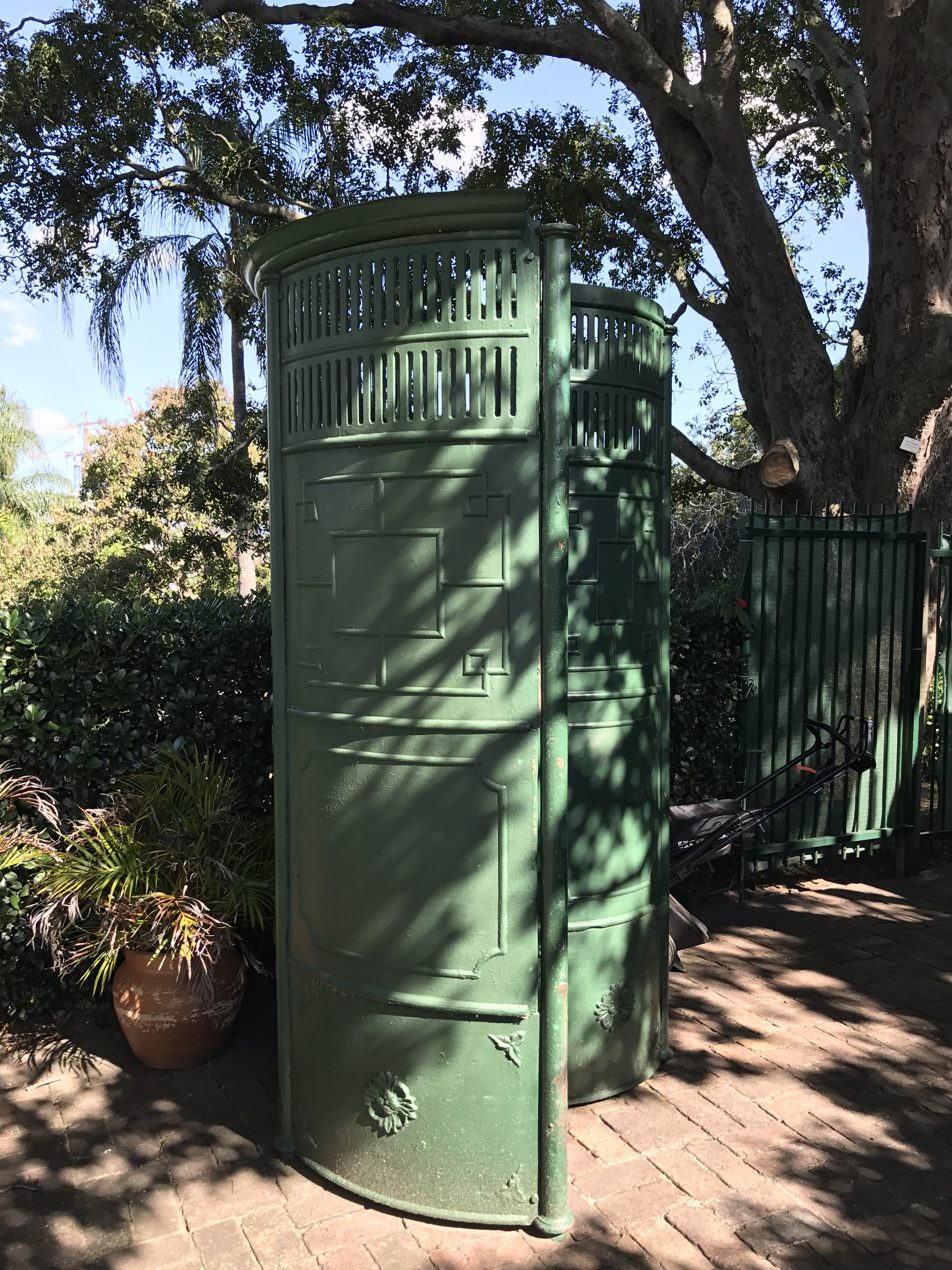
Pissoir by Evans, Anderson, Phelan & Co in the Newstead Park

- Pissoirs
