= Queensland C17 class locomotive =

Class of Australian 4–8–0 locomotives

Queensland Railways C17 class
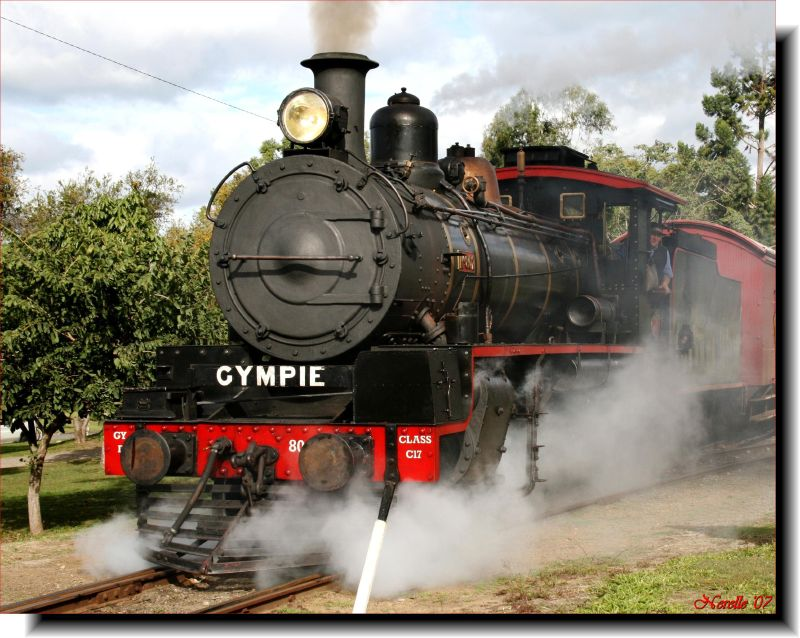
- 802 on the Mary Valley Heritage Railway
Type and origin
- Power type: Steam
- Builder: North Ipswich Railway Workshops (16); Armstrong Whitworth (25); Clyde Engineering (20); Walkers Limited (138); Evans, Anderson, Phelan & Co (28)
- Serial number: AW 850–874, Clyde 494–497, 499–513, 558, EAP 158–185, North Ipswich 83–92, 158–163, Walkers 319–358, 399–438, 474–485, 492–537
- Build date: 1920–1953
- Total produced: 227
Specifications
- Configuration
  - Whyte: 4-8-0
- Gauge: 1,067 mm (3 ft 6 in)
- Driver dia.: 45 in (1,143 mm)
- Length: 53 ft 5 1/2 in (16.29 m)
- Fuel type: Coal
- Firebox
  - Grate area: 18.5 sq ft (1.72 m^{2})
- Boiler pressure: 175 lbf/in^{2} (1,207 kPa)
- Cylinders: 2 outside
- Cylinder size: 17 in × 22 in (432 mm × 559 mm)
- Valve gear: Walschaerts
Performance figures
- Tractive effort: 21,016 lbf (93.5 kN)
Career
- Operators: Queensland Railways
- Numbers: 2, 15, 17, 24, 25, 29, 32, 33, 45, 46, 55, 57, 62, 68, 121, 138, 145-147, 165, 166, 179, 182, 187, 188, 191, 226, 245-259, 261, 263, 264, 308, 705-730, 752-767, 772-791, 802-826, 831-840, 858-863, 917-948, 955-1000
- Disposition: 25 preserved, remainder scrapped

The Queensland Railways C17 class locomotive are a class of 4-8-0 steam locomotives operated by the Queensland Railways.

== History ==
The C17 class was introduced as an improved version of the C16 class. Per Queensland Railway's classification system they were designated the C17 class, C representing they had four driving axles, and 17 representing the cylinder diameter in inches.

The design was so successful that 227 locomotives were built from 1920 when the first engine Nº 15 entering service through until 1953 when Nº 1000 was delivered. The Commonwealth Railways NM class were of the same design.

They were used to haul Mail trains on lines that could not accommodate heavier B18¼ class, also suburban passenger, mixed, goods and branch line trains. Until 1948 they were the heaviest engines that could work north of Mackay. Prior to the introduction of 60 long tons (67 short tons; 61 t) diesel electric locomotives, they were responsible for hauling the air-conditioned Inlander, Midlander and Westlander trains for parts of their respective journeys.

First engines had large steam domes, open cabs and C16 style tenders. Those built from 1938 onwards, commencing with N°858, had small steam domes, sedan cabs with welded tenders and also larger diameter (9 1/2 in or 241 mm) piston valves. The two types of boilers were occasionally interchanged at overhauls and by later years most of the old style ones had been replaced. The last 40 engines, Nº961 to Nº1000, were fitted with Timken roller bearings and painted brown. They acquired the nickname of Brown Bombers after American boxer Joe Louis. Those overhauled in the last years of steam operations were repainted black. A number of modifications were carried out over their life including the fitting of large mushroom air snifting valves. Several had additional sandboxes and/or rear headlights fitted at various times for working lines where no turning facilities were available.

On 5 May 1947, C17 class locomotive 824 left the rails near Camp Mountain on the Dayboro line claiming the lives of 16 people and 38 injured. The Commonwealth Department of Trade & Customs Recreation and Social Club had chartered the train for a picnic at Closeburn. Negotiating a sharp curve at excessive speed caused the tragedy. The locomotive was repaired and continued in service until May 1967 when it was transferred to Injune along the recently closed line.

== Preservation ==
Twenty-five have been preserved:

- 2 at the North Ipswich Railway Workshops
- 45 at Mary Valley Rattler
- 251 plinthed in Townsville
- 253 at Mary Valley Rattler
- 705 at Mary Valley Rattler, loaned to the Imbil Progress Association for display
- 720 at the Rosewood Railway Museum
- 721 plinthed in Jandowae as 719
- 761 currently undergoing overhaul at QPSR
- 763 at the Murgon Men's Shed
- 802 at Downs Explorer
- 812 at Downs Explorer
- 819 at Mary Valley Rattler
- 824 plinthed in Injune numbered as 809
- 934 at Zig Zag Railway
- 935 at Downs Explorer
- 944 at the Miles Historical Village and Museum
- 965 plinthed in Mundubbera
- 966 "City of Rockhampton" at Zig Zag Railway
- 967 at Mary Valley Rattler - operational
- 971 at Downs Explorer - undergoing restoration
- 974 at the Queensland Rail Heritage Division - undergoing maintenance
- 980 by the Blackwater Lions Club
- 988 at Archer Park Station & Steam Tram Museum, Rockhampton
- 996 at Mary Valley Rattler
- 1000 Queensland Rail Heritage Division, stored at the Workshops Rail Museum
