= Gympie railway station =

Former railway station in Gympie, Queensland

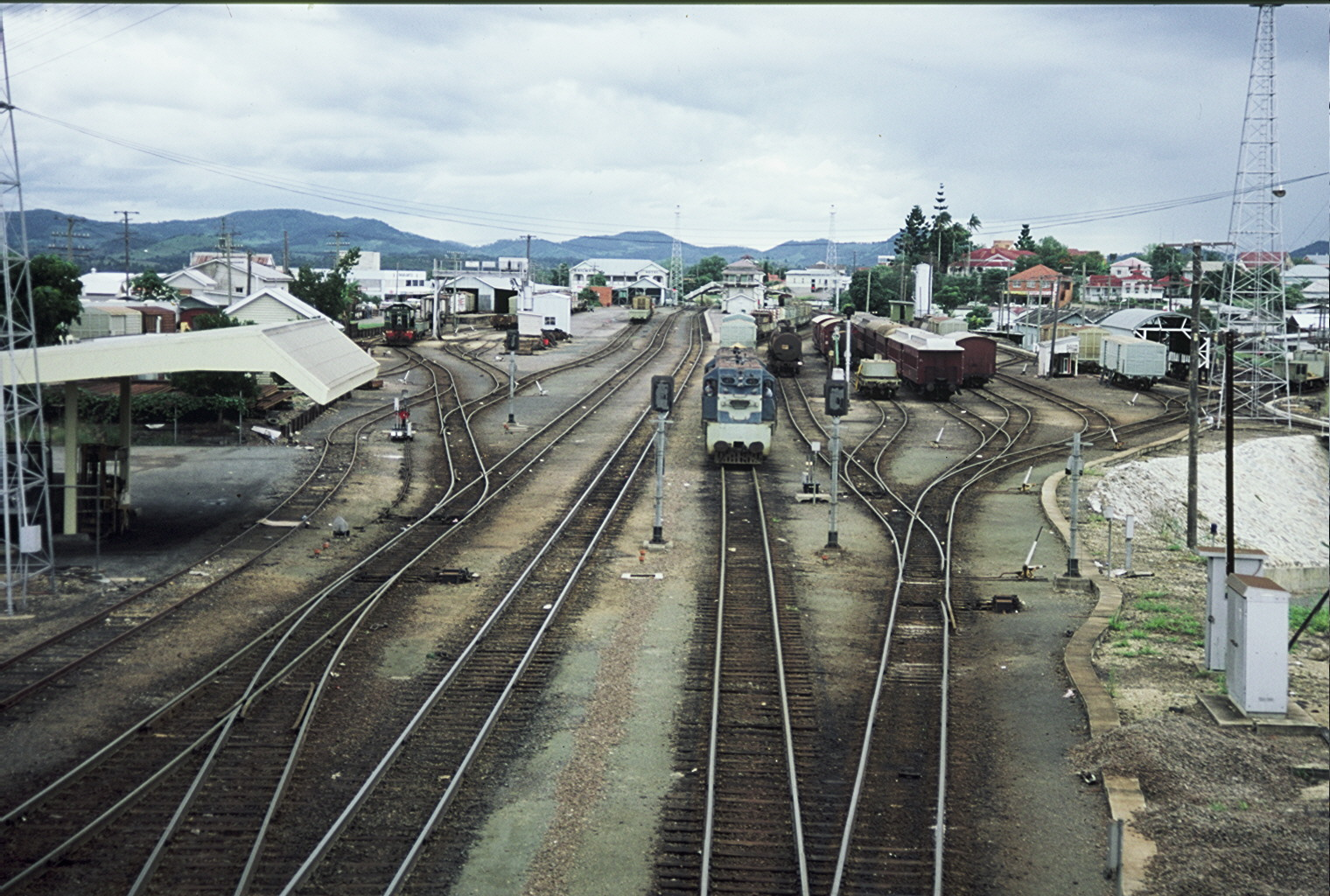
- Southbound view of Gympie rail yard, 1987

- Location within Queensland Location within Australia
- 26.1874°S 152.6712°E
- Location: Tozer Street, Gympie

History
- Built: 1910s

Queensland Heritage Register
- Official name: Gympie Railway Station Platform Complex
- Type: state heritage (landscape, built)
- Designated: 14 October 2011
- Reference no.: 602036
- Significant period: 1889–1960s (historical)

Gympie railway station is an Australian heritage-listed former railway station in Gympie, Queensland, on the North Coast line. It was the primary railway station serving Gympie from 1881 until 1989.

== Original railway station ==
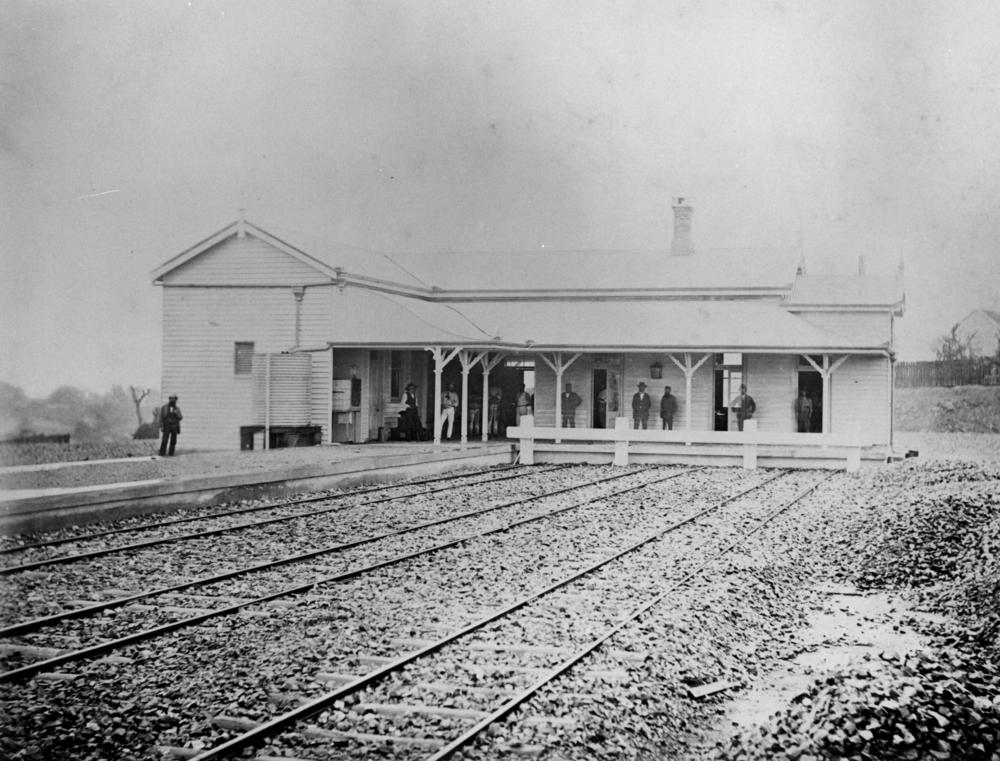
Dead end station in 1882

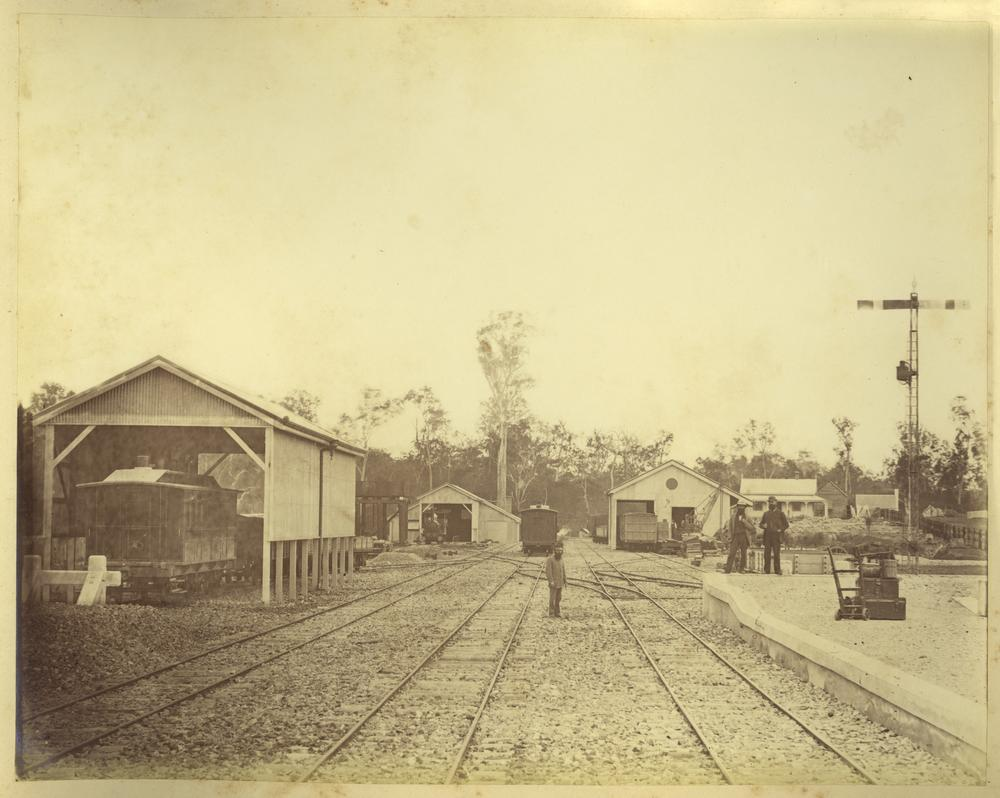
View of the yard in 1882

After the discovery of gold in October 1867 by James Nash in Gympie, the requirement for a railway line linked to a port became apparent. In 1877, the Queensland Government approved the construction of three railways to connect mining towns to their principal ports: Townsville to Charters Towers; Bundaberg to Mount Perry; and Maryborough to Gympie. The station buildings at Gympie and Maryborough were positioned at the terminus of the track line, marking the railway's dead end status. The line opened on 6 August 1881.

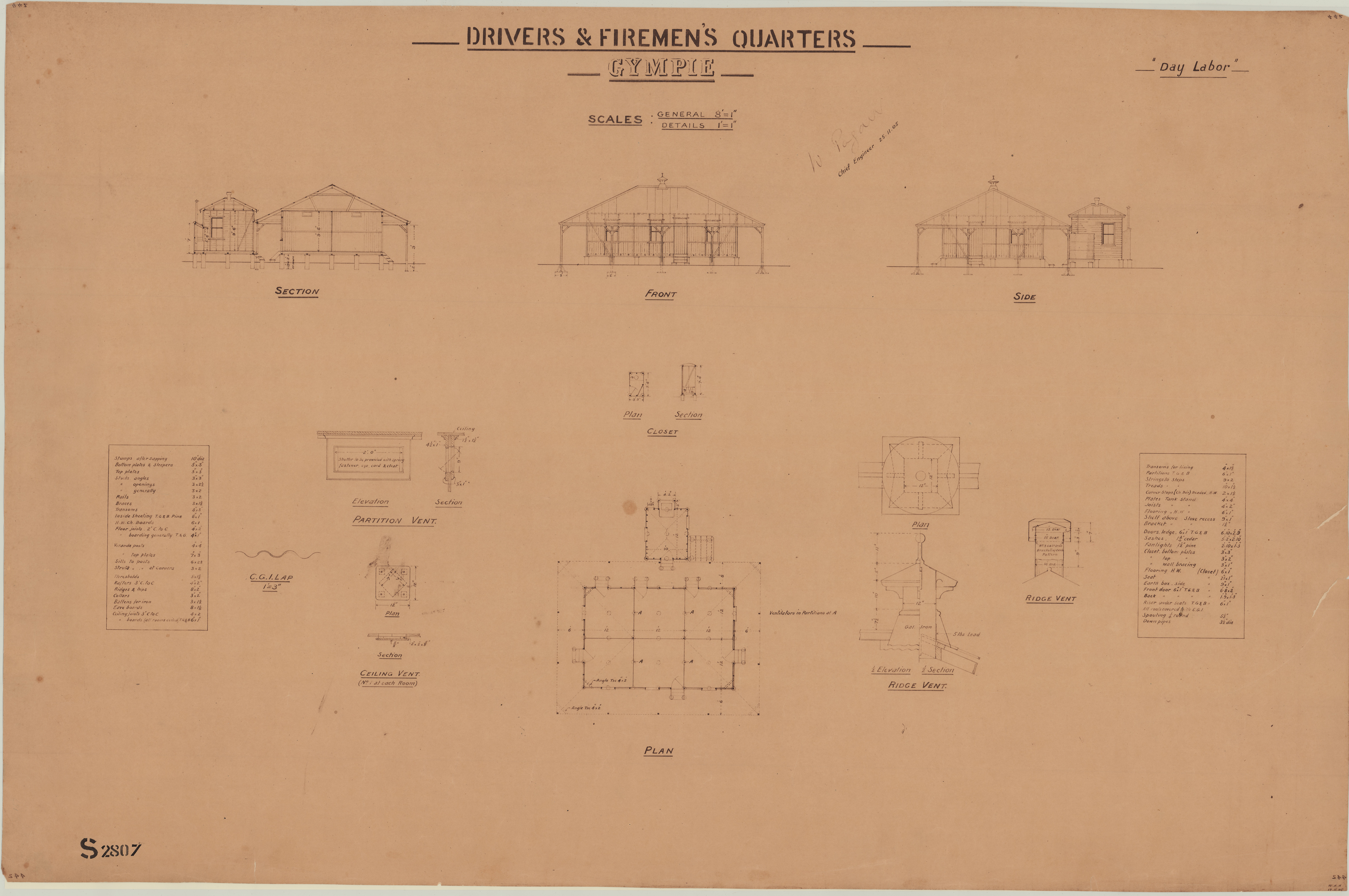
Architectural plans for Railway Drivers and Firemen's quarters, 1905

Within a year of the line opening, Gympie representatives began lobbying for a rail link to Brisbane and on 17 July 1891, the Gympie to Brisbane line was opened. This is when the original building was relocated from the end of the track to the southern side of the line, allowing the line to pass through Gympie.

== 1913 station ==
The passing of the North Coast Railway Act in 1910 which linked the separate regional divisions of Queensland Railways into one network, provided increased spending and construction works within Queensland railways. Construction commenced on the present station in 1913, which commenced operations on 1 December 1913. The station was based on the Queensland Railways A ‘Pagoda’ standard design. Positioned on an island platform the long, narrow chamfer-board building housed: a bar; refreshment room and servery; waiting room; ladies room; station master's office; telegraph and booking office; and a sheltered sales area. The smaller upper floor housed: the kitchen; scullery; and pantry. This floor was serviced by a hand-operated lift.

=== Major works ===
Other major works to improve the facilities include

- A subway and luggage lift to provide access from the southern end of the island platform to the station entrance.
- An adjacent underpass to replace the gated crossing between Station Road and Mellor Street.
- A large timber two-span overbridge with steps leading from the island platform and steps leading onto Lady Mary Terrace and Station Road.

=== Closure ===
After 1906, gold production declined and by 1925 the last of the big mines had ceased operations. Agriculture and dairying had begun to emerge as key industries within the Gympie district and in 1915 the Mary Valley branch railway was opened. These industries heavily relied on rail transport. Fruit trains began operating from Gympie to Melbourne from 1923, and in 1929 the Gympie Fruit Growers Co-operative Association erected their premises opposite the station on Tozer Street.

By the 1930s, the Gympie Railway Station Complex had evolved into one of Queensland's most substantial and busy railway complexes. In 1963 a new ticket and parcel office was built within the former parking area adjoining the subway entrance (where the Gympie Family History Society is now located). For over a century the station complex was intrinsically linked to the economy of Gympie and surrounding areas and played an important role in Queensland's rail network however by the end of the 1980s it had become mostly redundant.

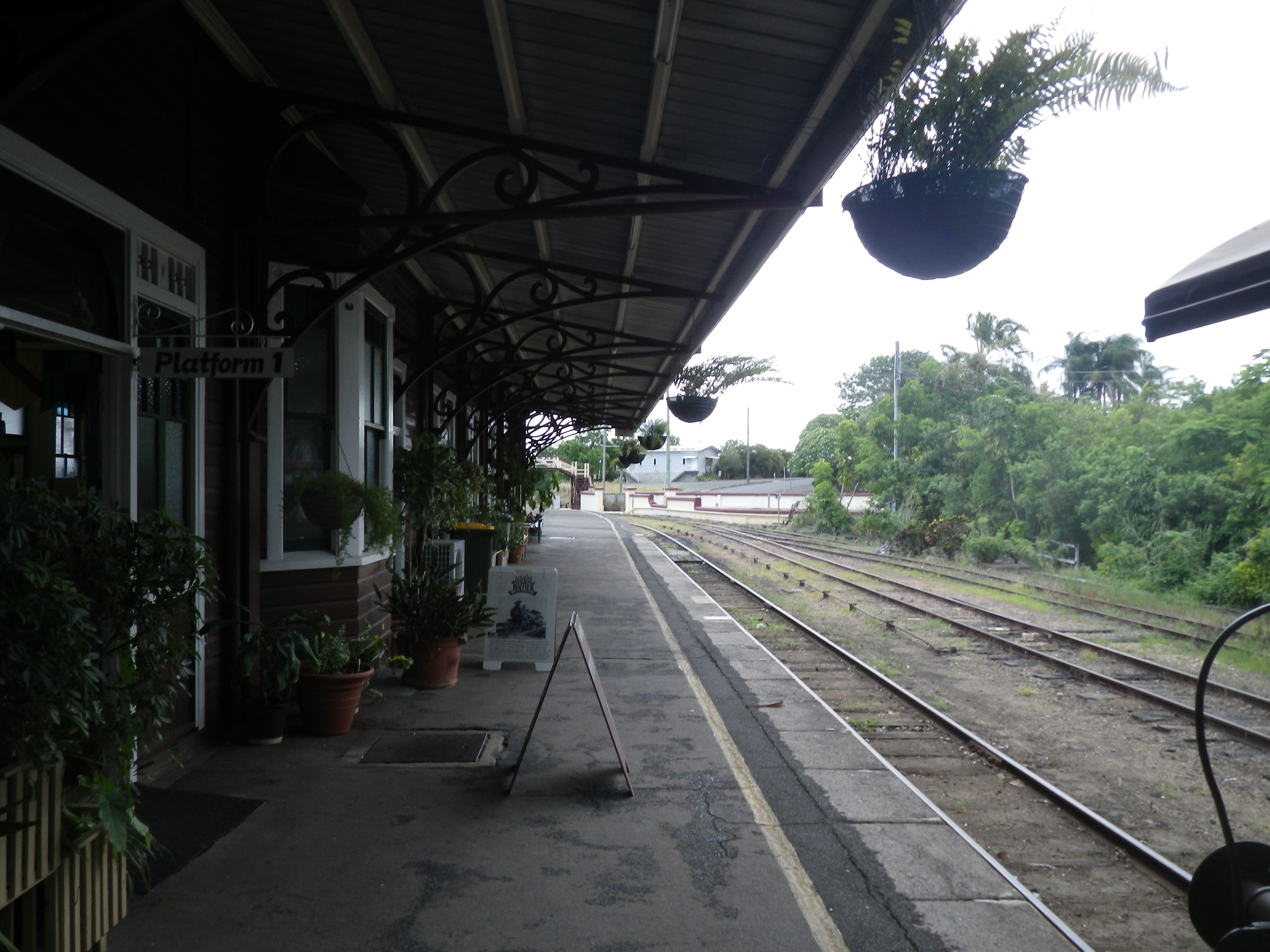
Southbound view in January 2012

As part of the electrification of the North Coast line between Brisbane and Rockhampton, an eight kilometre eastern deviation bypassed the station, with a new Gympie North station opening on 4 February 1989. Gympie was relegated to a freight depot, closing In 1995. On 9 November 1998, the line from Gympie North station to Gympie station was closed at a point 300 metres (980 ft) north of the station.

== Mary Valley Rattler ==
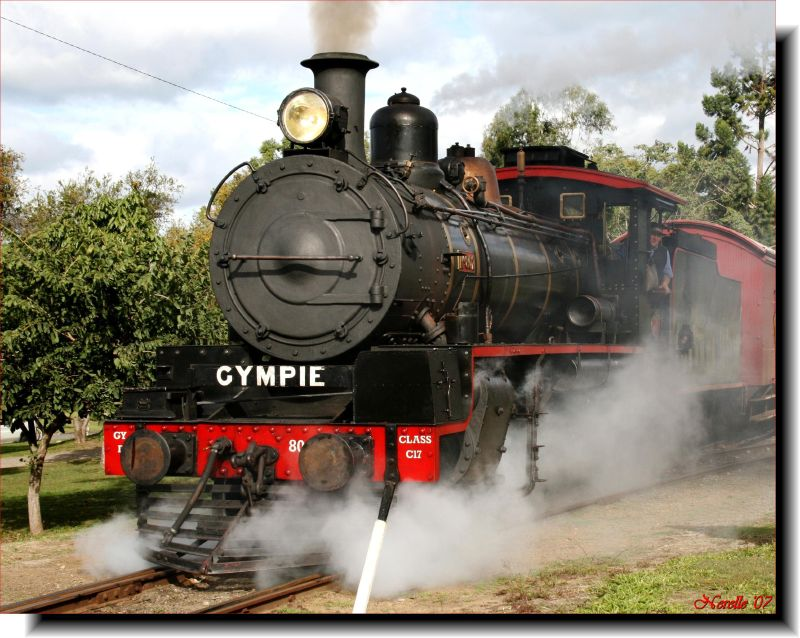
Mary Valley Rattler Queensland C17 class locomotive hauling the Valley Rattler at Imbil

The Mary Valley Heritage Railway became the custodians of much of the Gympie Railway Station Complex through a lease from the Queensland Railways for 50 years and on 23 May 1998 the Valley Rattler began operations on the former Mary Valley branch line after negotiations for the lease was extended to the line to Imbil and became a major tourist attraction of the region.

After two very serious derailments during August and September 2012, the limitations and state of the railway company's finances became known. It was shut down indefinitely by Transport & Main Roads, as it was declared unsafe to convey passengers. Following flood damage in 2013, the railway disbanded. In June 2016, the Gympie Regional Council allocated $250,000 for operational start-up costs and $3.8 million for capital funds to restart the Rattler.

== Heritage listing ==
The station was listed on the Queensland Heritage Register on 14 October 2011.
