= Kandanga, Queensland =

Kandanga
- Town
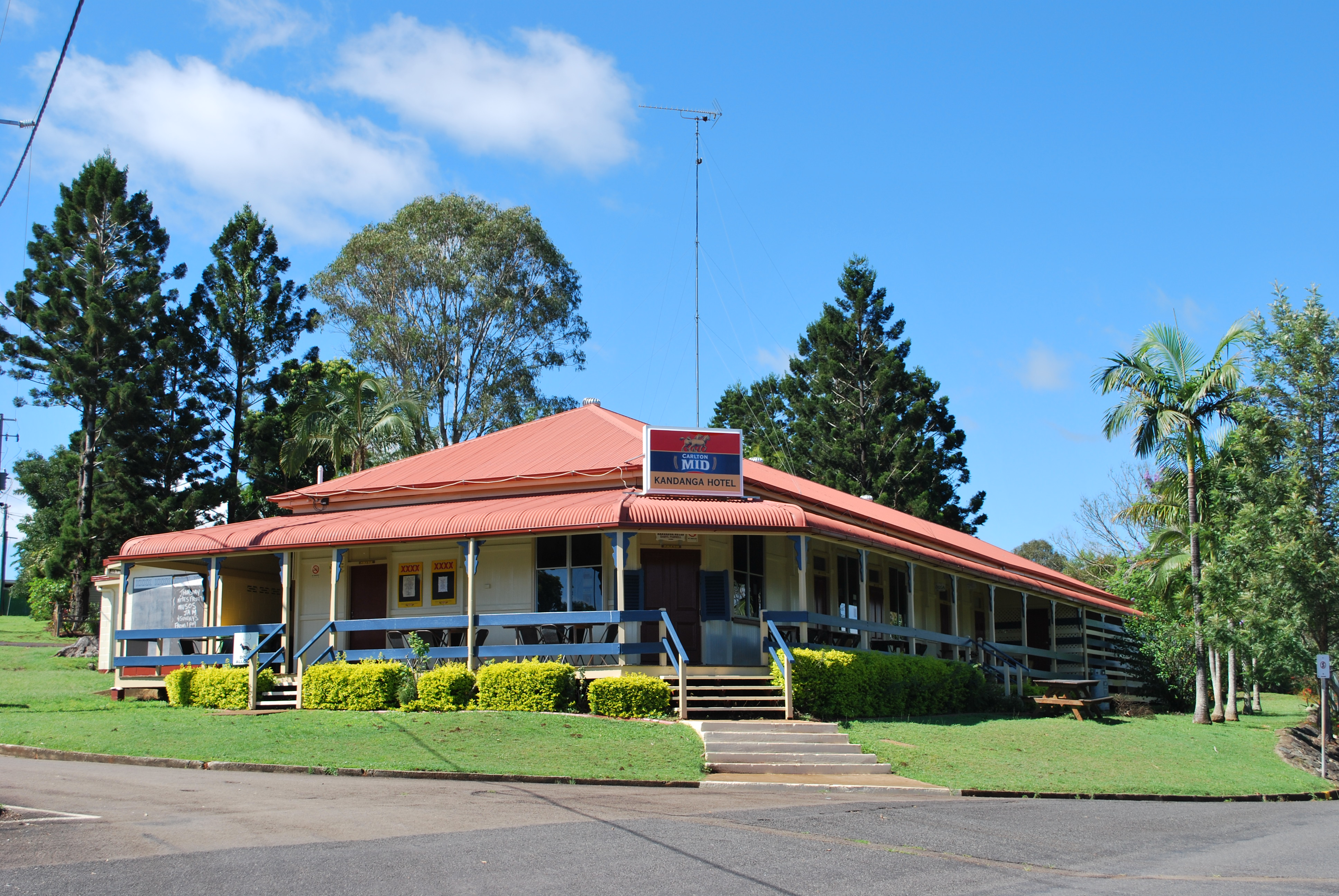
- Kandanga Hotel

- Interactive map of Kandanga
- Coordinates: 26.3875°S 152.6777°E
- Country: Australia
- State: Queensland
- LGA: Gympie Region
- Location: 8.6 km (5.3 mi) N of Imbil; 26.7 km (16.6 mi) S of Gympie; 156 km (97 mi) NNW of Brisbane

Government
  - State electorate: Gympie
  - Federal division: Wide Bay

Area
  - Total: 47.2 km^{2} (18.2 sq mi)

Population
  - Total: 659 (2021 census)
  - Density: 13.962/km^{2} (36.16/sq mi)
- Time zone: UTC+10:00 (AEST)
- Postcode: 4570
Localities around Kandanga
| Amamoor | Amamoor | Coles Creek |
| Kandanga Creek | Kandanga | Tuchekoi |
| Melawondi | Imbil | Bollier |

Kandanga is a rural town and locality in the Gympie Region, Queensland, Australia. In the 2021 census, the locality of Kandanga had a population of 659 people.

== Geography ==
The town is located on the Mary Valley Road (State Route 51) 160 kilometres (99 mi) north of the state capital, Brisbane and 28 kilometres (17 mi) south west of Gympie, on the banks of Kandanga Creek, a tributary of the Mary River. This river forms the eastern and north-eastern boundaries of the locality.

Kandanga is one of a chain of towns in the Mary Valley also including Imbil, Amamoor and Dagun.

== History ==
The first township in the area was called Bunya Creek. When the railway sideling opened to Kandanga in 1914, the town moved to its present site and adopted its current name.

The name "Kandanga" may be derived from the local Kabi Aboriginal language, meaning a fork or sharp bend of the creek or it may refer to the cabbage tree.

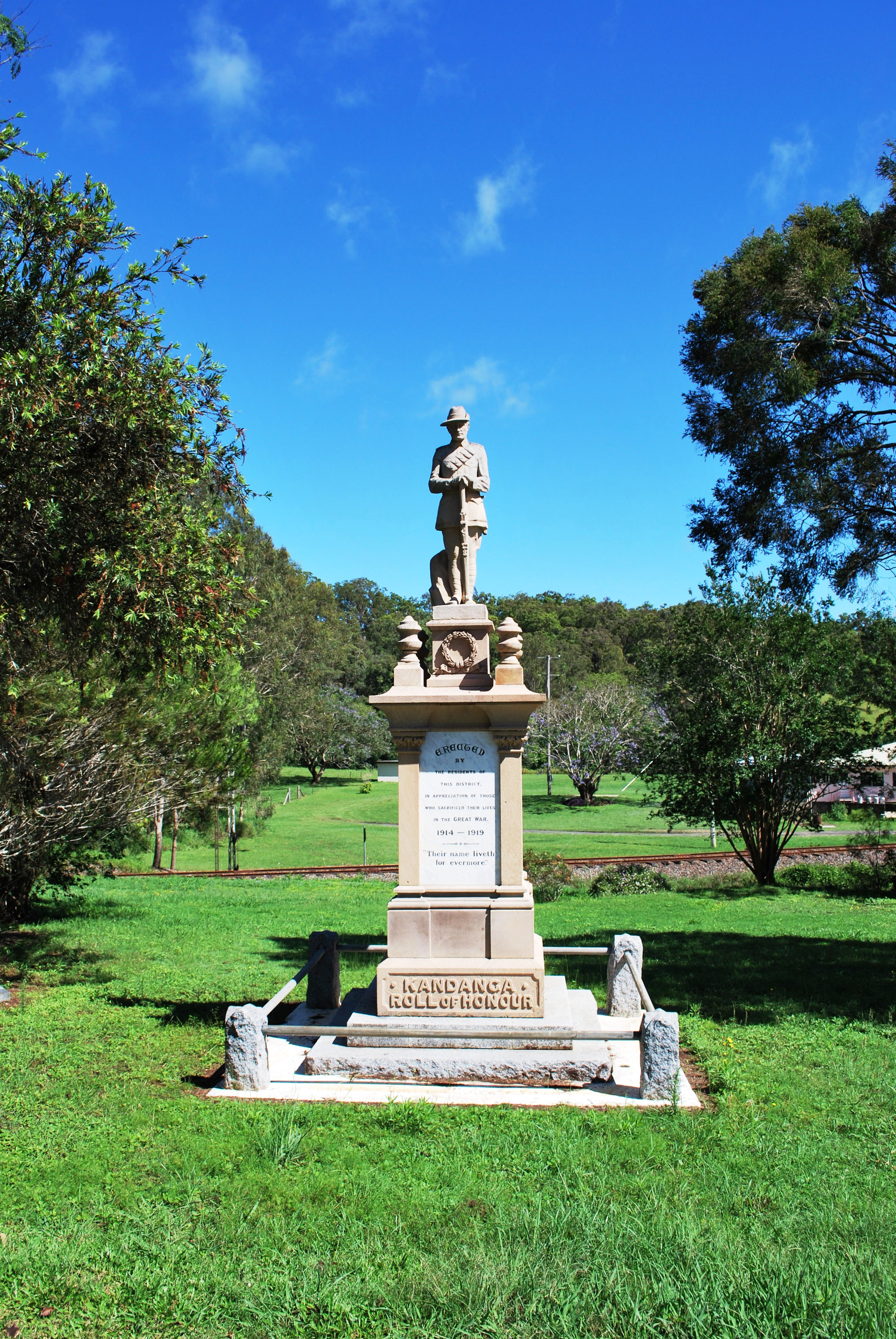
Kandanga War Memorial, 2008

Kandanga Post Office opened by June 1914 (a receiving office had been open from 1895).

Kandanga State School opened in September 1915.

The Kandanga War Memorial was unveiled on 11 November 1920 by the Member of the Queensland Legislative Assembly for the Cooroora Harry Walker.

In 2006, the Beattie state government announced plans to construct the Traveston Crossing Dam at Traveston Crossing on the upper Mary River. The proposed dam, designed to provide water to the growing Sunshine Coast, was to have flooded fertile farmland, including Kandanga. However, the dam did not proceed on environmental grounds, but not before much of the land required was bought up and the original owners moved on. A reconstruction plan was implemented following the decision to not build the dam, with farm land subdivided and offered to new owners who have introduced new crops to the Mary Valley.

On 12 December 2015, the 101-year-old Kandanga Hotel burned down following a fire which started in the kitchen. Local people rallied to establish a temporary hotel next door until the hotel could be rebuilt. The hotel reopened on 12 July 2017.

== Demographics ==
In the 2006 census, the locality of Kandanga had a population of 596 people.

In the 2016 census, the locality of Kandanga had a population of 665 people.

In the 2021 census, the locality of Kandanga had a population of 659 people.

== Heritage listings ==
Kadanga has a number of heritage-listed sites, including:

- Mary Valley Railway Cream Sheds
- Kandanga Railway Station, Main Street
- Kandanga Cottage, 65 Main Street
- Kandanga Memorial Hall, 81 Main Street
- Kandanga State School, 84–86 Main Street
- Sacred Heart Catholic Church, 41–45 Stephens Street

== Education ==
Kandanga State School is a government primary (Prep–6) school for boys and girls at 84 Main Street (26.3874°S 152.6801°E). In 2018, the school had an enrolment of 44 students with 4 teachers (3 full-time equivalent) and 6 non-teaching staff (3 full-time equivalent).

There are no secondary schools in Kandanga. The nearest government secondary schools are Mary Valley State College (to Year 10) in neighbouring Imbil to the south and Gympie State High School (to Year 12) in Gympie to the north.
