= Manyung =

- Town
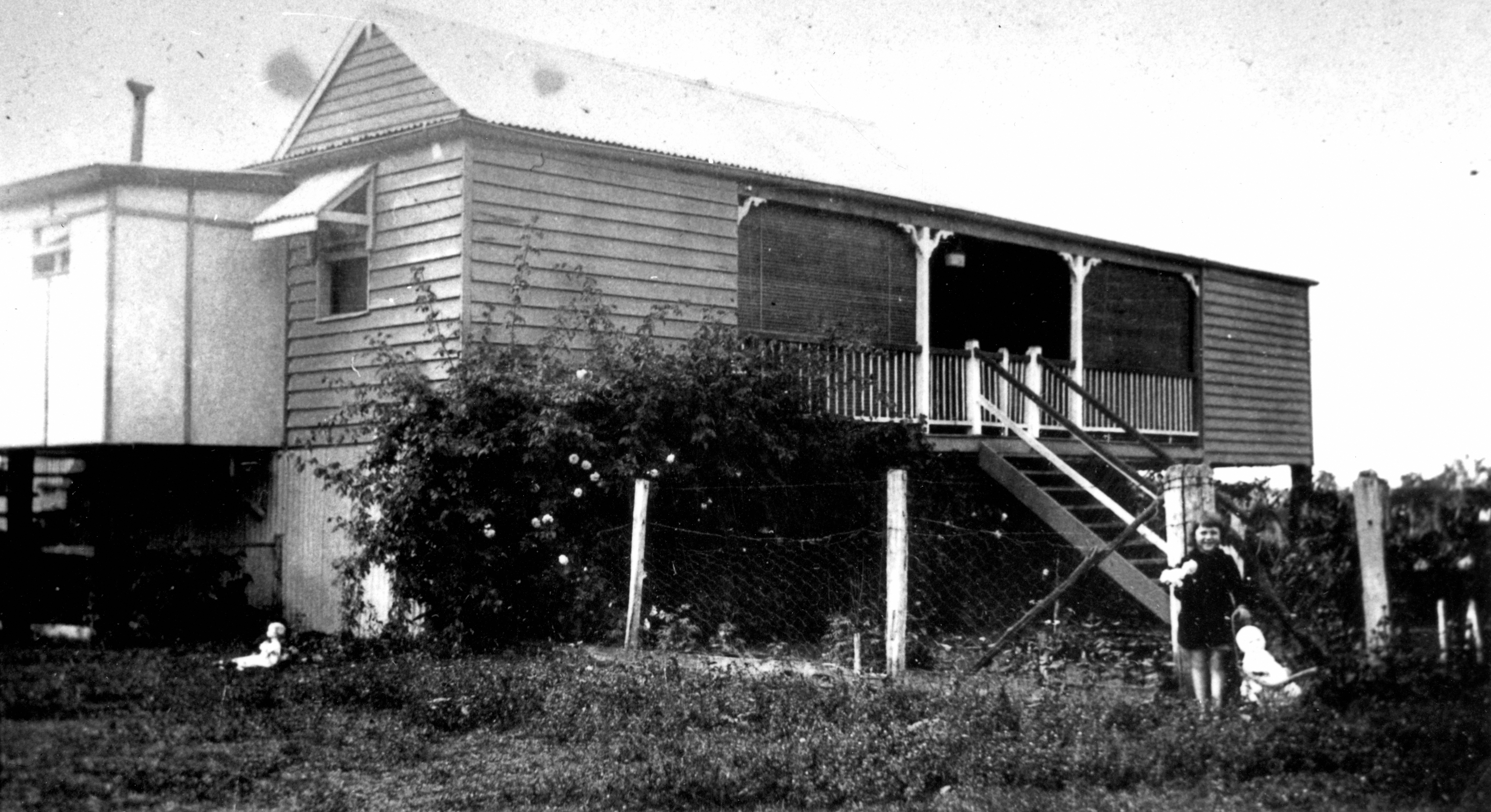
- Manyung farmhouse

- Interactive map of Manyung
- Coordinates: 26.2032°S 152.0263°E
- Country: Australia
- State: Queensland
- LGA: Gympie Region
- Location: 10.8 km (6.7 mi) NE of Murgon; 56.3 km (35.0 mi) NE of Kingaroy; 81.3 km (50.5 mi) W of Gympie; 256 km (159 mi) NNW of Brisbane

Government
  - State electorate: Nanango
  - Federal division: Wide Bay

Area
  - Total: 37.3 km^{2} (14.4 sq mi)

Population
  - Total: 83 (2021 census)
  - Density: 2.225/km^{2} (5.76/sq mi)
- Time zone: UTC+10:00 (AEST)
- Postcode: 4605
Localities around Manyung
Goomeribong	Goomeribong	Goomeri
Murgon	Manyung	Goomeri
Murgon	Moondooner	Goomeri

Manyung is a rural town in the Gympie Region with the locality split between the Gympie Region and the South Burnett Region, Queensland, Australia. In the 2021 census, Manyung had a population of 83 people.

== Geography ==
The town is located in the north of the locality (within the Gympie Region). As at 2024, very few town lots have buildings.

The Bunya Highway enters the locality from the north-east (Goomeri) and exits to the south (Moondooner). It bypasses the town to the south.

The land use in the locality is predominantly grazing on native vegetation.

== History ==
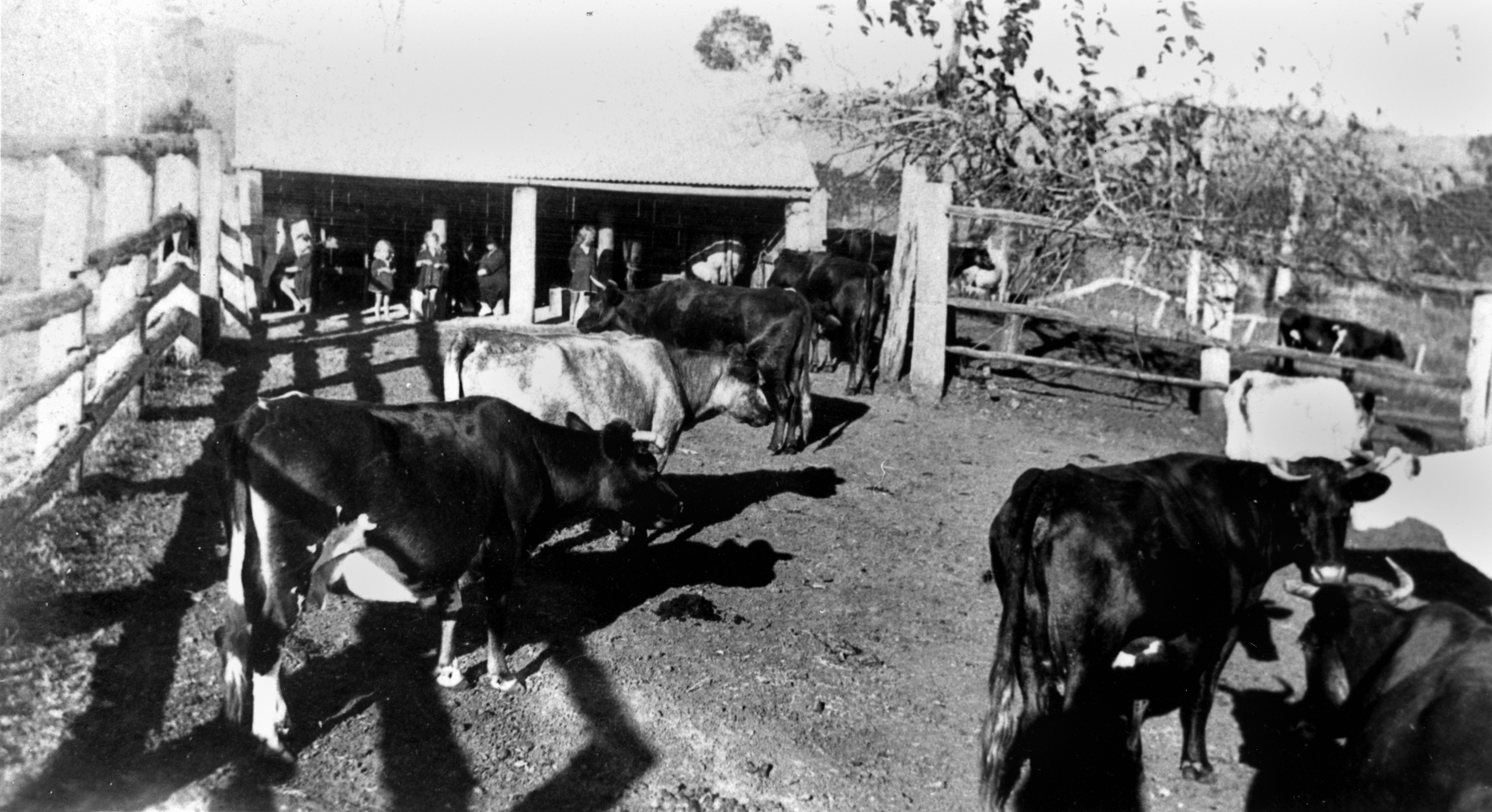
Cows at Manyung Farm

Opened on 14 September 1903, the fourth stage of the Nanango railway line took the line from Goomeri south to Wondai after passing through Manyung, Moondooner and Murgon. Manyung railway station served the town (26.2048°S 152.0272°E). Prior to 1910, Manyung railway station was called Yura.

The locality takes its name from the Manyung railway station name, assigned on 20 August 1910 by the Queensland Railways Department. Manyung is thought to be a Waka language word (possibly Bujiebara dialect) munum meaning either death adder or scrub fruit.

In January 1912, the Queensland Government offered for sale 46 town lots of sizes varying from 1 to 3 roods (1,000 to 3,000 m^{2}) at a cost of £8 to £25.

Manyung Provisional School opened on 28 October 1912. Tenders On 1 January 1916, it became Manyung State School. In 1921, it was relocated. It closed on 31 December 1963.

The railway line through Manyung closed in 2010. The line has been redeveloped from Kingaroy to Kilkivan as the South Burnett Rail Trail, but, as at 2024, the section from Moondooner to Kilkivan is closed.

== Demographics ==
In the 2016 census, Manyung had a population of 63 people.

In the 2021 census, Manyung had a population of 83 people.

== Education ==
There are no schools in Manyung. The nearest government primary schools are Murgon State School in neighbouring Murgon to the south-west and Goomeri State School in neighbouring Goomeri to the north-east. The nearest government secondary schools are Murgon State High School (to Year 12) in Murgon and Goomeri State School (to Year 10) in Goomeri.
