= Kinbombi =

- Town
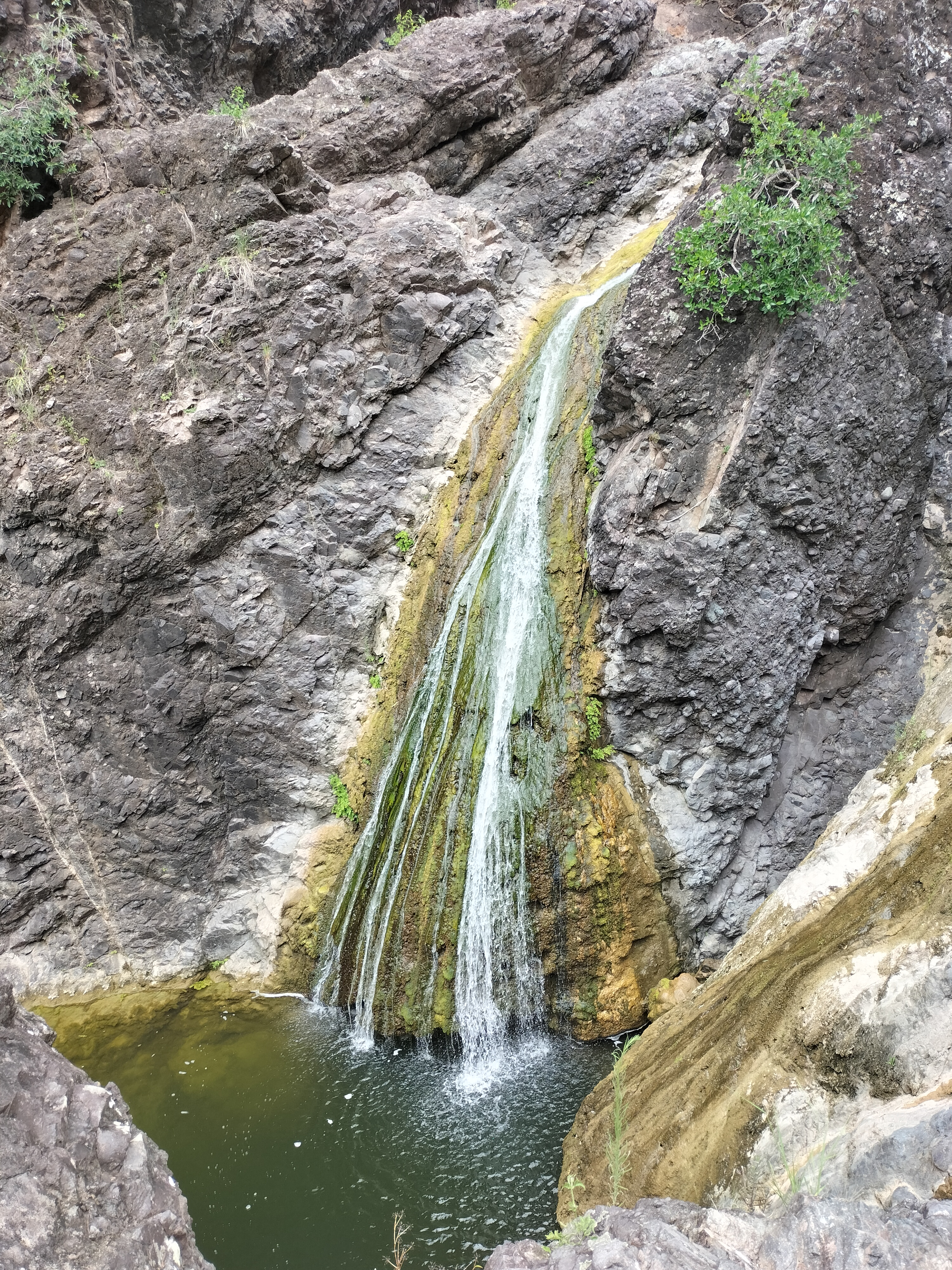
- Kinbombi Falls

- Interactive map of Kinbombi
- Coordinates: 26.1963°S 152.1222°E
- Country: Australia
- State: Queensland
- LGA: Gympie Region
- Location: 6.4 km (4.0 mi) ESE of Goomeri; 19.1 km (11.9 mi) SW of Kilkivan; 23.3 km (14.5 mi) ENE of Murgon; 69.1 km (42.9 mi) W of Gympie; 234 km (145 mi) NNW of Brisbane

Government
  - State electorate: Nanango
  - Federal division: Wide Bay

Area
  - Total: 114.3 km^{2} (44.1 sq mi)

Population
  - Total: 34 (2021 census)
  - Density: 0.297/km^{2} (0.770/sq mi)
- Time zone: UTC+10:00 (AEST)
- Postcode: 4601
Localities around Kinbombi
Goomeri	Cinnabar	Cinnabar
Goomeri	Kinbombi	Cinnabar
Barambah	Manumbar	Manumbar

Kinbombi is a rural town and locality in the Gympie Region, Queensland, Australia. In the 2021 census, the locality of Kinbombi had a population of 34 people.

== Geography ==
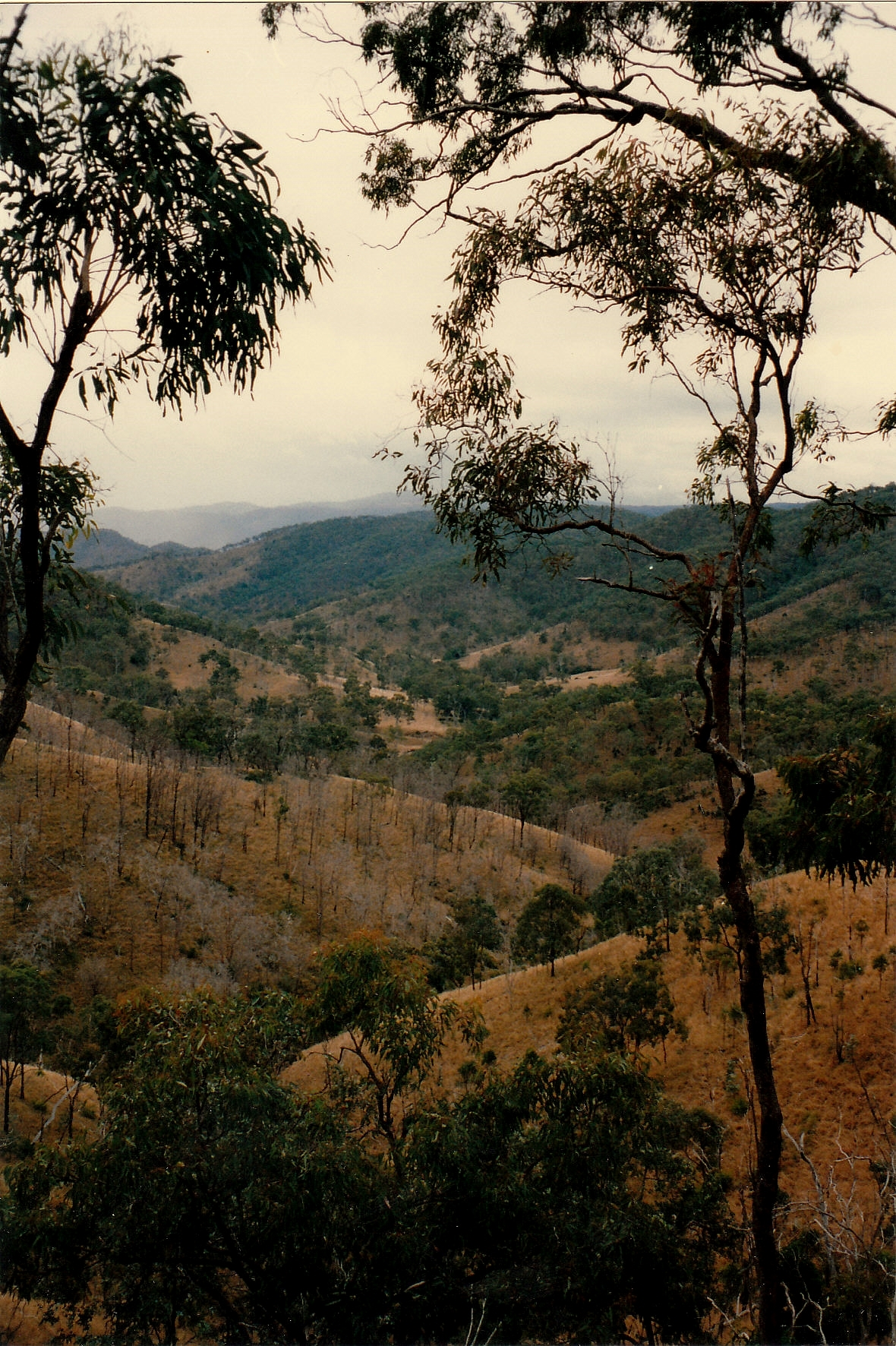
Bushland from Kinbombie looking south to Gallangowan

The Wide Bay Highway passes through from east to west. The town is positioned centrally within the locality.

Coleman is a neighbourhood in the north of the locality (26.1583°S 152.1344°E).

The Nanango railway line enters the locality from the north (Cinnabar), passes through Colman railway station (26.1581°S 152.1348°E) in the north of the locality and then to the town served by Kinbombi railway station (26.1956°S 152.1212°E) and then exits the locality to the west (Goomeri). The railway line has now been dismantled and the railway stations abandoned.

== History ==
The Kilkvan to Goomeri section of the Nanango railway line opened in 1902. The township takes its name from that assigned to the Kinbombi railway station, which is derived from an Aboriginal word in the Kabi language, indicating a fight concerning a woman (gin meaning woman and bombe meaning hit).

Coleman takes its name from the Coleman railway station which was named by the Queensland Railways Department. The station was used until 8 December 1989.

Kabunga Provisional School opened in 1924 and closed in 1926.

Kinbombi State School opened on 1 June 1926 and closed on 16 September 1938. It was located off the Wide Bay Highway (26.1986°S 152.1179°E).

In addition to the railway station, there was also a store in Kinbombi (combined store, service station and post office), as well as a sawmill operation.

== Demographics ==
In the 2016 census, the locality of Kinbombi had a population of 37 people.

In the 2021 census, the locality of Kinbombi had a population of 34 people.

== Education ==
There are no schools in Kinbombi. The nearest government secondary schools are Goomeri State School in neighbouring Goomeri to the west and Kilkivan State School in Kilkivan to the north-east. Goomeri State School and Kilkivan State School both offer secondary schooling to Year 10. For secondary schooling to Year 12, the nearest government secondary schools are Murgon State High School in Murgon to the west and James Nash State High School in Gympie to the east.

== Attractions ==
The Kinbombi Falls picnic and camping area is 4 kilometres (2.5 mi) south of the Wide Bay Highway along Kinbombi Road.

The Kilkivan to Kingaroy Rail Trail follows the old railway line between the two towns. It is 88 kilometres (55 mi) long and passes through Goomeri, Murgon, Wondai, Tingoora, Wooroolin, Memerambi, and Crawford. The trail from Kilkivan to Murgon is unsealed. Queensland’s first and longest sealed rail trail section of 44 kilometres (27 mi) from Murgon to Kingaroy is for walkers and cyclists only. Short distances between towns means coffee is never far away. Kinbombi Siding is at the crest of the Coast Range. The Cinnabar to Kinbombi section crosses Kinbombi Creek (a high steel bridge).
