= Black Snake, Queensland =

Black Snake
- Suburb
- Interactive map of Black Snake
- Coordinates: 26.1858°S 152.2761°E
- Country: Australia
- State: Queensland
- LGA: Gympie Region
- Location: 21.0 km (13.0 mi) S of Kilkivan; 70.5 km (43.8 mi) W of Gympie; 249 km (155 mi) NNW of Brisbane

Government
  - State electorate: Nanango
  - Federal division: Wide Bay

Area
  - Total: 71.2 km^{2} (27.5 sq mi)

Population
  - Total: 88 (2021 census)
  - Density: 1.236/km^{2} (3.201/sq mi)
- Time zone: UTC+10:00 (AEST)
- Postcode: 4600
Suburbs around Black Snake
Cinnabar	Kilkivan	Kilkivan
Cinnabar	Black Snake	Oakview
Cinnabar	Wrattens Forest	Widgee

Black Snake is a rural locality in the Gympie Region, Queensland, Australia. In the 2021 census, Black Snake had a population of 88 people.

== Geography ==
The eastern and western boundaries of the locality follow mountain ridges. Most of the developed land is in the valley between them where Coppermine Creek rises and flows north, eventually becoming a tributary of Wide Bay Creek and ultimately the Mary River. The predominant land use is cattle grazing.

Some of the eastern parts of the locality are within the protected areas of Oakview National Park and Oakview Conservation Park.

The Wide Bay Highway forms part of the north-western boundary of the locality, entering from the north (Kilkivan) and exiting to the west (Cinnabar).

There are a number of mining leases in parts of locality with almost all in the southern part of the locality (approx 26.221°S 152.272°E); the minerals in this area are copper, silver, and gold.

== History ==
To mark World Environment Day on 5 June 2009, Queensland Minister for Climate Change and Sustainability, Kate Jones, announced the establishment of the Oakview National Park, consisting of 1,000 hectares (2,500 acres) which was formerly part of Oakview State Forest.

== Demographics ==
In the 2016 census, Black Snake had a population of 75 people.

In the 2021 census, Black Snake had a population of 88 people.

== Education ==
There are no schools in Black Snake. The nearest government primary school is Kilkivan State School in neighbouring Kilkivan to the north. The nearest government secondary schools are Kilkivan State School (to Year 10) and James Nash State High School (to Year 12) in Gympie.
