= Lower Wonga Solar Farm =

Lower Wonga
- Country: Australia
- Location: Lower Wonga, Queensland
- Status: Proposed
- Construction cost: $2billion
- Owner: SolarQ

Solar farm
- Type: Flat-panel PV
- Site area: 17 square kilometres (6.6 sq mi)

Power generation
- Nameplate capacity: 350 MW (Initial)

The Lower Wonga Solar Farm is a proposed photovoltaic power station, located in the rural locality of Lower Wonga, Gympie Region, Queensland, Australia. If the station is completed to its final configuration of 3 million solar panels capable of powering about 315,000 homes, it would become Australia's largest solar power station.

== Location ==
The Lower Wonga Solar Farm would be located on previously cleared lands used for grazing, on the corner of the Wide Bay Highway and Gympie Woolooga Road, Lower Wonga, Queensland. The farm site is also located next to the Woolooga Substation and transmission lines, providing a cheap and easy point to distribute power into the grid.
