= Lower Wonga =

- Suburb
- Interactive map of Lower Wonga
- Coordinates: 26.1052°S 152.4713°E
- Country: Australia
- State: Queensland
- LGA: Gympie Region
- Location: 31 km (19 mi) WNW of Gympie; 201 km (125 mi) N of Brisbane

Government
  - State electorate: Gympie
  - Federal division: Wide Bay

Area
  - Total: 97.5 km^{2} (37.6 sq mi)

Population
  - Total: 310 (2021 census)
  - Density: 3.18/km^{2} (8.23/sq mi)
- Time zone: UTC+10:00 (AEST)
- Postcode: 4570
Suburbs around Lower Wonga
Woolooga	Sexton	Sexton
Woolooga	Lower Wonga	Bells Bridge
Oakview	Widgee	Bells Bridge

Lower Wonga is a rural locality in the Gympie Region, Queensland, Australia. In the 2021 census, Lower Wonga had a population of 310 people.

== Geography ==
The locality is predominantly flat cleared freehold land (80–100 metres above sea level) used for grazing, apart from an unnamed peak of 450 metres in the far south-west of the locality. Widgee Creek (a tributary of the Mary River) meanders from south to north through the east part of the locality.

The Wide Bay Highway passes from east to west through the northern part of the locality.

== History ==
Wonga State School opened on 27 January 1914 and was renamed Wonga Lower State School in 1918. The school closed in 1968. The school building was relocated to Queen's Park in Gympie where it was used for Scout Cubs.

In April 2017, a company SolarQ announced plans to build the Lower Wonga Solar Farm, a photovoltaic power station. If the project achieves its final configuration of 3 million solar panels capable of powering about 315,000 homes, it would become Australia's largest solar power station.

== Demographics ==
In the 2011 census, Lower Wonga had a population of 498 people.

In the 2016 census, Lower Wonga had a population of 344 people.

In the 2021 census, Lower Wonga had a population of 310 people.

== Education ==
There are no schools in Lower Wonga. The nearest government primary schools are Woolooga State School in neighbouring Woolooga to the west, Widgee State School in neighbouring Widgee to the south, and Chatsworth State School in Chatsworth to the east. The nearest government secondary schools are Kilkivan State School (to Year 12) in Kilkivan to the west and James Nash State High School (to Year 12) in Gympie to the east.
