= Kilkivan to Kingaroy Rail Trail =

Rail trail in Queensland, Australia

The Kilkivan to Kingaroy Rail Trail (KKRT, in part also known as the South Burnett Rail Trail or SBRT) is an 88-kilometre (55 mi) recreation trail from Kilkivan to Kingaroy. The trail follows the old Kingaroy Branch railway and is open to walkers, cyclists and horse riders.

== Geography ==
Kilkivan is situated on the Wide Bay Highway, 229 kilometres (142 mi) north of the state capital, Brisbane and 50.4 kilometres (31.3 mi) west of Gympie.

Kingaroy is situated on the junction of the D'Aguilar and the Bunya Highways, 218 kilometres (135 mi) north-west of Brisbane and 141 kilometres (88 mi) south- west of Gympie.

=== Geology ===
The Trail crosses two belts of old rocks separated by the northern end of the Esk Basin. The Kilkivan Railway Station was built on a goldfield.

== Route ==
The northern end of the trail is located in Kilkivan, north-west of Brisbane and directly west of Gympie. The Kilkivan to Murgon section of the trail passes through Goomeri and is located in the upper reaches of the Mary River valley and crosses through open farmland. The trail head at Kilkivan is located opposite the former railway station building near the Bicentennial National Trail. Kilkivan is 216 kilometres (134 mi) from Brisbane (via the Wide Bay and Bruce Highways) or 273 kilometres (170 mi) via the Burnett, D'Aguilar and Bruce Highways. Kilkivan and Goomeri are located on the Wide Bay Highway.

The Kingaroy-Kilkivan Rail Trail joins the larger Bicentennial National Trail at Kilkivan.

The South Burnett Mountain Bike Club, in conjunction with the South Burnett Rail Trail Users Association, has established clear signposted cycling routes that loop out from the rail trail into the surrounding countryside:-East Memerambi Loop, Memerambi Gordonbrook Dam Route, Wooroolin West Loop, East Wooroolin Loop, West Tingoora Loop and East Tingoora Loop.

The 55-kilometre (34 mi) Link Trail joins the Brisbane Valley Rail Trail to the Kingaroy-Kilkivan Rail trail for a total distance of 305 kilometres (190 mi). The Link Trail follows the old stock route from Yarraman to Nanango for 21 kilometres (13 mi), and then from Nanango to Kingaroy is a further 34 kilometres (21 mi) along quiet country backroads. While they were open these two rail lines were never joined, hence the Link Trail is not a rail trail.

== Use ==
The section of the trail in the Gympie Regional Council area between Kilkivan and Murgon is for walking, cycling and horse riding only. The surface is not suitable for road/racing bicycles, personal mobility vehicles or horse-drawn vehicles. Motorised vehicles of any type are prohibited to keep trail users safe. The trail surface is compacted gravel (in populated areas) and grass (in rural areas) between Murgon and Kilkivan. Queensland’s longest sealed rail trail section of 44 kilometres (27 mi) from Murgon to Kingaroy in the South Burnett Region, is for walkers and cyclists only. In this section horse riding is not allowed, as the trail crosses the "tick line".

Most creeks are crossed via timber bridges or concrete causeways, the most notable of which is the restored curved trestle railway bridge at the rural town of Tingoora. After widespread criticism of the lack of a crossing at Wide Bay Creek near Kilkivan, Gympie Regional Council announced that $130,000 had been allocated to address the crossing and make other improvements along the trail by 30 June 2019. A low level bridge was opened across Wide Bay Creek in October 2021. There is another curved timber bridge between Cinnabar and Kinbombi. Old signage like W for Whistle can be seen along the trail.

Along the KKRT scattered amenities (rest stops, public toilets and shelters) are placed for user convenience. There are multiple free camping options located in the townships however camping along the trail itself is not permitted.

Use of the KKRT is governed by a Code of Conduct issued by the local governing authorities.

== Heritage listings ==
The following site on the closed Nanango railway line is on the Queensland Heritage Register:

- Dickabram Bridge: crosses the Mary River.

The following are Local Heritage listed by the South Burnett Regional Council:

- Kingaroy Railway Precinct: The former railway station, and a row of camphor laurel trees.
- Murgon Railway Complex and Corridor: The former railway station and station master’s residence, and what were a goods shed and platforms, and some railway tracks and the remains of the water tank stand.
- The Wondai Railway Complex: The former station master’s residence, railway station and platform, the weighbridge and loading platforms, and the remains of some railway tracks and goods sheds.

== Media ==
The rail trail is the focus of the South Burnett Rail Trail, QLD episode of Series 10 of the ABC programme Back Roads.

== Links ==
- Kilkivan to Kingaroy Rail Trail on Facebook
- Kilkivan to Kingaroy Rail Trail Guide
