= Oakview, Queensland =

Oakview
- Suburb
- Interactive map of Oakview
- Coordinates: 26.1205°S 152.3274°E
- Country: Australia
- State: Queensland
- LGA: Gympie Region
- Location: 8.3 km (5.2 mi) E of Kilkivan; 45.1 km (28.0 mi) WNW of Gympie; 212 km (132 mi) NNW of Brisbane

Government
  - State electorate: Nanango
  - Federal division: Wide Bay

Area
  - Total: 77.0 km^{2} (29.7 sq mi)

Population
  - Total: 45 (2021 census)
  - Density: 0.584/km^{2} (1.514/sq mi)
- Time zone: UTC+10:00 (AEST)
- Postcode: 4600
Suburbs around Oakview
Kilkivan	Woolooga	Woolooga
Kilkivan	Oakview	Lower Wonga
Black Snake	Black Snake	Widgee

Oakview is a rural locality in the Gympie Region, Queensland, Australia. It is a historic mining area and now grazing country. In the 2021 census, Oakview had a population of 45 people.

== Geography ==
The southern half and northern edge of Oakview are mountainous with lower flatter land in-between. The lower land has an elevation of 100–150 metres above sea level and is used for grazing. The northern edge contains Sugarloaf Mountain (340 metres above sea level) and is undeveloped land. The southern half rises to an unnamed peak at 630 metres above sea level and is part of the Oakview State Forest and the Oakview National Park.

Wide Bay Creek meanders from west to east through the northern flatter part of the locality; it is a tributary of the Mary River.

The railway line from Theebine to Nanango passes from east to west through the locality through the flatter land, but the line is no longer operating. Oakview was served by the Oakview railway station (26.07694°S 152.33111°E). The Wide Bay Highway runs from east to west through the flatter land to the south of the railway line.

== Ecology ==
The Oakview National Park contains a bottle tree (Brachychiton) scrub with two near-threatened flora: the giant ironwood Choricarpia subargentea and the Rhodamnia pauciovulata. It is also the habitat of the endangered gecko Phyllurus kabikabi and Nangur spiny skink Nangura spinosa.

== History ==
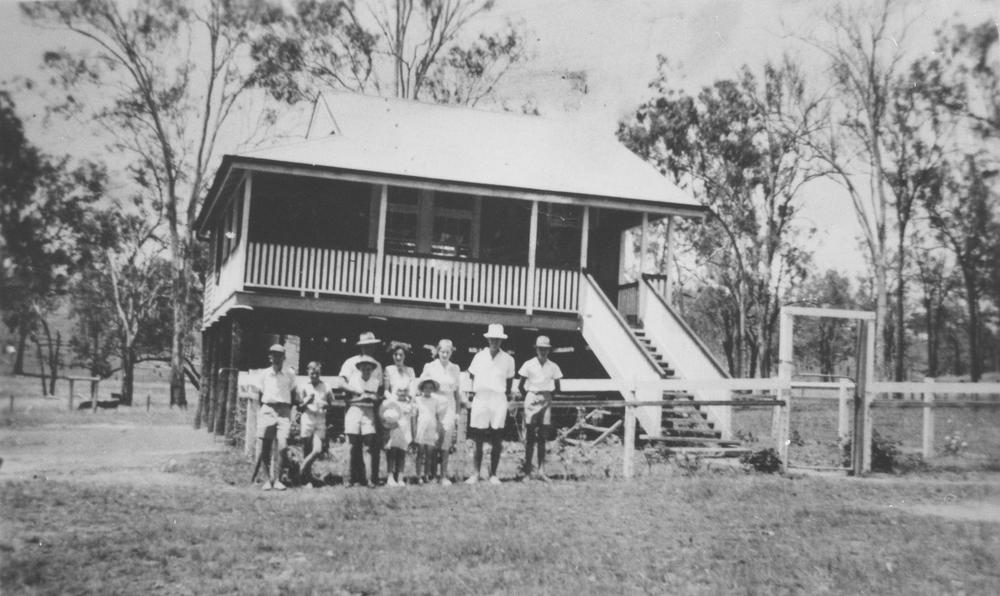
Tennis players standing outside Oakview State School, 1946

The Oakview Provisional School opened in 1895. It closed temporarily in 1901, reopening in 1902. In 1913, it became a half-time school, sharing its teacher with Running Creek Provisional School. In 1914, it resumed its full-time status but closed later that year. The school reopened as Oakview State School on 12 September 1918, but closed again in 1928. It reopened for the last time on 1 June 1937 as Oakview State School and closed permanently in 1963. It was on Oakview Road (26.09276°S 152.32215°E).

Oakview sawmill was operated by the Spencer Brothers from 1934 to 1971. It was located near the Oakview railway station (26.0800°S 152.3317°E).

In 2001, 3,490 hectares (8,600 acres) of Oakview State Forest was converted to Oakview Forest Reserve in order to converse its ecosystem. In 2009, 1,011 hectares (2,500 acres) of the forest reserve was converted to Oakview National Park while the other 2,479 hectares (6,130 acres) became a Resource Reserve to allow mining exploration (the south-western area of the locality having been mined for copper in the 1860s and 1870s). After the mining exploration was completed, the resource reserve land was added to the converted to national park.

== Demographics ==
In the 2016 census, Oakview had a population of 29 people.

In the 2021 census, Oakview had a population of 45 people.

== Heritage listings ==
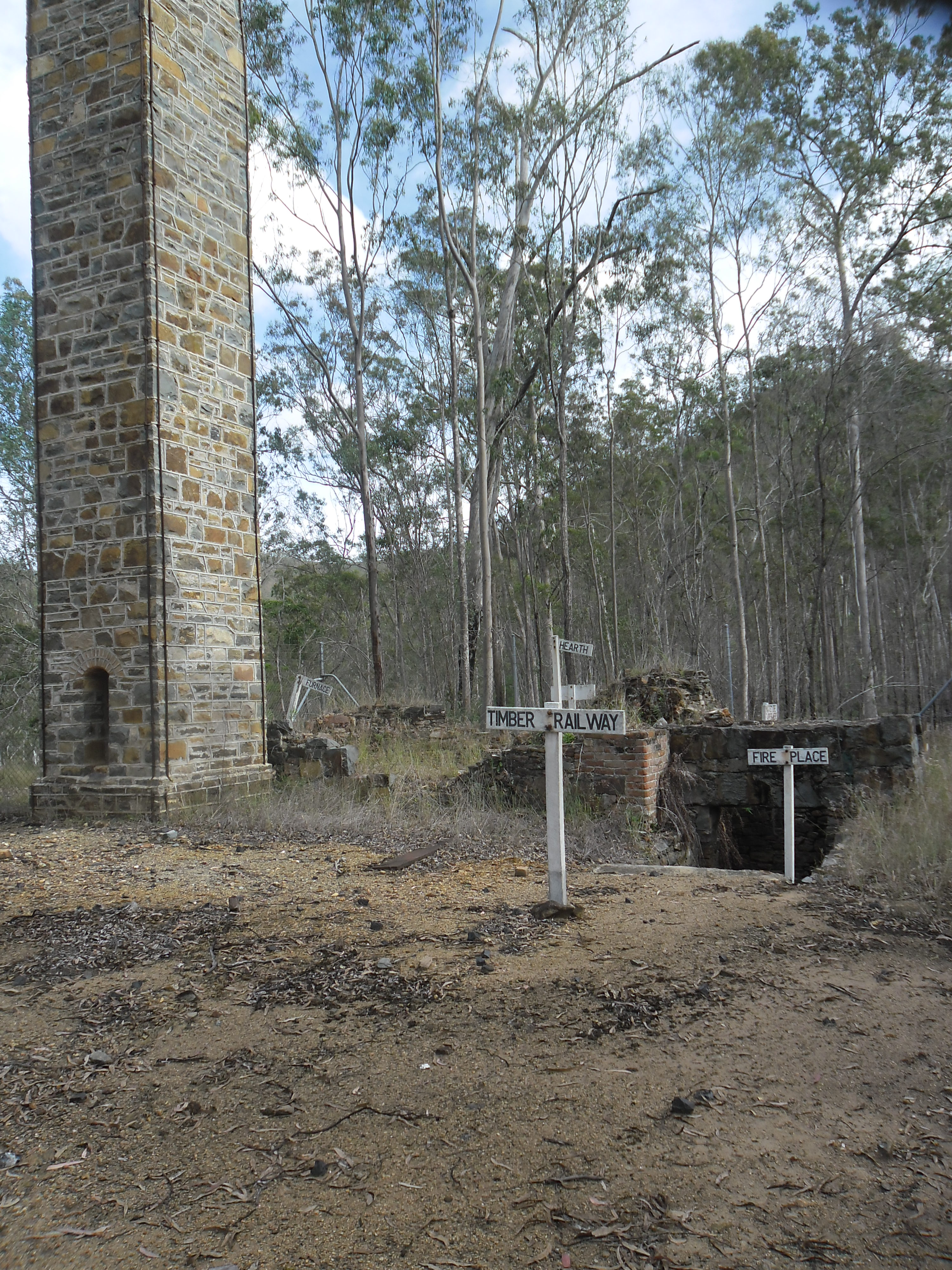
Mount Clara smelter and chimney, 2012

Oakview has the following heritage listings:

- Mount Clara smelter, Rossmore Road, in the upper reaches of Fat Hen Creek (26.1782°S 152.2726°E)

== Education ==
There are no schools in Oakview. The nearest government primary schools are Kilkivan State School in neighbouring Kilkivan to the west, Widgee State School in neighbouring Widgee to the south-east, and Woolooga State School in neighbouring Woolooga to the north-east. The nearest government secondary schools are Kilkivan State School (to Year 10) and James Nash State High School in Gympie to the east.

There are also non-government schools in Gympie and its suburbs.
