= Bells Bridge =

- Suburb
- Interactive map of Bells Bridge
- Coordinates: 26.1194°S 152.5361°E
- Country: Australia
- State: Queensland
- LGA: Gympie Region
- Location: 15.2 km (9.4 mi) NW of Gympie; 190 km (120 mi) N of Brisbane

Government
  - State electorate: Gympie
  - Federal division: Wide Bay

Area
  - Total: 52.4 km^{2} (20.2 sq mi)

Population
  - Total: 226 (2021 census)
  - Density: 4.313/km^{2} (11.17/sq mi)
- Time zone: UTC+10:00 (AEST)
- Postcode: 4570
Suburbs around Bells Bridge
| Lower Wonga | Sexton | Curra |
| Lower Wonga | Bells Bridge | Chatsworth |
| Widgee | Glastonbury | Fishermans Pocket |

Bells Bridge is a rural locality in the Gympie Region, Queensland, Australia. In the 2021 census, Bells Bridge had a population of 226 people.

== Geography ==
The Bruce Highway passes through the locality from the east to the north-east, where it has a junction with the Wide Bay Highway which passes through the location to the north-west.

The Mary River flows through the locality from south-east to north-east, eventually flowing into the Great Sandy Strait.

Most of the locality is the Brooyar State Forest, except for the eastern and north-eastern parts which are farmland supporting cropping and grazing.

== History ==
The locality presumably takes its name from the Bell's Bridge built at O'Leary's Crossing over the Mary River, which was opened by the Minister for Lands, Joshua Thomas Bell, on Thursday 28 May 1908. The bridge was funded by the Widgee and Kilkivan Shire Councils, the Queensland Government and other public donations. It was named after Bell for the support he had given them in obtaining the funding for the bridge.

Bell's Bridge State School opened on 8 June 1926. It closed on 11 November 1932.

Bells Bridge was a locality in the Shire of Cooloola prior to the 2008 amalgamation into the Gympie Region.

== Demographics ==
In the 2016 census, Bells Bridge had a population of 197 people.

In the 2021 census, Bells Bridge had a population of 226 people.

== Education ==
There are no schools in Bells Bridge. The nearest government primary schools are Chatsworth State School in neighbouring Chatsworth to the east and Widgee State School in neighbouring Widgee to the south-west. The nearest government secondary school is James Nash State High School in Gympie to the south-east.
