= Goomeri =

- Town
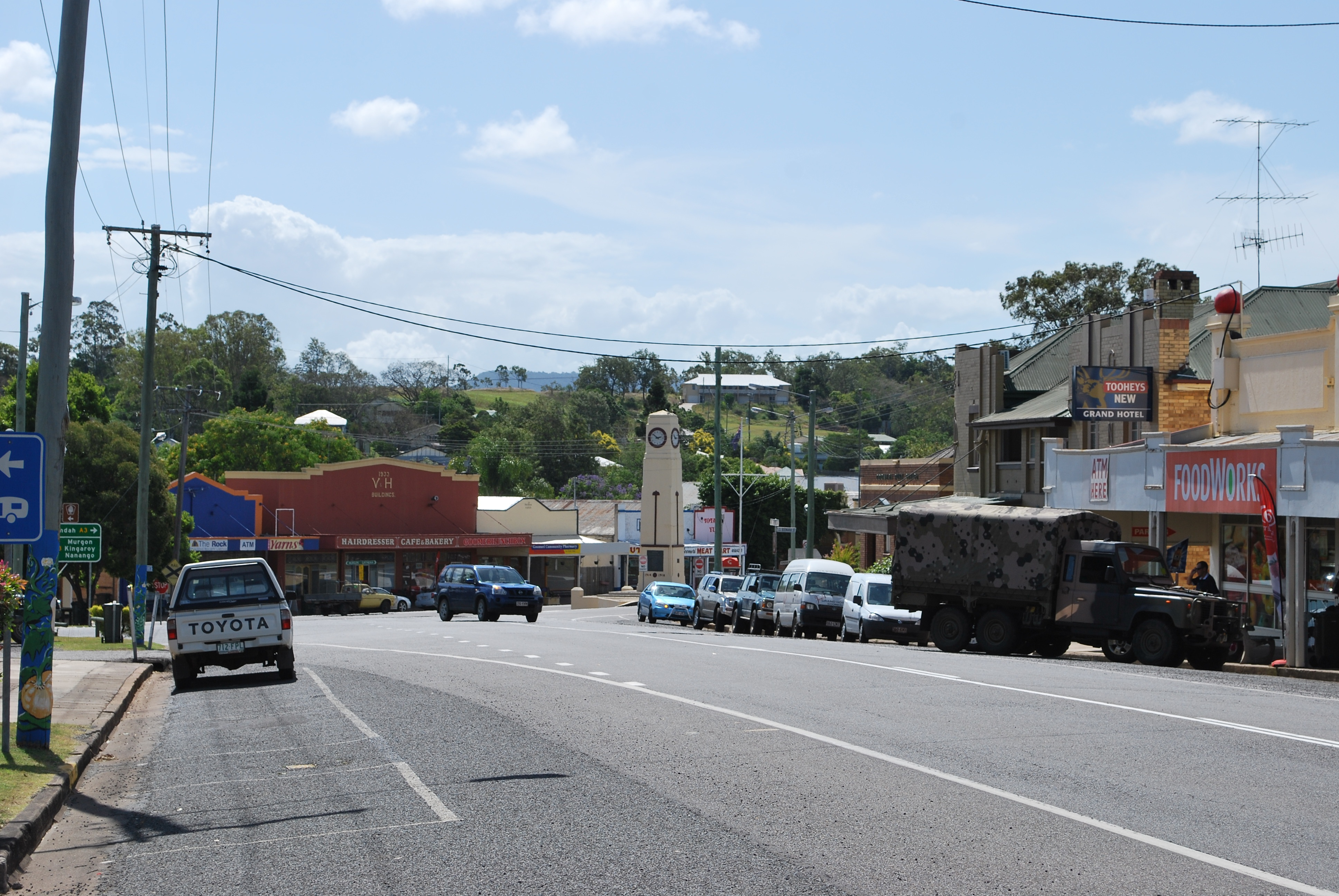
- Goomeri looking towards the war memorial

- Interactive map of Goomeri
- Coordinates: 26.1825°S 152.0680°E
- Country: Australia
- State: Queensland
- LGA: Gympie Region
- Location: 16.9 km (10.5 mi) NE of Murgon; 75.8 km (47.1 mi) W of Gympie; 241 km (150 mi) NW of Brisbane
- Established: 1911

Government
  - State electorate: Nanango
  - Federal division: Wide Bay

Area
  - Total: 106.2 km^{2} (41.0 sq mi)

Population
  - Total: 677 (2021 census)
  - Density: 6.375/km^{2} (16.511/sq mi)
- Time zone: UTC+10:00 (AEST)
- Postcode: 4601
Localities around Goomeri
| Goomeribong | Boonara | Cinnabar |
| Manyung | Goomeri | Kinbombi |
| Moondooner; Redgate | Barambah | Kinbombi |

Goomeri (/ɡuːˈmɛri/ goo-MERR-ee) is a rural town and locality in the Gympie Region, Queensland, Australia. In the 2021 census, the locality of Goomeri had a population of 677 people.

== Geography ==
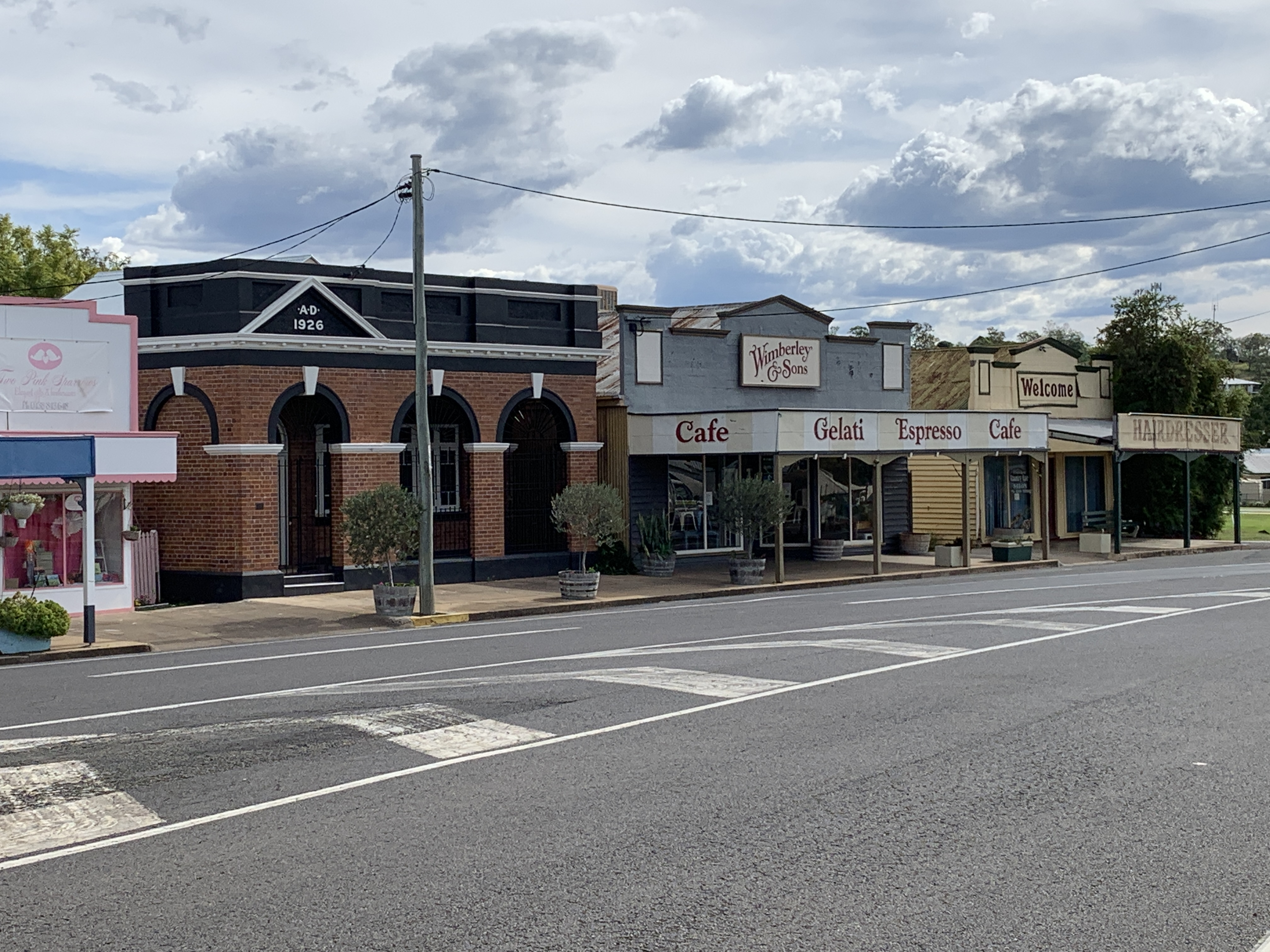
Streetscape of the Burnett Highway (Moore Street), 2019

The town is located on the intersection of the Burnett, Bunya and Wide Bay Highways, 255 kilometres (158 mi) from the state capital, Brisbane.

The main street is Moore Street; the Burnett Highway follows Moore Street through the town.

Goomeri lies 16 kilometres (9.9 mi) west of the Coast Range.

== History ==
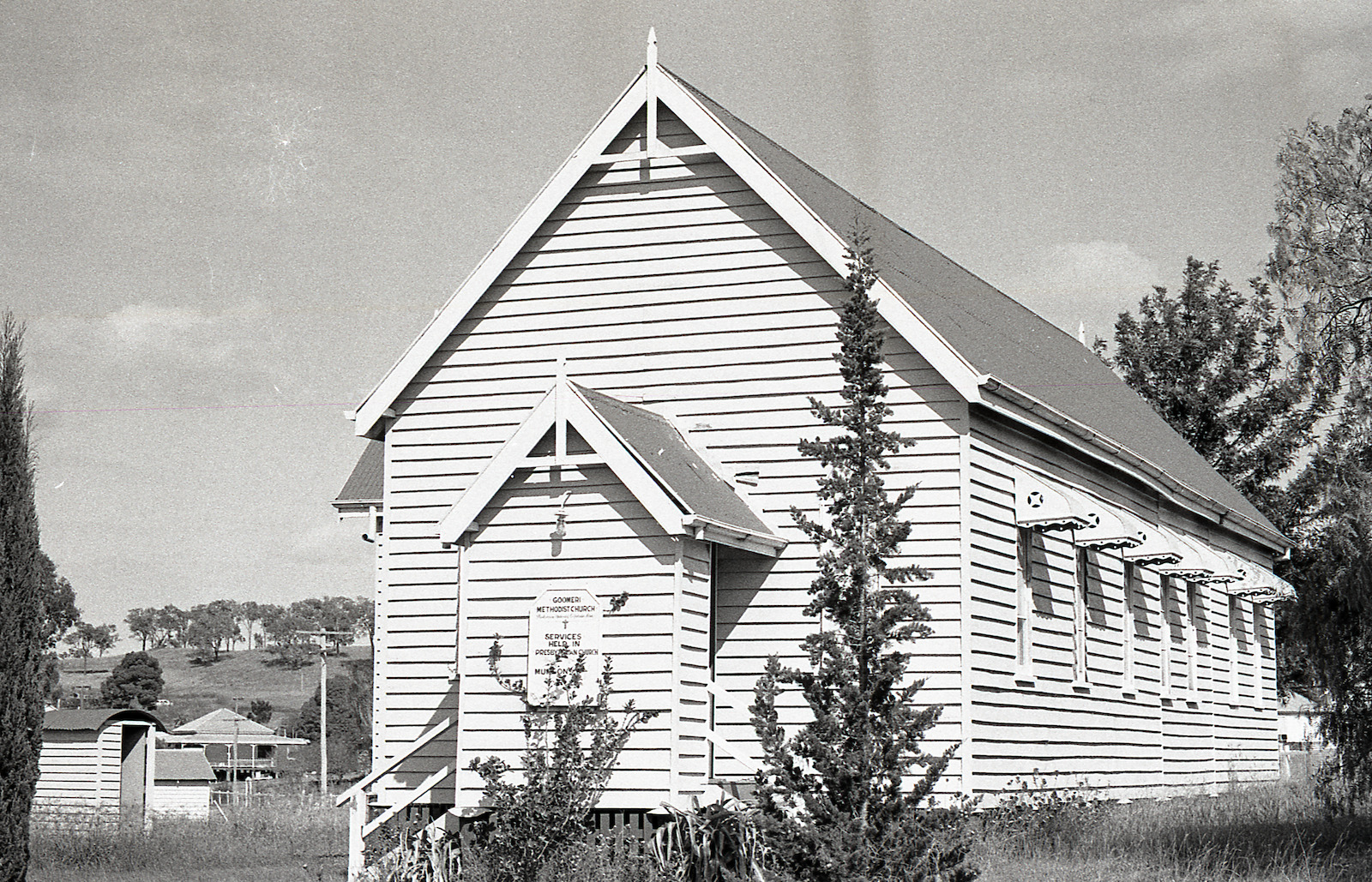
Goomeri Methodist Church, 1975

European settlement in the Goomeri area began in 1846 with the establishment of Booubyjan Homestead and Boonara Station.

The Kilkivan to Goomeri section of the Nanango railway line opened in 1902, and the Goomeri to Wondai section opened on 14 September 1903. The line was officially closed in early 2010.

Closer settlement took place in 1911 with the sale of rural allotments and town blocks.

Goomeri Post Office opened by June 1912 (a receiving office had been open from 1902).

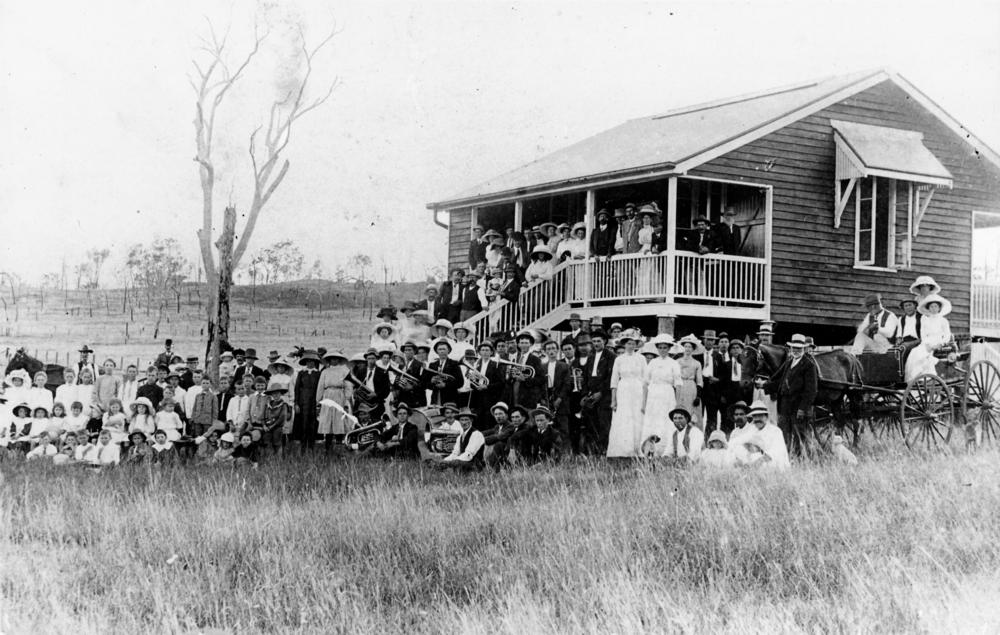
Opening of Goomeri State School, 1912

Goomeri Provisional School opened on 5 February 1912. In 1913, it became Goomeri State School.

Goomeri Methodist Church opened on 30 August 1912. It closed in January 2014 and is now used as a house. It was at 10 Mactaggart Street (26.1772°S 152.0652°E).

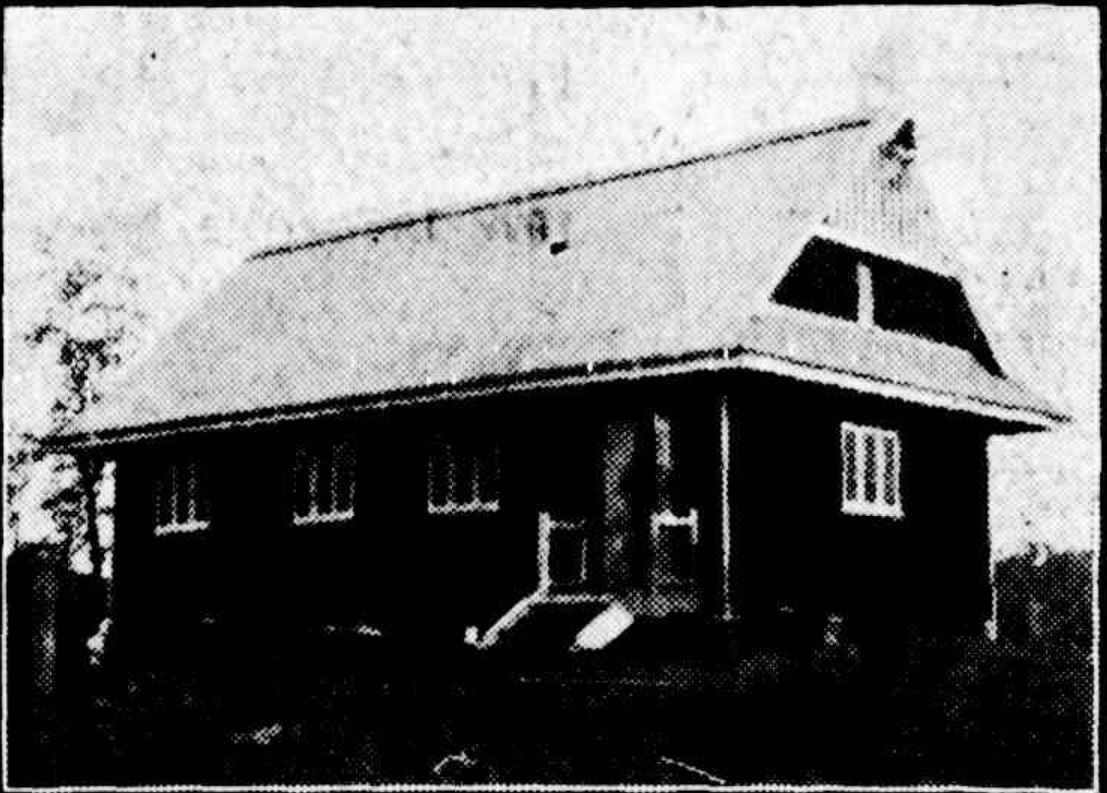
Anglican Church of the Epiphany, Goomeri, at the time of its opening, 1916

The Anglican Church of the Epiphany was dedicated on 12 March 1916 by Archbishop St Clair Donaldson.

On Sunday 21 March 1920, St Kevin's Catholic Church was officially opened and blessed by Archbishop James Duhig. The church building had been relocated from Nanango, where it was originally opened in 1901.

On 15 November 1940, the Goomeri War Memorial Clock was unveiled by the State President of the RSL, Raymond Huish.

Goomeri Library opened in 1986.

Circa 1997, the Apostolic Church at 103 Wittenberg Road, Tansey, was relocated to 19 Olive Street in Goomeri. It originally opened in Tansey on 26 September 1926 by Reverend W. Neimeyer.

== Demographics ==
In the 2016 census, the locality of Goomeri had a population of 664 people. Of these 49.4% were male and 50.6% were female. Aboriginal and/or Torres Strait Islander people made up 8.7% of the population. The most common ancestries in Goomeri were Australian 34.6%, English 30.3%, Irish 7.1%, German 7.1% and Scottish 6.4%.

In the 2021 census, the locality of Goomeri had a population of 677 people.

== Heritage listings ==
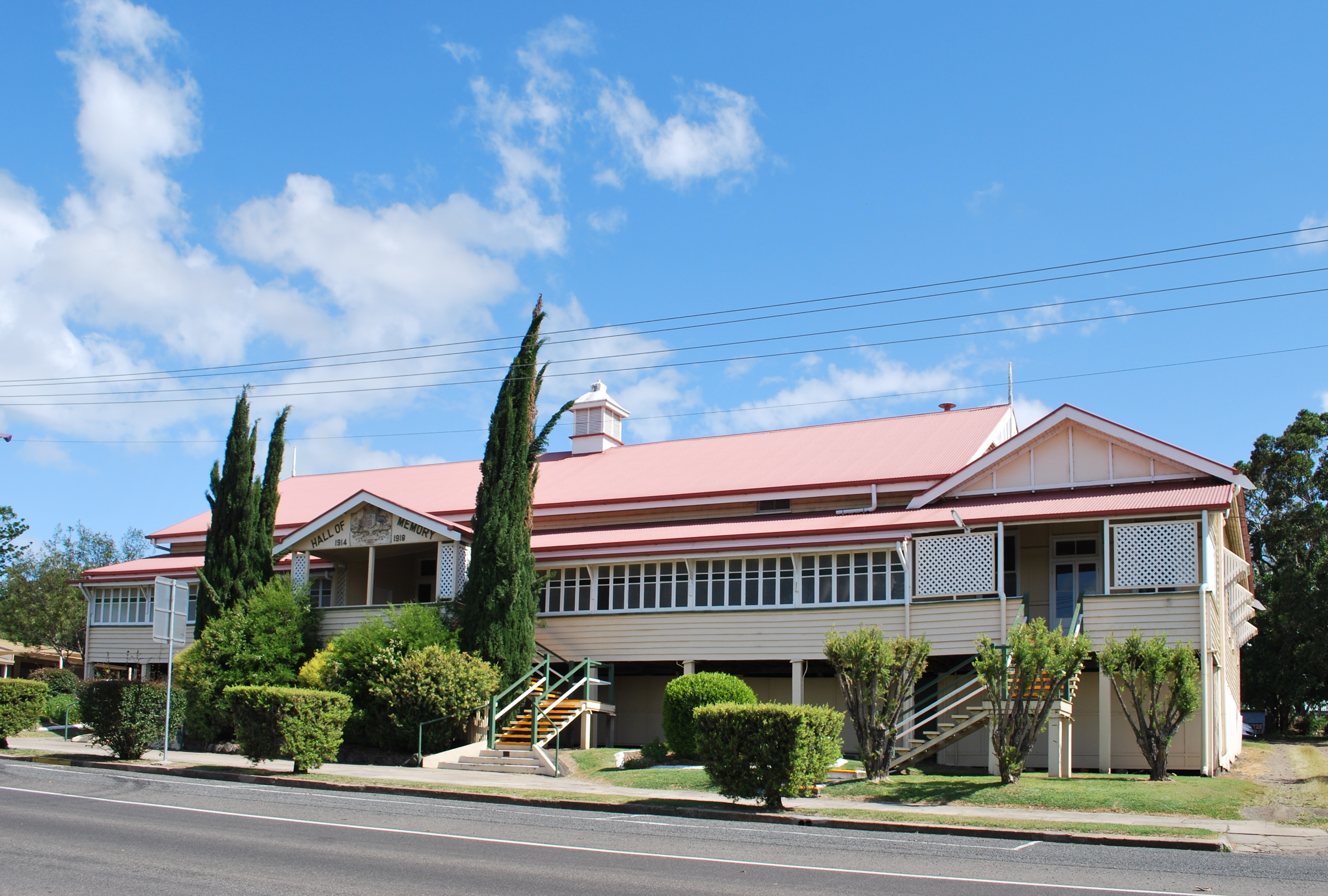
Hall of Memory

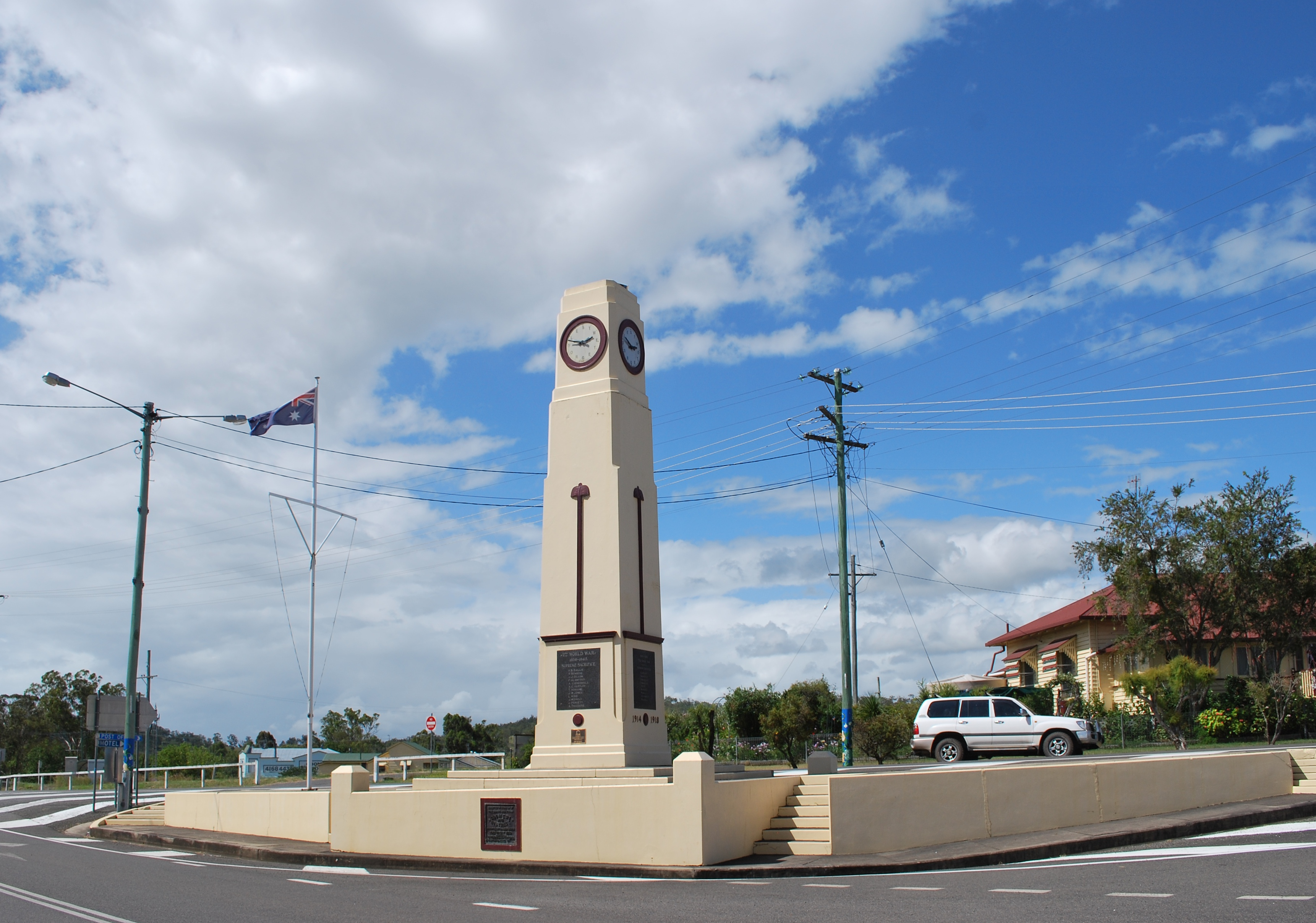
Goomeri War Memorial, 2010

Goomeri has a number of heritage-listed sites, including:

- Goomeri Hall of Memory, Boonara Street (26.1831°S 152.0702°E)
- Goomeri War Memorial Clock, Burnett Highway (26.1823°S 152.0681°E)
- Barambah Homestead, Goomeri Road, Barambah

== Education ==
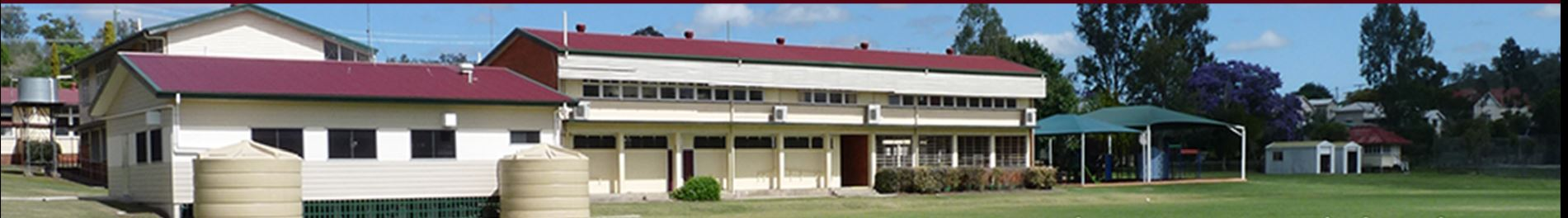
Goomeri State School, 2024

Goomeri State School is a government primary and secondary (Prep–10) school for boys and girls at 5 Munro Street (26.1796°S 152.0648°E). In 2018, the school had an enrolment of 146 students with 19 teachers (17 full-time equivalent) and 12 non-teaching staff (9 full-time equivalent).

There is no secondary school offering education to Year 12 in Goomeri; the nearest government secondary school offering education to Year 12 is Murgon State High School in Murgon to the south-west.

== Amenities ==
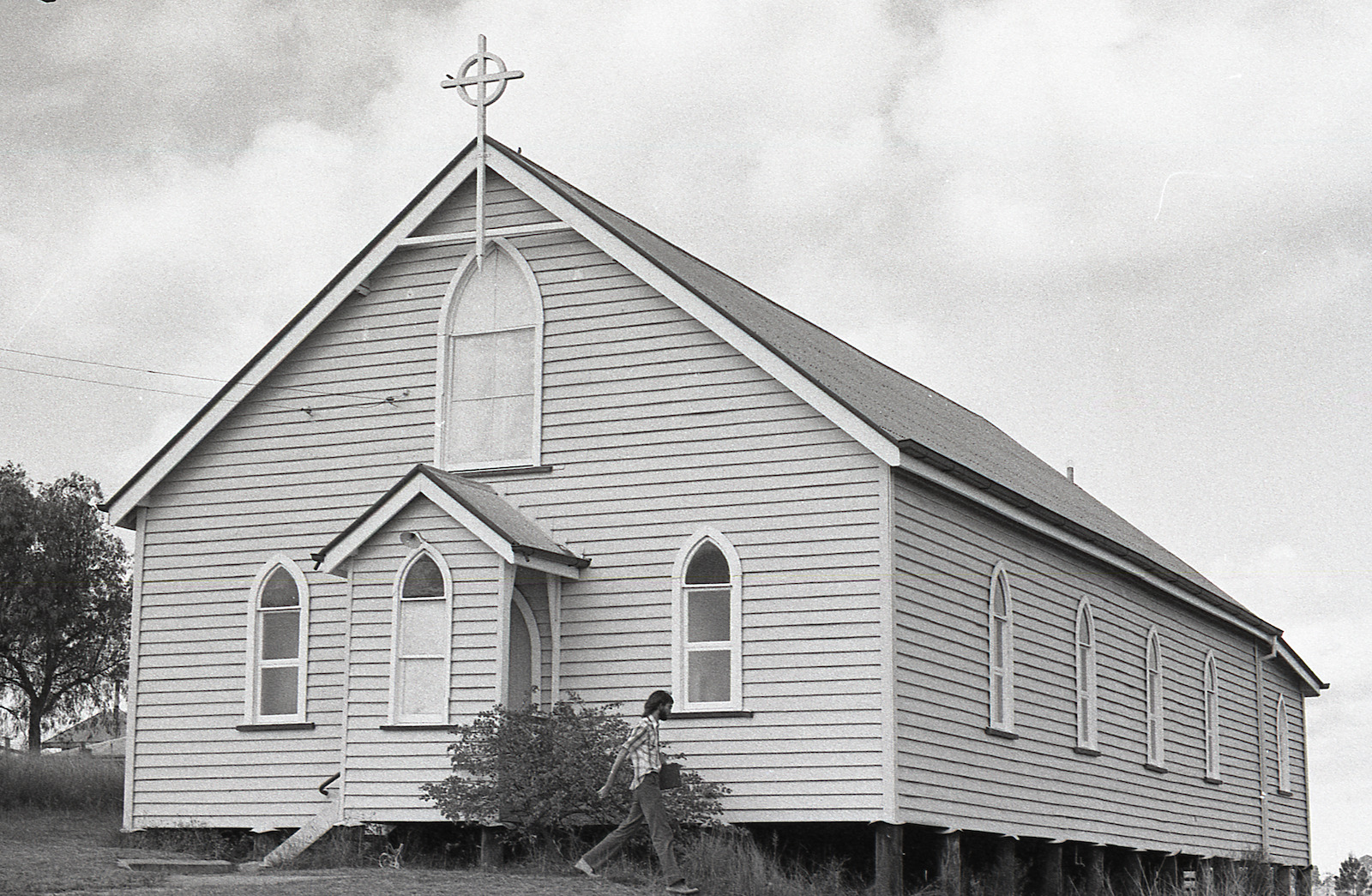
St Kevin's Catholic Church, 1975

Goomeri has a library at 35 Moore Street (26.1817°S 152.0674°E) operated by the Gympie Regional Council.

The Anglican Church of Epiphany is at 9–11 Hodge Street (26.1843°S 152.0707°E).

St Kevin's Catholic Church is at 17 Hodge Street (26.1842°S 152.0713°E).

The Apostolic Church is at 19 Olive Street (26.1796°S 152.0628°E).

Goomeri Bowls Club is at 57 Moore Street.

Goomeri has a Swimming Pool with advertised opening hours.

== Attractions ==
With parks and a number of buildings built in the 1920s, Goomeri is a quiet place that is known for its "relaxed old world charm". Goomeri's Hall of Memory – still in use today – was built in 1926 and is now a heritage-listed building.

The town is also well known for its gourmet food. Goomeri offers fine dining, country food, gourmet cheeses and locally grown olives to award winning pies. Goomeri is a gateway to the South Burnett wine district, with vineyards and cellar doors within proximity. Other industries in the area include beef and dairy.

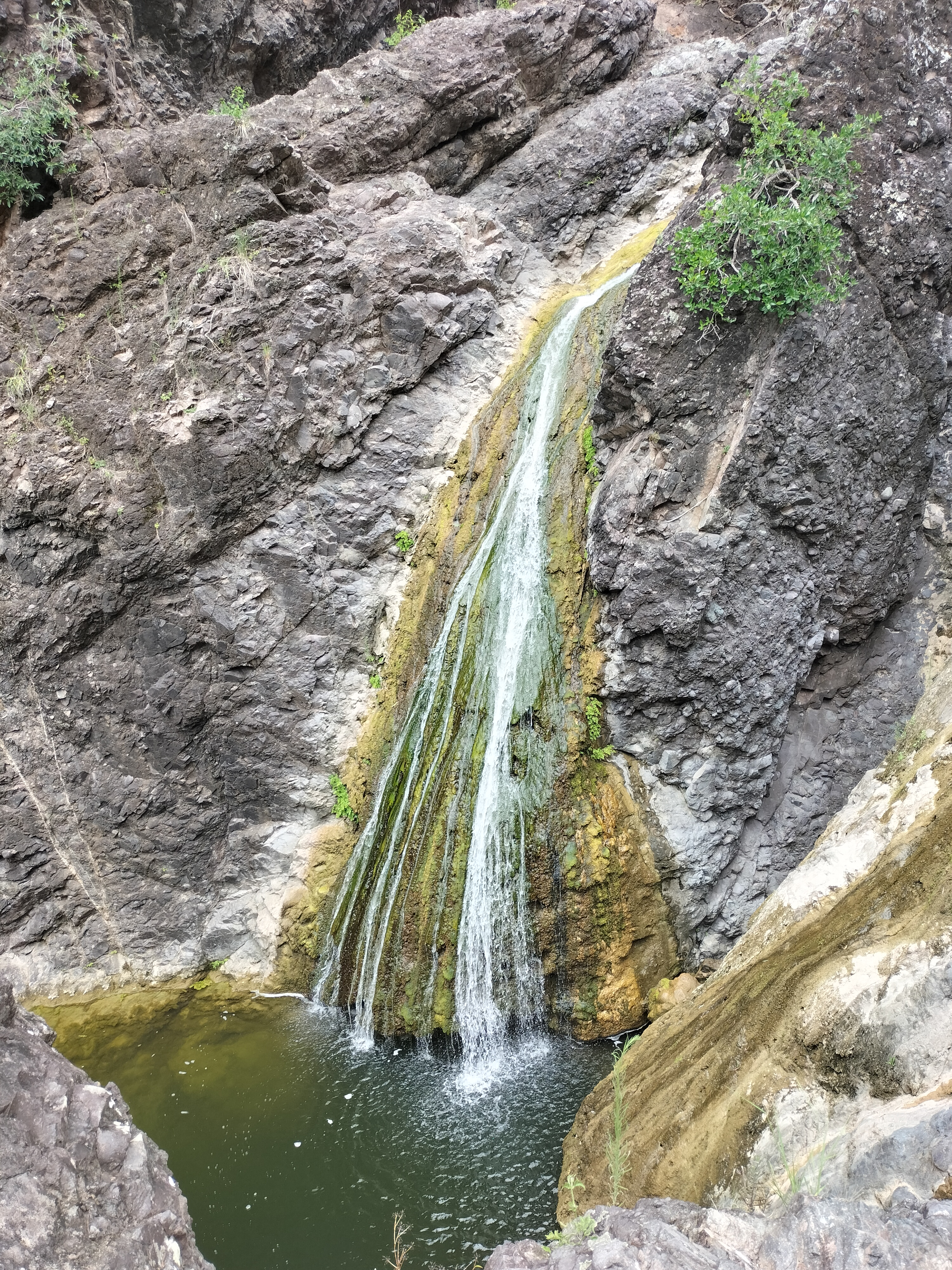
Kinbombi Falls

Goomeri’s information centre is situated at 41 Moore Street (Burnett Highway, 26.1839°S 152.0685°E), beside the windmill at Lions Park.

Goomeri also has an hotel and an art studio.

The Kinbombi Falls picnic and camping area is 4 kilometres (2.5 mi) south of the Wide Bay Highway along Kinbombi Road, and 10.5 kilometres (6.5 mi) from Goomeri. A walking track leads to a deep natural pool. A track skirts the top of the gorge, offering views of the area.

The Kilkivan to Kingaroy Rail Trail follows the old railway line between the two towns. It is 88 kilometres (55 mi) long and passes through Goomeri, Murgon, Wondai, Tingoora, Wooroolin, Memerambi, and Crawford. The trail from Kilkivan to Murgon is unsealed. Queensland’s first and longest sealed rail trail section of 44 kilometres (27 mi) from Murgon to Kingaroy is for walkers and cyclists only. Short distances between towns means coffee is never far away.

== Events ==
The Goomeri Pumpkin Festival, held on the last Sunday in May each year, attracts up to 14,000 visitors each year. The highlight of the Pumpkin Festival is the "Great Australian Pumpkin Roll" down Policeman's Hill.
