= Nanango railway line =

Former railway line in Queensland, Australia

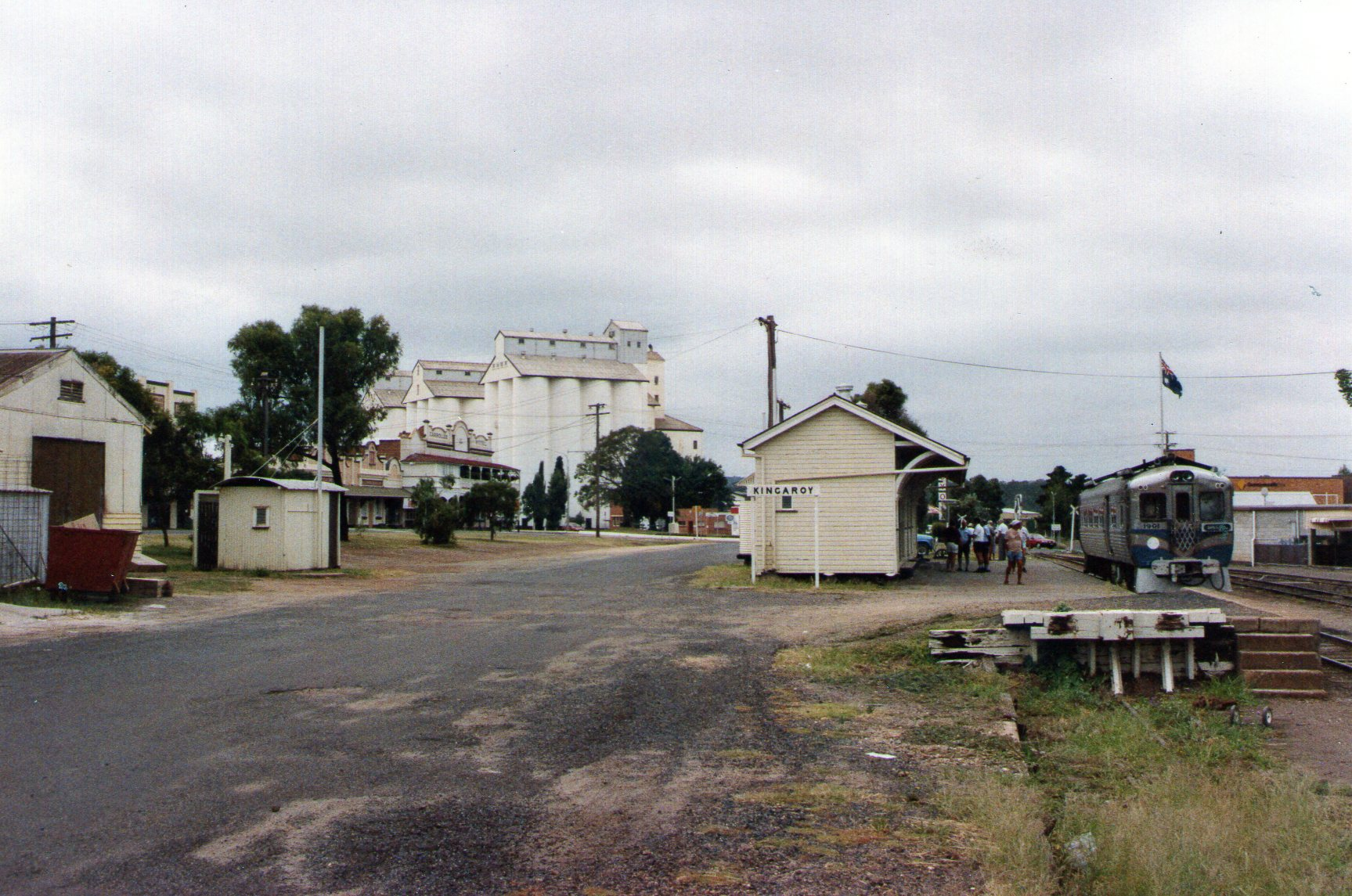
- RM 1901 at Kingaroy station, c.1991

Overview
- Locale: Queensland, Australia
- Termini: Theebine Junction; Nanango

History
- Commenced: 31 October 1882
- Opened: 1 January 1886
- Completed: 13 November 1911
- Closed: 2011

Technical
- Track gauge: 3 ft 6 in (1,067 mm)

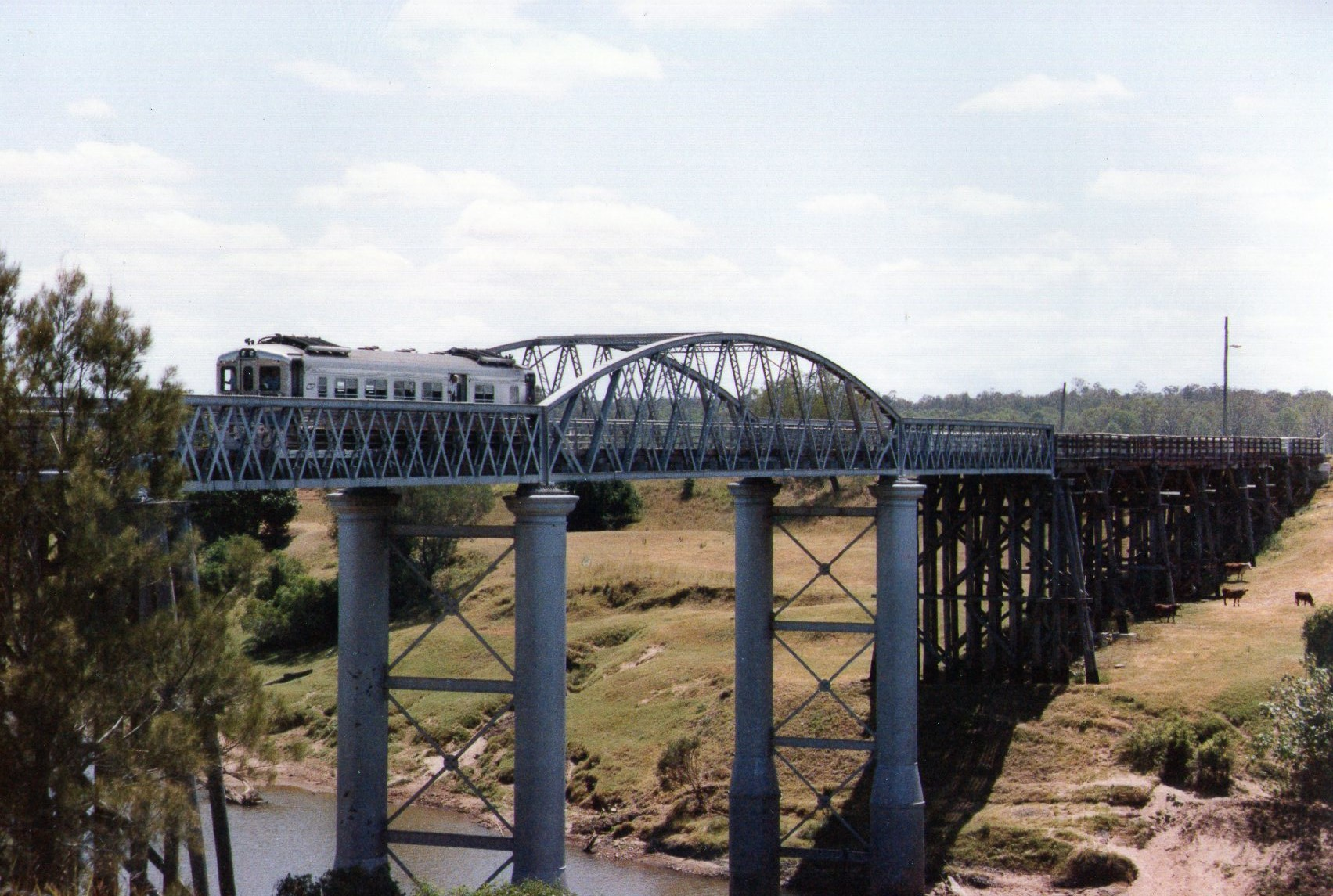
RM 1901 crossing the Dickabram Bridge c.1991

The Nanango railway line was a narrow-gauge branch railway located in Queensland, Australia. On 31 October 1882, parliament approved the construction of a branch line from Theebine (then called Kilkivan Junction) west to Kilkivan after gold and copper were discovered in this region of Queensland, Australia. The section was opened in two stages – to Dickabram on 1 January 1886 after two crossings of the Mary River and to Kilkivan on 6 December 1886.

Parliament approved an extension of the line south west to what became Kingaroy on 12 December 1900. The decision served to revitalise the previously unprofitable line, but such an indirect link with Brisbane faced stiff competition once roads were constructed direct from the area south east to the state's capital. Initially, as in many other places, railway construction forged the development of settlements along its path – in this instance Goomeri, Murgon, Wondai and Kingaroy townships were thus established.

== To Dickabram ==
A daily goods train left Maryborough at 8.00am for Dickabram and returned in the afternoon making a crossing over the Mary River on Dickabram Bridge which was built to carry road and rail traffic.

== To Kilkivan ==
The second stage to Kilkivan took the line through stops at Dickabram, Miva, Sexton, Boowoogum, Woolooga, Nondiga, Oakview, Bular and Mouingba. A mixed train ran each day from Maryborough to Kilkivan departing the former town at 6.00am reaching Kilkivan at 1.45pm before returning to Maryborough at 4.45pm.

== To Goomeri ==
The third stage from Kilkivan to Goomeri opened on 1 August 1902 and stops were built en route at Wygarr, Cinnabar, Coleman and Kinbombi.

== To Wondai ==
Opened on 14 September 1903, the fourth stage took the line further south to Wondai after passing through Manyung, Moondooner and Murgon.

== To Kingaroy ==
The fifth stage, opened on 19 December 1904, terminated at Kingaroy which was soon to become the most important town in the South Burnett region. En route from Wondai, the line passed sidings at Tingoora, Wooroolin, Memerambi and Crawford.

The train service from Brisbane to Kingaroy was not quick to say the least. Leaving Brisbane at 8.00am on the Bundaberg Mail and travelling north to meet the train travelling west meant arrival in Kingaroy at 9.45pm. A rail motor service ran three times a week between Maryborough and Kingaroy from 1929 to 1967, and a sleeping car was provided twice per week.

== To Nanango ==
The sixth and final stage opened as far as Nanango on 13 November 1911 passing through Edenvale, Hornley, Coolabunia, Hodgleigh and Darli. By 1914, timber and agricultural traffic necessitated a twice daily service to Nanango and a trip to Brisbane ran overnight. Railheads at Nanango and Yarraman (Brisbane Valley branch terminus) were no more than 20 kilometres (12 mi) apart yet proposed links did not eventuate.

== Partial closure ==
The Kingaroy to Nanango section of the line was closed on 1 July 1964 and dismantled. The remainder of the line was left open but had limited use. The Peanut Company of Australia used the line to transport peanuts to and from its Kingaroy factory.

== Full closure ==
The Kingaroy-Theebine section of the railway was closed in 2011.

== Tourism ==
The Theebine to Kingaroy line was officially closed in early 2011. Track removal occurred in 2014 making way for the 88 kilometres (55 mi) Kingaroy-Kilkivan Rail Trail. Rail bridges along the route were dismantled. The Kilkivan to Kingaroy Rail Trail is a joint project between Gympie Regional Council, South Burnett Regional Council and the Queensland State Government to deliver a publicly accessible shared use recreational trail as a viable re-use of a now disused rail corridor. Bitumen has also been laid on the section of the trail between Kingaroy and Murgon.

== Heritage listings ==
The following is on the Queensland Heritage Register:-

- Dickabram Bridge, across the Mary River

The following are Local Heritage listed by the South Burnett Regional Council:-

- Kingaroy Railway Precinct:- The former railway station, and a row of camphor laurel trees.
- Murgon Railway Complex and Corridor:- The former railway station and station master’s residence, what was previously a goods shed, platforms, some railway tracks and the remains of the water tank stand.
- The Wondai Railway Complex:- The former station master’s residence, railway station and platform, the weighbridge and loading platforms, and the remains of some railway tracks and goods sheds.
- Nanango Railway Complex:- The former station master’s house, a high level platform and a dam.
- Proston Railway Complex:- The former railway station.
