= Goomeri War Memorial Clock =

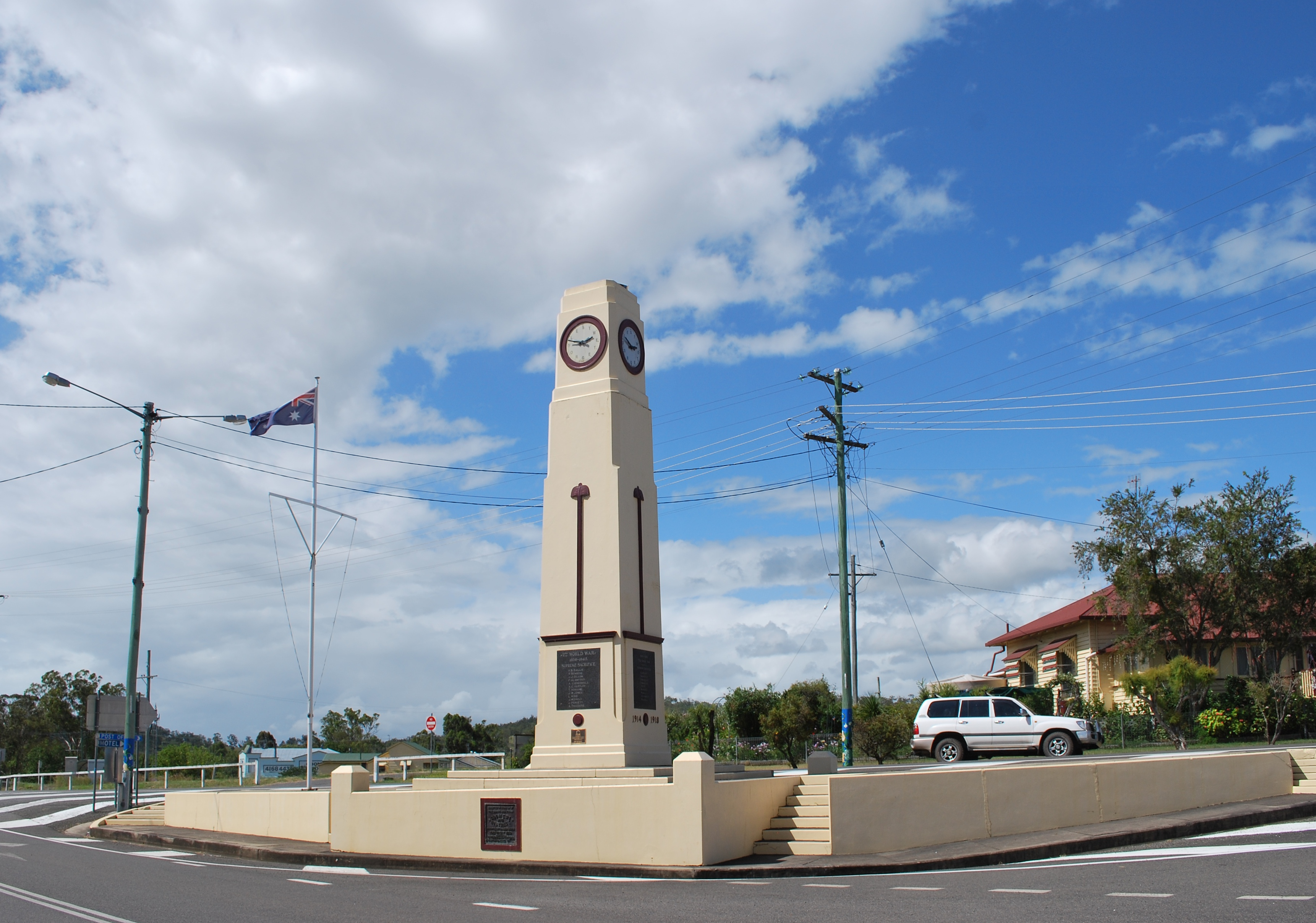
- Goomeri War Memorial, 2010

- Location within Queensland Location within Australia
- 26.1823°S 152.0681°E
- Location: Burnett Highway, Goomeri, Gympie Region, Queensland, Australia

History
- Design period: 1939–1945 (World War II)
- Built: 1940

Queensland Heritage Register
- Official name: Goomeri War Memorial Clock
- Type: state heritage (built)
- Designated: 21 October 1992
- Reference no.: 600642
- Significant period: 1940– (social); 1940 (historical); 1940 (fabric)
- Significant components: memorial surrounds/railings, memorial – clock tower, flagpole/flagstaff
- Builders: Ernest Gunderson

Goomeri War Memorial Clock is a heritage-listed memorial at Burnett Highway, Goomeri, Gympie Region, Queensland, Australia. It was built in 1940. It was added to the Queensland Heritage Register on 21 October 1992.

== History ==
The Goomeri War Memorial Clock was unveiled on 15 November 1940 by RSL State President Raymond Douglas Huish. The concrete memorial honours the 9 local men who fell in the First World War and the 12 who fell in the Second World War. Goomeri Memorial Clock Tower was unveiled with the names of the local men who died in service or killed in action during the First World War. The names of those killed in the Second World War were added later. It was erected at a cost of £700 which was raised by the Goomeri Returned Services League Sub-Branch.

Australia, and Queensland in particular, had few civic monuments before the First World War. The memorials erected in its wake became our first national monuments, recording the devastating impact of the war on a young nation. Australia lost 60 000 from a population of about 4 million, representing one in five of those who served. No previous or subsequent war has made such an impact on the nation.

Even before the end of the war, memorials became a spontaneous and highly visible expression of national grief. To those who erected them, they were as sacred as grave sites, substitute graves for the Australians whose bodies lay in battlefield cemeteries in Europe and the Middle East. British policy decreed that the Empire war dead were to be buried where they fell. The word "cenotaph", commonly applied to war memorials at the time, literally means "empty tomb".

Australian war memorials are distinctive in that they commemorate not only the dead. Australians were proud that their first great national army, unlike other belligerent armies, was composed entirely of volunteers, men worthy of honour whether or not they made the supreme sacrifice. Many memorials honour all who served from a locality, not just the dead, providing valuable evidence of community involvement in the war. Such evidence is not readily obtainable from military records, or from state or national listings, where names are categorised alphabetically or by military unit.

Australian war memorials are also valuable evidence of imperial and national loyalties, at the time, not seen as conflicting; the skills of local stonemasons, metalworkers and architects; and of popular taste. In Queensland, the digger statue was the popular choice of memorial, whereas the obelisk predominated in the southern states, possibly a reflection of Queensland's larger working-class population and a lesser involvement of architects. Many of the First World War monuments have been updated to record local involvement in later conflicts, and some have fallen victim to unsympathetic re-location and repair.

Although many different types of war memorials were erected throughout Queensland, the clock type of memorial was comparatively rare. It is not known who designed the memorial; however the metal work was produced by Ernest Gunderson and was originally part of an earlier monument which also commemorated the First World War. Gunderson established his metalworking company in Brisbane after migrating from Norway. The company operated until the mid 1930s and supplied honour boards and plates for memorials statewide. His work was distinctly original, often incorporating both Australian and British motifs. The monument is painted, with details now picked out in darker colours.

== Description ==
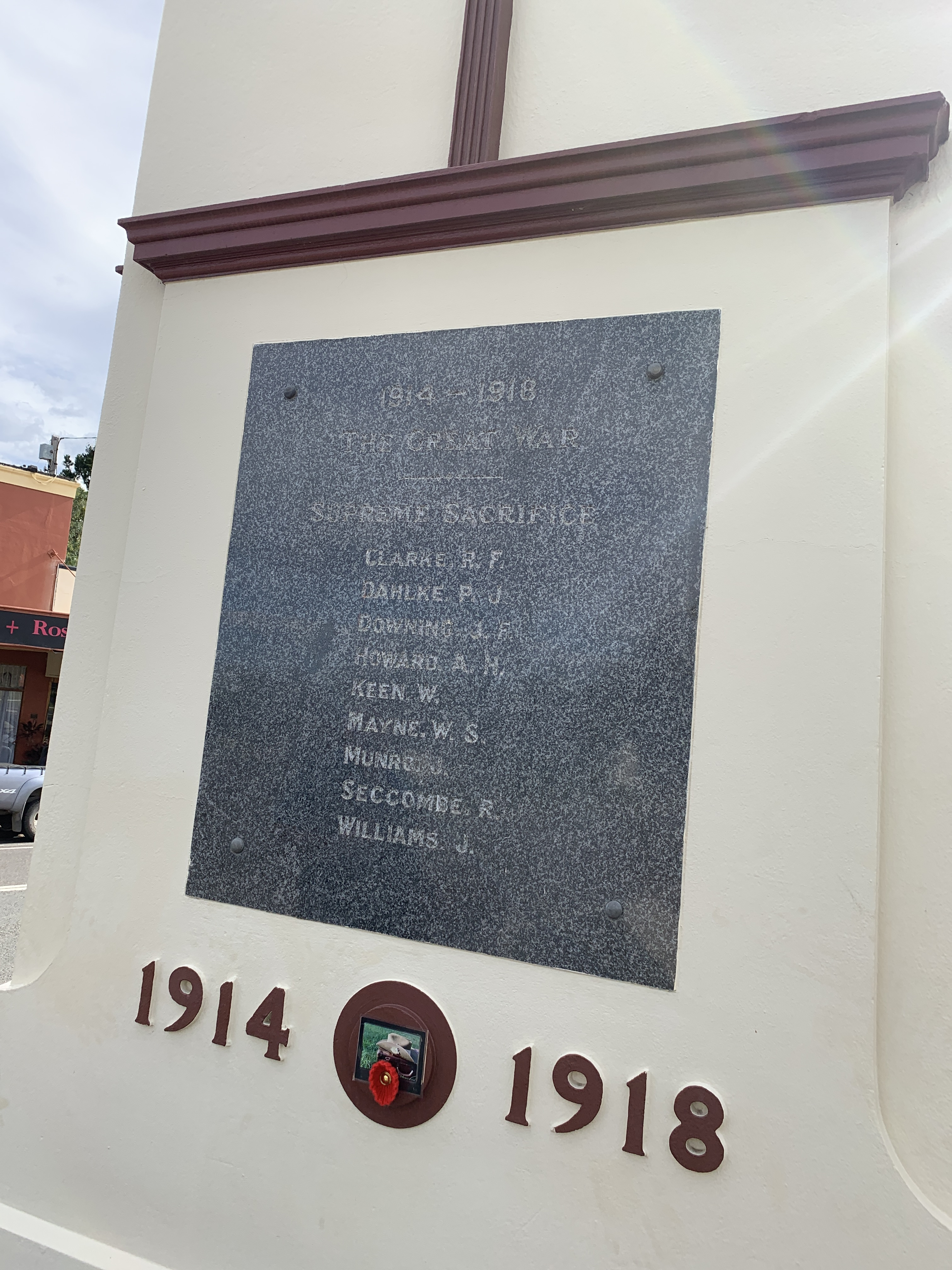
World War I list of deaths, 2019

The First World War Memorial is situated in a traffic island in one of the main intersections of Goomeri. It is a dominant landscape feature from most locations in the town. The traffic island is located in the centre of the intersection, level with the road on the eastern side and dropping away on the western side. A flagpole is located on the north side of the monument which sits on a stepped concrete pad with short square concrete bollards at each corner.

The painted concrete monument rises to a height of 74 feet (23 m) and comprises a tapered tower with clockfaces at the apex. Fixed to the west face of the foundation and to the north face of the clocktower are metal components from Goomeri's former memorial to the First World War. The tower is subtly divided into three sections: a base, the body and the clock.

The base has shallow simply moulded details around the base and at each corner and has applied moulding at the termination of the base section. A substantial metal door bearing a bronze Australian Coat of Arms surrounded by a laurel wreath is recessed into the north face. The dates 1914 and 1919 are located above and below the wreath, also in bronze.

On each of the other faces are polished granite plaques with the engraved names of those who made the Supreme Sacrifice (died). The southern face bears the names of the nine who fell in the First World War and the dates 1914 – 1919. The western face displays the names of the twelve who fell in the Second World War, and the eastern face is blank. Above the base is the body of the tower which is plain except for a simple central decorative element, painted dark brown. The uppermost section of the body has stop-chamfers to each corner which continue into the clock section.

The clock itself is located at the top of the tower and comprises four faces which are illuminated at night. The letters "Lest we forget" (reading clockwise) replace the numerals on each clock face.

== Heritage listing ==
Goomeri War Memorial Clock was listed on the Queensland Heritage Register on 21 October 1992 having satisfied the following criteria.

The place is important in demonstrating the evolution or pattern of Queensland's history.

War Memorials are important in demonstrating the pattern of Queensland's history as they are representative of a recurrent theme that involved most communities throughout the state. They provide evidence of an era of widespread Australian patriotism and nationalism, particularly during and following the First World War.

It also has special association with Brisbane metalworker Ernest Gunderson as an example of his workmanship.

The place demonstrates rare, uncommon or endangered aspects of Queensland's cultural heritage.

It is one of the few memorials in Queensland in the form of a clock tower and has uncommon decorative features.

The place is important in demonstrating the principal characteristics of a particular class of cultural places.

The monuments manifest a unique documentary record and are demonstrative of popular taste in the inter-war period.

Unveiled in 1940, the war memorial at Goomeri demonstrates the principal characteristics of a commemorative structure erected as an enduring record of a major historical event. This is achieved through the use of appropriate materials and design elements.

The place is important because of its aesthetic significance.

The memorial is of aesthetic significance as a dominant landmark in the main intersection of Goomeri, being the reason the town is known as 'the Clock Town.'

The place has a strong or special association with a particular community or cultural group for social, cultural or spiritual reasons.

It has a strong and continuing association with the community as evidence of the impact of a major historic event and as the focal point for the remembrance of that event.
