= Wide Bay Highway =

Highway in Queensland, Australia

Wide Bay Highway Queensland
- Wide Bay Highway (green and black)

General information
- Type: Highway
- Length: 62.6 km (39 mi)
- Route number(s): State Route 49

Major junctions
- West end: Burnett Highway / Bunya Highway, Goomeri, Queensland
- East end: Bruce Highway, 12km north of Gympie

Location(s)
- Major settlements: Kilkivan

Highway system
- Highways in Australia; National Highway • Freeways in Australia; Highways in Queensland

The Wide Bay Highway is a short state highway of Queensland, Australia running between Goomeri on the Burnett Highway and a junction on the Bruce Highway. From the junction it is 12 kilometres south to Gympie or 69 kilometres north to Maryborough. The length of the highway is 62.6 kilometres. It is a state-controlled regional road (number 44A).

At its western end the road continues from Goomeri as the Bunya Highway, connecting it to Dalby.

== Route description ==
Wide Bay Highway starts as State Route 49, at an intersection with the Bruce Highway in Bells Bridge, 12 kilometres (7.5 mi) north of Gympie. It runs west over the Mary River and then turns northwest until it enters Lower Wonga where it again turns west, passing the exit to Gympie–Woolooga Road to the south as it enters Woolooga. Crossing Woolooga it passes the exit to Bauple–Woolooga Road to the north and then turns southwest. Next it turns west across Oakview to Kilkivan. In the town of Kilkivan it turns southwest and passes the exit to Kilkivan–Tansey Road to the west. The road then runs southwest through Cinnabar to Kinbombi where it again turns west. It reaches Goomeri and turns northwest as it enters the town, ending at an intersection with the Burnett Highway.

== Intersecting state-controlled roads ==
This road intersects with the following state-controlled roads:

- Gympie–Woolooga Road
- Bauple–Woolooga Road
- Kilkivan–Tansey Road

== Gympie–Woolooga Road ==
Gympie–Woolooga Road
- Location: Bruce Highway, Gympie to Wide Bay Highway, Lower Wonga, via Widgee
- Length: 38.1 km (23.7 mi)

Gympie–Woolooga Road is a state-controlled district road (number 4806) rated as a local road of regional significance (LRRS). It runs from the Bruce Highway in Gympie, via Widgee, to the Wide Bay Highway in Lower Wonga, a distance of 38.1 kilometres (23.7 mi). This road has no major intersections.

== Bauple–Woolooga Road ==
Bauple–Woolooga Road
- Location: Bruce Highway, Bauple to Wide Bay Highway, Woolooga
- Length: 39.9 km (24.8 mi)

Bauple–Woolooga Road is a state-controlled district road (number 488) rated as local road of regional significance (LRRS). It runs from the Bruce Highway in Bauple to the Wide Bay Highway in Woolooga, a distance of 39.9 kilometres (24.8 mi). It intersects with Miva Road in Miva.

== Kilkivan–Tansey Road ==
Kilkivan–Tansey Road
- Location: Wide Bay Highway, Kilkivan to Burnett Highway, Tansey
- Length: 22.6 km (14.0 mi)

Kilkivan–Tansey Road is a state-controlled district road (number 486) rated as a local road of regional significance (LRRS). It runs from the Wide Bay Highway in Kilkivan to the Burnett Highway in Tansey, a distance of 22.6 kilometres (14.0 mi). This road has no major intersections.

== Linked state-controlled road ==
The following state-controlled road intersects with Bauple–Woolgoolga Road:

== Miva Road ==
Miva Road
- Location: Bruce Highway, Gunalda to Bauple–Woolgoolga Road, Miva
- Length: 17.8 km (11.1 mi)

Miva Road is a state-controlled district road (number 4808) rated as a local road of regional significance (LRRS). It runs from the Bruce Highway in Gunalda to Bauple–Woolgoolga Road in Miva, a distance of 17.8 kilometres (11.1 mi). This road has no major intersections.

== List of towns along the Wide Bay Highway ==
- Goomeri
- Kilkivan
- Woolooga

== Major intersections ==
LGA	Location	km	mi	Destinations	Notes
Gympie	Bells Bridge	0	0.0	Bruce Highway (Queensland Highway A1) – south – Gympie / north – Curra	Eastern end of Wide Bay Highway (State Route 49)
Gympie	Goomeri	62.6	38.9	Burnett Highway (State Route A3) – north – Ban Ban Springs / south – Nanango / Bunya Highway (State Route 49) – south, then west – Murgon	Western end of Wide Bay Highway. State Route 49 continues south for 1.8 km, duplexed with the Burnett Highway, before turning west as the Bunya Highway.
1.000 mi = 1.609 km; 1.000 km = 0.621 mi

== See also ==
- Highways in Australia
- List of highways in Queensland
