= Kilkivan, Queensland =

Kilkivan
- Town
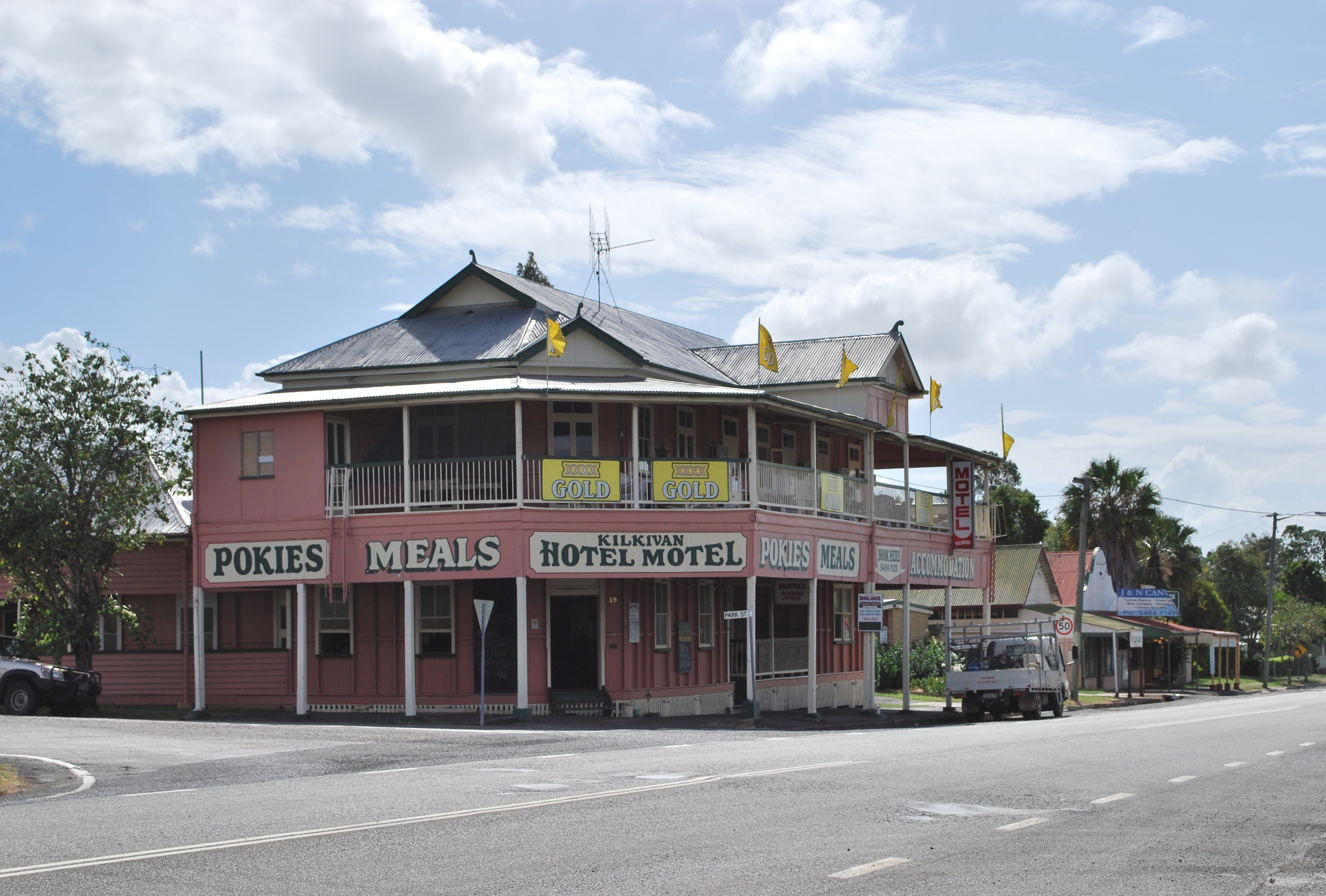
- Kilkivan Hotel Motel

- Interactive map of Kilkivan
- Coordinates: 26.085°S 152.2419°E
- Country: Australia
- State: Queensland
- LGA: Gympie Region
- Location: 49.6 km (30.8 mi) WNW of Gympie; 216 km (134 mi) NNW of Brisbane
- Established: 1840s

Government
  - State electorate: Nanango
  - Federal division: Wide Bay

Area
  - Total: 158.0 km^{2} (61.0 sq mi)

Population
  - Total: 689 (2021 census)
  - Density: 4.361/km^{2} (11.294/sq mi)
- Time zone: UTC+10:00 (AEST)
- Postcode: 4600
Localities around Kilkivan
| Tansey | Mudlo | Woolooga |
| Cinnabar | Kilkivan | Oakview |
| Black Snake | Oakview | Oakview |

Kilkivan /kɪlˈkiːvæn/ is a rural town and locality in the Gympie Region of Queensland, Australia. In the 2021 census, the locality of Kilkivan had a population of 689 people.

== Geography ==
The town is situated on the Wide Bay Highway, 229 kilometres (142 mi) north of the state capital, Brisbane and 50.4 kilometres (31.3 mi) west of Gympie. One Mile Creek (26.08202°S 152.24482°E) meanders through the town, east of the Wide Bay Highway. The town lies in the Mary River drainage basin.

Rossmore is a neighbourhood within the locality to the south-west of the town of Kilkivan (26.117°S 152.283°E).

== History ==
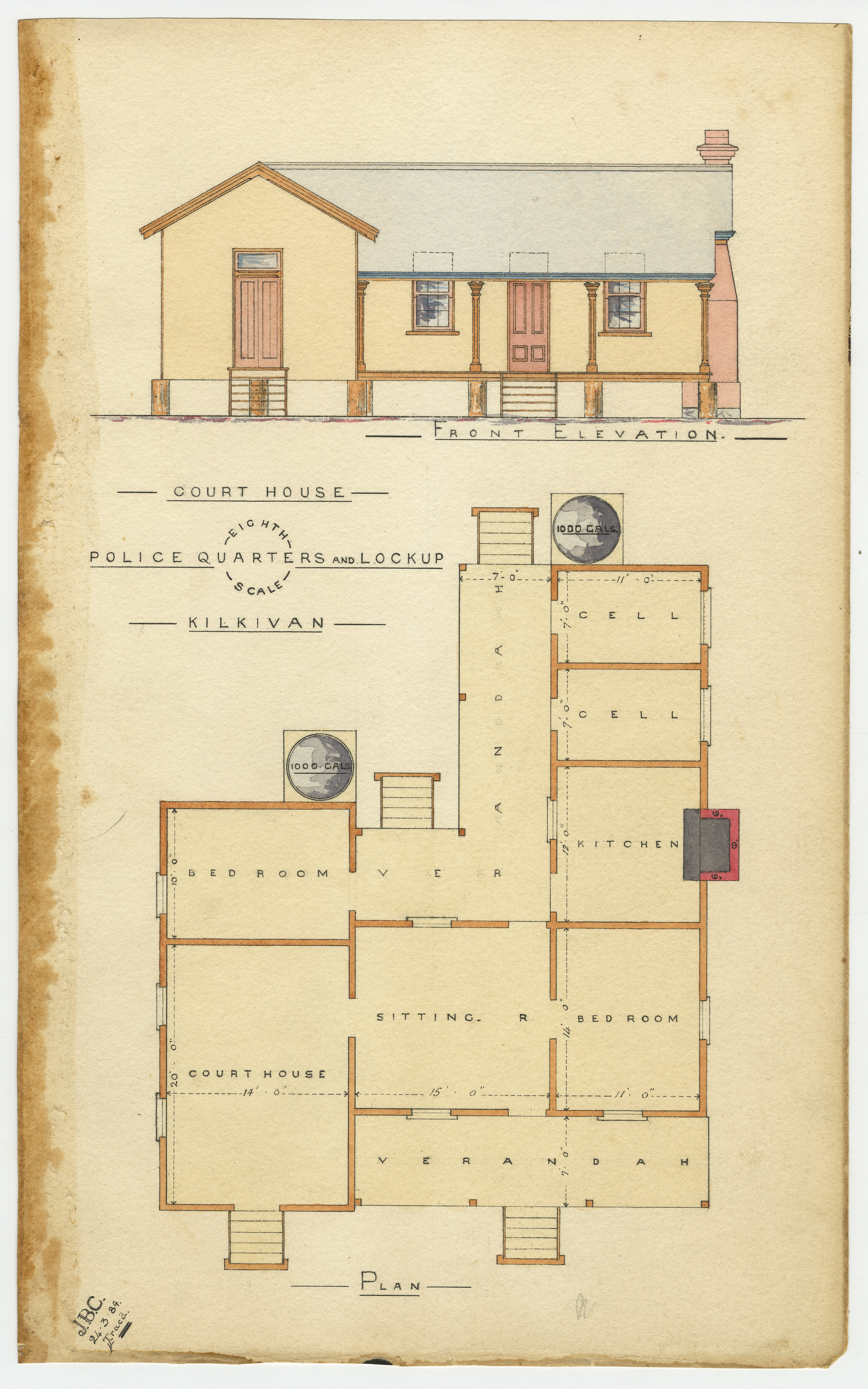
Architectural drawing of the Court House, Police Quarters and Lockup, Kilkivan, 1884

Kilkivan was first inhabited by the Wakka Wakka tribe of the Australian Aboriginal peoples. The town was first settled by Europeans in the 1840s. Queensland’s first gold discovery was at Kilkivan in 1852 and subsequent findings escalated into a gold rush in the 1860s. The town was named for a pastoral run owned by pastoralist John Daniel MacTaggart (1823–1871) after his father's farm name near Drumlemble, Kintyre, Scotland. The nearby Australian 'Glenbarr' property owned by MacTaggart was also named for a nearby Scottish farm.

Kilkivan Post Office opened on 8 June 1868. It was known as Neureum between 1876 and 1881.

Kilkivan State School opened in March 1876.

In 1883, a court house, police quarters and lock-up was built at a total cost of £748 10s. It was a wooden building with an iron roof and consisted of the court house, two bedrooms, sitting room, kitchen, verandahs, and two cells.

The Nanango railway line opened in December 1886 as far as Kilkivan. The locality was served by three railway stations:

- Bular railway station (26.0687°S 152.3024°E)
- Mouingba railway station (26.0604°S 152.2849°E)
- Kilkivan railway station (26.0842°S 152.2347°E)

Anticipation of the line opening brought an increase in the desire to build near the station, which was located on a goldfield. The line was officially closed in early 2010.

In 1887, two parcels of land were resumed from the Kilkivan pastoral run: one of 6,900 acres (2,800 ha) (described as "Murray's debatable land") and the other 32,000 acres (13,000 ha). The land was offered for selection for the establishment of small farms on 17 April 1887.

St Matthew's Anglican Church was dedicated in 1888 by Reverend E. C. Osbourne of Gympie. Its closure circa 2013 was approved by Bishop Rob Nolan.

Fairfield State School opened circa 1915. In 1916 it was renamed Rossmore State School. It was closed circa 1943.

The Kilkivan Library opened in 1967.

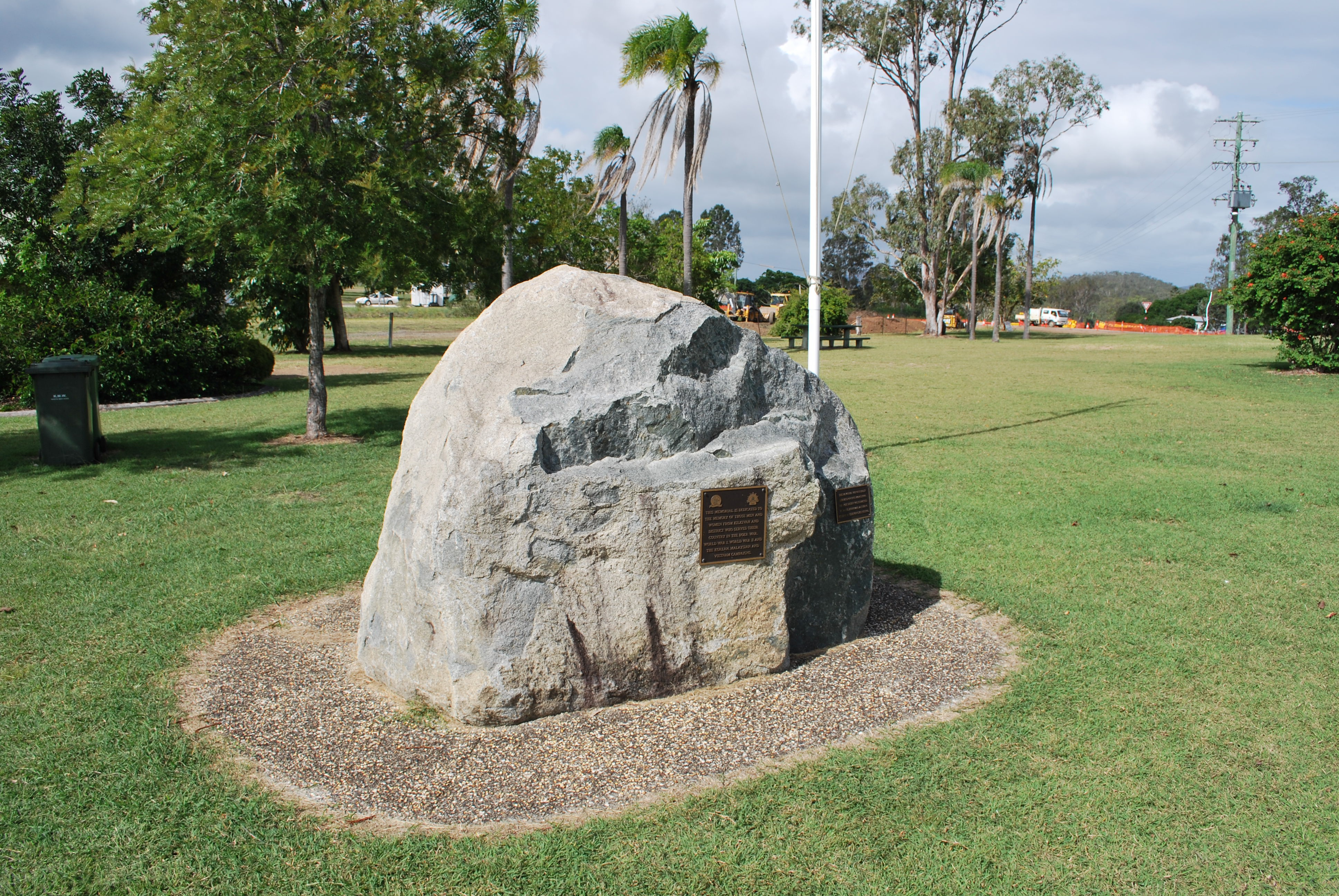
Kilkivan War Memorial, 2010

The Kilkivan War Memorial commemorates those of the district who served in the wars. It was dedicated on 28 March 1996.

On 16 August 2025, a 5.6 magnitude earthquake occurred with Kilkivan as the epicentre.

== Demographics ==
In the 2016 census, the locality of Kilkivan had a population of 713 people.

In the 2021 census, the locality of Kilkivan had a population of 689 people.

== Heritage listings ==
Kilkivan has a number of heritage-listed sites, including:

- Mount Clara smelter, Rossmore Road (26.1782°S 152.2726°E)

== Economy ==
Major industries today include tourism, beef, dairying and forestry.

== Education ==
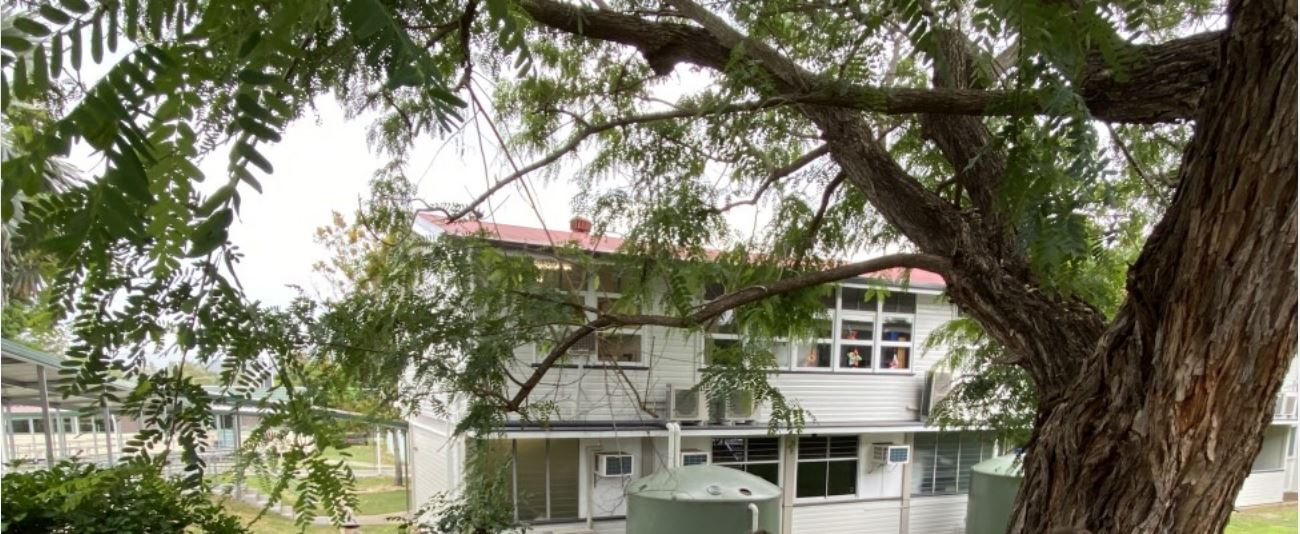
Kilkivan State School, 2020

Kilkivan State School is a government primary and secondary (Prep–10) school for boys and girls at 6 Council Street (26.0877°S 152.2413°E). In 2016, the school had an enrolment of 97 students with 14 teachers (12 full-time equivalent) and 10 non-teaching staff (7 full-time equivalent). In 2018, the school had an enrolment of 127 students with 14 teachers (13 full-time equivalent) and 11 non-teaching staff (8 full-time equivalent).

For secondary schooling to Year 12, the nearest government secondary school is James Nash State High School in Gympie to the south-east.

== Amenities ==
The Gympie Regional Council operates a public library at 31 Bligh Street (26.08630°S 152.24004°E).

The Kilkivan branch of the Queensland Country Women's Association meets at the CWA hall at 6 Park Street. The building was built as the council chambers of the Division of Kilkivan (later the Shire of Kilkivan) at 26 Bligh Street in 1890, but was purchased and relocated to its present site in 1958. The QCWA branch in Kilkivan was established in 1926.

Kilkivan Bowls Club is in Crescent Street.

== Attractions ==
The Kilkivan and District Museum and information centre in the main street features extensive displays which pay tribute to the region's early pioneers.

The country town features parks and restored historical buildings. Kilkivan has antique stores, a historical walk, and a cafe and B&B housed in the town's original bank.

Kilkivan is one of the few towns on the Bicentennial National Trail. A stone plaque commemorates the opening of the trail in 1988.

The Kilkivan Great Horse Ride is held annually in April. Over 1,000 horses and riders start from five points around Kilkivan and travel 20–30 kilometres (12–19 mi) along parts of the National Trail to Kilkivan for the Grand Parade down the main street.

Mudlo Gap is a popular forest park 8.5 kilometres (5.3 mi) north of Kilkivan.

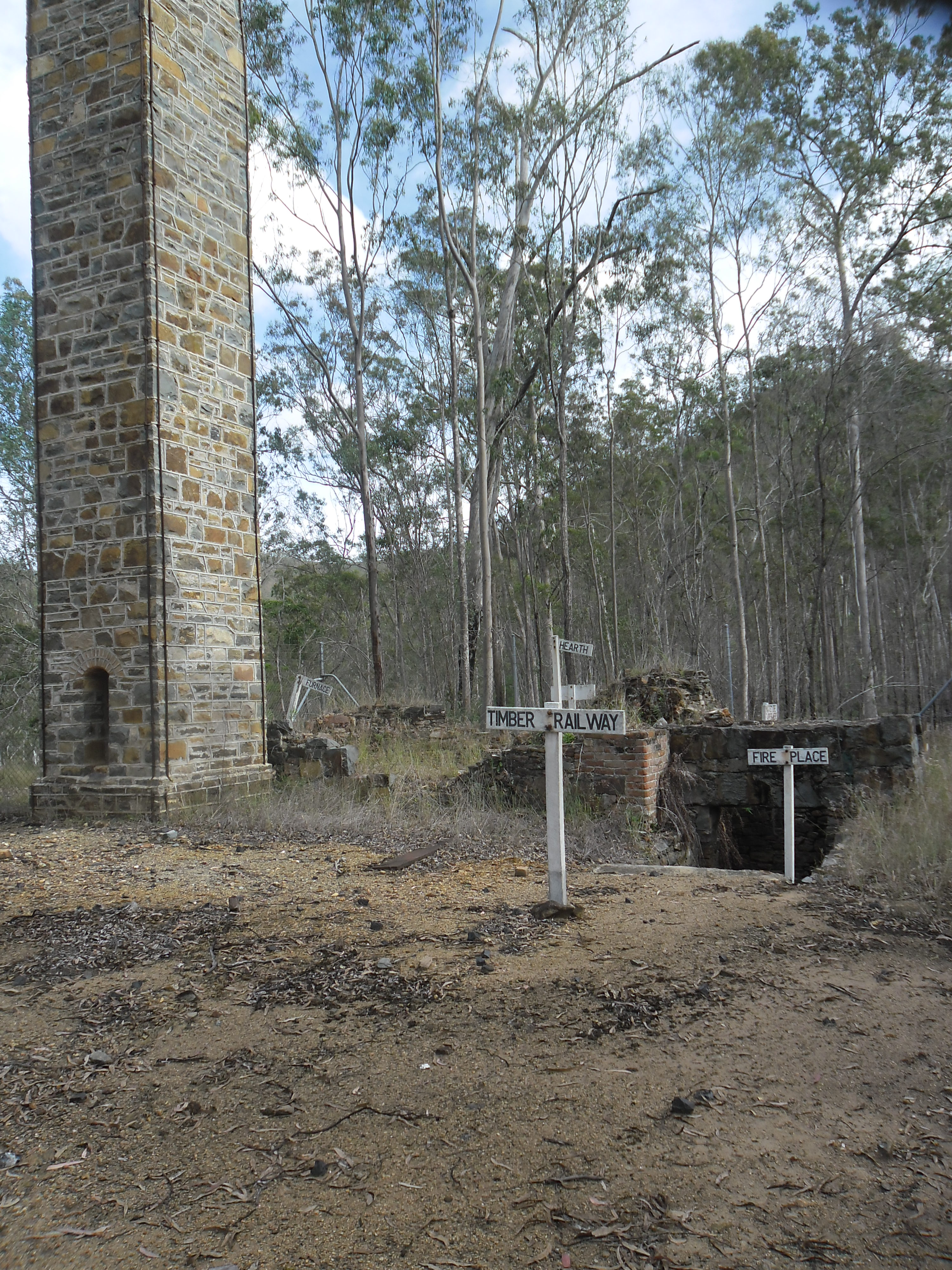
Mount Clara smelter and chimney

The Mount Clara chimney of Mount Clara Copper Smelter, thought to be the oldest surviving mining industry chimney in Queensland, and also among the first to have been built, is located 13 kilometres (8.1 mi) by road outside town, and is now conserved as a tourist attraction.

The Kilkivan to Kingaroy Rail Trail follows the old railway line between the two towns. It is 88 kilometres (55 mi) long and passes through Goomeri, Murgon, Wondai, Tingoora, Wooroolin, Memerambi, and Crawford. The trail from Kilkivan to Murgon is unsealed. The first creek crossing is of Coppermine Creek about 2.5 kilometres (1.6 mi) south west of Kilkivan. A low level bridge was opened across Wide Bay Creek in October 2021.
