= Gympie Local Heritage Register =

The Gympie Local Heritage Register is a list of heritage sites within the Gympie Region, Queensland, Australia. It is maintained by the Gympie Regional Council.

The local heritage listings for the Gympie Region include:

- Amamoor:
  - 4 Busby Street (26.34386°S 152.67310°E): Amamoor General Store
  - 10 Busby Street (26.34448°S 152.67376°E): Amamoor Butcher Shop
  - 31–33 Busby Street (26.34609°S 152.67581°E): Amamoor Hall
  - 2 Elizabeth Road (26.34706°S 152.67320°E): Amamoor State School
- Brooloo:
  - Mary Valley Road: Brooloo Hall
- Cedar Pocket:
  - Cedar Pocket Road: Cedar Pocket School of Arts
- Chatsworth:
  - 3 Allen Road: Chatsworth Hall
  - 15 Rammutt Road: Chatsworth School
- Dagun:
  - 39 Dagun Road: Dagun State School
  - Kimlin Lane: Dagun Railway Station
- Downsfield:
  - 1726 Sandy Creek Road: Sandy Creek Hall
- Glastonbury:
  - 1329 Glastonbury Road: Glastonbury Hall
- Gympie
  - 6 Bligh Street: Gympie Fire Station
  - 2 Caledonian Hill: Gympie City Town Hall
  - 15 Caledonian Hill: Salvation Army Temple
  - 24 Caledonian Hill: O’Donnel Residence
  - Caledonian Hill: Gympie Public Toilet Blocks
  - 17 Calton Terrace: Cameron House
  - Cartwright Road: Gympie West State School
  - 11 Channon Street: Kingston House
  - Channon Street: Surface Hill Uniting Church
  - 20 Channon Street: Freemasons Hotel
  - 22 Channon Street: Former Gympie Post Office
  - 26 Channon Street: Gympie Lands Office
  - 38 Channon Street: Gympie Courthouse
  - 39 Channon Street: Gympie Masonic Hall
  - 45 Channon Street: Prangley and Crofts designed house
  - 18 Crescent Road: 1880s house
  - 11 Crown Road: Presbyterian Church
  - 17 Crown Road: Former Gympie Ambulance Station
  - 29 Duke Street: Drill Hall
  - 1 Everson Road: Gympie State High School
  - 24 Excelsior Road: House
  - 1 Ferguson Street: 1950s house
  - 3 Graham Street: House
  - 8 Graham Street: Shop
  - 9 Graham Street: Former Nashville Police Station
  - 10 Graham Street: House
  - 11 Graham Street: Former One Mile Post Office
  - 15 Graham Street: Shop
  - 32 Hilton Road: House
  - 11 Hughes Terrace: House
  - 7 John Street: One Mile State School
  - 15 Kidgell Street: House
  - King Street: Gympie Police Station
  - 1 Lady Mary Terrace: Australian Hotel
  - 20 Lawrence Street: Gympie Central State School
  - 25 Mary Street: Shop
  - 62 – 76 Mary Street: Shop
  - 65 – 69 Mary Street: Patrick's Newsagency
  - 73 Mary Street: The Brown Jug Café
  - 92 Mary Street: Westpac Bank Building
  - 102 Mary Street: Wide Bay Capricorn Building
  - 104 Mary Street: Cullinanes Building
  - 135 Mary Street: Golden Age Hotel
  - 170 Mary Street: Billy's Hotel
  - 183 Mary Street: Mama & Papa's Pizzeria
  - 187 Mary Street: Formerly Kominsky's Store
  - 188 Mary Street: Royal Hotel
  - 199 Mary Street: Former Royal Bank
  - 201 Mary Street: Shop
  - 210 Mary Street: Victoria House
  - 214 Mary Street: Former Royal Exchange Hotel
  - 218 Mary Street: Jeffery and Cuddihy Building
  - 224 Mary Street: Shop
  - 230 Mary Street: Shop
  - 232 Mary Street: Shop
  - Stanton and Parkinson Building: 236 Mary Street: Neilson
  - 242 Mary Street: Gympie Regional Council Chambers
  - 250 Mary Street: The Chambers Hotel
  - Mellor Street: Council's Youth Development Office
  - 39 Monkland Road: Former Service Station
  - 69 Mount Pleasant Road: Mount Pleasant Hotel
  - Nash Street: Old Bank Building
  - 4 Nash Street: House
  - 8 Nash Street: House
  - 39 Nash Street: Gympie Art Gallery
  - 6 Nelson Road: Gympie Cordial Factory
  - 29 Perseverance Street: Commercial premises
  - 60 Pine Street: House
  - 88 Pine Street: House
  - 11 Red Hill Road: Formerly Old Fellow's Hall
  - 23 Red Hill Road: Formerly Red Hill Recreation Hall
  - 37 Red Hill Road: Foresters Hall
  - 11 Reef Street: Shop
  - 24 Reef Street: Land and Engineering Surveyors
  - River Road: Memorial Park Bandstand
  - River Road: Albert Park
  - 1 Station Road: Railway Station Hotel
  - 4 – 6 Stephens Street: House
  - 4 Stewart Terrace: Former Gympie Fire Station
  - 10 Struan Street: House
  - 5 Tozer Street: Commercial premises
  - 25 Tozer Street: Tozer Street Warehouses
  - 28 Tozer Street: Tozer Street Railway Station
  - 53 Tozer Street: Wide Bay Co-Op Buildings
  - 12 Watt Street: House
  - 14 Watt Street: House
  - 18 Watt Street: House
- Imbil:
  - 15 Edward Street: Imbil State School
  - 1 Elizabeth Road: Imbil Uniting Church
  - William Street: Imbil Railway Station
  - 34 Williams Street: Imbil Masonic Hall
  - 95 Yabba Road: Imbil Police Station
  - 100 Yabba Road: Imbil General Store
  - 110 Yabba Road: Imbil Hotel
  - 112 Yabba Road: Former Empire Theatre
  - 116 Yabba Road: Libby's Country Kitchen
  - 122 Yabba Road: Imbil Butcher Shop
  - 127 Yabba Road: Imbil RSL Hall
- Jones Hill:
  - Waterworks Road: Jones Hill Reservoir
  - Waterworks Road: Waterworks Pump House
  - 17 McIntosh Creek Road: Jones Hill School
- Kandanga:
  - Main Street: Kandanga Railway Station
  - 65 Main Street: Kandanga Cottage
  - 81 Main Street: Kandanga Memorial Hall
  - 84 – 86 Main Street: Kandanga State School
  - 41 – 45 Stephens Street: Sacred Heart Catholic Church
- Kandanga Creek:
  - 307 Sterling Road: Former Kandanga Sawmill
  - 251 Sterling Road: Kandanga Creek Community Hall
  - 249 Sterling Creek Road: Kandanga Creek State School
- Kia Ora:
  - 2572 Anderleigh Road: Kia Ora School
  - McCarthy Road: Kia Ora Methodist Church
- Kybong:
  - Bruce Highway: Kybong Hall
- Langshaw:
  - Upper Eel Creek Road: Langshaw Hall
  - 1574 Eel Creek Road: Langshaw State School
- Long Flat:
  - Mary Valley Road: Lagoon Pocket Methodist Church
  - 705 Mary Valley Road: Long Flat Hall
- Monkland:
  - Brisbane Road: Monkland Railway Station
  - Brisbane Road: Monkland State School
  - Brisbane Road: Monkland School Residence
  - Brisbane Road: No. 01 Scottish Gympie Gold Mine
  - 208 Brisbane Road: Inglewood Hill Pottery
- Mooloo:
  - Mooloo Road: Mooloo Hall
- Mothan Mountain:
  - Noosa Road: Mothar Mountain Hall
- Southside:
  - 50 Exhibition Road: Southside State School
- Tin Can Bay:
  - Cod Street: Tin Can Bay Picnic Shelter
  - Gympie Road: Tin Can Bay Memorial Hall
  - 22 – 24 Gympie Road: Tin Can Bay Church
- Traveston:
  - Alford Street: Traveston Railway Station
  - 1813 Bruce Highway: Traveston Homestead
  - Traveston Road: Traveston Public Hall
- Two Mile:
  - 288 Bruce Highway: Two Mile School
- Veteran:
  - Sandy Creek Road: Veteran School of Arts Hall
- Widgee Crossing North:
  - 260 Widgee Crossing Road: Former Widgee Crossing Shops
- Wolvi:
  - Kin Kin Road: Wolvi Hall
  - 936 Kin Kin Road: Wolvi State School
  - 888 Kin Kin Road: Wolvi Sawmill
