= Marys Creek, Queensland =

Marys Creek
- Suburb
- Interactive map of Marys Creek
- Coordinates: 26.25°S 152.5875°E
- Country: Australia
- State: Queensland
- LGA: Gympie Region
- Location: 14.2 km (8.8 mi) SW of Gympie; 174 km (108 mi) N of Brisbane

Government
  - State electorate: Gympie
  - Federal division: Wide Bay

Area
  - Total: 9.2 km^{2} (3.6 sq mi)

Population
  - Total: 86 (2021 census)
  - Density: 9.35/km^{2} (24.21/sq mi)
- Time zone: UTC+10:00 (AEST)
- Postcode: 4570
Suburbs around Marys Creek
Glastonbury	Scrubby Creek	Pie Creek
Upper Glastonbury	Marys Creek	Pie Creek
Upper Glastonbury	Langshaw	Langshaw

Marys Creek is a rural locality in the Gympie Region, Queensland, Australia. In the 2021 census, Marys Creek had a population of 86 people.

== Geography ==
The land use is predominantly grazing on native vegetation with some horticulture.

== Demographics ==
In the 2016 census, Marys Creek had a population of 78 people.

In the 2021 census, Marys Creek had a population of 86 people.

== Education ==
There are no schools in Marys Creek. The nearest government primary school is Gympie South State School in Southside, Gympie, to the north-west. The nearest government secondary school is James Nash State High School in Gympie.
