= Upper Kandanga, Queensland =

Upper Kandanga
- Suburb
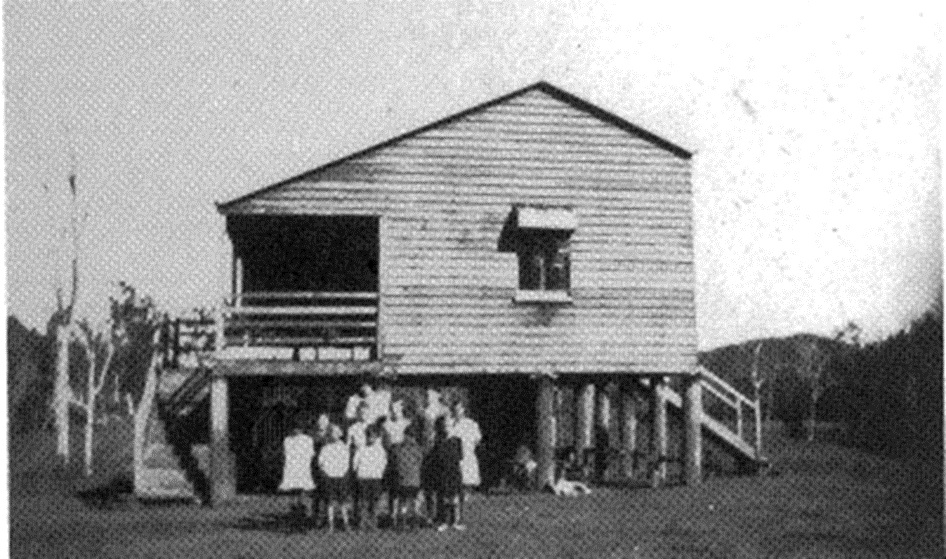
- Kandanga Valley Provisional School, circa 1930

- Interactive map of Upper Kandanga
- Coordinates: 26.4472°S 152.5277°E
- Country: Australia
- State: Queensland
- LGA: Gympie Region
- Location: 12.9 km (8.0 mi) WSW of Kandanga; 15.5 km (9.6 mi) NW of Imbil; 35.1 km (21.8 mi) SSW of Gympie; 178 km (111 mi) NNW of Brisbane

Government
  - State electorate: Gympie
  - Federal division: Wide Bay

Area
  - Total: 121.6 km^{2} (47.0 sq mi)
- Elevation: 168–700 m (551–2,297 ft)

Population
  - Total: 49 (2021 census)
  - Density: 0.403/km^{2} (1.044/sq mi)
- Time zone: UTC+10:00 (AEST)
- Postcode: 4570
Suburbs around Upper Kandanga
Wrattens Forest	Amamoor Creek	Kandanga Creek
Manumbar	Upper Kandanga	Imbil
Kingaham	Lake Borumba	Bella Creek

Upper Kandanga is a rural locality in the Gympie Region, Queensland, Australia. In the 2021 census, Upper Kandanga had a population of 49 people.

== Geography ==
The terrain varies from the westernmost part of the locality at 700 metres (2,300 ft) above sea level to the eastern part of the locality at 168 metres (551 ft).

The watercourse Kandanga Creek rises in the west of the locality and flows through the locality where it exits to the neighbouring locality of Kandanga Creek to the north-east. The locality presumably takes its name from the creek, with Kandanga derived from the Aboriginal word koondangoor in the Kabi language, meaning mountainous.

The higher western part of the locality is within Wrattens National Park, which extends into neighbouring Wrattens Forest to the north-west and Aramoor Creek to the north. Apart from the protected area, the predominant land use is grazing on native vegetation.

The main road through the locality is Kandanga Creek Road which enters the locality from the east (the locality of Kandanga Creek) and proceeds west through the locality towards the national park.

== History ==
Kandanga Valley Provisional School opened on 4 March 1926 with 12 students under headteacher Miss Mary Bothams. It closed 31 December 1935. It was at 1620 Kandanga Creek Road (26.42213°S 152.56528°E).

== Demographics ==
In the 2016 census, Upper Kandanga had a population of 63 people.

In the 2021 census, Upper Kandanga had a population of 49 people.

== Education ==
There are no schools in Upper Kandanga. The nearest government primary schools are Kandanga State School in Kandanga to the east, Aramoor State School in Aramoor to the north-east, and Mary Valley State College in neighbouring Imbil to the east. The nearest government secondary schools are Mary Valley State College (to Year 10) in Imbil, Gympie State High School (to Year 12) in Gympie, and James Nash State High School (to Year 12) in Gympie.

There are also a number of non-government schools in Gympie and its suburbs.
