= Amamoor Creek, Queensland =

Amamoor Creek
- Suburb
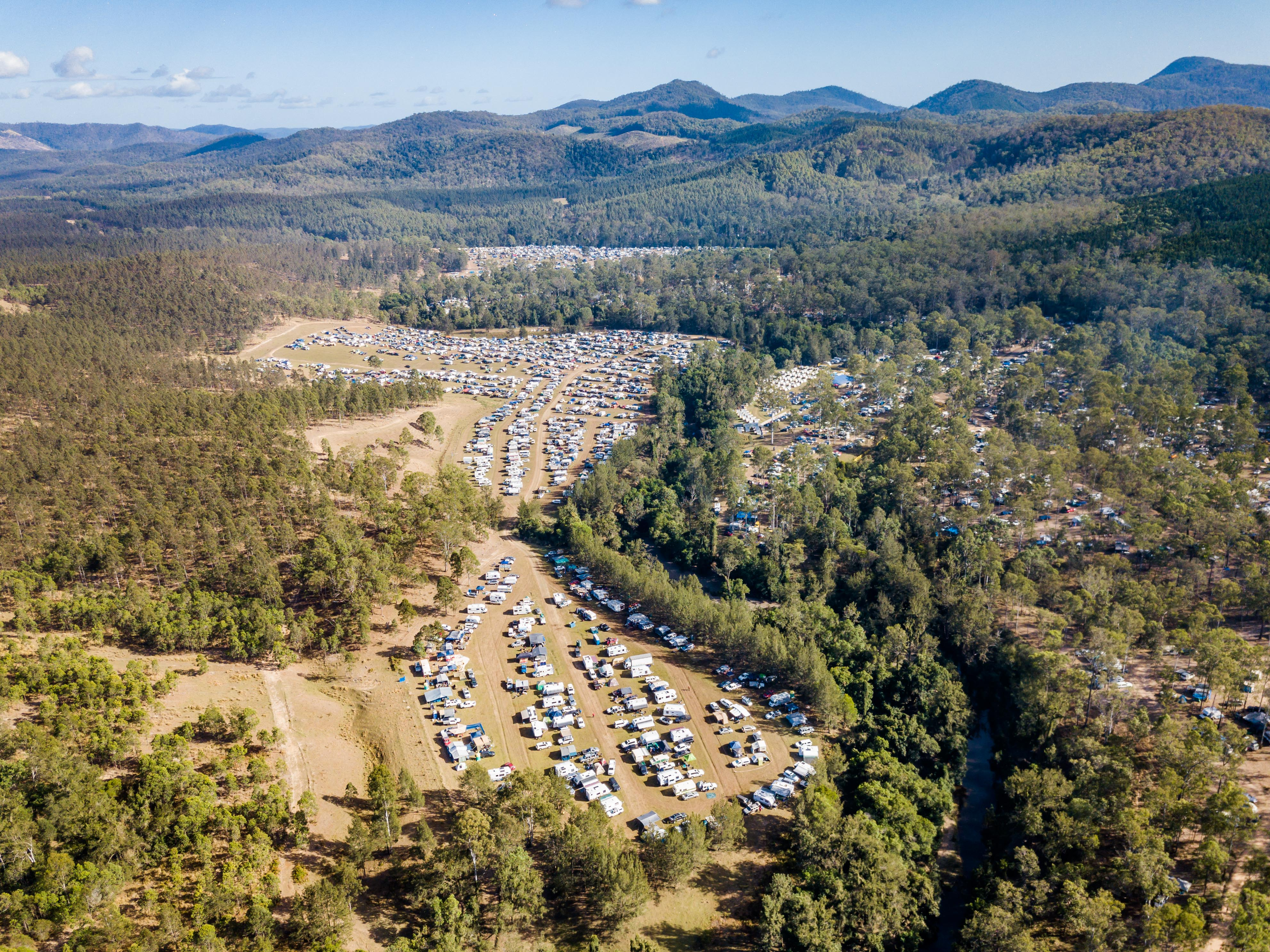
- Gympie Music Muster at Amamoor Creek

- Interactive map of Amamoor Creek
- Coordinates: 26.3861°S 152.5069°E
- Country: Australia
- State: Queensland
- LGA: Gympie Region
- Location: 15.5 km (9.6 mi) W of Amamoor; 28.1 km (17.5 mi) SW of Gympie; 176 km (109 mi) NNW of Brisbane

Government
  - State electorate: Gympie
  - Federal division: Wide Bay

Area
  - Total: 168.9 km^{2} (65.2 sq mi)

Population
  - Total: 56 (2021 census)
  - Density: 0.3316/km^{2} (0.859/sq mi)
- Time zone: UTC+10:00 (AEST)
- Postcode: 4570
Suburbs around Amamoor Creek
Upper Glastonbury	Upper Glastonbury; Langshaw	Mooloo; Calico Creek; Dagun
Wrattens Forest	Amamoor Creek	Amamoor
Upper Kandanga	Upper Kandanga	Kandanga Creek

Amamoor Creek is a rural locality in the Gympie Region, Queensland, Australia. In the 2021 census, Amamoor Creek had a population of 56 people.

== Geography ==
The locality is roughly bounded to the south by the Amamoor Range, to the west by the Coast Range, and to the north by an unnamed ridgeline and the Ward Range.

Amamoor Creek has the following peaks along its northern boundary (from west to east):

- Tewoo Rock (26.3456°S 152.4471°E) 520 metres (1,710 ft)
- Mount Tewoo (26.3436°S 152.4597°E) 626 metres (2,054 ft)
- Mount Wilwarrel (26.3468°S 152.5721°E) 429 metres (1,407 ft)
- Little Baldy (26.3242°S 152.6283°E) 347 metres (1,138 ft)

Most of the east of the locality is within the Amamoor State Forest (26.3425°S 152.6308°E). The west of the locality is within Wrattens National Park (26.3866°S 152.4347°E). The land use in the middle of the locality is predominantly grazing on native vegetation.

== History ==
Amamoor Creek was named and bounded on 1 December 2000. Amamoor was the name of a pastoral run in the rea held by J.D. McTaggart in the late 1850s.

Forest Station State School opened on 3 March 1939, replacing Diamond Field State School in Amamoor. It closed in 1965 due to low student numbers. It was on Amamoor Creek Road adjacent to the Amamoor State Forest, near the Amama Day Use Area (approx 26.36174°S 152.63478°E).

Amamoor State Forest was declared on 1 January 1980 under the Forestry Act 1959.

In January 1982 the Webb Brothers (Fabian, Marius and Berard) won a Golden Guitar Award at the Tamworth Country Music Festival for their song "Who put the Roo in the Stew?", a reference to a recent scandal in which kangaroo meat had been found in hamburger mince exported from Australia. Their family-owned pastoral property Thornside was approaching its 100th anniversary of its establishment by their grandfather George and they decided to celebrate the occasion by hosting a country music event at their property to raise money for the Gympie Apex Club, a local community group. With the help of the Apex Club, local volunteers and the radio station 4QR (then a country music station), the first Gympie Music Muster was held on 24–26 September 1982 on 25 hectares of creek flats at Thornside. It attracted 6,000 people and raised $15,000 for local charities. After three years, the growing number of people attending (many of them camping on-site) made it necessary to find a new location near the Amamoor State Forest. A decision was also made to hold the event in August for better weather. The popularity of the event attracted many top country music performers. The event was held annually until 2019 after which it was cancelled in 2020 and 2021 due to the COVID pandemic.

Wrattens National Park was gazetted in 2009.

== Demographics ==
In the 2016 census Amamoor Creek had a population of 56 people.

In the 2021 census, Amamoor Creek had a population of 56 people.

== Education ==
There are no schools in Amamoor Creek. The nearest government primary schools are Amamoor State School in neighbouring Amamoor to the east and Widgee State School in Widgee to the north-west. The nearest government secondary schools are Mary Valley State College (to Year 10) in Imbil to the south-east and James Nash State High School (to Year 12) in Gympie to the north-east.

== Events ==
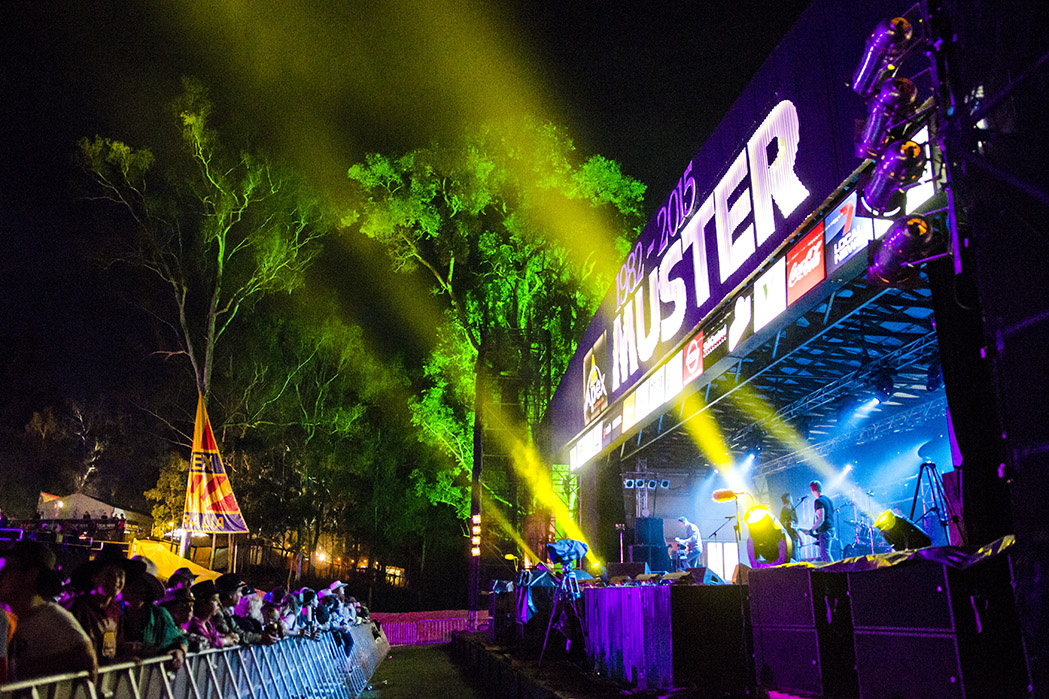
Gympie Music Muster

The Gympie Music Muster is an annual event held in August (26.3597°S 152.5598°E).
