= Upper Glastonbury =

- Suburb
- Interactive map of Upper Glastonbury
- Coordinates: 26.2958°S 152.4861°E
- Country: Australia
- State: Queensland
- LGA: Gympie Region
- Location: 24.8 km (15.4 mi) SW of Gympie; 198 km (123 mi) NNW of Brisbane

Government
  - State electorate: Gympie
  - Federal division: Wide Bay

Area
  - Total: 141.2 km^{2} (54.5 sq mi)

Population
  - Total: 56 (2021 census)
  - Density: 0.397/km^{2} (1.027/sq mi)
- Time zone: UTC+10:00 (AEST)
- Postcode: 4570
Suburbs around Upper Glastonbury
Widgee	Glastonbury	Marys Creek
Widgee	Upper Glastonbury	Langshaw
Wrattens Forest	Amamoor Creek	Amamoor Creek

Upper Glastonbury is a rural locality in the Gympie Region, Queensland, Australia. In the 2021 census, Upper Glastonbury had a population of 56 people.

== Geography ==
Upper Glastonbury has the following mountains:

- Mount Gentle Annie (26.3184°S 152.5212°E) 554 metres (1,818 ft)
- Mount Mittarula (26.3127°S 152.5373°E) 460 metres (1,510 ft)
- Mount Moorooreerai (26.2809°S 152.5376°E) 625 metres (2,051 ft)
- Mount Warrawee (26.2883°S 152.5099°E) 587 metres (1,926 ft)

The Glastonbury National Park is in two sections, one in the north-east of the locality and the other just east of centre. Connecting the two sections is the Marys Creek State Forest which occupies the east and south-east of the locality. The Glastonbury State Forest is in the north of the locality.

Apart from the above protected areas, the land use is grazing on native vegetation.

== History ==
Warrawee State School opened on 28 January 1936. It closed on 2 May 1975. It was at 821 Glastonbury Creek Road (26.27647°S 152.49765°E).

== Demographics ==
In the 2016 census, Upper Glastonbury had a population of 49 people.

In the 2021 census, Upper Glastonbury had a population of 56 people.

== Education ==
There are no schools in Upper Glastonbury. The nearest government primary schools are Widgee State School in neighbouring Widgee to the north-west and Gympie South State School in Southside to the north-east. The nearest government secondary school is James Nash State High School in Gympie to the north-east. There are also non-government schools in Gympie and its suburbs.
