= Scrubby Creek, Queensland (Gympie Region) =

Scrubby Creek
- Suburb
- Interactive map of Scrubby Creek
- Coordinates: 26.225°S 152.5694°E
- Country: Australia
- State: Queensland
- LGA: Gympie Region
- Location: 12.7 km (7.9 mi) WSW of Gympie; 186 km (116 mi) N of Brisbane

Government
  - State electorate: Gympie
  - Federal division: Wide Bay

Area
  - Total: 4.7 km^{2} (1.8 sq mi)

Population
  - Total: 62 (2021 census)
  - Density: 13.19/km^{2} (34.2/sq mi)
- Time zone: UTC+10:00 (AEST)
- Postcode: 4570
Suburbs around Scrubby Creek
Glastonbury	The Palms	Pie Creek
Glastonbury	Scrubby Creek	Pie Creek
Glastonbury	Pie Creek	Marys Creek

Scrubby Creek is a rural locality in the Gympie Region, Queensland, Australia. In the 2021 census, Scrubby Creek had a population of 62 people.

== History ==
Scrubby Creek Provisional School opened on 20 August 1934 under head teacher Miss V. Flynn. In 1935, it became Scrubby Creek State School. It closed on 6 May 1960. It was at 707 Rocks Road (26.20514°S 152.58153°E).

== Demographics ==
In the 2016 census, Scrubby Creek had a population of 55 people.

In the 2021 census, Scrubby Creek had a population of 62 people.

== Education ==
There are no schools in Scrubby Creek. The nearest government primary school is Gympie South State School in Southside to the east. The nearest government secondary school is James Nash State High School in Gympie to the north-east. There are also a number of non-government schools in Gympie and its suburbs.
