= Mooloo, Queensland =

Mooloo
- Suburb
- Interactive map of Mooloo
- Coordinates: 26.2986°S 152.6138°E
- Country: Australia
- State: Queensland
- LGA: Gympie Region
- Location: 16.7 km (10.4 mi) SW of Gympie; 176 km (109 mi) N of Brisbane

Government
  - State electorate: Gympie
  - Federal division: Wide Bay

Area
  - Total: 23.3 km^{2} (9.0 sq mi)

Population
  - Total: 171 (2021 census)
  - Density: 7.34/km^{2} (19.01/sq mi)
- Time zone: UTC+10:00 (AEST)
- Postcode: 4570
Suburbs around Mooloo
Langshaw	Pie Creek	McIntosh Creek
Langshaw	Mooloo	Calico Creek
Amamoor Creek	Amamoor Creek	Amamoor Creek

Mooloo is a rural locality in the Gympie Region, Queensland, Australia. In the 2021 census, Mooloo had a population of 171 people.

== History ==
Mooloo Provisional School opened in 1919. In 1922, it became Mooloo State School. It closed on 10 August 1962. It was at approx 712 Mooloo Road (26.3019°S 152.6089°E).

== Demographics ==
In the 2016 census, Mooloo had a population of 146 people.

In the 2021 census, Mooloo had a population of 171 people.

== Heritage listings ==
Mooloo has the following heritage sites:

- Mooloo Hall, Mooloo Road

== Education ==
There are no schools in Mooloo. The nearest government primary schools are Gympie South State School in Southside to the north and Dagun State School in Dagun to the east. The nearest government secondary schools are Gympie State High School and James Nash State High School, both in Gympie to the north-east. There are also a number of non-government schools in Gympie and its suburbs.
