= Widgee Crossing South, Queensland =

Widgee Crossing South
- Suburb
- Interactive map of Widgee Crossing South
- Coordinates: 26.1986°S 152.6111°E
- Country: Australia
- State: Queensland
- LGA: Gympie Region
- Location: 6.4 km (4.0 mi) W of Gympie; 180 km (110 mi) N of Brisbane

Government
  - State electorate: Gympie
  - Federal division: Wide Bay

Area
  - Total: 5.2 km^{2} (2.0 sq mi)

Population
  - Total: 33 (2021 census)
  - Density: 6.35/km^{2} (16.4/sq mi)
- Time zone: UTC+10:00 (AEST)
- Postcode: 4570
Suburbs around Widgee Crossing South
The Palms	Widgee Crossing North	Widgee Crossing North
The Palms	Widgee Crossing South	Southside
The Palms	Pie Creek	Nahrunda

Widgee Crossing South is a rural locality in the Gympie Region, Queensland, Australia. In the 2021 census, Widgee Crossing South had a population of 33 people.

== Geography ==
The Mary River forms the north-eastern boundary. Eel Creek forms the south-eastern boundary and part of the eastern as it flows north to join the Mary. Glastonbury Road forms most of the southern boundary.

Widgee Crossing is a ford over the Mary River (26.1919°S 152.6201°E) along the Widgee Crossing Road.

The terrain varies from 40 to 140 metres (130 to 460 ft) above sea level with the lower-lying land closer to the river and creeks and rising towards the south-west. Lynch Hill (also known as Lynchs Hill) is the highest point of the locality (26.2027°S 152.6050°E). It was named after Cornelius Lynch who selected Portion 4 in the Parish of King, in 1869.

The south-western corner of the locality is within the Lynchs Hill State Forest. Apart from this protected area, there is some rural residential housing in the south-east of the locality with the land use in the north of the locality being grazing on native vegetation.

== History ==
The two localities of Widgee Crossing North and Widgee Crossing South take their names from the ford over the Mary River. This was an important crossing point during the Gympie gold rush. As the names suggest, Widgee Crossing North is on the northern side of the ford and Widgee Crossing South is on the southern side of the ford. A bridge was built but it was washed away in a flood in the 1960s.

== Demographics ==
In the 2016 census, Widgee Crossing South had a population of 35 people.

In the 2021 census, Widgee Crossing South had a population of 33 people.

== Education ==
There are no schools in Widgee Crossing South. The nearest government primary school is Gympie South State School in neighbouring Southside to the east. The nearest government secondary school is James Nash State High School in Gympie to the north-east.
