= The Palms, Queensland =

The Palms
- Suburb
- Interactive map of The Palms
- Coordinates: 26.1902°S 152.5861°E
- Country: Australia
- State: Queensland
- LGA: Gympie Region
- Location: 10.5 km (6.5 mi) W of Gympie; 188 km (117 mi) N of Brisbane

Government
  - State electorate: Gympie
  - Federal division: Wide Bay

Area
  - Total: 15.7 km^{2} (6.1 sq mi)

Population
  - Total: 1,083 (2021 census)
  - Density: 68.98/km^{2} (178.7/sq mi)
- Time zone: UTC+10:00 (AEST)
- Postcode: 4570
Suburbs around The Palms
Glastonbury	Fishermans Pocket	Widgee Crossing North
Glastonbury	The Palms	Widgee Crossing South
Scrubby Creek	Pie Creek	Pie Creek

The Palms is a rural residential locality in the Gympie Region, Queensland, Australia. In the 2021 census, The Palms had a population of 1,083 people.

== Geography ==
The Mary River forms the northern and north-eastern boundaries of the locality. The terrain ranges from 40 to 170 metres (130 to 560 ft) above sea level with the lower elevations closer to the river.

Glastonbury Road enters the locality from the south-east (Widgee Crossing South) and exits to the south-west (Glastonbury).

The predominant land use is rural residential with some areas (mostly in the north-west) used for grazing on native vegetation.

== History ==
The locality was officially named on 9 October 1982 and bounded on 1 December 2000.

== Demographics ==
In the 2016 census, The Palms had a population of 1,010 people.

In the 2021 census, The Palms had a population of 1,083 people.

== Education ==
There are no schools in The Palms. The nearest government primary school is Gympie South State School in Southside to the east. The nearest government secondary school is James Nash State High School in Gympie to the east.
