= Pie Creek =

- Suburb
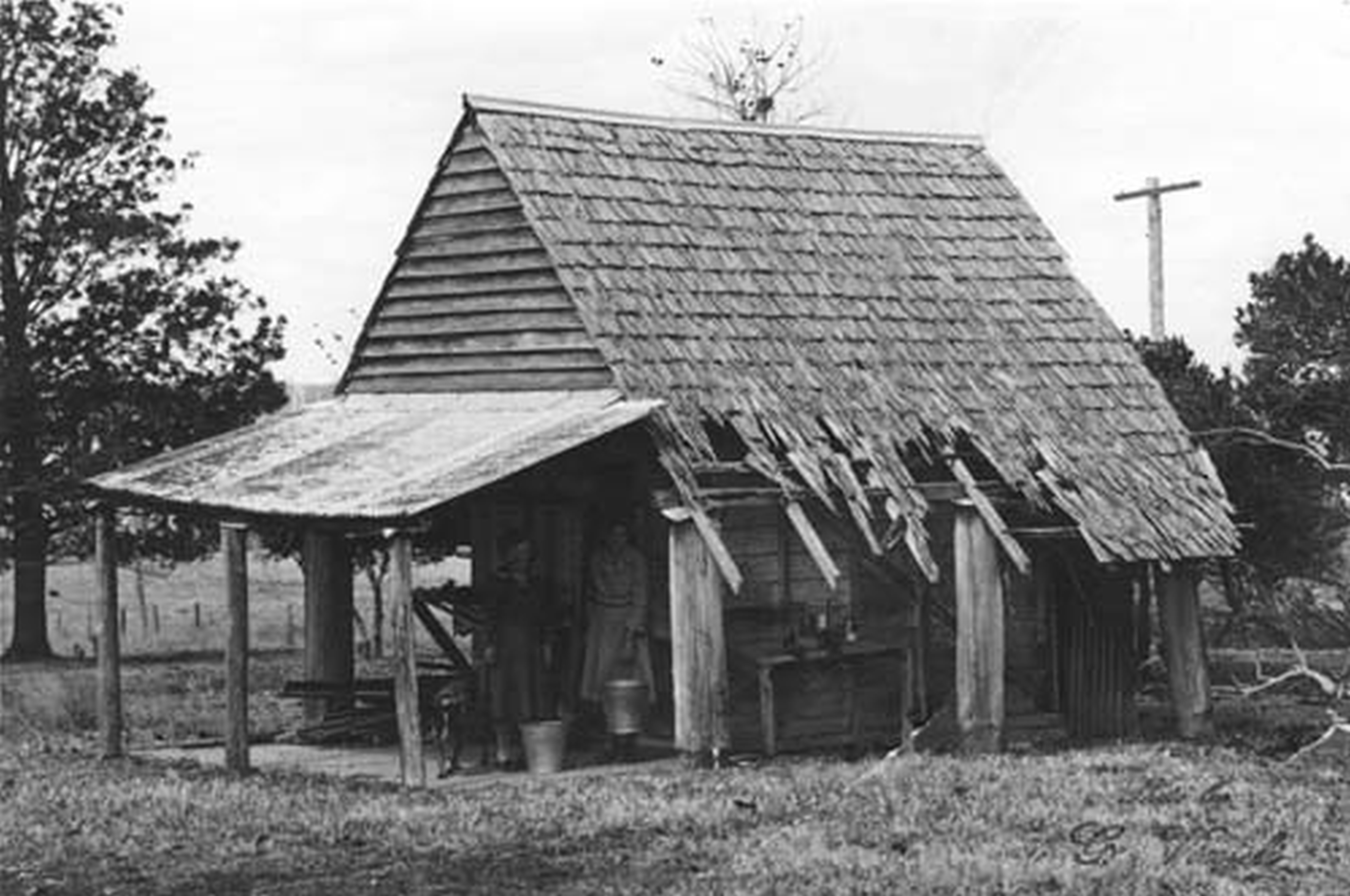
- Dairy shed at Lorensen farm, circa 1950

- Interactive map of Pie Creek
- Coordinates: 26.2416°S 152.6194°E
- Country: Australia
- State: Queensland
- LGA: Gympie Region
- Location: 8.4 km (5.2 mi) SW of Gympie; 177 km (110 mi) N of Brisbane

Government
  - State electorate: Gympie
  - Federal division: Wide Bay

Area
  - Total: 21.4 km^{2} (8.3 sq mi)

Population
  - Total: 1,137 (2021 census)
  - Density: 53.13/km^{2} (137.6/sq mi)
- Time zone: UTC+10:00 (AEST)
- Postcode: 4570
Suburbs around Pie Creek
The Palms	Widgee Crossing South	Nahrunda; Southside
Scrubby Creek	Pie Creek	Jones Hill
Marys Creek	Langshaw; Mooloo	McIntosh Creek

Pie Creek is a rural locality in the Gympie Region, Queensland, Australia. In the 2021 census, Pie Creek had a population of 1,137 people.

== Geography ==
Eel Creek forms part of the northern boundary of the locality. The watercourse Pie Creek (from which the locality presumably takes its name) rises in neighbouring Mooloo to the south and enters the locality from Mooloo, flowing northwards through the locality, and then forms the north-eastern boundary of the locality where it becomes a tributary of Eel Creek.

Land use is predominantly grazing on native vegetation and rural residential housing.

== History ==
Pie Creek Provisional School opened circa 1896. On 1 January 1909, it became Pie Creek State School. It closed in 1962. It was at 494 Eel Creek Road (26.24139°S 152.61843°E). The school building was still extant when the property was sold on 7 February 2023.

The Pie Creek Community Hall was established through the efforts of the Pie and Eel Creek Bands on a 1-acre (0.40 ha) site donated by Mr E. B. Barnes. It was officially opened on Sunday 26 July 1903, intended to be used for religious services, public meetings and social events. In 1967, the Widgee Shire Council (now the Gympie Regional Council) became the trustee of the hall and the local committee disbanded in November 1971. In 1996, local residents led by Joole Gibbs established the Pie Creek Hall Committee Inc and redeveloped the hall as a multifunctional community facility.

== Demographics ==
In the 2016 census, Pie Creek had a population of 1,013 people.

In the 2021 census, Pie Creek had a population of 1,137 people.

== Education ==
There are no schools in Pie Creek. The nearest government primary school is Gympie South State School in neighbouring Southside to the north-east and Jones Hill State School in neighbouring Jones Hill to the east. The nearest government secondary schools are James Nash State High School and Gympie State High School, both in Gympie to north-east.

== Amenities ==
Pie Creek Community Hall is on the western corner of Eel Creek Road and Herron Road (26.24110°S 152.61949°E). It is run by volunteers and can be rented for private functions and community events.

== Facilities ==
Gympie South Rural Fire Station is on the north-west corner of Regan Road and Lawson Road (26.2330°S 152.6383°E).
