= Wrattens Forest, Queensland =

Wrattens Forest
- Suburb
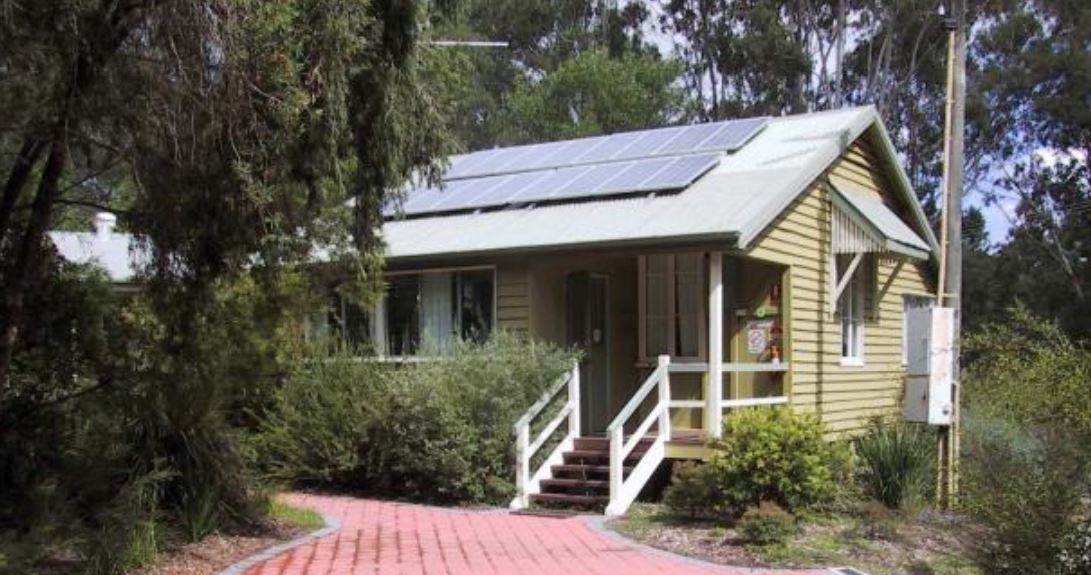
- Former Gallangowan State School from Manumbar, now relocated to the Barambah Environmental Education Centre in Wrattens Forest, 2024

- Interactive map of Wrattens Forest
- Coordinates: 26.3025°S 152.3538°E
- Country: Australia
- State: Queensland
- LGA: Gympie Region
- Location: 40.3 km (25.0 mi) SE of Goomeri; 51.3 km (31.9 mi) WSW of Gympie; 201 km (125 mi) NNW of Brisbane

Government
  - State electorate: Nanango
  - Federal division: Wide Bay

Area
  - Total: 158.3 km^{2} (61.1 sq mi)

Population
  - Total: 0 (2021 census)
  - Density: 0.0000/km^{2} (0.000/sq mi)
- Time zone: UTC+10:00 (AEST)
- Postcode: 4601
Suburbs around Wrattens Forest
Cinnabar	Black Snake	Widgee
Manumbar	Wrattens Forest	Upper Glastonbury
Manumbar	Upper Kandanga	Amamoor Creek

Wrattens Forest is a rural locality in the Gympie Region, Queensland, Australia. In the 2021 census, Wrattens Forest had "no people or a very low population".

== Geography ==
The terrain is mountainous and is part of the Coastal Range with Mount Mia at 26.2494°S 152.2706°E at a height of 614 metres (2,014 ft).

The entire locality is a protected area. Most of it is within the Wrattens National Park, but some areas are in within the Wrattens Conservation Park, the Wrattens State Forest and the Wrattens Resources Reserve. There is no private land use.

== History ==
The locality was named after forest overseer Bill Wratten, who worked at state forests at Cherbourg and Wondai.

Barambah Environmental Education Centre was established in 1962/63 on a greenfield site as A Flat Forest Station. The Department of Education acquired the site in 1977 and named it the Mary River Field Study Centre. Facilities at the Centre in 1977 were very basic with an office, a corrugated iron walled dining room with an open fireplace for cooking meals and three wooden sleeping quarters. There were no gardens and only a few trees in the centre grounds. In 1980, the centre was renamed the Barambah Field Study Centre and, in 1988, it was renamed the Barambah Environmental Education Centre. In the 1990s, the old school building at Gallangowan (now neighbouring Manumbar) was moved to the centre and is used as the office and staff room. By 2019, the centre had native gardens with an extensive plant nursery, with three hot houses and a large fenced hardening area.

To mark World Environment Day on 5 June 2009, Queensland Minister for Climate Change and Sustainability, Kate Jones, announced the establishment of the Wrattens National Park, consisting of 20,869 hectares (51,570 acres) which was formerly part of Wrattens State Forest. A new Wrattens Conservation Park was also established surrounding the Barambah Environmental Education Centre.

== Demographics ==
In the 2016 census, Wrattens Forest had "no people or a very low population".

In the 2021 census, Wrattens Forest had "no people or a very low population".

== Education ==
Barambah Environmental Education Centre is an Outdoor and Environmental Education Centre at 301 A Flat Road (26.3413°S 152.3289°E). The dining room and kitchen facilities have been updated. It has the capacity to sleep 75 people.

== Attribution ==
This Wikipedia article contains material from "About Us". Barambah Environmental Education Centre. The State of Queensland. under CC-BY-4.0 licence, accessed on 29 May 2019.
