= Widgee Crossing North, Queensland =

Widgee Crossing North
- Suburb
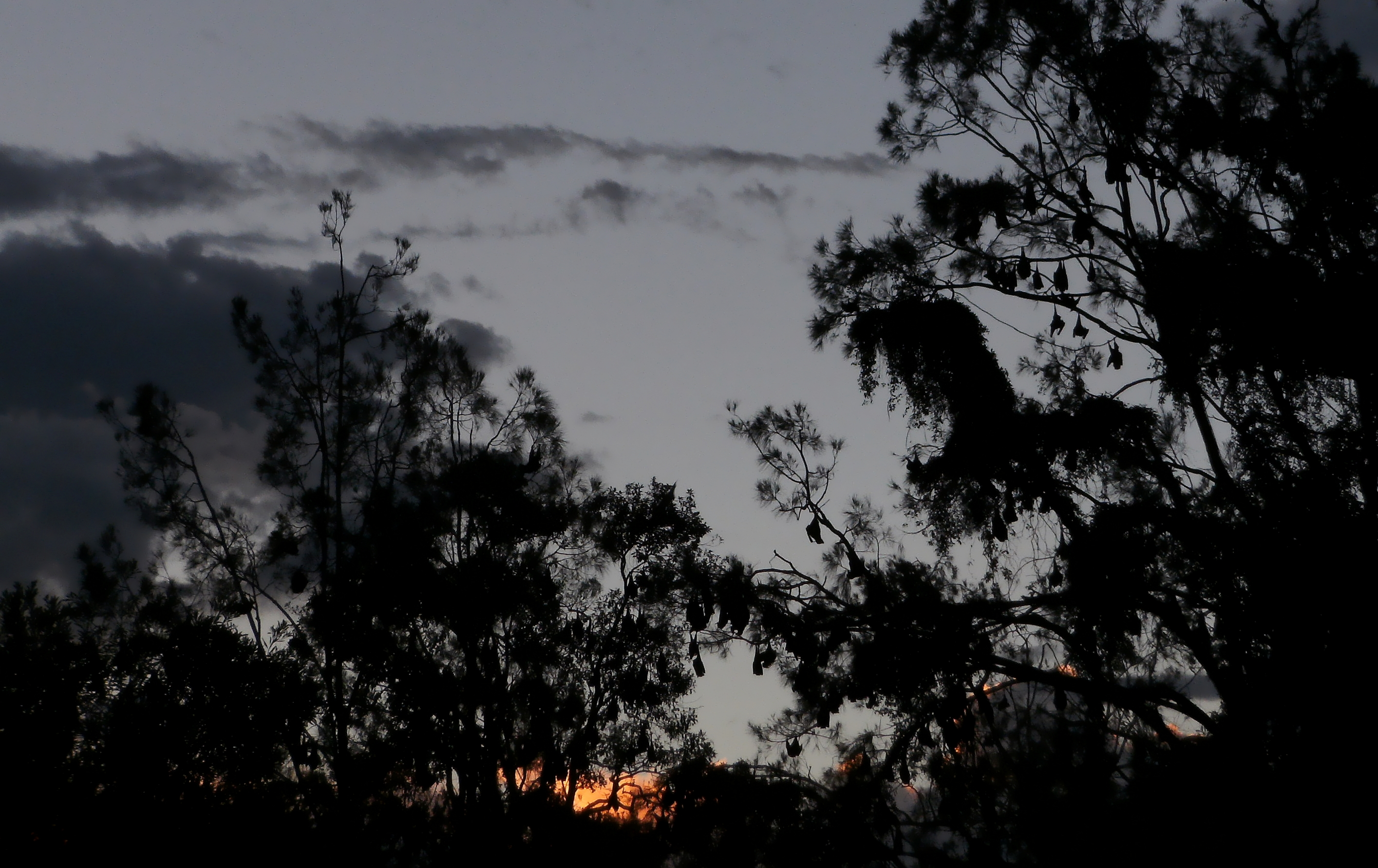
- Grey headed flying foxes waking up and flapping their wings prior to taking off for their feeding grounds along the Mary River

- Interactive map of Widgee Crossing North
- Coordinates: 26.1844°S 152.6247°E
- Country: Australia
- State: Queensland
- LGA: Gympie Region
- Location: 5.8 km (3.6 mi) W of Gympie; 175 km (109 mi) N of Brisbane

Government
  - State electorate: Gympie
  - Federal division: Wide Bay

Area
  - Total: 3.4 km^{2} (1.3 sq mi)

Population
  - Total: 20 (2021 census)
  - Density: 5.9/km^{2} (15/sq mi)
- Time zone: UTC+10:00 (AEST)
- Postcode: 4570
Suburbs around Widgee Crossing North
The Palms	Fishermans Pocket	Two Mile
Widgee Crossing South	Widgee Crossing North	Gympie
Widgee Crossing South	Southside	Southside

Widgee Crossing North is a rural locality in the Gympie Region, Queensland, Australia. In the 2021 census, Widgee Crossing North had a population of 20 people.

== Geography ==
The Mary River forms the western and southern boundaries of the locality.

Widgee Crossing is a ford over the Mary River (26.1919°S 152.6201°E).

The predominant land use is grazing on native vegetation.

== History ==
The two localities of Widgee Crossing North and Widgee Crossing South take their names from the ford over the Mary River. This was an important crossing point during the Gympie gold rush. As the names suggest, Widgee Crossing North is on the northern side of the ford and Widgee Crossing South is on the southern side of the ford. A bridge was built but it was washed away in a flood in the 1960s.

The locality was named and bounded on 1 December 2000.

== Demographics ==
In the 2016 census, Widgee Crossing North had a population of 18 people.

In the 2021 census, Widgee Crossing North had a population of 20 people.

== Heritage listings ==
Widgee Crossing North has the following heritage sites:

- Widgee Crossing Shops (former), 260 Widgee Crossing Road

== Education ==
There are no schools in Widgee Crossing North. The nearest government primary school is Two Mile State School in neighbouring Two Mile to the north-east. The nearest government secondary school is James Nash State High School in neighbouring Gympie to the east.
