= The Webb Brothers (Australian band) =

Country music band (1953–2014)

- Origin: Widgee, Queensland, Australia
- Genre: Country
- Years active: 1953–2014
- Labels: Rodeo Records, Festival Records, W&G Records, ATA Records, RCA Victor
- Past members: Fabian Webb; Marius Webb; Berard Webb

The Webb Brothers were an Australian family country music band originating out of Queensland.

== Early life ==
Fabian (16 July 1930 – 2014), Marius (19 January 1932 – 2014) and Berard (born 4 June 1934) were all born in Gympie, to Mr and Mrs W. S. Webb. The trio grew up in Upper Widgee, on ''Thornside'' Station, a 5000-acre property west of Gympie.

== Career ==
The Webb Brothers was formed in 1953. That same year at the Buddy Williams Show in Gympie, the boys entered Buddy’s talent quest and won first prize – a recording contract with Rodeo Records.

In 1954, the group auditioned for Australia's Amateur Hour and were successful in winning their heat with a massive 13,000 votes from all over Australia.

In 1958, Columbia Records released two of their original songs, ''The Call of the Bellbird'' (written by Berard), which sold 40,000 copies by the end of 1959, and ''Just Sing, Sing, Sing'' (written by Fabian and Marius).

The Gympie Music Muster was first held on 24-26 September 1982. It grew from a plan to celebrate both the centenary of the Webb family's occupation of the rural property Thornside at Widgee, which was selected by George Slater Webb in 1882 combined with celebrating The Webb Brothers' 25 years in the country music industry and their 1982 Golden Guitar Award for their song "Who Put the Roo in the Stew?".

== Discography ==
=== Albums ===
Title	Year	Label	Notes
Clancy Of The Overflow	1959	W&G Records	
Big Country	1972	ATA Records	
I'm Gonna Be A Country Boy Again	1974	ATA Records	
Call Of The Bellbird	1974	Festival Records	
Live In New Zealand	1975	Festival Records	
Town And Country	1976	Festival Records	
Silver Jubilee Album	1982	RCA Records	

=== Singles and EPs ===
Title	Year	Label	Notes
The Call Of The Bell Bird	1958	Philips	
Have I Told You Lately That I Love You	1958	Philips	
The Battle Of New Orleans	1959	Festival Records	
Riding Down From Bangor	1959	Festival Records	
The Jockeys Are Striking	1961	Festival Records	
It Ain't Gonna Rain No Mo' / Courtin' In The Rain	1961	Festival Records	
The Fox	1964	Bluebird	
The Purple Petrol Eater	1966	W & G	
From A Rich Man To A Beggar	1966	W & G	
The Call Of The Bell-Bird	1972	ATA Records	
The Webb Brothers	1973	Hadley Records	
Goondiwindi Grey (The Gunsynd Song)	1973	ATA Records	
The Old Palmer River Song	1974	Festival Records	
June Rose Waltz	1974	ATA Records	
Melodie D'Amour	1976	Festival Records	
The Colonel Put The Lickin' In The Chicken But Who Put The Roo In The Stew	1981	RCA Victor	

== Awards ==
Year	Award giving body	Category	Work	Result
1974	Country Music Awards of Australia	Vocal Group or Duo of the Year	Palmer River Song (Festival)	Won
1982	Country Music Awards of Australia	Top Selling	Who Put The Roo In The Stew	Won
