= Glastonbury, Queensland =

Glastonbury
- Town
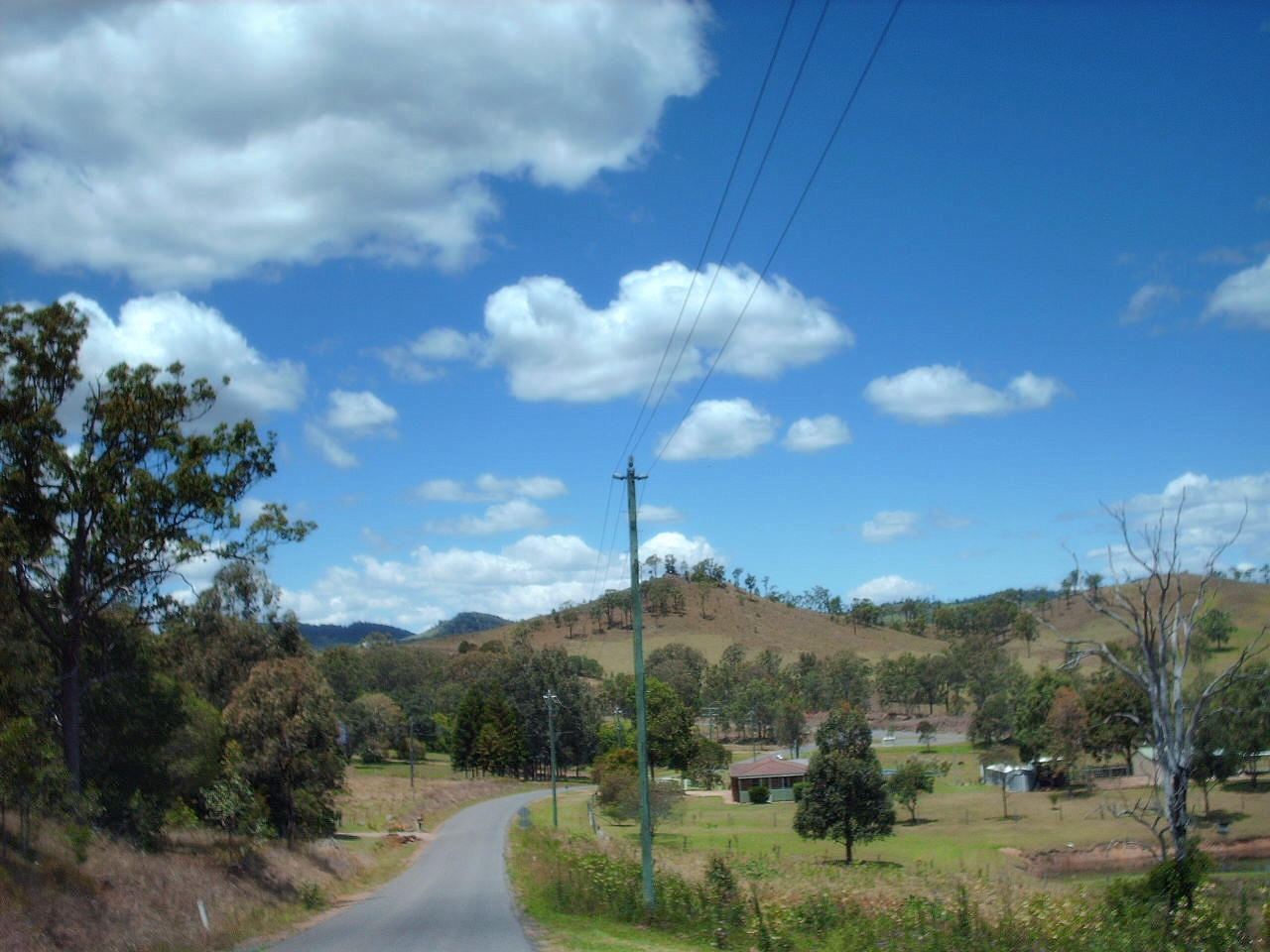
- Country road, Glastonbury

- Interactive map of Glastonbury
- Coordinates: 26.2130°S 152.5197°E
- Country: Australia
- State: Queensland
- LGA: Gympie Region
- Location: 17.4 km (10.8 mi) WSW of Gympie; 182 km (113 mi) N of Brisbane

Government
  - State electorate: Gympie
  - Federal division: Wide Bay

Area
  - Total: 73.6 km^{2} (28.4 sq mi)

Population
  - Total: 365 (2021 census)
  - Density: 4.959/km^{2} (12.844/sq mi)
- Time zone: UTC+10:00 (AEST)
- Postcode: 4570
Localities around Glastonbury
Bells Bridge	Bells Bridge	Fishermans Pocket
Widgee	Glastonbury	The Palms
Widgee	Upper Glastonbury	Scrubby Creek; Marys Creek

Glastonbury is a rural town and locality in the Gympie Region, Queensland, Australia. In the 2021 census, the locality of Glastonbury had a population of 365 people.

== Geography ==
Greendale is a neighbourhood in the north of the locality (26.1833°S 152.5333°E).

== History ==
Glastonbury Provisional School opened on 16 August 1879. On 1 January 1909, it became Glastonbury State School. It closed on 6 June 1960. It was also known as Glastonbury Creek State School. It was on the western corner of intersection of Gordon Street, Betts Street, and Diggins Road (approx 26.21296°S 152.51720°E).

St Joseph's Catholic Church was a timber church built in 1911. In 1926, it was relocated to a more central location in Gordon Street (26.213703°S 152.5173°E), where it was rededicated by Archbishop James Duhig. In 1987, it was closed and sold and converted to a house.

Glastonbury Hall was originally part of the Glastonbury Hotel. In 1931, the community bought the hall.

Greendale Provisional School opened on 21 October 1930, but closed in 1941. It reopened in 1947 and in 1948 became Greendale State School. It closed on 5 June 1960. It was in Greendale near Glastonbury Creek (approx 26.17868°S 152.52552°E).

== Demographics ==
In the 2016 census, the locality of Glastonbury had a population of 351 people.

In the 2021 census, the locality of Glastonbury had a population of 365 people.

== Heritage listings ==
Glastonbury has the following heritage sites:

- Glastonbury Hall, 1329 Glastonbury Road (26.21370°S 152.52114°E)

== Education ==
There are no schools in Glastonbury. The nearest government primary school is Widgee State School in neighbouring Widgee to the west and Gympie South State School in Southside to the east. The nearest government secondary school is James Nash State High School in Gympie to the east. There are also non-government schools in Southside and Gympie.
