= Langshaw, Queensland =

Langshaw
- Suburb
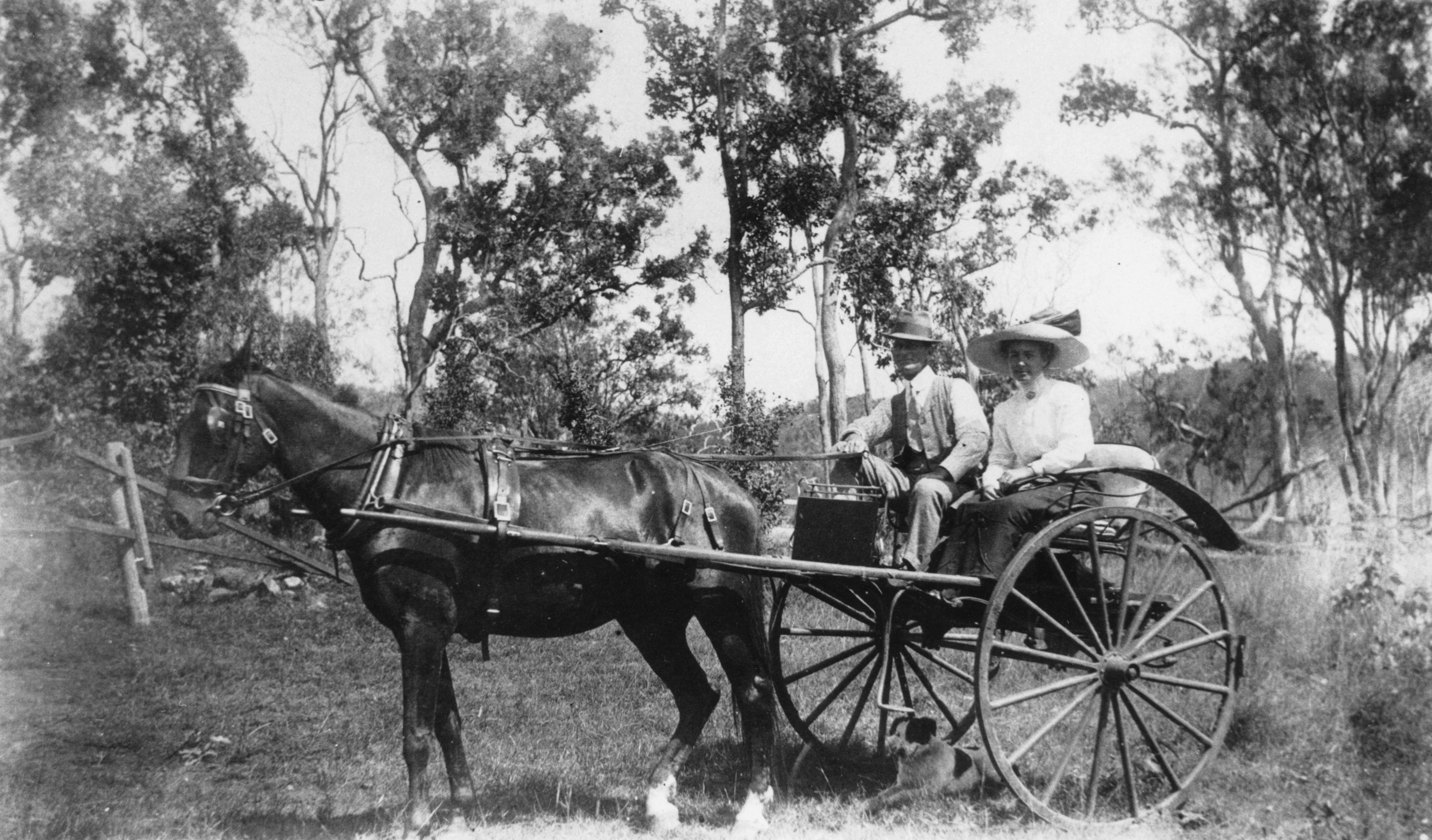
- Raleigh and Lillian Campbell in the buggy at Eel Creek, 1913

- Interactive map of Langshaw
- Coordinates: 26.3013°S 152.5805°E
- Country: Australia
- State: Queensland
- LGA: Gympie Region
- Location: 18.2 km (11.3 mi) SW of Gympie; 187 km (116 mi) N of Brisbane

Government
  - State electorate: Gympie
  - Federal division: Wide Bay

Area
  - Total: 41.8 km^{2} (16.1 sq mi)

Population
  - Total: 167 (2021 census)
  - Density: 3.995/km^{2} (10.35/sq mi)
- Time zone: UTC+10:00 (AEST)
- Postcode: 4570
Suburbs around Langshaw
Upper Glastonbury	Marys Creek	Pie Creek
Upper Glastonbury	Langshaw	Mooloo
Amamoor Creek	Mooloo	Amamoor Creek

Langshaw is a rural locality in the Gympie Region, Queensland, Australia. In the 2021 census, Langshaw had a population of 167 people.

== Geography ==
Langshaw has the following mountains:

- Mount Mooloo (26.3088°S 152.5947°E) 419 metres (1,375 ft)
- Mount Wilwarrel (26.3466°S 152.5719°E) 429 metres (1,407 ft)

== History ==
In 1876, local residents began to lobby for a school. Eel Creek Provisional School opened circa February 1876. In July 1878, there were 16 students enrolled (11 girls and 5 boys). In 1883, the school enrolments were below the minimum threshold. It closed in 1896. It reopened in January 1914 with Miss Louisa Pearl Wise appointed as teacher. On 1 April 1926, it became Eel Creek State School. In 1936, tenders were called to erect a new school building. In 1948, it was renamed Landshaw State School. It closed on 25 August 1962. It was at 1574 Eel Creek Road (26.3032°S 152.5727°E).

Eel Creek Church of Christ opened on Sunday 12 May 1907 on land donated by Mr H Fittell. The building was later relocated to be the Sunday school hall of the Church of Christ at 9 Crescent Street, Gympie.

In 1938, Langshaw Hall was built using materials from the former school building (originally built in 1914).

== Demographics ==
In the 2016 census, Langshaw had a population of 169 people.

In the 2021 census, Langshaw had a population of 167 people.

== Heritage listings ==
Langshaw has the following heritage sites:

- Langshaw Hall, 1571 Upper Eel Creek Road
- former Langshaw State School, 1574 Eel Creek Road

== Education ==
There are no schools in Langshaw. The nearest government primary school is Gympie South State School in Southside to the north-east. The nearest government secondary school is James Nash State High School in Gympie to the north-east.

== Amenities ==
Langshaw Public Hall is at 1571 Eel Creek Road (26.3020°S 152.5734°E).
