= Wodonga House =

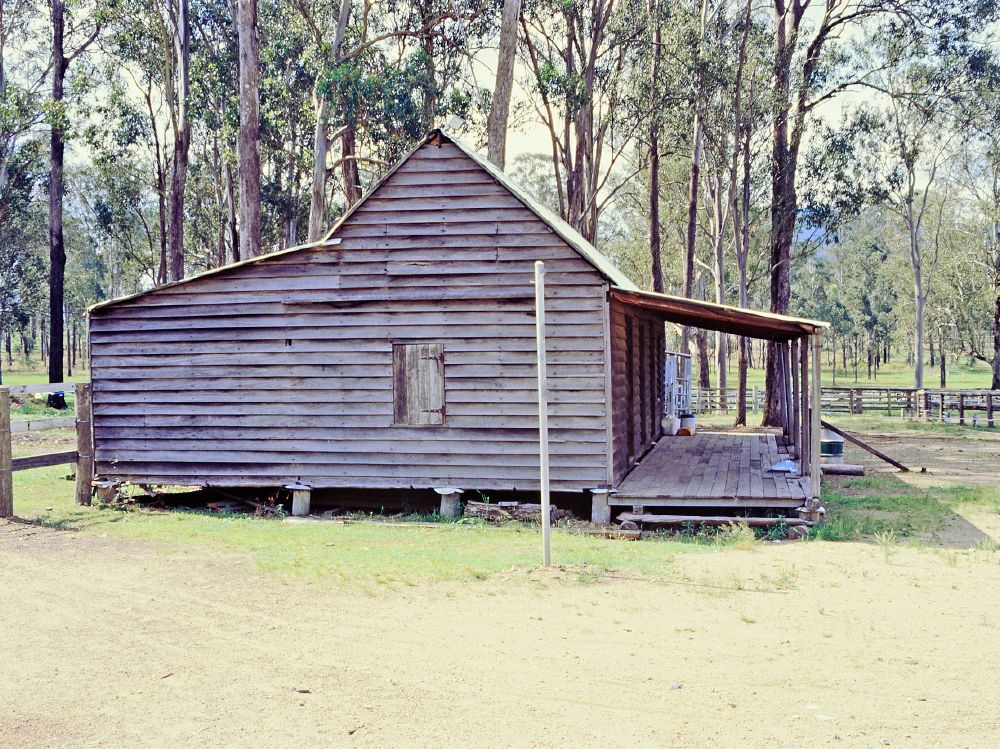
- Wodonga House, 1999

- Location within Queensland Location within Australia
- 26.2023°S 152.4362°E
- Location: Woolooga Road, Widgee, Gympie Region, Queensland, Australia

History
- Design period: 1900 - 1914 (early 20th century)
- Built: 1902

Queensland Heritage Register
- Official name: Wodonga House (former)
- Type: state heritage (built)
- Designated: 21 October 1992
- Reference no.: 600643
- Significant period: 1900s (historical)
- Significant components: farmhouse

Wodonga House is a heritage-listed farmhouse at Woolooga Road, Widgee, Gympie Region, Queensland, Australia. It was built in 1902. It was added to the Queensland Heritage Register on 21 October 1992.

== History ==
The former Wodonga house was constructed on its original site in 1902. The land on which it was located was first settled in 1849 when a number of runs were taken up by W B Tooth and Company. These holdings eventually developed into a cattle property known as Widgee Station.

Government resumptions of Widgee Station began in 1869, and in 1877 James Meakin junior successfully applied for a 640-acre portion, which was to become Wodonga Station. In 1878 an adjoining portion was selected and further land was acquired until 1912 when Wodonga covered 1194 acres, making it one of the largest properties in the district. By January 1882, part of the holding had been transferred to James Meakin senior. The Meakins were cheese makers and also supplied produce to the residents of Gympie.

Prior to 1880, the Meakin brothers constructed the first homestead on the site. In 1887, Wodonga was transferred to Catherine Ellen Hillcoat, wife of John William Hillcoat, manager of Hope Crushing Battery at nearby Black Snake Mineral Field. Hillcoat's son Harold and his wife settled on the property and raised their family of five boys and four girls. The Hillcoats continued the practice of cheese making and dairying and the family lived in the original homestead until 1902, when they constructed the current homestead. The first stage comprised four rooms with a shingle roof. Pine floorboards were brought from the Gympie sawmill in exchange for pine logs from Wodonga. Two rooms were later added and the roof was extended and clad in corrugated iron.

The new building was located adjacent to the existing on the northern side enabling the kitchen to be re-used and eventually connected to the new building. It contained five bedrooms and a sitting room, with the original homestead building retained for use as a schoolroom and accommodation for visitors and workmen. The buildings were surrounded by a picket fence.

Around 1908 the Hillcoats ceased dairying and concentrated on raising beef cattle, supplementing their income by selling possum and kangaroo skins. In 1911–1912 the family worked timber getting in the surrounding area, though the property then reverted to dairying under Percy Pointen who married one of the Hillcoat daughters. When Pointen died the property was sold to the Wodonga Pastoral Company and was used to raise beef cattle again. From 1962 the homestead was unoccupied and became derelict. In August 1978, the homestead building was sold to the Widgee Historical Society and relocated to the Widgee Hall and Recreation Association grounds. Repairs have been carried out and it has been restumped and re-roofed. It is currently used intermittently for community events. The original homestead and kitchen have not survived.

== Description ==
The former Wodonga house is now situated near the clubhouse within the grounds of the Widgee Historical and Recreational Association.

It is a rectangular timber structure set on low stumps with a gabled roof clad in corrugated iron. The roof over the rear section is angled down from the main roof, suggesting it was a verandah that had been extended and built in. The floor joists, studs and rafters are split and adze dressed. An open verandah runs along the front of the building supported on plain timber posts. The building shows evidence of being constructed in stages, the walls containing examples of split slabs, hand dressed chamferboards, pit-sawn weatherboards and machine-sawn boards.

The interior is divided into six main rooms divided by timber walls. It has timber floors and is unceiled.

== Heritage listing ==
Wodonga House was listed on the Queensland Heritage Register on 21 October 1992 having satisfied the following criteria.

The place is important in demonstrating the evolution or pattern of Queensland's history.

The house, formerly at Wodonga, is typical of many small homestead buildings, being built from local materials and showing evidence of being added to and adapted over the years to accommodate the changing needs of its occupants.

The building, as part of the former homestead that was constructed by the Hillcoat family in 1902, has local significance for its association with this family who occupied the original site for many years.

The place is important in demonstrating the principal characteristics of a particular class of cultural places.

The house, formerly at Wodonga, is typical of many small homestead buildings, being built from local materials and showing evidence of being added to and adapted over the years to accommodate the changing needs of its occupants.

The place has a special association with the life or work of a particular person, group or organisation of importance in Queensland's history.

The building, as part of the former homestead that was constructed by the Hillcoat family in 1902, has local significance for its association with this family who occupied the original site for many years.
