= Nahrunda, Queensland =

Nahrunda
- Suburb
- Interactive map of Nahrunda
- Coordinates: 26.2069°S 152.6194°E
- Country: Australia
- State: Queensland
- LGA: Gympie Region
- Location: 6.0 km (3.7 mi) SW of Gympie; 180 km (110 mi) N of Brisbane

Government
  - State electorate: Gympie
  - Federal division: Wide Bay

Area
  - Total: 1.3 km^{2} (0.50 sq mi)

Population
  - Total: 192 (2021 census)
  - Density: 148/km^{2} (383/sq mi)
- Time zone: UTC+10:00 (AEST)
Suburbs around Nahrunda
Widgee Crossing South	Widgee Crossing South	Southside
Widgee Crossing South	Nahrunda	Southside
Widgee Crossing South	Pie Creek	Southside

Nahrunda is a rural locality in the Gympie Region, Queensland, Australia. In the 2021 census, Nahrunda had a population of 192 people.

== Geography ==
The locality is bounded to the north by Glastonbury Road. Eel Creek, a tributary of the Mary River, forms the north-eastern, eastern, and south-eastern boundaries. Litschner Road forms the western boundary.

Silky Oak Drive off Glastonbury Road is the main route through the locality.

The land use is almost entirely rural residential housing.

== Demographics ==
In the 2016 census, Nahrunda had a population of 190 people.

In the 2021 census, Nahrunda had a population of 192 people.

== Education ==
There are no schools in Nahrunda. The nearest government primary school is Gympie South State School in neighbouring Southside to the north-east. The nearest government secondary school is James Nash State High School in Gympie to the north-east. There are also a number of non-government schools in Gympie and its suburbs.

== Amenities ==
Nahrunda Park is at 23 Silky Oak Drive (18.0641°S 145.90780°E). It has a tennis court and a barbecue.
