= Amamoor Forest Reserve =

Protected area in Queensland, Australia

Amamoor State Forest and Forest Reserve
- IUCN category VI (protected area with sustainable use of natural resources)
- Location within Queensland
- Location: Queensland
- Coordinates: 26°22′38″S 152°34′51″E
- Governing body: Queensland Parks and Wildlife Service

The Amamoor State Forest and Forest Reserve is a riverine rainforest in the Gympie Region in Queensland, Australia. The forest is composed of subtropical vegetation dominated by stands of Melia azedarach (white cedar), Toona ciliata (red cedar), Araucaria cunninghamii (hoop pine), and A. bidwillii (bunya pine). The Amamoor Creek within the reserve is noted as a habitat for the platypus and several species of endangered frogs. The park station is located on Amamoor Creek Road about 180 km north of the state capital of Brisbane and 20 km southwest of the town of Gympie. This area has a subtropical climate. The elevation of the terrain is 226 m AMSL.

== Visitor facilities ==
The QPWS operates two camping areas in the forest reserve, both of which are situated on Amamoor Creek. Amamoor Creek Camping Area is the larger and more spacious of the two and is the location of the annual Gympie Music Muster. Cedar Grove Camping Area is quite smaller, yet it still provides a large, open area for large groups of campers. The Amama Day-Use Area provides picnickers with a pleasant, well-facilitated area to enjoy the diverse features of the forest and Amamoor Creek.

== Walking track ==
=== Walks from Amama Day-Use Area ===
Amama Walk (Class 4)

Distance: 1.5 km

Time: Allow 40 minutes

=== Walks from Cedar Grove Camping Area ===
Rainforest Walk (Class 3)

Distance: 1 km

Time: Allow 30 minutes

Cedar Grove Hiking Trail (Class 4)

Distance: 4.6 km

Time: Allow 2–3 hours

=== Walks from Amamoor Creek Camping Area ===
Amamoor Creek Hiking Trail (Class 4)

Distance: 2.5 km

Time: Allow 1 hour

== See also ==
- Protected areas of Queensland
