= Manumbar =

- Suburb
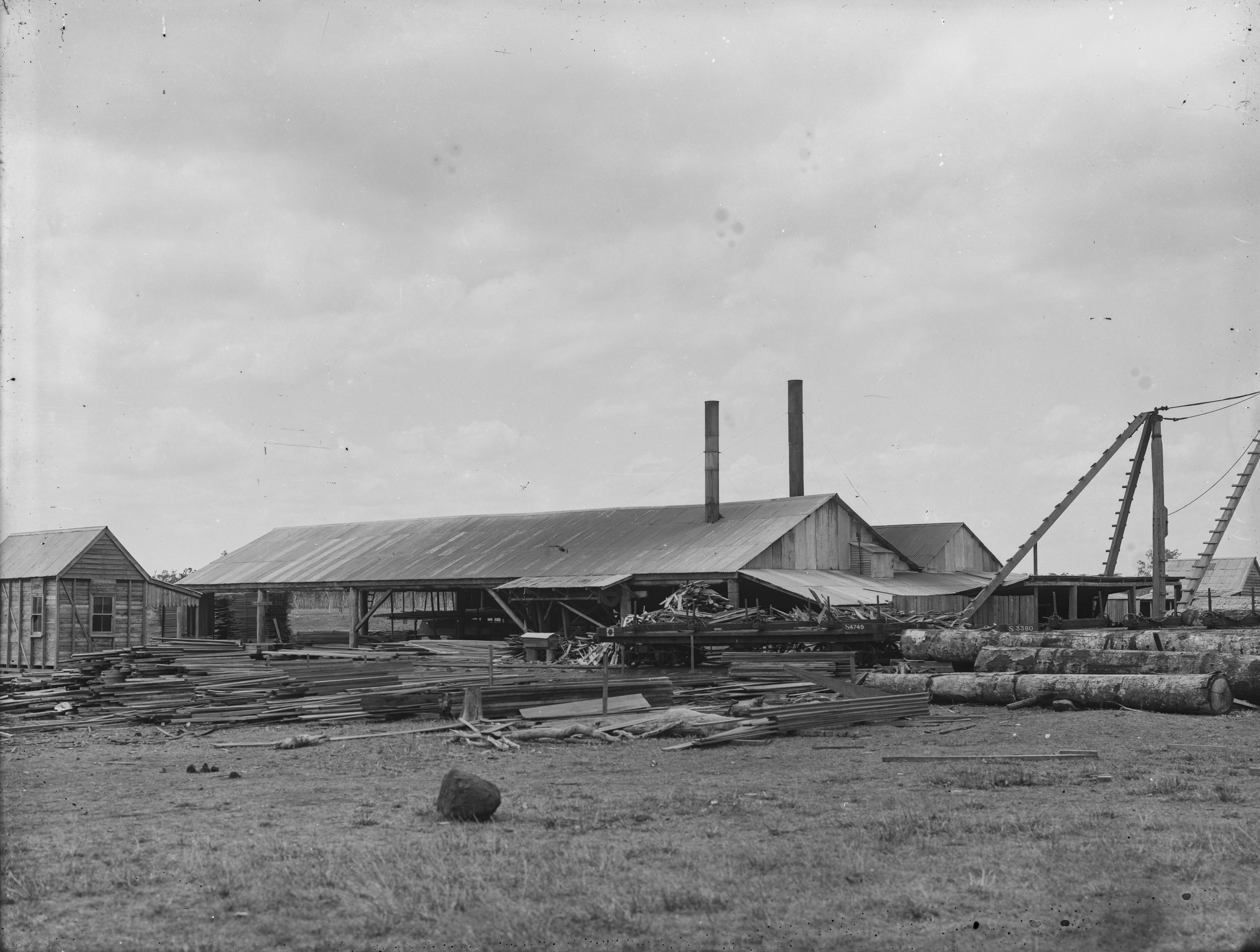
- Sawmill at Manumbar

- Interactive map of Manumbar
- Coordinates: 26.3733°S 152.2844°E
- Country: Australia
- State: Queensland
- LGA: Gympie Region
- Location: 47.4 km (29.5 mi) NE of Nanango; 51.8 km (32.2 mi) SE of Murgon; 85.1 km (52.9 mi) SW of Gympie; 175 km (109 mi) NNW of Brisbane
- Established: 1877

Government
  - State electorate: Nanango
  - Federal division: Wide Bay

Area
  - Total: 263.4 km^{2} (101.7 sq mi)

Population
  - Total: 38 (2021 census)
  - Density: 0.1443/km^{2} (0.374/sq mi)
- Time zone: UTC+10:00 (AEST)
- Postcode: 4601
Suburbs around Manumbar
Kinbombi	Cinnabar	Wrattens Forest
Barambah	Manumbar	Upper Kandanga
Elgin Vale	Mount Stanley	Kingaham

Manumbar is a rural locality in the Gympie Region, Queensland, Australia. In the 2021 census, Manumbar had a population of 38 people.

== Geography ==
There are a number of state forests in Manumbar:

- Jimmys Scrub State Forest, 890.3 hectares (2,200 acres) in the north of the locality (26.3014°S 152.2420°E)
- Kabunga State Forest, 331.8 hectares (820 acres) in the north of the locality (26.2916°S 152.2762°E)
- Gallangowan State Forest, 4,980 hectares (12,300 acres) in the south of the locality (26.4410°S 152.3300°E)

Apart from the state forests, the predominant land use is grazing on native vegetation.

== History ==
The New South Wales Chief Commissioner of Crown Lands accepted the tender in 1855 by John Mortimer and Andrew Anderson for the run called Manumbar. The 16,000 acres had an estimated grazing capability of 4,000 sheep. The triangular block of land was bounded on the west by the station of Toomcul; on the north and east by a range dividing the Mary and Burnett watersheds; and on the south by a high range dividing the waters of the Brisbane and Burnett Rivers. However Mortimer occupied the land from 1848.

In 1861 the pastoral run of Manumbar was the scene of colonial frontier conflict.

Land in Manumbar was open for selection on 17 April 1877; 25 square miles (65 km^{2}) were available.

Manumbar State School opened on 28 July 1924 with the arrival of its first teacher, Lilian Treacy. By 1946, the school had grown to require three teachers, but the closure of the saw mill led to the departure of many families and the school closed on 25 May 1947. It was on the north-east corner of Manumbar Road and Main Creek Road (26.3973°S 152.2767°E). Its buildings were relocated to Manumbar Mill State School in 1949.

Manumbar Mill Provisional School opened on 1 April 1925. In 1943, it became Manumbar Mill State School. Again, the closure of the sawmill resulted in falling student numbers. The school closed on 31 December 1968 with the remaining students being taken by bus to Gallangowan State School. It was on Mill Road (no longer extant, approx 26.4088°S 152.3615°E). The ruins of the mill are to the south of the school site on the other side of Mill Road (approx 26.4105°S 152.3607°E).

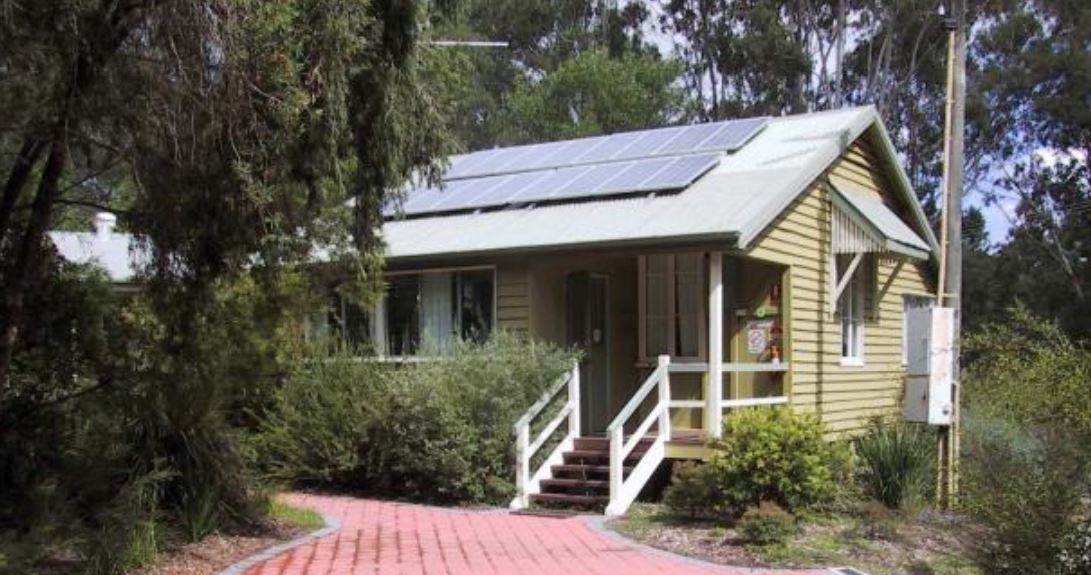
Former Gallangowan State School from Manumbar, now relocated to the Barambah Environmental Education Centre in Wrattens Forest, 2024

Gallangowan State School opened on 8 July 1940 and closed on 21 June 1996. It was in the Gallangowan State Forest near Gallangowan Oval Road (approx 26.4324°S 152.3289°E).

== Demographics ==
In the 2016 census, Manumbar had a population of 53 people.

In the 2021 census, Manumbar had a population of 38 people.

== Economy ==
There are a number of homesteads in the locality:

- Baalgamon (26.4073°S 152.2177°E)
- Court-Le-Roi (26.3609°S 152.2396°E)
- Glenholme (26.3260°S 152.2635°E)
- Manumbar Station (26.3871°S 152.3552°E)
- My Hills (26.3943°S 152.3028°E)
- The Crest (26.4076°S 152.3315°E)
- Vale View (26.3957°S 152.2748°E)
- Wyampa (26.3607°S 152.3032°E)

== Education ==
There are no schools in Manumbar. The nearest government primary schools are Goomeri State School in Goomeri to the north-west, Moffatvale State School in Moffatvale to the west, and Kandanga State School in Kandanga to the east. The nearest government secondary schools are Goomeri State School (to Year 10), Mary Valley State College (to Year 10) in Imbil to the south-east, Nanango State High School (to Year 12) in Nanango to the south-west, and Murgon State High School in Murgon to the north-west.

== Notable residents ==
John Mathew, Presbyterian minister and anthropologist, resided at Manumbar with his uncle John Mortimer. He worked there for six years as a stockrider, bookkeeper, and storeman, becoming familiar with the culture and language of two Aboriginal Australian groups, the Kabi and Wakka Wakka people. The State Library of Queensland holds a notebook containing an Aboriginal vocabulary list by John Mathew and other papers including letters from his uncle John Mortimer and cousin G.W. Anderson of Manumbar Station.
