= Kandanga Creek, Queensland =

Kandanga Creek
- Suburb
- Interactive map of Kandanga Creek
- Coordinates: 26.4013°S 152.6263°E
- Country: Australia
- State: Queensland
- LGA: Gympie Region
- Location: 30.8 km (19.1 mi) SSW of Gympie; 174 km (108 mi) NNW of Brisbane

Government
  - State electorate: Gympie
  - Federal division: Wide Bay

Area
  - Total: 17.3 km^{2} (6.7 sq mi)
- Elevation: 80–300 m (260–980 ft)

Population
  - Total: 129 (2021 census)
  - Density: 7.46/km^{2} (19.31/sq mi)
- Time zone: UTC+10:00 (AEST)
- Postcode: 4570
Suburbs around Kandanga Creek
Amamoor Creek	Amamoor Creek	Amamoor
Upper Kandanga	Kandanga Creek	Kandanga
Upper Kandanga	Imbil	Melawondi

Kandanga Creek is a rural locality in the Gympie Region, Queensland, Australia. In the 2021 census, Kandanga Creek had a population of 129 people.

== Geography ==
Kandanga Creek, the creek from which the locality takes its name, rises in neighbouring Upper Kandanga and enters this locality from the south-west and flows through the locality exiting to the north-east (Kandanga), where it becomes a tributary of the Mary River. The creek forms a valley through the locality from the south-west to the north-east at elevations of 80 to 100 metres (260 to 330 ft) above sea level. On either side of the valley the land rises into more mountainous terrain, rising to 300 metres (980 ft) in the north-west of the locality and 250 metres (820 ft) in the south-west of the locality.

The main land use is grazing on native vegetation.

== History ==
The locality takes its name from the creek, which is a Kabi word, koondangoor meaning mountainous.

Kandanga Creek Provisional School opened on 23 April 1900. On 1 January 1909 it became Kandanga Creek State School. It was mothballed on 31 December 2009 and closed on 31 December 2010. The school was on a 5-acre (2.0 ha) site at 249 Sterling Road (26.4020°S 152.6359°E). It was sold in November 2014 for $341,646. The school's website was archived.

== Demographics ==
In the 2016 census, Kandanga Creek had a population of 118 people.

In the 2021 census, Kandanga Creek had a population of 129 people.

== Heritage listings ==
Kandanga Creek has the following heritage listings:

- Kandanga Creek State School, 249 Sterling Creek Road
- Kandanga Creek Community Hall, 251 Sterling Road
- Former Kandanga Sawmill, 307 Sterling Road (26.4052°S 152.6316°E)

== Education ==
There are no schools in Kandanga Creek. The nearest government primary school is Kandanga State School in neighbouring Kandanga to the east. The nearest government secondary school is Gympie State High School in Gympie to the north.

== Amenities ==
Kandanga Creek Community Hall is at 251 Sterling Road in John Doyle Memorial Park (26.4024°S 152.6351°E).
