= Gympie Music Muster =

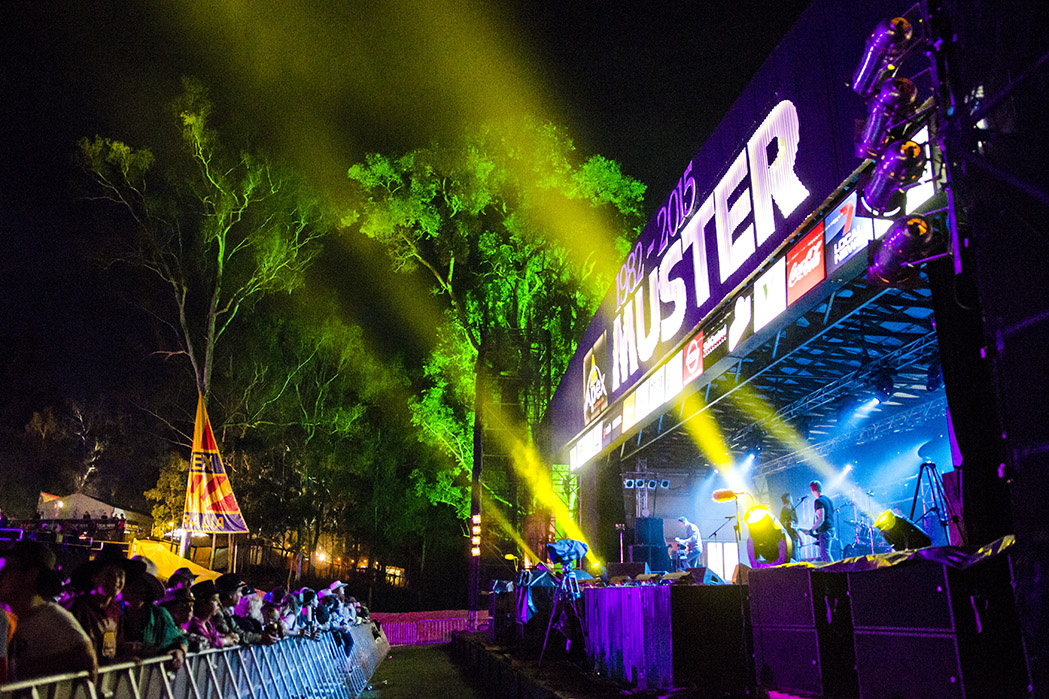
- Main stage at the 2015 Gympie Music Muster
- Genre: Country music Blues; Bluegrass; Folk; Rock; Bush ballad
- Date: Last weekend in August
- Frequency: annually
- Locations: Amamoor Creek near Gympie, Queensland
- Coordinates: 26.3597°S 152.5598°E
- Years active: 1982-2024 (2020 & 2021 cancelled)
- Inaugurated: 1982
- Most recent: 2024
- Attendance: 50,000 (2024)
- Organiser: Apex Club of Gympie
- Website: www.muster.com.au

The Gympie Music Muster is an Australian music festival held in and around the Amamoor Creek State Forest at Amamoor Creek near Gympie, Queensland, Australia.

The Muster started as a community fundraiser in 1982 and has now grown to a four-day festival attracting musicians from across Australia and internationally.

A fundraising initiative of the Apex Club of Gympie, the Muster is a registered charity with all profits distributed among worthy community groups and charity partners, both locally and nationally. In total the Muster has raised more than 20 million.

== History ==
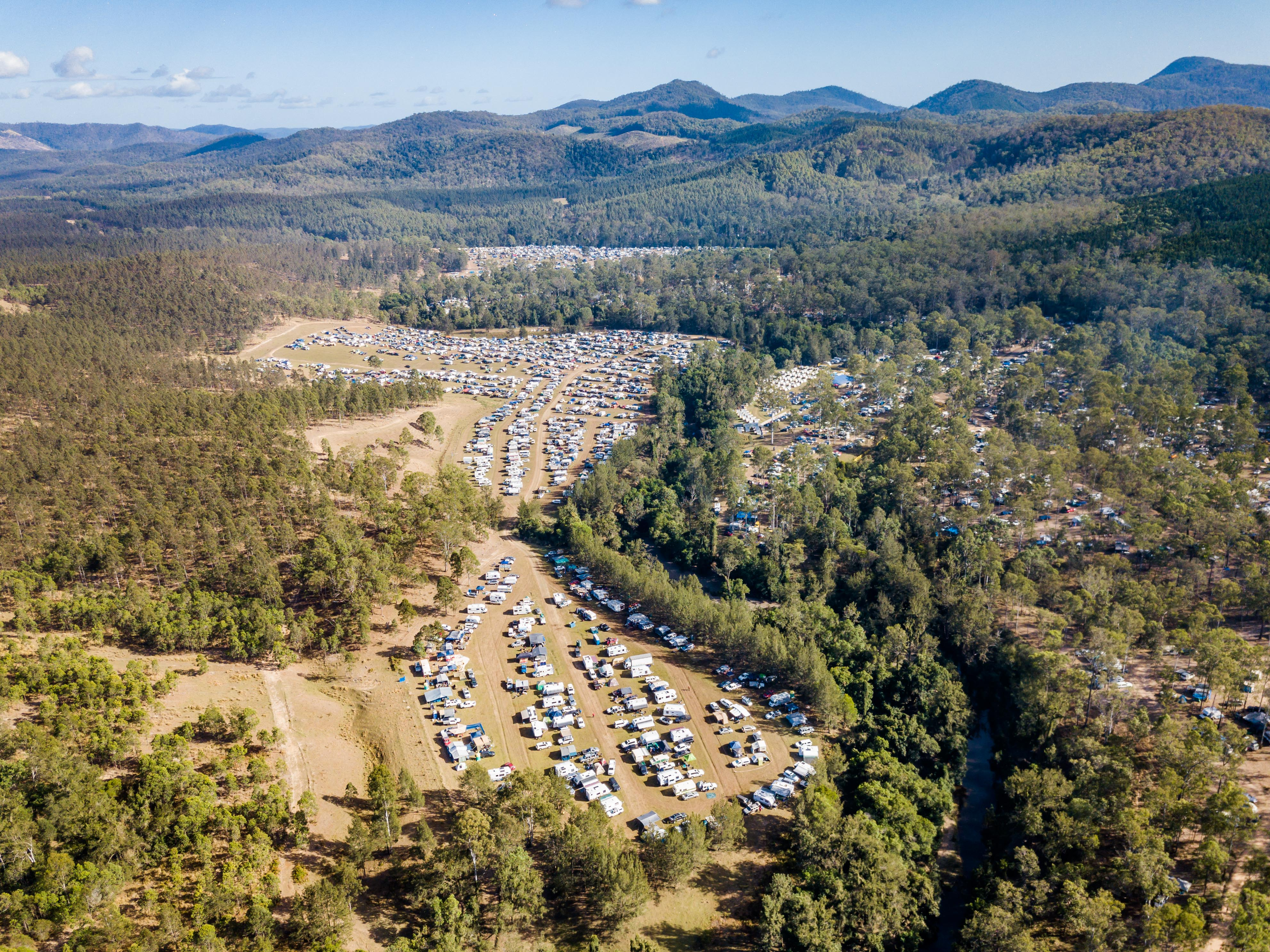
Aerial view of the Gympie Music Muster

The Gympie Music Muster was first held on 24–26 September 1982. It grew from a plan to celebrate both the centenary of the Webb family's occupation of the rural property Thornside at Widgee, which was selected by George Slater Webb in 1882, combined with celebrating The Webb Brothers' 25 years in the country music industry and their 1982 Golden Guitar Award for their song "Who Put the Roo in the Stew?".

In 2009 as part of the Q150 celebrations, the Gympie Music Muster was announced as one of the Q150 Icons of Queensland for its role as an "event and festival".

The 2015 Gympie Muster attracted a crowd of over 23,000.

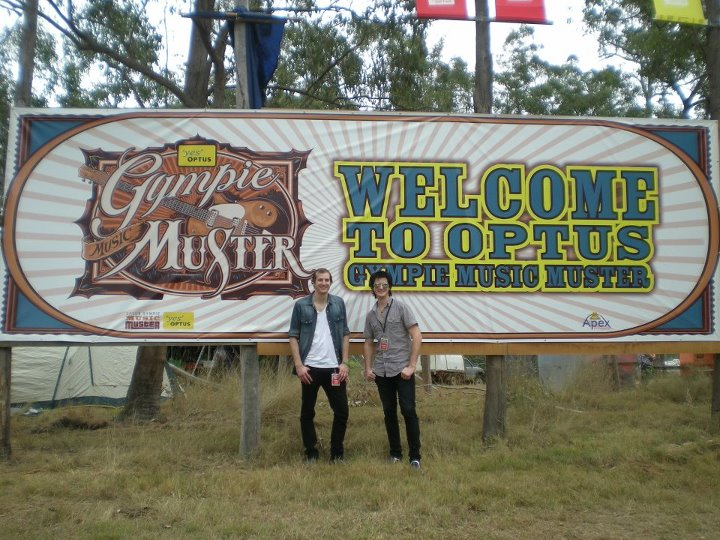
Jay Seeney and Aaron Jobst at the Gympie Muster

In 2020 the event was cancelled due to the COVID-19 pandemic in Australia. In 2021 the Muster was cancelled again due to COVID restrictions, the Queensland–New South Wales border being closed on 23 June. Greg Cavanagh, chairman of Gympie Music Muster, said in 2021 "We would put the entire future of this festival in jeopardy if we charged ahead this year ….", and "… it was simply too risky with most patrons and artists coming from outside of Queensland". The line-up in 2021 was to feature all Australian artists including: Troy Cassar-Daley, Kasey Chambers, Graeme Connors, Lee Kernaghan and Busby Marou.

In 2024, the Gympie Music Muster had its highest ever attendance with 50,000 people. The performers included The Wet Whistles, the Sons of Atticus, the Zac Cross Band and the Tony Q Band.

== See also ==
- List of country music festivals
- List of festivals in Australia
- Country music
