= Amamoor =

- Town
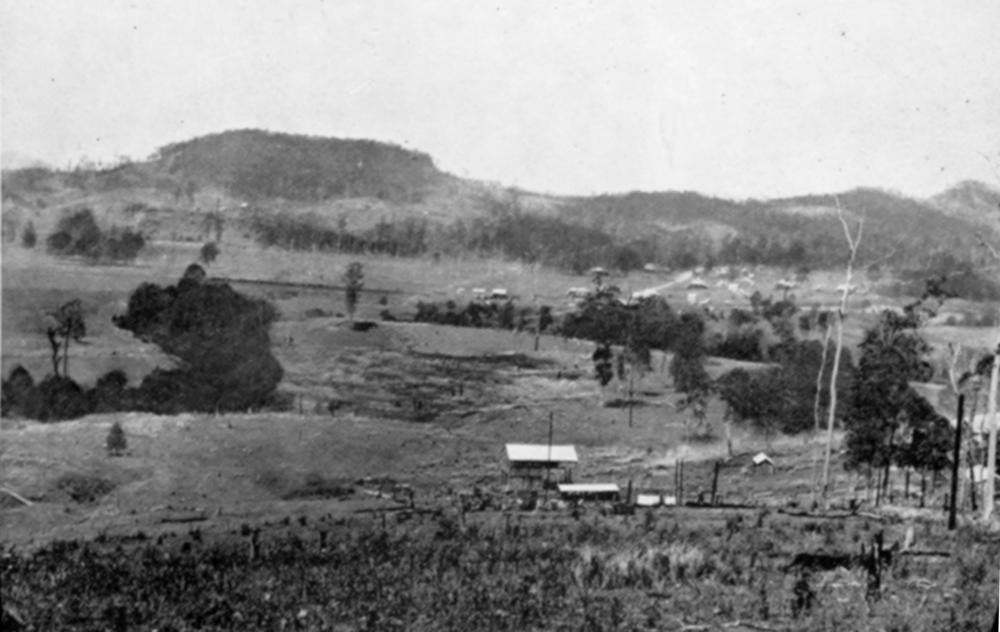
- Amamoor township, circa 1931

- Interactive map of Amamoor
- Coordinates: 26.3452°S 152.675°E
- Country: Australia
- State: Queensland
- LGA: Gympie Region
- Location: 14.6 km (9.1 mi) N of Imbil; 21.0 km (13.0 mi) S of Gympie; 164 km (102 mi) NNW of Brisbane

Government
  - State electorate: Gympie
  - Federal division: Wide Bay

Area
  - Total: 34.5 km^{2} (13.3 sq mi)

Population
  - Total: 720 (2021 census)
  - Density: 20.87/km^{2} (54.1/sq mi)
- Time zone: UTC+10:00 (AEST)
- Postcode: 4570
Localities around Amamoor
Calico Creek	Dagun	Kybong
Amamoor Creek	Amamoor	Coles Creek
Kandanga Creek	Kandanga	Kandanga

Amamoor is a rural town and locality in the Gympie Region, Queensland, Australia. In the 2021 census, the locality of Amamoor had a population of 720 people.

== Geography ==
Amamoor is 18 kilometres (11 mi) south of Gympie. The Bruce Highway passes to the east of the town and the Amamoor Forest Reserve is to the west.

Amamoor is situated on the Amamoor Creek which is a tributary of the Mary River. It is one of a chain of towns in the Mary Valley also including Imbil, Dagun, and Kandanga.

== History ==
The town is named after a pastoral run held by J.D. McTaggart in the late 1850s. It is an Aboriginal word meaning swimming in water or a swimming creek.

When the construction of a railway line between Brisbane and Gympie was being contemplated in 1884–5, one of the routes being considered was through the Mary Valley. However, this was not the route chosen, and the residents of the valley who were disappointed at missing out on rail connection agitated for many years until the Mary Valley branch line was built. The first section south from Monkland to Kandanga (via Amamoor) was completed in October 1914 with Amamoor railway station (26.3432°S 152.6741°E) serving the locality. The second stage to Brooloo was completed in April 1915. The final stage to Kenilworth was to be built in 1920 but was never completed.

In October 1912, local people met to request a school in Diamond Field. In August 1913, the Queensland Government decided to establish a school. Diamond Field State School opened on 26 November 1913 under head teacher Miss Emily Mary Appleton. The school closed on 2 March 1939, due to the opening of Forest Station State School in Amamoor Creek. It was on the eastern side of Diamondfield Road (approx 26.3640°S 152.6550°E).

Amamoor Post Office opened around 1920.

Amamoor State School opened on 10 October 1921. In 1949 the former Bollier State School building was relocated to Amarmoor State School. Aramoor State School was relocated to its current location in Elizabeth Street in the 1950s.

A Methodist church opened in 1935 at 9 Busby Road (26.3449°S 152.6749°E), later becoming Amamoor Uniting Church. It closed in 2017.

On Mother's Day 1986, six families held the first service of a newly formed Wesleyan Methodist congregation. Initially they met in a farmhouse until they purchased and converted an industrial building into the Mary Valley Wesleyan Methodist Church.

In 1993, the services on the Mary Valley railway line were reduced, terminating at Melawondi, and the entire line was closed in 1994, ending Amamoor's rail connection.

== Demographics ==
In the 2016 census, the locality of Amamoor had a population of 636 people.

In the 2021 census, the locality of Amamoor had a population of 720 people.

== Heritage listings ==
Amamoor has heritage-listed sites, including:

- Aramoor Cream Shed at the former Aramoor railway station, one of the Mary Valley Railway Cream Sheds, Aramoor Street (26.34706°S 152.67320°E)
- Amamoor General Store, 4 Busby Street (26.34386°S 152.67310°E)
- Amamoor Butcher Shop, 10 Busby Street (26.34448°S 152.67376°E)
- Amamoor Hall, 31-33 Busby Street (26.34609°S 152.67581°E)
- Amamoor State School, 2 Elizabeth Road (26.34706°S 152.67320°E)

== Education ==
Amamoor State School is a government primary (Prep-6) school for boys and girls at 2 Elizabeth Street (26.3464°S 152.6731°E). In 2018, the school had an enrolment of 78 students with 7 teachers (5 full-time equivalent) and 6 non-teaching staff (4 full-time equivalent).

There are no secondary schools in Amamoor. The nearest government secondary school is Mary Valley State College in Imbil to the south, but it only offers secondary schooling to Year 10. For secondary schooling to Year 12, the nearest government secondary school is Gympie State High School in Gympie to the north.

== Amenities ==
Mary Valley Wesleyan Methodist Church is at 198 Amamoor Dagun Road (26.3354°S 152.66483°E). It is part of the Wesleyan Methodist Church of Australia.

== Events ==
Amamoor Creek State Forest Park is host to the annual Gympie Muster, a country music festival.

== Attractions ==
The Amamoor railway station is part of the Mary Valley Rattler.
