= Widgee =

- Suburb
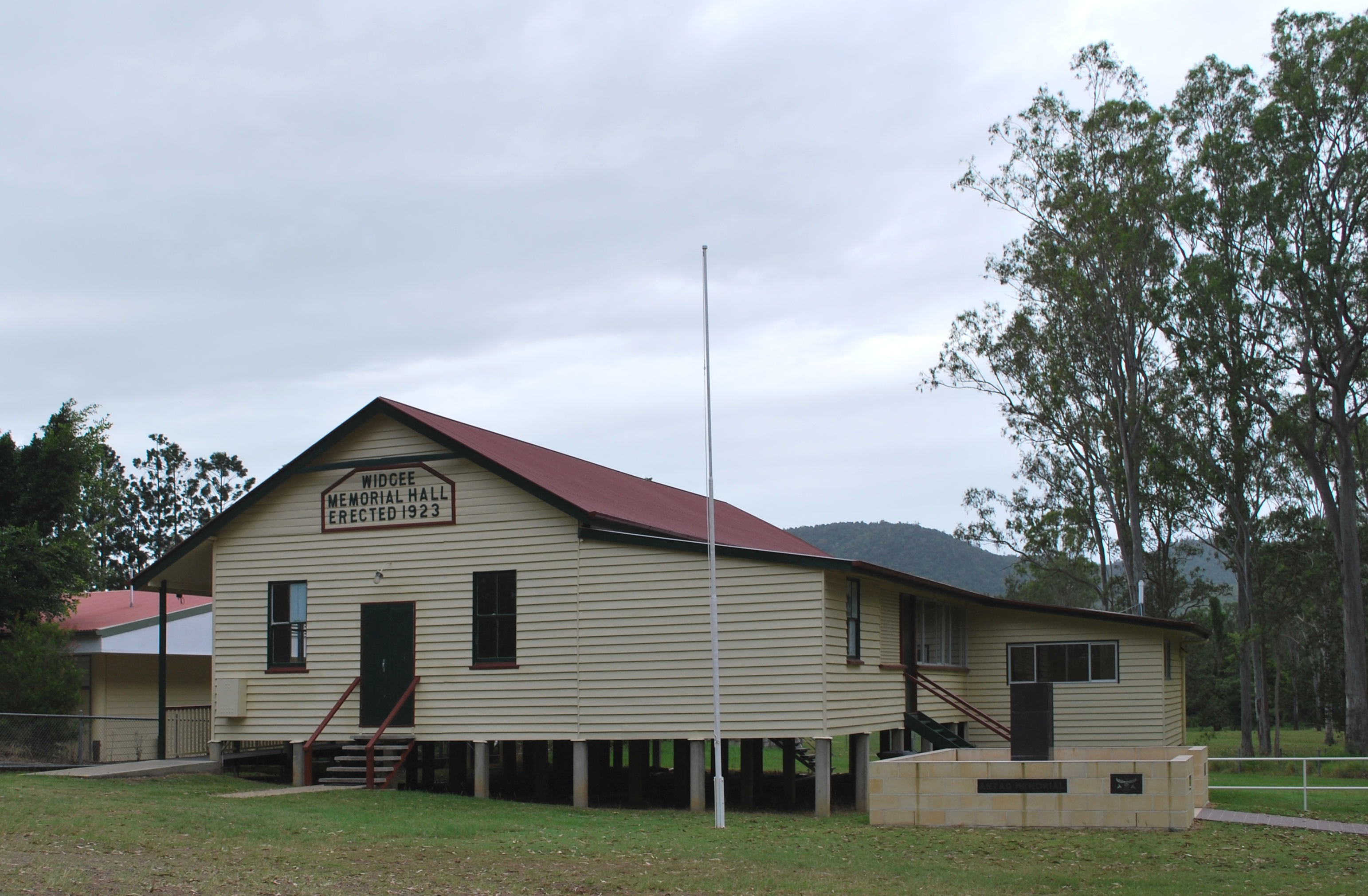
- Soldiers' Memorial hall

- Interactive map of Widgee
- Coordinates: 26.2163°S 152.42°E
- Country: Australia
- State: Queensland
- LGA: Gympie Region
- Location: 24.8 km (15.4 mi) W of Gympie; 199 km (124 mi) NNW of Brisbane

Government
  - State electorate: Gympie
  - Federal division: Wide Bay

Area
  - Total: 197.8 km^{2} (76.4 sq mi)

Population
  - Total: 862 (2021 census)
  - Density: 4.358/km^{2} (11.287/sq mi)
- Time zone: UTC+10:00 (AEST)
- Postcode: 4570
Suburbs around Widgee
Oakview	Lower Wonga	Bells Bridge
Black Snake	Widgee	Glastonbury
Wrattens Forest	Wrattens Forest	Upper Glastonbury

Widgee is a rural locality in the Gympie Region, Queensland, Australia. In the 2021 census, Widgee had a population of 862 people.

== History ==
The name is believed to have originated from the Aboriginal words Witchee Witchee meaning listen or hark.

In 1887, 43,000 acres (17,000 ha) of land were resumed from the Widgee Widgee pastoral run. The land was offered for selection for the establishment of small farms on 17 April 1887.

Widgee Provisional School opened on 11 July 1892, presumably in temporary premises, as tenders to erect a building were not called until April 1893. It became Widgee State School on 1 January 1909. A new school building was built in 1913. It was closed in 1921. It was near Station Creek (approx 26.19787°S 152.41702°E).

On 10 August 1912 at the Lands Office at Gympie, the Queensland Government offered for selection 48 agricultural lots in the Widgee Repurchased Estate. The lots ranged in size from 160 to 758 acres (65 to 307 ha), in total 20,266 acres (8,201 ha). 17 blocks were situated around Waroonga Creek to the north-west of Widgee Mountain (26.2428°S 152.3731°E) while 31 blocks were situated to south around Widgee Creek and Little Widgee Creek. The blocks were described as suitable for dairying and general farming with an average annual rainfall of 40 inches (1,000 mm).

The Widgee Soldiers' Memorial Hall was officially opened in the presence of 300 people on Saturday 31 March 1923 by Harry Clayton, the Member for the local electoral district of Wide Bay in the Queensland Legislative Assembly. The opening of the hall enabled the school to re-open using the hall until 1938 when a new school was built beside the hall.

On Sunday 27 March 1938, a stump-capping ceremony was performed for a Catholic church on land donated by Mrs W. Power of Widgee. The church was officially opened and dedicated to St Vincent de Paul on Sunday 25 September 1938 by Archbishop James Duhig in the presence of 500 residents. The timber church was 60 by 30 feet (18.3 by 9.1 m) and could seat 100 people; it cost £674.

== Demographics ==
In the 2011 census, Widgee had a population of 788 people.

In the 2016 census, Widgee had a population of 794 people.

In the 2021 census, Widgee had a population of 862 people.

== Heritage listings ==
Widgee has a number of heritage-listed sites, including:

- Wodonga House, Woolooga Road, Upper Widgee (26.2023°S 152.4362°E)

== Education ==
Widgee State School is a government primary (Prep-6) school for boys and girls at 2156 Gympie-Woolooga Road (26.2038°S 152.4431°E). In 2017, the school had an enrolment of 52 students with 4 teachers (3 full-time equivalent) and 6 non-teaching staff (3 full-time equivalent).

There are no secondary schools in Widgee; the nearest one is James Nash State High School in Gympie.

== Amenities ==
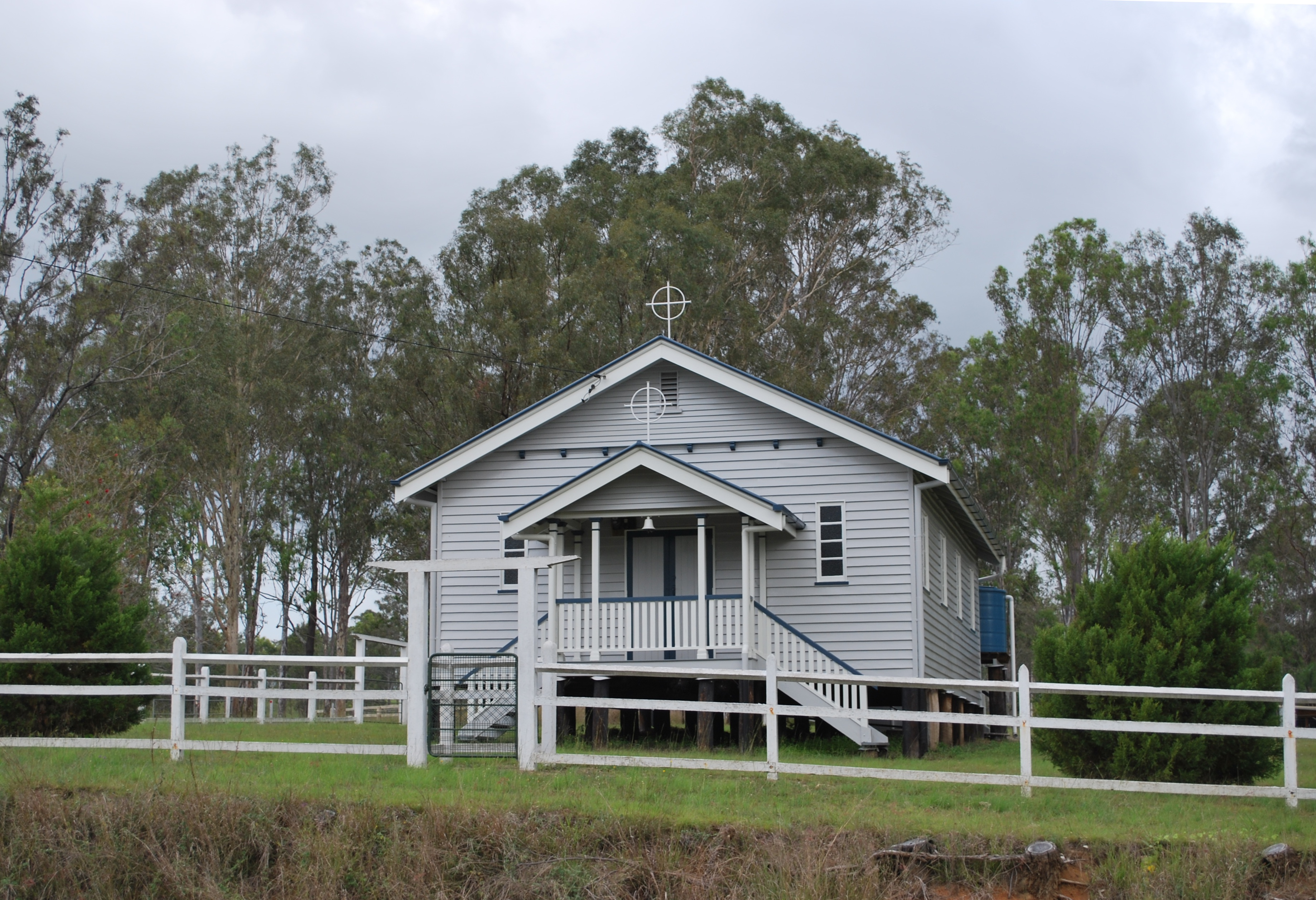
St Vincent de Paul Catholic Church, 2010

St Vincent de Paul Catholic Church is on the south-west corner of Gympie Woolooga Road and Little Widgee Road (26.20419°S 152.44243°E).

The Soldiers' Memorial Hall is at 2148 Gympie Woolooga Road (26.20391°S 152.44380°E). Inside the hall, an honour board commemorates those who served in World War I, World War II and the Vietnam War. Outside the hall, a war memorial also commemorates those who served in the conflicts.

Widgee Showgrounds are at 22 Upper Widgee Road (26.20197°S 152.43687°E). The Widgee & District Pony Club is located there.

== Notable people ==
- Tino Fa'asuamaleaui - Queensland and Australia Rugby League Player.
