= Southside, Queensland =

Southside Gympie, Queensland
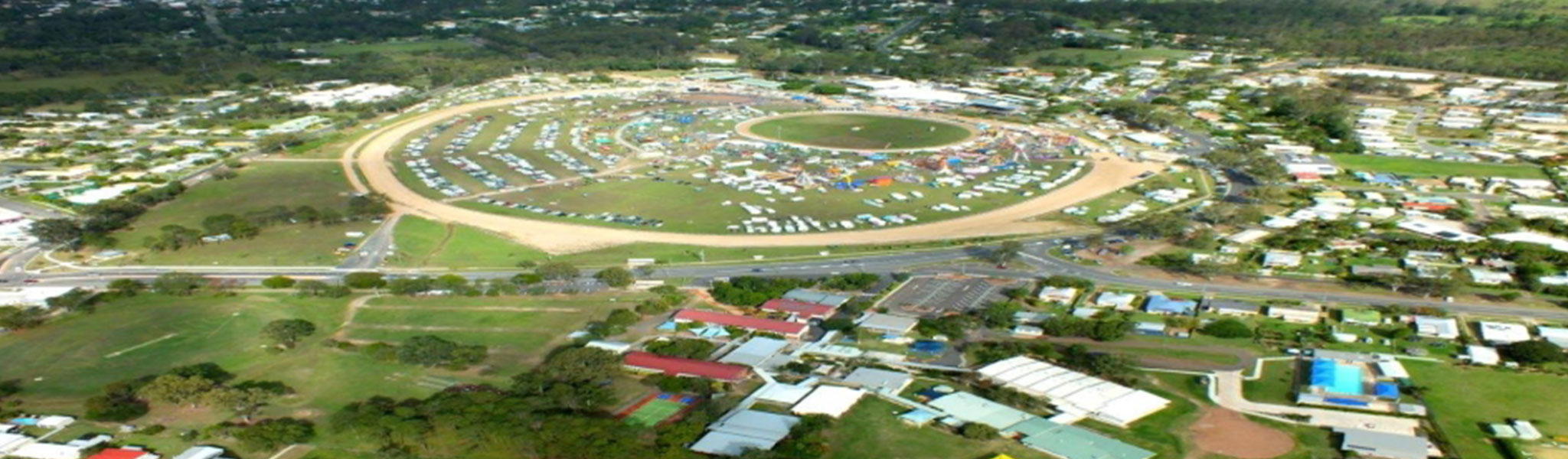
- View over Southside (from the school across the showgrounds)

- Coordinates: 26.2111°S 152.6458°E
- Population: 6,312 (2021 census)
  - Density: 339.4/km^{2} (878.9/sq mi)
- Postcode(s): 4570
- Area: 18.6 km^{2} (7.2 sq mi)
- Time zone: AEST (UTC+10:00)
- Location: 3.9 km (2 mi) SW of Gympie; 168 km (104 mi) N of Brisbane
- LGA(s): Gympie Region
- State electorate(s): Gympie
- Federal division(s): Wide Bay
Suburbs around Southside:
Widgee Crossing North; Widgee Crossing South	Gympie	Gympie
Nahrunda	Southside	Monkland
Pie Creek	Jones Hill	Jones Hill

Southside is a semi-rural locality in the Gympie Region, Queensland, Australia. In the 2021 census, Southside had a population of 6,312 people.

== Geography ==
Southside is on the south-western bank of the Mary River. Its name reflects its location south of the Gympie town centre.

== History ==
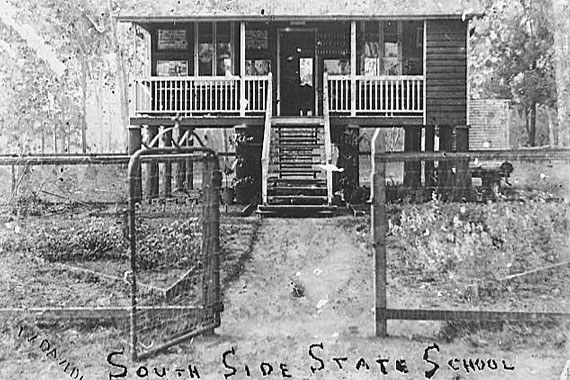
South Side State School (now Gympie South State School)

The locality was originally known as Gympie South.

Gympie South Side State School opened on 4 July 1910. On 13 May 1954, it was renamed Gympie South State School.

In November 1937, the Methodist Church at Chatsworth was relocated to a new 0.5-acre (0.20 ha) site adjacent to the South Side State School (about 6 miles (9.7 km) away, where it was officially opened by Reverend Ira Menear. It originally opened as Chatsworth Wesleyan Methodist Church opened on Sunday 16 August 1885 and was on the Chatsworth Road (now the Bruce Highway).

Cooloola Christian College opened in 1992.

Gympie Wesleyan Methodist Church opened on 15 January 2006. A congregation was formed as a church plant of the Mary Valley Wesleyan Methodist Church (based in Amamoor) in March 1990. Services were initially held in the CWA hall in Gympie, before moving 3km to another hall. In February 2003 the congregation purchased a 2-acre (0.81 ha) block in a residential development in Southside, holding its first service in its newly constructed church on 15 January 2006.

== Demographics ==
In the 2006 census, Southside had a population of 4,838 people.

In the 2016 census, Southside had a population of 5,737 people.

In the 2021 census, Southside had a population of 6,312 people.

== Heritage listings ==
Southside has the following heritage listings:

- Southside State School (now Gympie South State School), 50 Exhibition Road

== Education ==
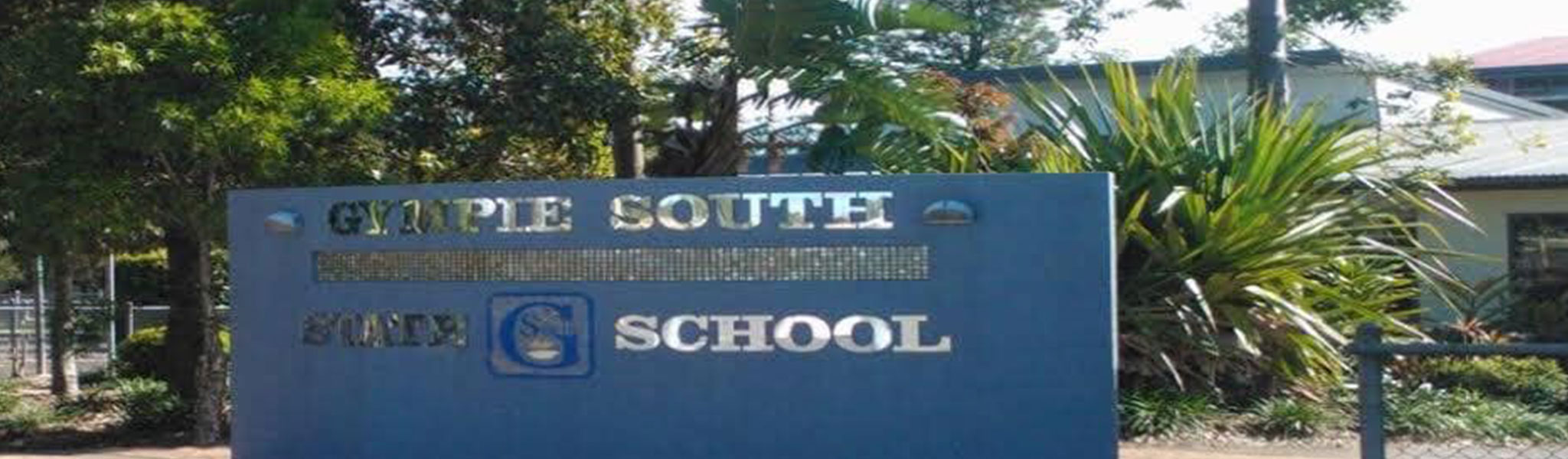
Gympie South State School sign

Gympie South State School is a government primary (Prep-6) school for boys and girls at 50 Exhibition Road (26.1998°S 152.6454°E). In 2017, the school had an enrolment of 532 students with 45 teachers (38 full-time equivalent) and 34 non-teaching staff (20 full-time equivalent). It includes a special education program.

Cooloola Christian College is a private primary and secondary (Prep-12) school for boys and girls at 1 College Road (26.1981°S 152.6421°E). In 2017, the school had an enrolment of 396 students with 38 teachers (33 full-time equivalent) and 33 non-teaching staff (24 full-time equivalent). It is operated by a not-for-profit company established by four churches: Baptist Church, Church of Christ, Presbyterian Church and Wesleyan Methodist Church.

There is no government secondary school in Southside. The nearest government secondary schools are Gympie State High School and James Nash State High School both located in neighbouring Gympie to the north and north-east.

== Facilities ==
Glastonbury SES Facility is at 1 Rodian Street (26.2064°S 152.6484°E).

== Amenities ==
Gympie Wesleyan Methodist Church is at 70 Exhibition Road (26.2022°S 152.6436°E). It is part of the Wesleyan Methodist Church of Australia.

The Gympie Corps of the Salvation Army is at 42 Stumm Road (26.1954°S 152.6458°E).

Gympie Christian Fellowship has its church at 2A Sorensen Road (26.2136°S 152.6658°E). It is an outreach church of Sunshine Coast Christian Fellowship in Forest Glen.

Gympie Ward of the Church of Jesus Christ of Latter-day Saints meets at 28 Sorensen Road (26.2155°S 152.6620°E).

Gympie Racecourse and the Adrian McClintock Park showgrounds are at 77 Exhibition Road (26.2032°S 152.6466°E). The park is named after a former mayor of the Shire of Widgee.

Gunabul Homestead Golf Course is an 18-hole golf course and driving range at 9 Power Road (26.1995°S 152.6569°E).
