= Gympie Region =

Coordinates: 26°11′23″S 152°39′53″E

- Local government area
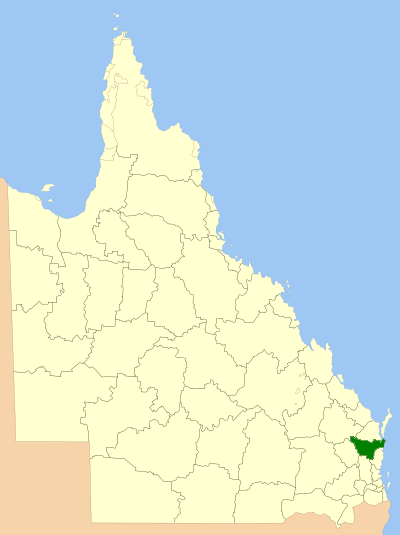
- Location within Queensland

- Interactive map of Gympie Region
- Country: Australia
- State: Queensland
- Region: Wide Bay–Burnett
- Established: 2008
- Council seat: Gympie

Government
  - Mayor: Glen Hartwig
  - State electorates: Gympie; Maryborough; Callide
  - Federal division: Wide Bay

Area
  - Total: 6,884 km^{2} (2,658 sq mi)

Population
  - Total: 53,242 (2021 census)
  - Density: 7.7342/km^{2} (20.0314/sq mi)
- Website: Gympie Region
LGAs around Gympie Region
North Burnett	Fraser Coast	Fraser Coast
South Burnett	Gympie Region	Coral Sea
South Burnett	Somerset	Noosa

The Gympie Region is a local government area in the Wide Bay–Burnett region of Queensland, Australia, about 170 kilometres (110 mi) north of Brisbane, the state capital. It is between the Sunshine Coast and Hervey Bay and centred on the town of Gympie. It was created in 2008 from a merger of the Shires of Cooloola and Kilkivan and part of the Shire of Tiaro.

The Regional Council, which governs the Region, has an estimated operating budget of A$50 million.

In the 2021 census, the Gympie Region had a population of 53,242 people.

== History ==
Gubbi Gubbi (Kabi Kabi, Cabbee, Carbi, Gabi Gabi) is an Australian Aboriginal language spoken on Gubbi Gubbi country. The Gubbi Gubbi language region includes the landscape within the local government boundaries of the Sunshine Coast Region and Gympie Region, particularly the towns of Caloundra, Noosa Heads, Gympie and extending north towards Maryborough and south to Caboolture.

Prior to the 2008 amalgamation, the Gympie Region existed as four distinct local government areas:

- the Shire of Cooloola;
  - the City of Gympie;
  - the Shire of Widgee;
- the Shire of Kilkivan;
- and Division 3 (Theebine/Gunalda areas) of the Shire of Tiaro.

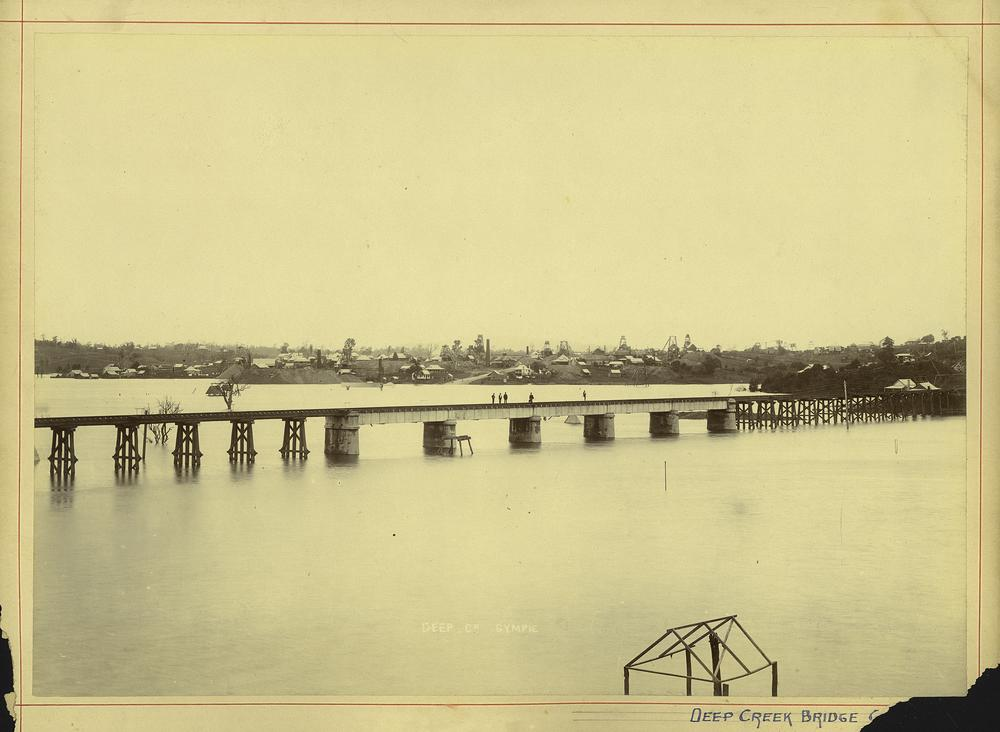
Deep Creek Bridge, 1893

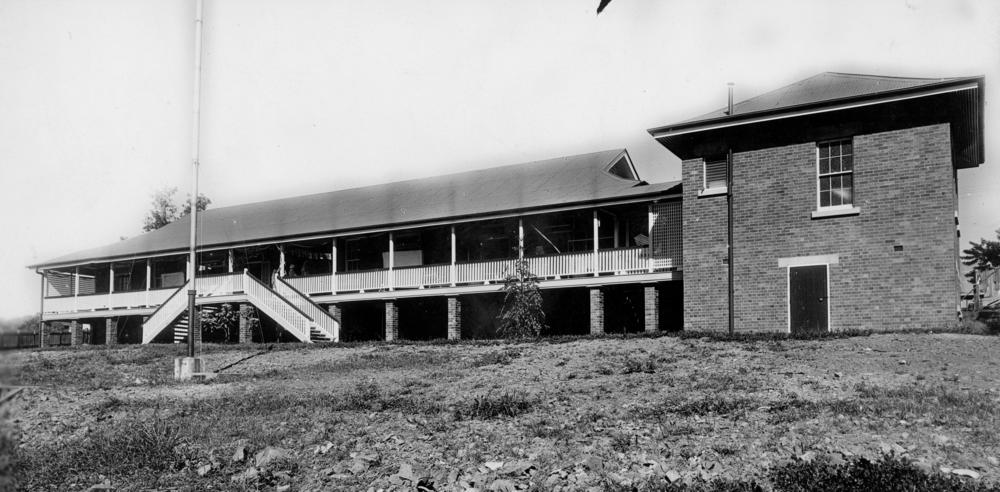
Gympie General Hospital, 1935

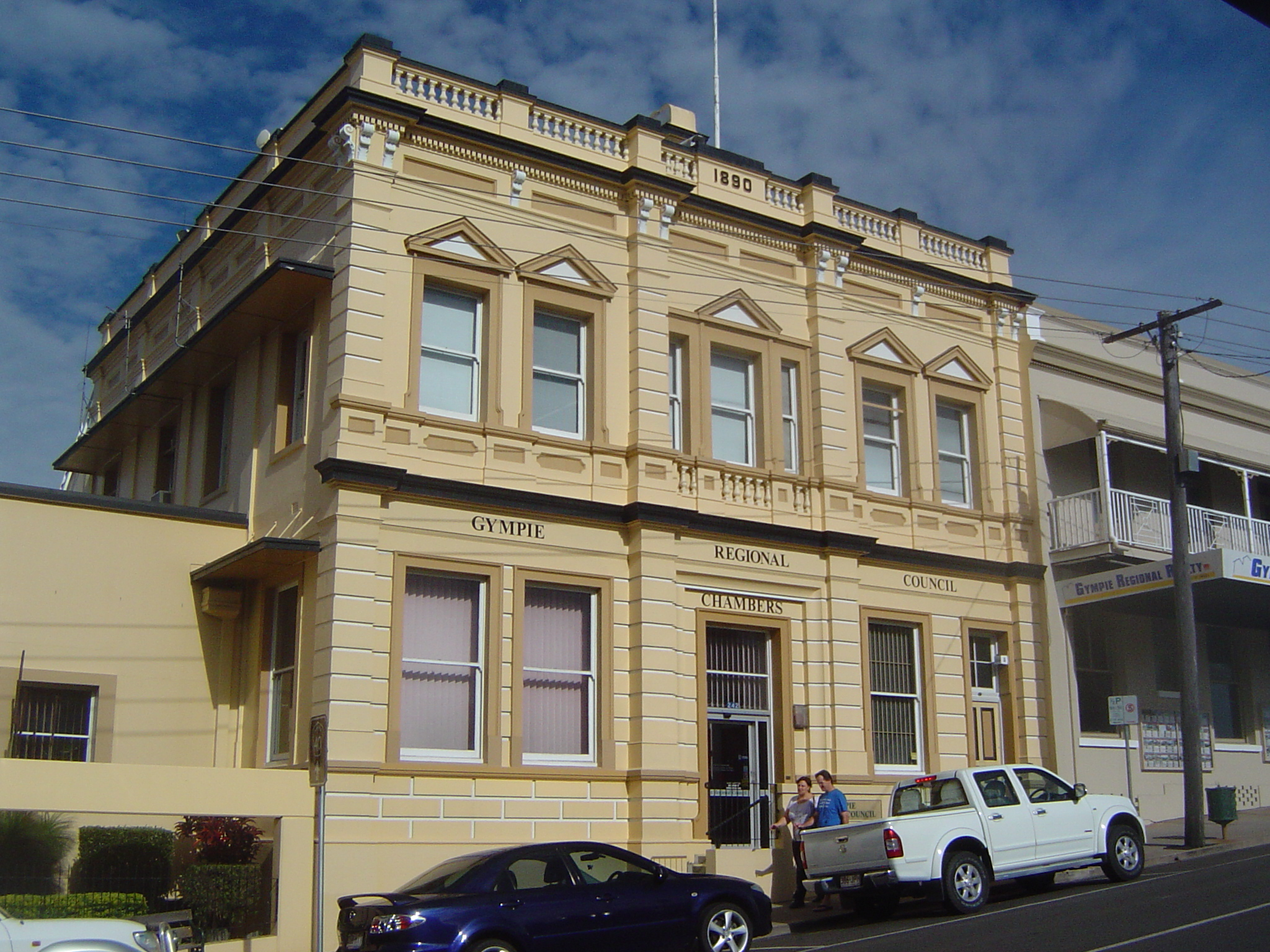
Gympie Regional Council Chambers, 2012

The Gympie area was originally settled for grazing purposes. The discovery of gold in 1867 led to a gold rush and the development of the Mary River valley for closer agricultural pursuits.

The Widgee Divisional Board was incorporated on 11 November 1879 under the Divisional Boards Act 1879. On 3 July 1886, its western part separately incorporated as the Division of Kilkivan. With the passage of the Local Authorities Act 1902, both Widgee and Kilkivan became shires on 31 March 1903. On 21 November 1940, the Widgee Shire Council moved into new premises formerly occupied by the Bank of New South Wales at 242 Mary Street, Gympie.

The Municipal Borough of Gympie was incorporated on 25 June 1880, holding its first elections on 25 August. A town hall was built in 1890. It became a town under the new Act on 31 March 1903, and on 7 January 1905 was proclaimed a city by the Governor of Queensland.

On 2 November 1993, the Shire of Widgee and the City of Gympie merged under the terms of the Local Government (Shire of Cooloola) Regulation 1993 to form the Shire of Cooloola. The first elections were held on 27 November 1993 and Adrian McClintock, the former Widgee chairman, was elected for a four-year term.

In July 2007, the Local Government Reform Commission released its report and recommended that Cooloola and Kilkivan amalgamate with part of the Shire of Tiaro. The first two councils opposed amalgamation, but in the event of amalgamation, thought the commission's proposal the best option. Tiaro wished to amalgamate with the Shire of Woocoo and opposed the plan.

On 15 March 2008, the three shires ceased to exist, and elections were held on the same day to elect eight councillors and a mayor to the Regional Council. Ron Dyne, the former mayor of Kilkivan, was elected as the region's first mayor. The former Cooloola Shire Council Chambers is now used as the Gympie Regional Council Chambers.

== Wards ==
The council remains undivided and its elected body consists of eight councillors and a mayor, elected for a four-year term.

== Current Councillors/Mayor ==
The mayor of the Gympie Regional Council is Glen Charles Hartwig. Mayor Glen Hartwig was elected in the Gympie Regional Council election on Saturday, 28 March 2020.

The councillors are:,

- Jess Milne – Division 1
- Nadine Jensen – Division 2
- Shane Warnes – Division 3
- Mick Curran – Division 4
- Allona Lahn – Division 5
- Warren McEwan – Division 6
- Warren Polley – Division 7
- Gordon Mausley – Division 8

== Mayors ==
- 2008–2014: Ron Dyne
- 2015–2020: Mick Curran
- 2020–present: Glen Hartwig

== Towns and localities ==
The Gympie Region includes the following settlements:

Gympie area:

- Gympie
- Araluen
- Chatsworth
- Glanmire
- Jones Hill
- Kybong
- Monkland
- Nahrunda
- Southside
- Tamaree
- The Dawn
- Two Mile
- Veteran
- Victory Heights
- Woondum

Widgee area:

- Amamoor
- Bollier
- Brooloo
- Calico Creek
- Canina
- Carters Ridge
- Cedar Pocket
- Cooloola
- Cooloola Cove
- Dagun
- Glastonbury
- Goomboorian
- Greens Creek
- Imbil
- Kandanga
- Kia Ora
- Lagoon Pocket
- Langshaw
- Melawondi
- Mothar Mountain
- Moy Pocket
- North Deep Creek
- Pie Creek
- Rainbow Beach
- Tandur
- The Palms
- Tin Can Bay^{1}
- Traveston
- Wallu
- Wilsons Pocket

Kilkivan area:

- Kilkivan
- Booubyjan
- Cinnabar
- Goomeri
- Johnstown
- Kinbombi
- Lower Wonga
- Manumbar
- Tansey
- Widgee
- Woolooga

South Tiaro - Division 3 area:

- Anderleigh
- Curra
- Glen Echo
- Gunalda
- Miva
- Neerdie
- Scotchy Pocket
- Theebine

^{1} - split with Fraser Coast Region

== Libraries ==
The Gympie Regional Council operate public libraries at Goomeri, Gympie, Imbil, Kilkivan, Rainbow Beach, and Tin Can Bay.

== Local heritage register ==
The Gympie Regional Council established and maintains the Gympie Local Heritage Register.

== Demographics ==
The populations given relate to the component entities prior to 2008. Estimates for the Tiaro component, not included in the figures below, are: 1,315 (1991); 1,695 (1996); 1,789 (2001) and 2,197 (2006).

Year	Population (Region total)	Population (Gympie)	Population (Widgee)	Population (Kilkivan)
1921	15,142	6,539	5,556	3,047
1933	20,722	7,749	8,686	4,287
1947	20,388	8,413	7,834	4,141
1954	22,026	9,964	8,139	3,923
1961	22,678	11,094	7,948	3,636
1966	22,114	11,279	7,490	3,345
1971	21,027	11,096	6,959	2,972
1976	22,171	11,280	8,240	2,651
1981	24,460	11,420	10,540	2,500
1986	27,118	11,430	12,970	2,718
1991	30,626	14,122	13,651	2,853
1996	34,901	15,099	16,637	3,165
2001	36,112	15,021	17,968	3,123
2006	39,478	16,454	19,616	3,408
2016	49,559			
2021	53,242			

== See also ==
- Great Sandy Biosphere Reserve
