= James Nash State High School =

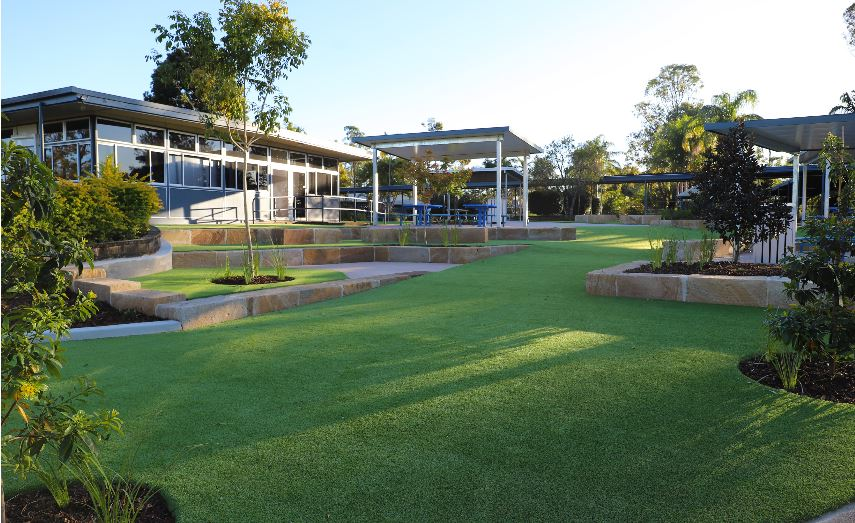
- James Nash State High School, 2025

Location
- 109 Myall Street; Gympie, Queensland; Australia; 26.175°S 152.657°E

Information
- Type: Public, secondary
- Motto: Truth More Precious than Gold
- Established: 1977
- Principal: Jackson Dodd
- Grades: 7–12
- Enrolment: 1220 (2017)
- Colours: Black, green and gold

James Nash State High School is a coeducational public secondary school in Gympie, Queensland, Australia. It was established in 1977 and named after gold discoverer James Nash. The school serves over 1,200 students and maintains a focus on academic and extracurricular programs, with its current principal being Jackson Dodd.

== History ==
The school opened on 24 January 1977, honouring James Nash who identified the Gympie Goldfield in 1867.

It received a Queensland Showcase Award for Excellence in Education in 2013.

== Structure and governance ==
James Nash State High School operates under the Queensland Department of Education. Leadership includes a principal, four deputy principals, and departmental heads overseeing curriculum and pastoral care. Staff numbers align with standard Queensland secondary school staffing ratios for its enrollment size.

== Curriculum and activities ==
=== Sports program ===
The school organizes students into four sporting houses named after historic local gold mines:

House	Colors
Caledonia	Black, purple
Columbia	Green
Glanmire	Blue
Phoenix	Red

These houses compete in annual inter-school athletics events and swimming carnivals.

=== Extracurricular offerings ===
Programs include:

- Agriculture: Working farm with cattle and crop facilities
- Performing arts: Annual musical productions
- STEM initiatives: Robotics club and regional science competitions

== Campus ==
Located at 109 Myall Street, the 14-hectare campus features:

- Specialist facilities for vocational education
- Sports ovals and multipurpose courts
- Agricultural plots and greenhouse complex

== Recognition ==
- 2013 Queensland Showcase Award for Excellence in Education
- Regional winners in STEM competitions (2018–2020)

== History ==
James Nash State High School officially opened on 24 January 1977 and was named in honour of James Nash (5 September 1834 – 5 October 1913), who discovered the Gympie Goldfield on 16 October 1867.

In 2013, James Nash State High School received a Queensland Showcase Award for Excellence in Education.

== Sporting houses ==
James Nash State High School includes the following four sporting houses, all of which are named in reference to gold mines worked on the Gympie Goldfield, with their respective colours:

House name	Colour(s)
Caledonia	Black, purple
Columbia	Green
Glanmire	Blue
Phoenix	Red

== Extracurricular activities ==
=== Clubs and societies ===
- Academy of Creative Arts (ACA)
- Art activities
- Chess Club
- Crochet Group
- Makerspace
- Structured Learning Gardening Club
- Study Group
- Volleyball
- Year 7 Gardening Club

=== Sports ===
Inter-school sports competitions are available for AFL, Hockey, Netball, Rugby League, Rugby Union and Soccer.

Students have an ability to make representative regional teams in the following sports:

- AFL
- Basketball
- Cricket
- Golf
- Hockey
- Netball
- Rugby League
- Rugby Union
- Soccer
- Squash
- Softball
- Tennis
- Touch Football
- Volleyball

Annual Sports Carnivals are held for Swimming, Cross Country and Athletics. These carnivals are the base for James Nash State High School's four representative houses to vie for the ‘James Nash House Cup’.

== Notable alumni ==
- Iszac Fa'asuamaleaui, rugby league player
- Tino Fa'asuamaleaui, rugby league player
