= Boreen Point, Queensland =

Boreen Point
- Suburb
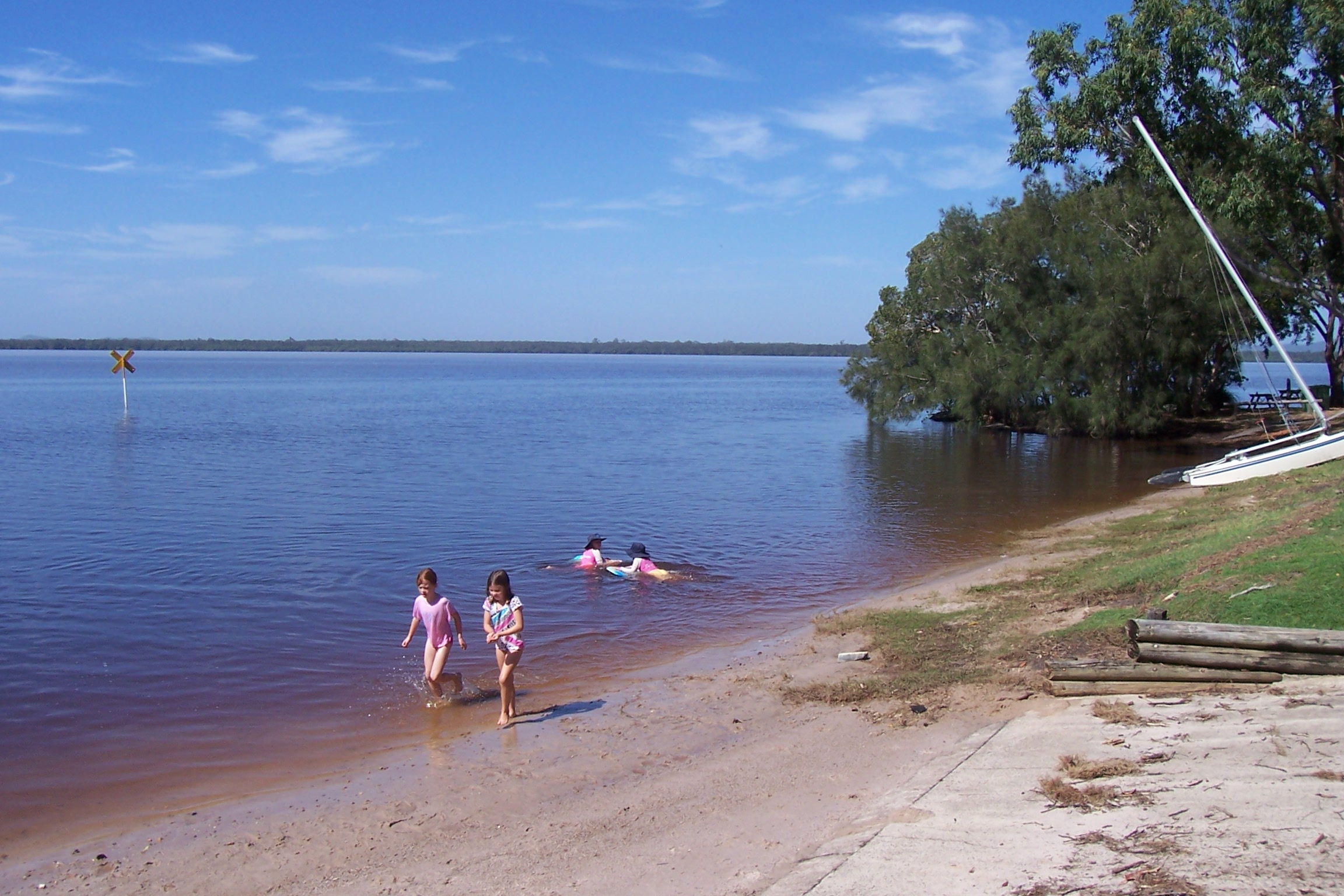
- Main Beach, Boreen Point (Note dark Tannin discolouration of the water)

- Interactive map of Boreen Point
- Coordinates: 26.2817°S 152.9847°E
- Country: Australia
- State: Queensland
- LGA: Shire of Noosa
- Location: 18.2 km (11.3 mi) E of Kin Kin; 19.2 km (11.9 mi) N of Tewantin; 28.3 km (17.6 mi) NW of Cooroy; 165 km (103 mi) N of Brisbane

Government
  - State electorate: Noosa
  - Federal division: Wide Bay>

Area
  - Total: 5.3 km^{2} (2.0 sq mi)

Population
  - Total: 359 (2021 census)
  - Density: 67.7/km^{2} (175.4/sq mi)
- Time zone: UTC+10:00 (AEST)
- Postcode: 4565
Suburbs around Boreen Point
Cootharaba	Como	Noosa North Shore
Cootharaba	Boreen Point	Noosa North Shore
Cootharaba	Cootharaba	Noosa North Shore

Boreen Point is a rural locality in the Shire of Noosa, Queensland, Australia. The town of Boreen is located within the locality beside the lake (26.2844°S 152.9933°E), but the town name is rarely used; Boreen Point being the name in common usage.

In the 2021 census, Boreen Point had a population of 359 people.

== Geography ==
Stingray in shallows at Boreen Point

Boreen Point is north of Tewantin on the Sunshine Coast.

One of Boreen Point's major attractions is Lake Cootharaba, a very large, shallow lake that is recognised nationally for its fantastic weather for sailing and windsurfing. The lake leads from the Noosa River and also up to national parks.

== History ==
The name comes from an Aboriginal word from the tribes around Moreton Bay which refers to the pathway that led between two bora rings.

In 1987, the historic inn Apollonian Hotel (built 1860s) was relocated from Gympie, Queensland and rebuilt in Boreen Point. It was named after the Greek God Apollo.

Although currently and historically within the local government area of Shire of Noosa, between 2008 and 2013, Boreen Point (and the rest of the Shire of Noosa) was within Sunshine Coast Region following a controversial amalgamation of local government areas that was subsequently reversed following a vote by local people to deamalgamate the Shire of Noosa.

== Demographics ==
In the 2011 census, Boreen Point had a population of 264 people.

In the 2016 census, Boreen Point had a population of 328 people.

In the 2021 census, Boreen Point had a population of 359 people.

== Education ==
There are no schools in Boreen Point. The nearest government primary schools are Kin Kin State School in Kin Kin to the west and Tewantin State School in Tewantin to the south. The nearest government secondary school is Noosa District State High School which has its junior campus in Pomona and its senior campus in Cooroy, both to the south-west.

== Amenities ==
The Shire of Noosa operates a mobile library service on a weekly schedule in Orchard Avenue.

There is a boat ramp on Orchard Avenue into Lake Cootharaba and the Noosa River (26.2828°S 152.9963°E). It is managed by the Noosa Shire Council.

=== Parks ===
There are a number of parks in the area:

- Boreen Point Foreshore Park (26.2867°S 152.9953°E)
- Borg Park (26.2851°S 152.9965°E)
- Coates Park (26.2845°S 152.9921°E)
- Rainforest Court Bushland Reserve (26.2833°S 152.9908°E)
- Urunga Parade Foreshore (26.2838°S 152.9977°E)

== Facilities ==
Facilities in the locality include:

- Boreen Point Rural Fire Station (26.2865°S 152.9949°E)
- Boreen Point SES Facility (26.2865°S 152.9950°E)
