= Mill Point Settlement Site =

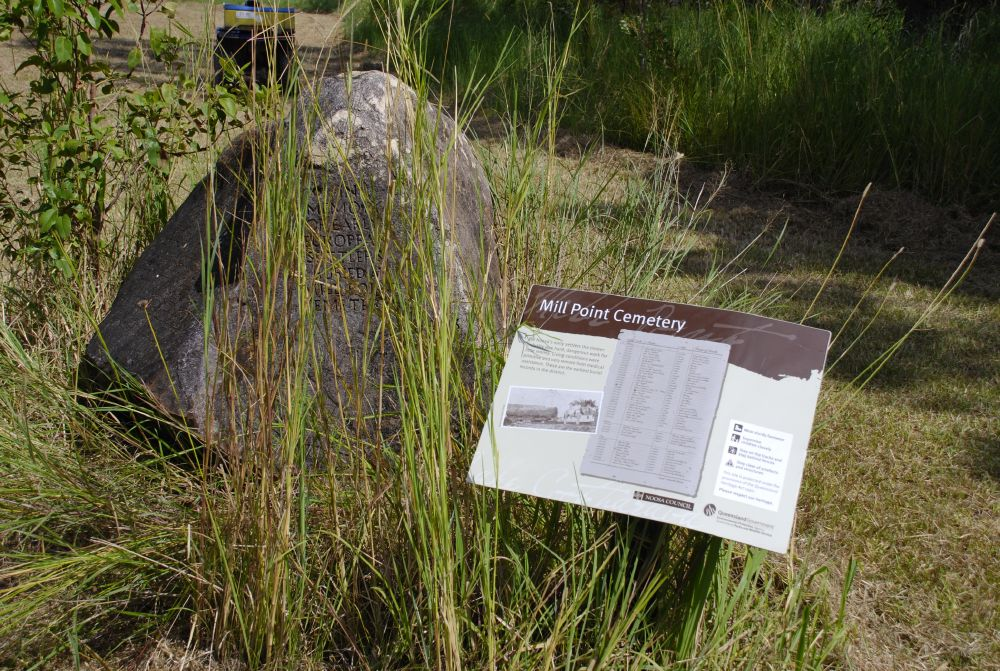
- Information board at Mill Point Cemetery, 2008

- Location within Queensland Location within Australia
- 26.2478°S 153.0001°E
- Location: Elanda Point at Lake Cootharaba in Como, Shire of Noosa, Queensland, Australia

History
- Design period: 1840s–1860s (mid-19th century)
- Built: c. 1869–1940s

Queensland Heritage Register
- Official name: Mill Point Settlement Site
- Type: state heritage (archaeological)
- Designated: 6 April 2005
- Reference no.: 601280
- Significant period: 1869–1892, 1920s, 1940s (fabric); 1869–1892 (historical)
- Significant components: embankment – tramway, mill – wind, chimney/chimney stack, well, trees/plantings, objects (movable) – forestry/timber industry, signage – interpretative, cemetery, steps/stairway, machinery/plant/equipment – forestry/timber industry, yards – livestock, memorial – rock/stone/boulder

Mill Point Settlement Site is a heritage-listed former settlement at Elanda Point at Lake Cootharaba in Como, Shire of Noosa, Queensland, Australia. It was built from c. 1869 to the 1940s. It was added to the Queensland Heritage Register on 6 April 2005.

== History ==
The Mill Point Settlement Site on Lake Cootharaba contains remnants of a private "company" township based around a sawmill and sustained by timber extraction from local forests which was in operation from the late 1860s until the early 1890s.

Exploration of the timber resources in the Cooloola area commenced in the early 1860s. William Pettigrew visited the area in 1863, exploring the Noosa River and its lakes. Although Pettigrew subsequently concentrated his timber operations in northern Cooloola, he recorded quantities of hardwoods and softwoods including cedar, bunya pine, kauri pine, Hoop pine, Cypress pine, beech, ash, tulip and yellow-wood in various locations. Cedar-getters appear to have been working in the Noosa River area by the mid-1860s. The development of the timber industry in southern Cooloola has been attributed, at least in part, to the capital injected into the area as a result of the exploitation of the gold resource at Gympie.

An application to select Portion 1 in the parish of Noosa, the land on which the Mill Point Settlement was established, was lodged by Charles Samuel Russell in March 1869. Portion 1 was later known as Cootharaba Station and fronted Lake Cootharaba. Russell, having previously visited the Noosa area and noted the "attractiveness" of land at Lake Cootharaba, formed a partnership with four men involved in mining ventures in Gympie: James McGhie, Abraham Fleetwood Luya, Frederick George Goodchap and John Woodburn. Although Russell's name is recorded as the applicant, subsequent references are made to "McGhie, Luya and Co." as the company, which established the Cootharaba Sawmills at Mill Point.

Following his arrival in Queensland in 1864, Luya had worked on various railways until 1869 when he moved to the Gympie goldfield. He established Cootharaba Sawmills, commencing a 30-year association with the sawmilling industry. Luya established McGhie, Luya and Co., merchants and sawmillers, with an office in South Brisbane. From 1888 to 1899, Luya was also the managing director of the Queensland Milling Company. Luya's involvement in Queensland and Brisbane politics included periods as MLA for South Brisbane (1888–93 and in 1899), and as Mayor of South Brisbane (1896–98). Luya died in Brisbane in July 1899. An article in the Brisbane Courier following Luya's death described him as "one of the leading business men of the city for many years".

By the end of 1869, McGhie, Luya and Co. had moved onto Portion 1. Improvements including houses and a sawmill were erected in 1870. A Mill Manager was advertised for in April 1872. Although Russell and his wife lived at Elanda Point, Russell's interest was transferred to the other partners in mid-1871.

The "second class pastoral land" of Cootharaba Station was used as a cattle property to supply meat for the sawmill company's employees and as a source of bullocks and horses to haul the company's wagons and drays.

The Mill Point Settlement was built in a swampy area on the edge of Lake Cootharaba. The swamp was progressively filled in with sawdust to create and extend the timber yards. Initially timber was taken from Portion 1 and logs were rafted down Kin Kin Creek to the lake and held in a yard by a double line of piles forming a breakwater. During later sawmill operations, timber was taken from as far away as Mount Coondoo and hauled to a tram terminus. By the early 1870s loads of timber were sent along Cootharaba Road to Gympie.

Transporting the timber was initially the most problematic aspect of the operation at Mill Point. Bullock teams became bogged in the saturated, sandy soils and Cootharaba Road had swampy sections, steep pinches and seven miles of scrub along Kin Kin and Tinana Creeks. The difficulties of Cootharaba Road were resolved with the establishment of an outlet by sea via a depot at Tewantin, which was managed by Goodchap. Flat-bottomed paddle-wheel boats known as droghers, (the "Black Swan", "Countess of Belmore" and "Elanda"), towed punts of sawn timber through Lakes Cootharaba and Cooroibah to Tewantin, where the timber was loaded onto the firm's steamer, the "S.S. Culgoa" and taken to Brisbane three times a fortnight with loads of up to 35,000 super feet of timber. The S.S. Culgoa was built in Adelaide in 1865 and used on the Darling and Murrumbidgee Rivers before acquisition by McGhie, Luya and Co. The Company established "Noosa Sawmill" at South Brisbane in the early 1880s and the S.S. Culgoa carried passengers, general cargo and sawn timber on each trip between Tewantin and Brisbane until completion of the Brisbane-Gympie railway link in 1891.

To overcome the problems with swampy, sticky, low-lying and poorly drained ground conditions at Mill Point, during the mid-1870s the Company constructed a tramway system of 3-foot (0.91 m) gauge wooden rails, 4 by 2 inches (102 by 51 mm) in cross-section, across the property. The wooden rails were wedged into slots on sleepers of penda and ironbark. The main tramway line ran for about a quarter of a mile in an easterly direction to the sawmill and settlement on Lake Cootharaba. To raise the tramway above the surrounding swampy country, felled melaleuca were laid with stout girders on top, sleepers were then laid at three feet intervals across the girders to secure the rails, gaps between were slabbed and filled with ballast consisting of sand and gravel from the Lake to provide traction for the bullock and horse teams. The line appears to have run through flat country except for one ridgeline, where a cutting reached the valley of Kin Kin. The line had relatively few curves and a gentle gradient from the hinterland to sea level at the lake. The terminus appears to have been bound by Eulama and Kin Kin Creeks, approximately 4 miles (6.4 km) west of Mill Point.

A reporter for the Brisbane Courier in the mid-1870s noted that sections of the rail were "smooth as glass" and one side appeared to be wearing out faster than the other. He was told that the worn side was made from ironbark wood and needed replacing once every six months, while the penda lasted two years and even then generally did not need replacing. By 1877, only penda was being used for rails, and in 1878 the wooden rails were replaced with 16 pounds (7.3 kg) steel, negating the need for constant repair.

In August 1878, the Brisbane Courier reported that the "company is preparing to lay down four miles of railway with 16 pound rails which would carry five ton wagons so logs could be hauled by three or four horses or by a small traction engine". Logs were drawn to the sawmill along the tramway on wagons pulled by draughthorse teams; the traction engine option appears never to have been used at Mill Point. The use of the tramway was certainly much faster than the original bullock dragged method where logs were dragged from where they were cut to the sawmill for processing. It has been suggested that the Company was persuaded to establish the expensive tramway, at just under £300 per mile, to overcome the difficulties of inducing teams to work at Mill Point. However, at its peak a total of nine bullock and horse teams were employed at Mill Point. In December 1873, McGhie advertised for six bullock teams to draw cedar logs guaranteeing two years work. In late 1874, 100 men were reported as employed there and in 1878, McGhie, Luya & Co. advertised for teams, emphasising the constant work. The establishment of the tramway also provided certainty for McGhie, Lyua & Co. During periods of wet weather, bullock teams were generally unable to work, but the tramway teams could operate continually. Loading the felled timber onto the tramway wagons was done by using a winch on a trolley that was anchored to the tramway.

Five men were killed at the sawmill as the result of a boiler explosion on 29 July 1873. One man was killed instantly with another four men subsequently dying of injuries received as a result of standing near the boiler. Four of the five men died at Mill Point and were buried in the cemetery. The fifth, Patrick Molloy, died after great suffering on 10 September in Gympie Hospital and was buried in the Gympie cemetery (his hearse overturning en route to the cemetery). The explosion was attributed to a weakness in the boiler rather than as a result of careless operation. The explosion was one of a number that occurred in Queensland that year and an inquest into safety ensued. Following the inquest, regulations covering the design of valves on steam boilers were tightened, and boiler operators needed a certificate to operate.

During the early period of its establishment the settlement was known as "Kin Kin Sawmills" however it was subsequently known as "Cootharaba Sawmill" or "Cootharaba Village Settlement". It has been known locally as both "Mill Point" and "Elanda Point" since the early 20th century. In 1871, the population of the settlement was 22 people. In May 1873, in preparation for a visit by Governor Normanby, an account of a visit by a journalist records "Leaving the works and passing to the rear we found a regular little township of workmen's houses and others directly connected with the establishment, a good store, well- equipped, conducted by the owners, a butcher's shop, and there seemed nothing wanting to complete the comfort of all connected with the establishment".

The Cootharaba School was established at the settlement and opened in August 1874 with an enrolment of 16 students. For the period of its operation the sawmill and associated settlement was a Company enterprise, and the only external employee was the school teacher. The sawmill proprietors provided a school building, including a library, reading room and grounds. The school also served as a community hall. In a report to Parliament in 1875, the school was described as a comfortable building with a verandah near the shores of Lake Cootharaba, better equipped than most schools in the colony.

A hotel operated from 1876 until 1878, when the building was destroyed by fire. Community life included picnics, excursions and sports days. For example, New Year's Day in 1877 was celebrated with a cricket match, sawmill hands versus timber-getters and bullock-drivers.

A cemetery was established at the Cootharaba Settlement and 43 burials are recorded between 1873 and 1891, comprising 9 men, 4 women and 30 children. The first burials included four of the five men who were injured in the boiler explosion of 29 July 1873. Children buried in the cemetery died of causes such as lung problems, wasting, thrush, convulsions and drowning. The cemetery was never officially gazetted, being a private cemetery on privately owned land. Vera Grady (née Crang) who lived on a later dairy farm in the area during the early 1900s remembered 11 grave markers at the cemetery during the 1920s. Several of the grave markers have since been collected by relatives and concerned locals and are held in the local Elanda Point Queensland Parks and Wildlife Service office. With their removal from original positions and no official record of burial locations, there is no reliable way to identify who was buried where in the cemetery. A single headstone is located in the Museum at Gympie.

During the 1880s, at the height of the sawmill's operations, it is estimated that there were between 100 and 150 employees and their families living at the sawmill and settlement.

From the mid-1880s, a series of events led to the eventual decline and closure of the sawmill complex in the early 1890s. The Queensland Government's introduction of royalties in 1884, intended to control wasteful cutting and competition from imported timbers, reduced the output of local sawmills and kept the price of timber down. These timber regulations were part of the provisions of the 1884 Crown Lands Act, forestry then being under the control of the Department of Public Lands. This Act established the system of perpetual leasehold and was the product of the philosophy of the new liberal government of Griffith that the state should get a return from the private use of public resources. The new Minister for Lands, Dutton, saw the royalty as the timber equivalent of a pastoral rent. Opposition was intense, especially since the royalty was seen to give an unfair advantage to imports. By the early 1890s the softwood resources in the vicinity of the sawmill were nearing exhaustion, having been exploited for 20 years. Completion of the Brisbane-Gympie railway link in July 1891 ended the need for a ship and coach service between Brisbane and Gympie via Tewantin. The S.S. Culgoa was wrecked on the Noosa River bar in 1891 and the sawmill finally closed in 1892. The sawmill itself was eventually demolished and materials were reused or left to fall down during the subsequent use as farm land.

In 1891, Luya attempted to establish a "village settlement" on Portion 1, offering leases of 40 acres (16 ha) blocks to prospective farmers. Eleven families moved onto the blocks in March that year and by November over half had left the area as the land proved unfit for cultivation, being either too wet or too sandy. Dairy farmers moved into the area in the early 20th century, but dairy farming was not successful either. This was partly due to the swampy country and the deficiencies of trace elements in the soil. A chimney remains as evidence of where the main dairy farmhouse stood near the former settlement of Mill Point. This chimney appears to date from the time of the sawmill and was adapted and reused during the farming period at the site.

Title records indicate that the property and its subsequent subdivisions changed ownership a number of times until it was transferred to the Queensland Government in 1983. The Mill Point area was gazetted as part of Cooloola National Park in 1985 (later becoming part of the Great Sandy National Park).

A commemorative plaque was laid at the site in 1988 near the junction of a walking track from the Elanda Point camping ground to the south and tramway formation to the west.

Australian poet Judith Wright visited the Mill Point cemetery and wrote a poem, first published in 1956, about life as she imagined it at the settlement during the late 1800s. The poem entitled Graves at Mill Point was written about the life of a man from the settlement known as Alfred Watt. In fact, Alfred was one of the first infants to be buried at the cemetery in 1874 at the age of four months and 20 days.

The local branch of the National Trust of Queensland erected a stone on 24 April 1993 bearing the inscription, In memory of the European settlers buried at Mill Point Cemetery, and engraved with the names of persons buried at the cemetery.

On 22 June 2004, six interpretive signs, designed by QPWS Elanda Point and Noosa Shire Council, were installed at key locations around the site describing some of its rich history.

== Description ==
=== Tramway ===
The main tramway extends from the settlement area in a curving arc westward. The heritage register boundary extends 5 metres (16 ft) either side of the middle of the tramway mound. Sections of the original rail remain in situ near the settlement site. Much of the remaining tramway is used as vehicle access. The tramway extends off the National Park into neighbouring properties, but its full extent has yet to be accurately mapped.

=== Cemetery ===
The Mill Point cemetery is located 2 kilometres (1.2 mi) west of the settlement area and the boundary forms a square extending from the 1993 memorial stone and interpretive signage in the south a further 200 metres (660 ft) north and is 80 metres (260 ft) wide. The eastern boundary is defined by dense revegetation undertaken in mid-late 1990s by QPWS, which is encroaching into the cemetery area and make identification of the full extent of the cemetery difficult. A ploughed field that has also been revegetated by QPWS, although more recently, defines the eastern boundary. Originally there were grave markers at the cemetery, however, these markers have gradually been removed over the years. The base of one headstone remains at the cemetery and has "Petrie, Brisbane" engraved on it (the Petrie family of Brisbane carried out a business of monumental masonry). Some graves at the cemetery are recognisable by slight depressions in the ground. 15 depressions were mapped in 2004 and are believed to be the probable location of graves. They align in at least 2 rows and are generally orientated east-west as was typical of burial styles in the late 19th century.

=== Settlement area/Sawmill proper ===
The settlement area boundary extends from the dairy farmhouse (described separately below) through to the shores of Lake Cootharaba and 150 metres (490 ft) into Lake Cootharaba itself. The area consists of a section of mounded tramway raised above the melaleuca swamp, which extends for approximately 150 metres (490 ft) to the shore of Lake Cootharaba. Evidence that the area was once a thriving town is provided by the rich archaeological remains. Most identifiable of these remains are the numerous handmade bricks concentrated under a large fig tree which is less than 80 years old. The bricks were made by many different people (this includes people from the company as well as outsiders) as evidenced in the numerous "frogs" (indentations in bricks indicating their manufacturer). A large metal boiler dating to the time of the mill stands near the fig tree. Although of the correct period, it is unclear if this boiler comes from the site and is not in situ. The remains of a second boiler are located within Lake Cootharaba and could be related to the 1873 boiler explosion. The remains of the tramway abutment are also located near the fig tree. All that remains above ground level are a number of metal rods and two thick pieces of timber. Two metal pipes extend from beneath the fig tree into Lake Cootharaba and are thought to be related to transporting water from the Lake to the boilers. Between the farmhouse and the shores of Lake Cootharaba are the remains of 20th century yards with hundreds of wooden fence and rail posts. Cecil Potts (a former owner) erected cattle yards in the mid-1940s. Some of the fence posts still have the remains of a three-pronged, handmade barbed wire threaded through the rail holes. Recorded artefacts include numerous pieces of metal (including rose-headed nails, files and saddle buckles), ceramics (including plates, mugs and children's toys), glass (including broken pieces of bottle), and bricks (including different frogs such as "J. Petrie", "CLYDE" and 'PATON').

=== Lake Cootharaba ===
The Lake Cootharaba boundary extends from the modern shoreline out into the lake 150 metres (490 ft). On the surface and embedded in the lakebed are archaeological remains including bricks, sawn timber, glass, ceramics and metal. The location of pylons from the jetties and wharves associated with the operation of the mill remain in place as large, round stumps. A large metal tram wheel is also located within the waters of the lake.

=== Dairy farmhouse ===
The dairy farmhouse is located 350 metres (1,150 ft) west of the settlement area. A large, rendered brick chimney is all that remains of the farmhouse, a feature that probably survives from sawmill times. The brick chimney is surrounded by a fence that was erected by QPWS to limit access to the chimney by visitors to the Park and for public health and safety. Three concrete steps are associated with the brick chimney that originally led into the house, but now go nowhere. The concrete is very coarse and of a poor quality. There is a garden associated with the farmhouse that contains a number of historic plantings including crepe myrtles, guavas and bougainvillea. Two mango trees were planted in 1924 by Vera Grady (née Crang), whose family owned and worked the property as a dairy. Near the mango trees is the original brick-lined well dating to the sawmill period. John Crang built a wooden cover for the well that was hinged in the middle in the 1920s, this has since been replaced with a metal ring plate and a wooden platform completely enclosing the well. A windmill, also built by John Crang is associated with the well. The four large timber posts around the windmill were erected by Cecil Potts. A plaque erected in 1993 is located at the junction of a walking track from the Elanda Point camping area to the south and tramway formation to the west.

== Heritage listing ==
The Mill Point Settlement Site was listed on the Queensland Heritage Register on 6 April 2005 having satisfied the following criteria.

The place is important in demonstrating the evolution or pattern of Queensland's history.

The Mill Point Settlement Site is important in demonstrating part of the pattern of Queensland's history, being associated with the development of the timber industry in the late 19th century. As remnant evidence of a substantial timber extraction and timber processing enterprise and timber settlement in the Cooloola area from 1869 to 1892, it is important in illustrating the pattern of settlement in the Noosa hinterland. It was one of the first and most successful timber mills in the Cooloola area and played an important role in legislative reform in the boiler industry in terms of health and safety following the boiler explosion of 1873.

The place has potential to yield information that will contribute to an understanding of Queensland's history.

The survival of extensive remnant material associated with the tramway, the cemetery, dairy area, jetties and wharves at Mill Point, including surface and sub-surface archaeological deposits to a depth of at least 2 metres (6 ft 7 in) below ground level, has the potential to reveal further information about 19th and 20th century life and burial practices at a company timber town in rural Queensland, and about timber extraction and processing.

The place has a strong or special association with a particular community or cultural group for social, cultural or spiritual reasons.

The Mill Point Settlement Site has social significance to the local Boreen Point/Noosa community.

The place has a special association with the life or work of a particular person, group or organisation of importance in Queensland's history.

The Mill Point Settlement Site has a particular association with the work of McGhie and Luya who were influential in the development of rural southeast Queensland through the development of company towns and involvement in the gold rushes.

== See also ==
- List of tramways in Queensland
