= ETG =

ETG or EtG may refer to:

== Businesses and organisations ==
- Entrada Travel Group
- EtherCAT Technology Group
- Eural Trans Gas, a defunct Hungarian energy company
- Evian Thonon Gaillard F.C., a defunct French football club

== Medicine ==
- Electrotrichogenesis
- Ethyl glucuronide, a metabolite of ethanol

== Other uses ==
- Enter the Gungeon
- Elément à Turbine à Gaz, a French turbotrain
- Early-type galaxy, essentially a synonym for Elliptical galaxy (sometimes also including lenticular galaxies)
- Ella T. Grasso, 83rd Governor of Connecticut
