= Cootharaba =

Cootharaba may refer to:

- Lake Cootharaba
- Cootharaba, Queensland
