= Noosa North Shore, Queensland =

Noosa North Shore
- Suburb
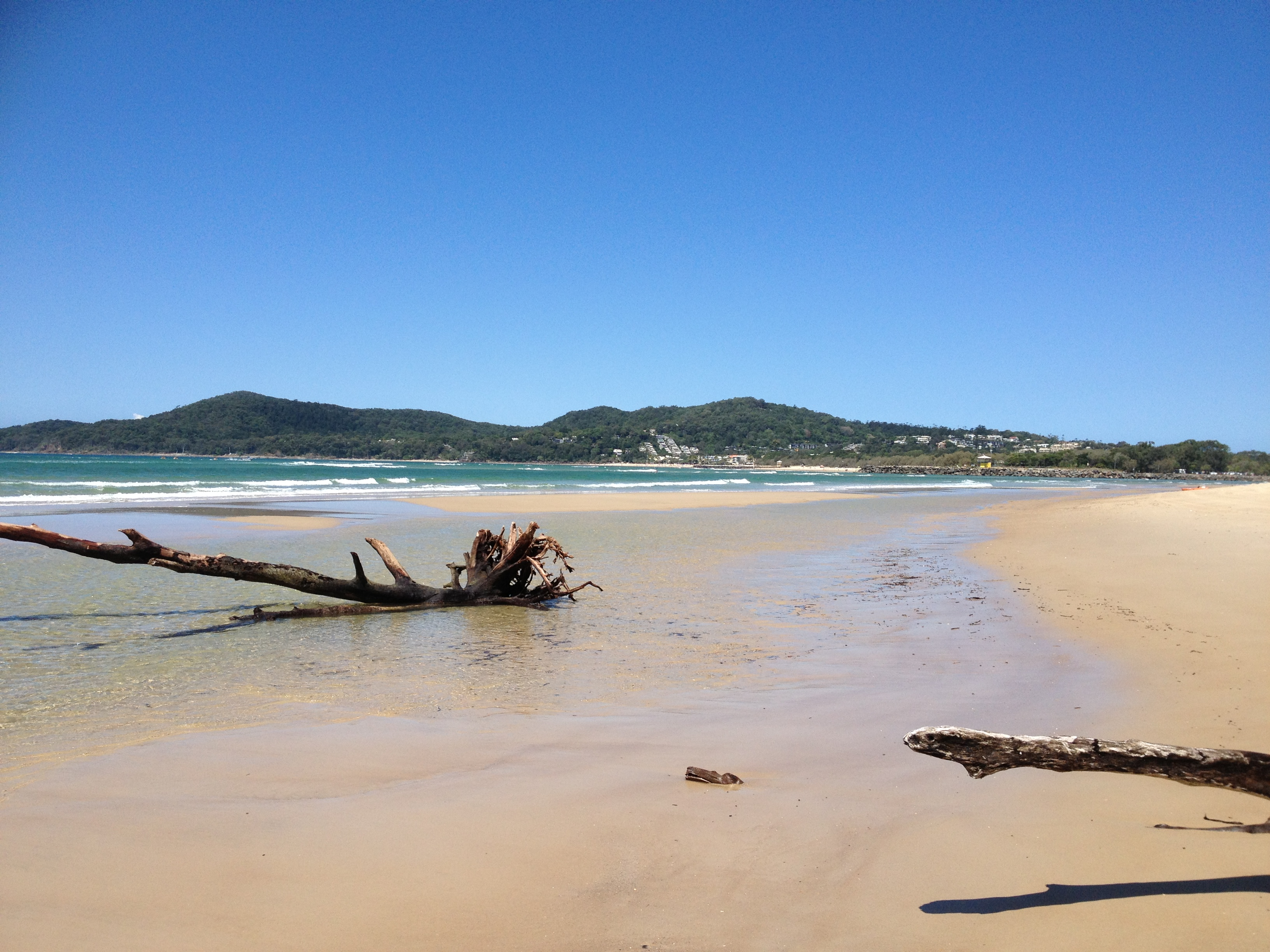
- Beach at North Shore, Queensland looking south towards Noosa Heads

- Interactive map of Noosa North Shore
- Coordinates: 26.2733°S 153.0511°E
- Country: Australia
- State: Queensland
- City: Noosa
- LGA: Shire of Noosa
- Location: 6.7 km (4.2 mi) SW of Tewantin (via ferry); 14.7 km (9.1 mi) SE of Sunshine Beach (via ferry); 149 km (93 mi) N of Brisbane (via ferry)

Government
  - State electorate: Noosa
  - Federal division: Wide Bay

Area
  - Total: 140.1 km^{2} (54.1 sq mi)

Population
  - Total: 253 (2021 census)
  - Density: 1.806/km^{2} (4.677/sq mi)
- Time zone: UTC+10:00 (AEST)
- Postcode: 4565
Suburbs around Noosa North Shore
Como	Cooloola	Coral Sea
Boreen Point; Cootharaba; Ringtail Creek	Noosa North Shore	Coral Sea
Cooroibah; Tewantin	Noosaville	Noosa Heads

Noosa North Shore is a coastal rural locality in the Shire of Noosa, Queensland, Australia. In the 2021 census, Noosa North Shore had a population of 253 people.

== Geography ==
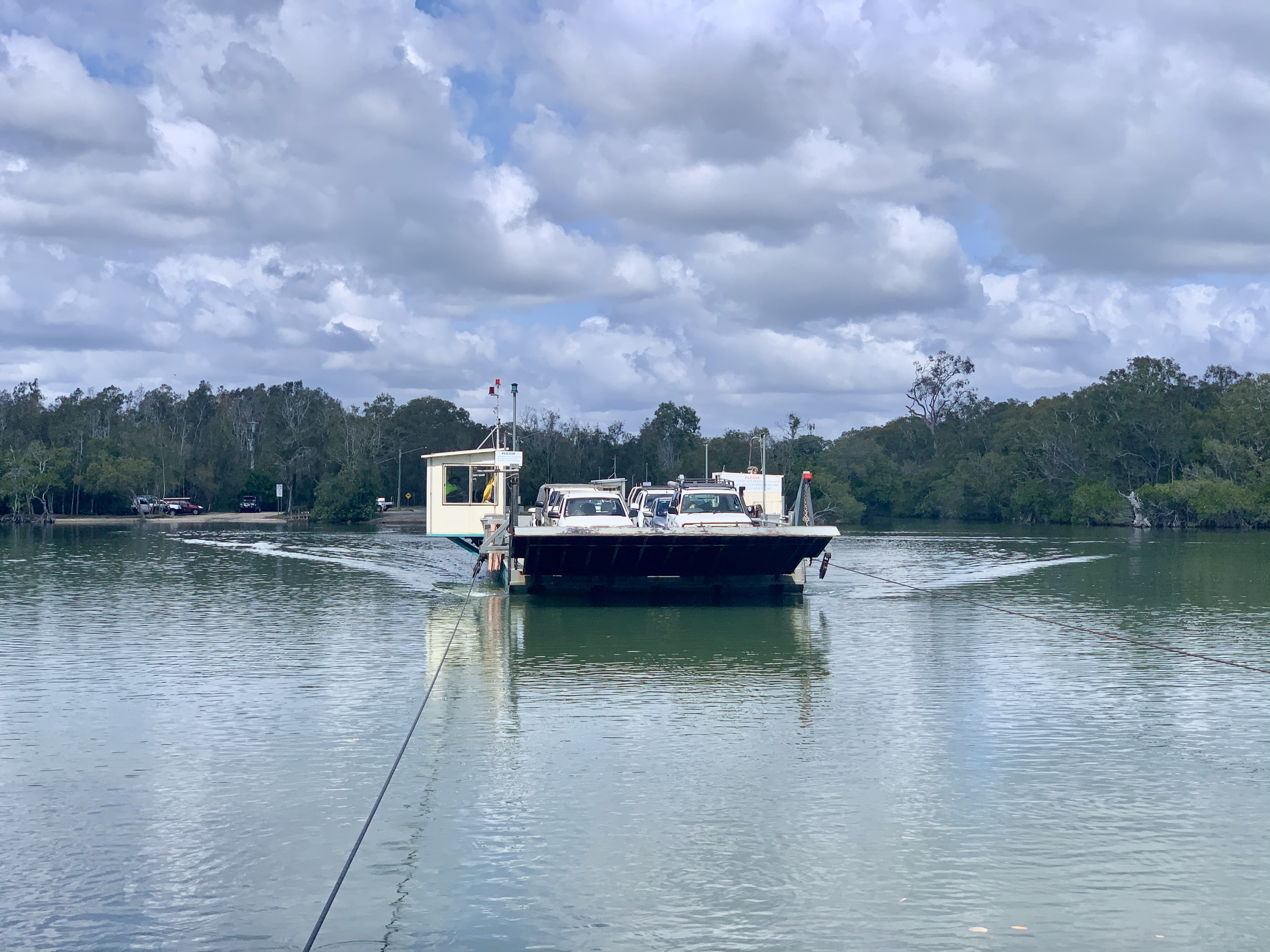
Ferry in the middle of the Noosa River, Noosa North Shore Ferries, 2019

The locality is bounded to the east by the Coral Sea and to the south and west by the Noosa River and Lake Cootharaba (a lake on the Noosa River). The locality's name refers to its position on the northern bank of the river.

The locality contains many sections of the Great Sandy National Park and the small town of Teewah.

Access to the locality is provided by the cable ferry, Noosa River Ferry, which crosses the Noosa River at Tewantin. In order to maintain Noosa North Shore as a wilderness area, there are no plans to provide road or bridge access and there are restrictions on development.

== History ==
Although historically and currently within the Shire of Noosa, between 2008 and 2013 Noosa North Shore was within Sunshine Coast Region following an unpopular amalgamation of the shire into a larger local government area, followed by a subsequent disamalgamation after continual local agitation confirmed by a ballot.

== Demographics ==
In the 2006 census, Noosa North Shore had a population of 121 people.

In the 2016 census, Noosa North Shore had a population of 179 people.

In the 2021 census, Noosa North Shore had a population of 253 people.

== Education ==
There are no schools in Noosa North Shore. The nearest government primary schools are Tewantin State School in neighbouring Tewantin to the south-west and Kin Kin State School in Kin Kin to the west. The nearest government secondary schools are Sunshine Beach State High School in Sunshine Beach to the south-east and Noosa District State High School, which has its junior campus in Pomona to the west and its senior campus in Cooroy to the south-west.

== Attractions ==
The locality is the southern end point of the Cooloola Great Walk.
