= Cooloola Great Walk =

Bushwalking route in Queensland, Australia

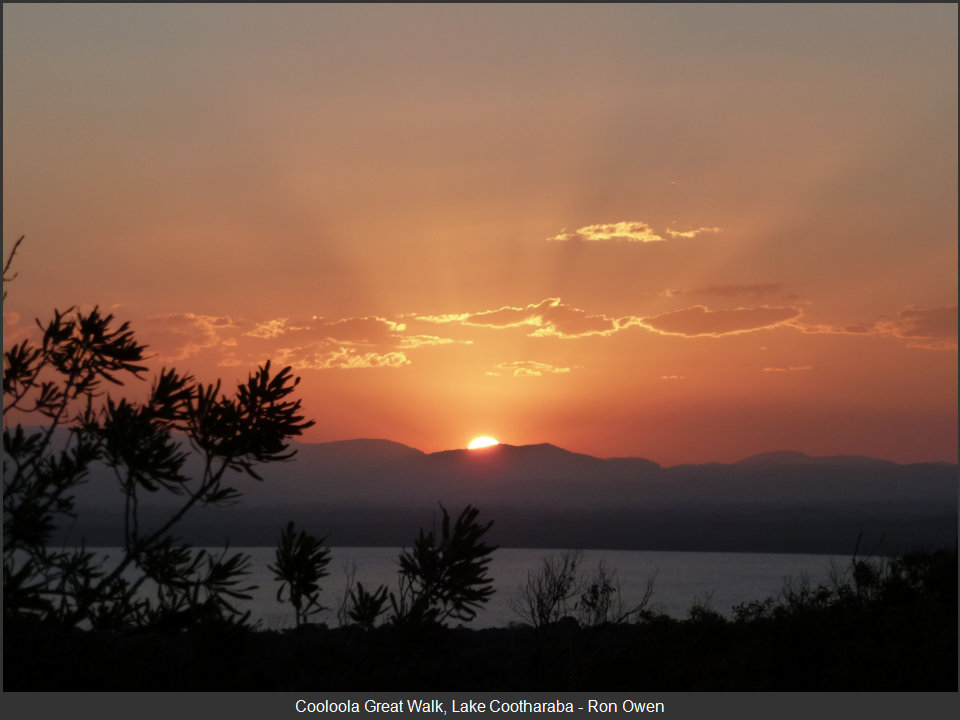
Lake Cootharaba on the Cooloola Great Walk

The Cooloola Great Walk is a 102 kilometres (63 mi) coastal bushwalking route in the Great Sandy National Park of South East Queensland, Australia. Opened in 2010, it runs from Noosa North Shore through Cooloola to Rainbow Beach, and is planned as a five-day trek. The hiking trail was officially opened by Climate Change and Sustainability Minister Kate Jones in March 2010.

== Path ==
The walk passes through rainforest, tall eucalypt forest, dry coastal woodland and heath plains. It is considered an easy walk with no long or steep climbs. The Cooloola Great Walk was extended so walkers could pass by the Double Island Point Lighthouse. Walkers also pass Teewah Beach and the Noosa River, and cross the Cooloola Sandpatch.

== Facilities ==
Four campsites with rain water supplies and toilets are available. Permits are required for camping. Fires are not permitted so it is recommended that walkers bring their own fuel stove.

== See also ==
- List of long-distance hiking tracks in Australia
