= Ringtail Creek, Queensland =

Ringtail Creek
- Suburb
- Interactive map of Ringtail Creek
- Coordinates: 26.34°S 152.9511°E
- Country: Australia
- State: Queensland
- LGA: Shire of Noosa
- Location: 14.7 km (9.1 mi) NW of Tewantin; 53.0 km (32.9 mi) SE of Gympie; 53.5 km (33.2 mi) NNW of Maroochydore; 139 km (86 mi) N of Brisbane

Government
  - State electorate: Noosa
  - Federal division: Wide Bay

Area
  - Total: 35.4 km^{2} (13.7 sq mi)

Population
  - Total: 203 (2021 census)
  - Density: 5.734/km^{2} (14.85/sq mi)
- Time zone: UTC+10:00 (AEST)
- Postcode: 4565
Suburbs around Ringtail Creek
Cootharaba	Cootharaba	Noosa North Shore
Pomona	Ringtail Creek	Cooroibah
Pomona	Lake MacDonald	Cooroibah

Ringtail Creek is a rural locality in the Shire of Noosa, Queensland, Australia. In the 2021 census, Ringtail Creek had a population of 203 people.

== Geography ==
The locality is in the northern Sunshine Coast hinterland.

The north-eastern boundary follows the Noosa River where it leaves Lake Cootharaba. A small section in the west belongs to the Mary River catchment area. A large portion of the locality is protected within the Ringtail Forest Reserve.

The town of Cooloothin is at 26.3132°S 152.9735°E.

Sealys Lagoon is a lagoon on Ringfield Creek (the watercourse) on the eastern border of the locality (26.3355°S 152.9919°E).

== History ==
By 1875, a sugarcane plantation had been established at Cooloothin Creek by 1875.

In July 1880, the Queensland Government sold off 61 town allotments in Cooloothin. A few houses remain on the northern edge of the town but the southern part of the town is now Tewah Park.

Ringtail State School opened on 1 May 1912 and closed in 1943. It was located on the north-east corner of Gards Road and Ringtail Creek Road (approximately 26.3493°S 152.9336°E), now the south-western corner of the Ringtail State Forest. The site is marked.

Cooloothin Creek Provisional opened on 16 August 1915. On 1 May 1929 it became Cooloothin Creek State School. It closed in 1936.

Between 2008 and 2013, Ringtail Creek (and the rest of the Shire of Noosa) was within Sunshine Coast Region.

Sealys Lagoon was gazetted on 27 November 2015. It was named after Cyril Sealy (1905–1959), who purchased Portion 298, Parish of Noosa in 1947. In the 1930s and 1940s Cyril and his brother Albert were lifesaving volunteers Noosa Life Saving Club who patrolled the Noosa beaches to assist swimmers needing help. They also served as volunteer lifesaving instructors for the club. Other members of the Sealy family were active volunteers in the club and in other community groups.

== Demographics ==
In the 2011 census, Ringtail Creek had a population of 180 people.

In the 2016 census, Ringtail Creek had a population of 197 people.

In the 2021 census, Ringtail Creek had a population of 203 people.

== Education ==
There are no schools in Ringtail Creek. The nearest government primary schools are Tewantin State School in Tewantin to the south-east, Cooroy State School in Cooroy to the south, and Pomona State School in neighbouring Pomona to the south-west. The nearest government secondary school is Noosa District State High School which has its junior campus at Pomona and its senior campus at Cooroy.

== Amenities ==
There is a boat ramp and jetty at Bundoora Street (26.3122°S 152.9757°E) providing access to Cooloothin Creek (a tributary of Lake Cootharaba. They are managed by the Noosa Shire Council.
