= Teewah, Queensland =

Teewah
- Town
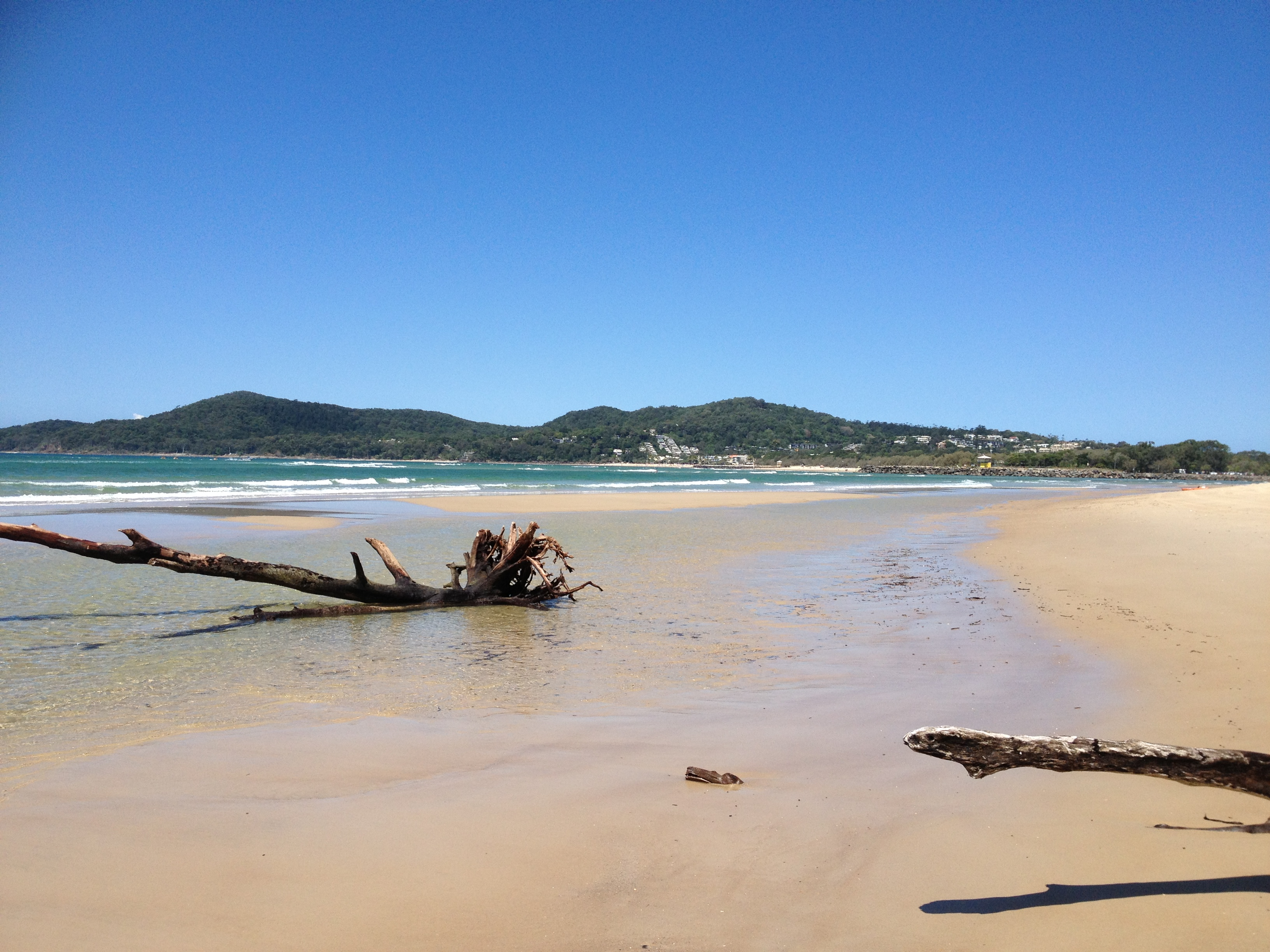
- Teewah Beach, Queensland looking south towards Noosa Heads

- Interactive map of Teewah
- Coordinates: 26.273°S 153.051°E
- Country: Australia
- State: Queensland
- LGA: Shire of Noosa
- Location: 6 km (3.7 mi) NW of Noosa North Shore; 77 km (48 mi) E of Gympie; 156 km (97 mi) N of Brisbane

Government
  - State electorate: Noosa
  - Federal division: Wide Bay

Area
  - Total: 3 km^{2} (1.2 sq mi)
- Elevation: 10 m (33 ft)
- Postcode: 4565
Localities around Teewah
Como	Como	Coral Sea
Lake Cooroibah	Teewah	Coral Sea
Noosa North Shore	Noosa North Shore	Noosa North Shore

Teewah is a town within the locality of Noosa North Shore in the Shire of Noosa, Queensland, Australia. It is 25 kilometres (16 mi) north of the large city centre of Noosa Heads. It is inaccessible by road. It is a well known camping area and offroad vehicles can drive on the beach.

== History ==
Between 2008 and Teewah, Noosa North Shore (and the rest of the Shire of Noosa) was within Sunshine Coast Region.
