= Noosa River Ferry =

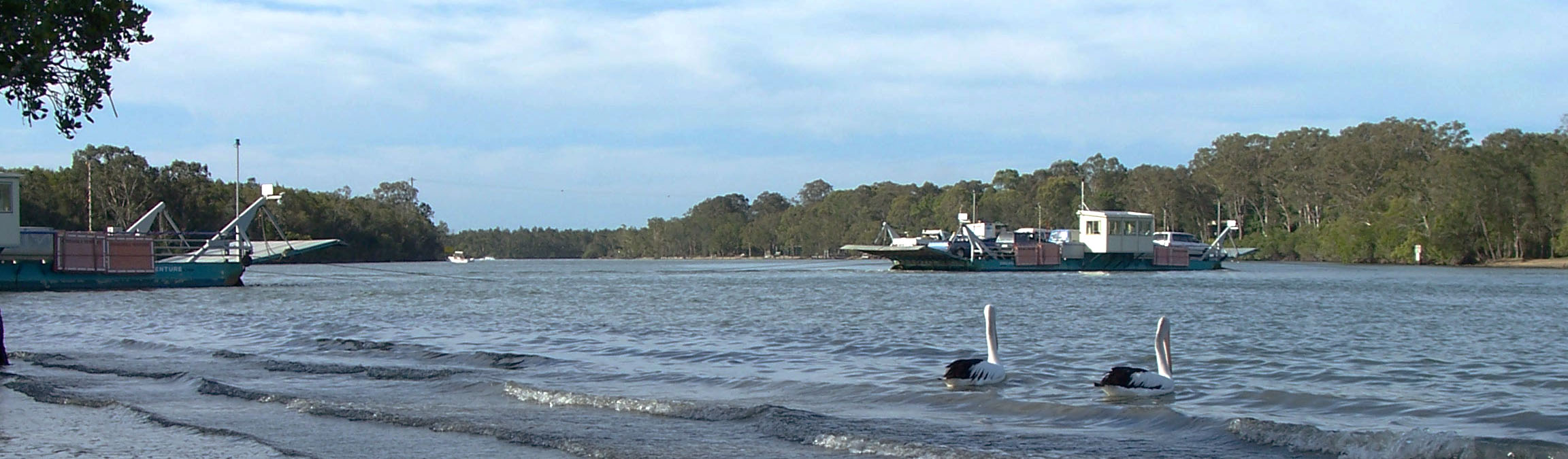

The Noosa River Ferries (also known as Noosa North Shore Ferries) are two cable ferries crossing the Noosa River at Tewantin in Queensland, Australia.

Originally installed to service the mineral sand industry operating in the Teewah Beach area, the ferries are now used to provide access to Teewah Beach, Cooloola National Park and the growing suburb of Noosa North Shore located on the northern bank of the Noosa River.

In 2022, the contract for the service was awarded by Noosa Council to Entrada Travel Group, beginning in July 2024 for a 20-year period. The previous operator operated under contract to the council between 1999 and 2024.
