= Como, Queensland =

Como Sunshine Coast, Queensland
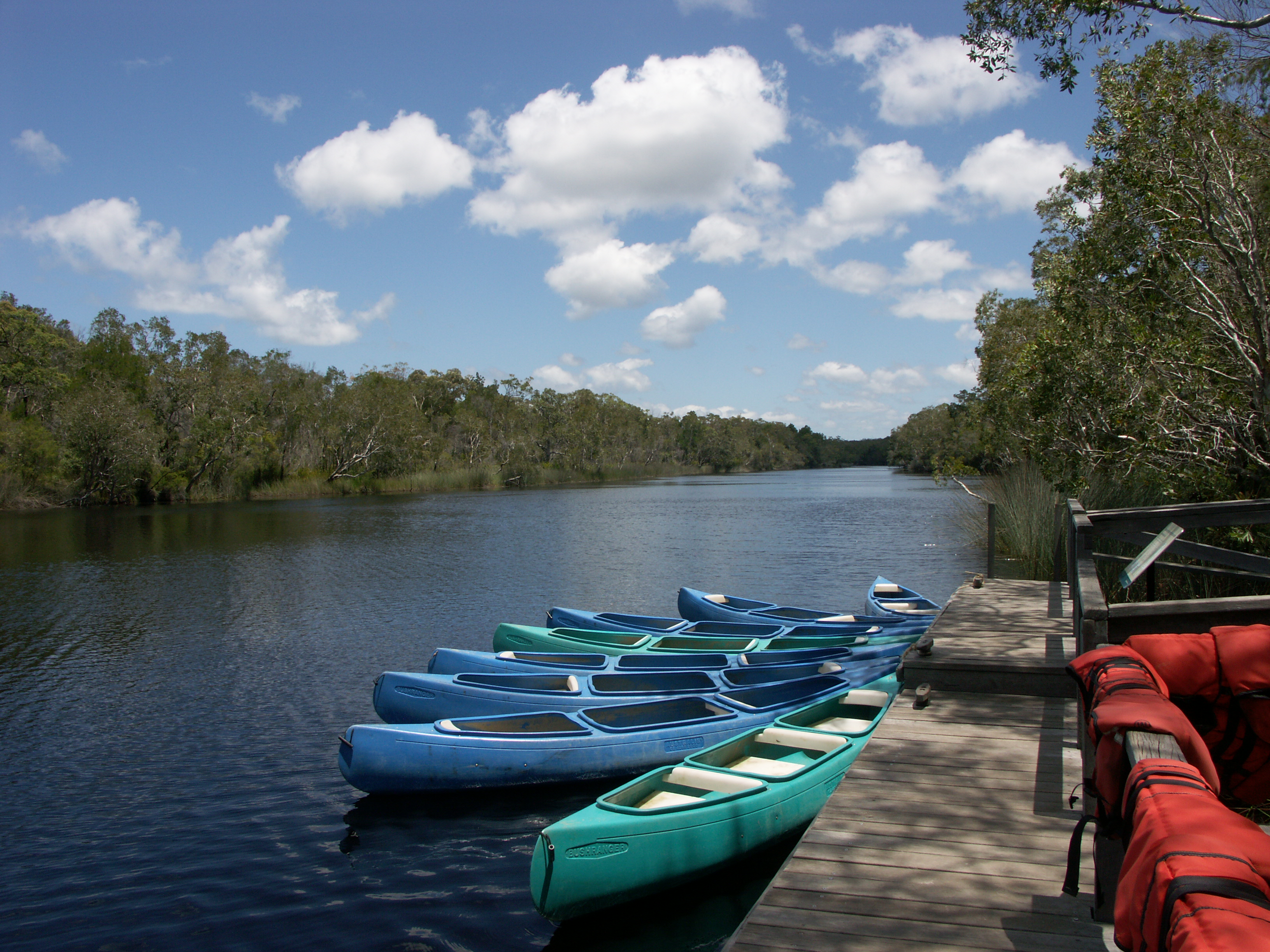
- Kayaks on the Noosa River at Harry's Hut, 2011

- Coordinates: 26.2483°S 153.0094°E
- Population: 54 (2021 census)
  - Density: 0.520/km^{2} (1.347/sq mi)
- Postcode(s): 4571
- Elevation: 20 m (66 ft)
- Area: 103.8 km^{2} (40.1 sq mi)
- Time zone: AEST (UTC+10:00)
- Location: 34.1 km (21 mi) NNW of Tewantin; 35.8 km (22 mi) E of Gympie; 163 km (101 mi) N of Brisbane
- LGA(s): Shire of Noosa
- State electorate(s): Noosa
- Federal division(s): Wide Bay
Suburbs around Como:
Toolara Forest	Cooloola	Cooloola
Coondoo	Como	Noosa North Shore
Kin Kin	Cootharaba	Noosa North Shore

Como is a rural locality in the Shire of Noosa, Queensland, Australia. In the 2021 census, Como had a population of 54 people.

== Geography ==
Como is on the Sunshine Coast, 47.8 kilometres (30 mi) north-west of Noosa Heads, immediately south of the boundary between the Shire of Noosa and Gympie Region (to the north).

The locality is bordered to the north-east and east by the Noosa River and to the south-east by the shore of Lake Cootharaba.

Much of the locality is within protected areas. Most of the east of the locality is within the Great Sandy National Park with part of the west of the locality within the Toolara State Forest. The south-west of the locality has rural residential land and is also used for grazing and crop-growing. The north of the locality also has grazing.

== History ==
Historically, this area has been logged for timber, resulting in a number of campsites and small townships established for the timber workers. Transport of the timber and workers was mostly by boat.

Harry's Hut was built in 1957 as a shelter for timber workers from a local campsite to use during heavy rainfall. After the logging ceased in the 1960s, the hut was purchased by Harry Spring who operated pharmacies in Pomona and Cooroy. He used the hut as a base while fishing in the Noosa River. Following his death in 1999, the hut came under the control of the National Parks department of the Queensland Government, but it continues to bear his name.

Between 2008 and 2013, Como was within Sunshine Coast Region. In 2008, the Queensland Government forced Shire of Noosa to amalgamate, resulting in the new local government area of Sunshine Coast Region. However, a vote of former Shire of Noosa residents was taken to de-amalgamate, and Shire of Noosa was re-established in 2014.

== Heritage listings ==
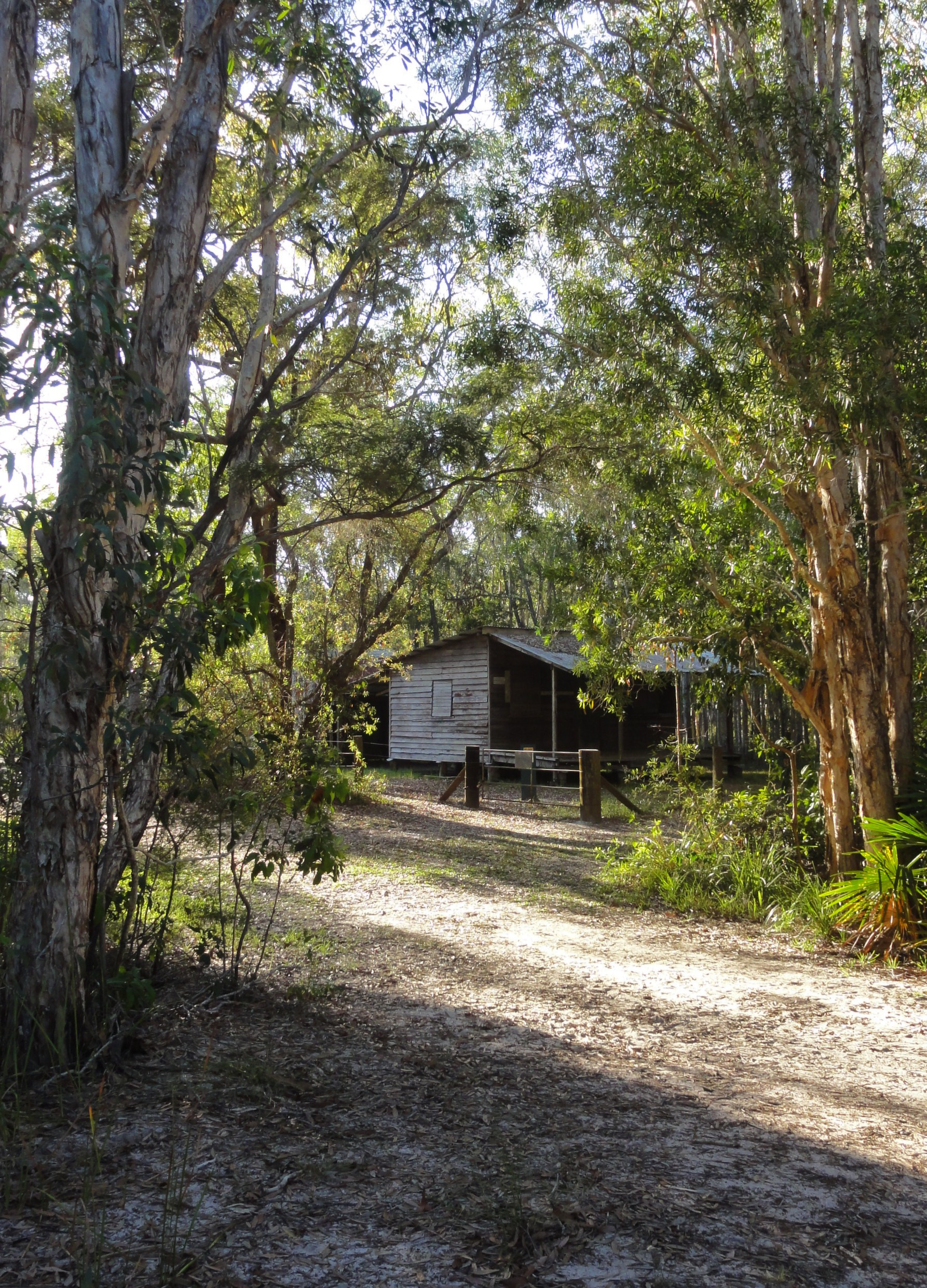
Harry's Hut, 2011

Como has a number of heritage-listed sites, including:

- Elanda Point on Lake Cootharaba: Mill Point Settlement Site (26.2478°S 153.0001°E)
- Lake Cootharaba (26.266°S 153.016°E)
- Harry's Hut, Harrys Hut Road (26.19126°S 153.02994°E)

== Demographics ==
In the 2016 census, Como had a population of 46 people.

In the 2021 census, Como had a population of 54 people.

== Economy ==
There are a number of homesteads in the locality:

- Como Park (26.2098°S 152.9500°E)
- Cootharaba (26.2241°S 152.9397°E)
- Tarangau (26.1775°S 152.9815°E)

== Education ==
There are no schools in Como. The nearest government primary school is Kin Kin State School in neighbouring Kin Kin to the south-west. The nearest government secondary school is Noosa District State High School which has its junior campus in Pomona to the south-west and its senior campus in Cooroy to the south.

== Attractions ==
Harry's Hut recreational area is a day-use and camping area on the shores of the Noosa River in the Great Sandy National Park. These facilities are at the northern end of Harrys Hut Road.

== See also ==
- List of tramways in Queensland
