= Lake Wabby =

Lake in Queensland, Australia

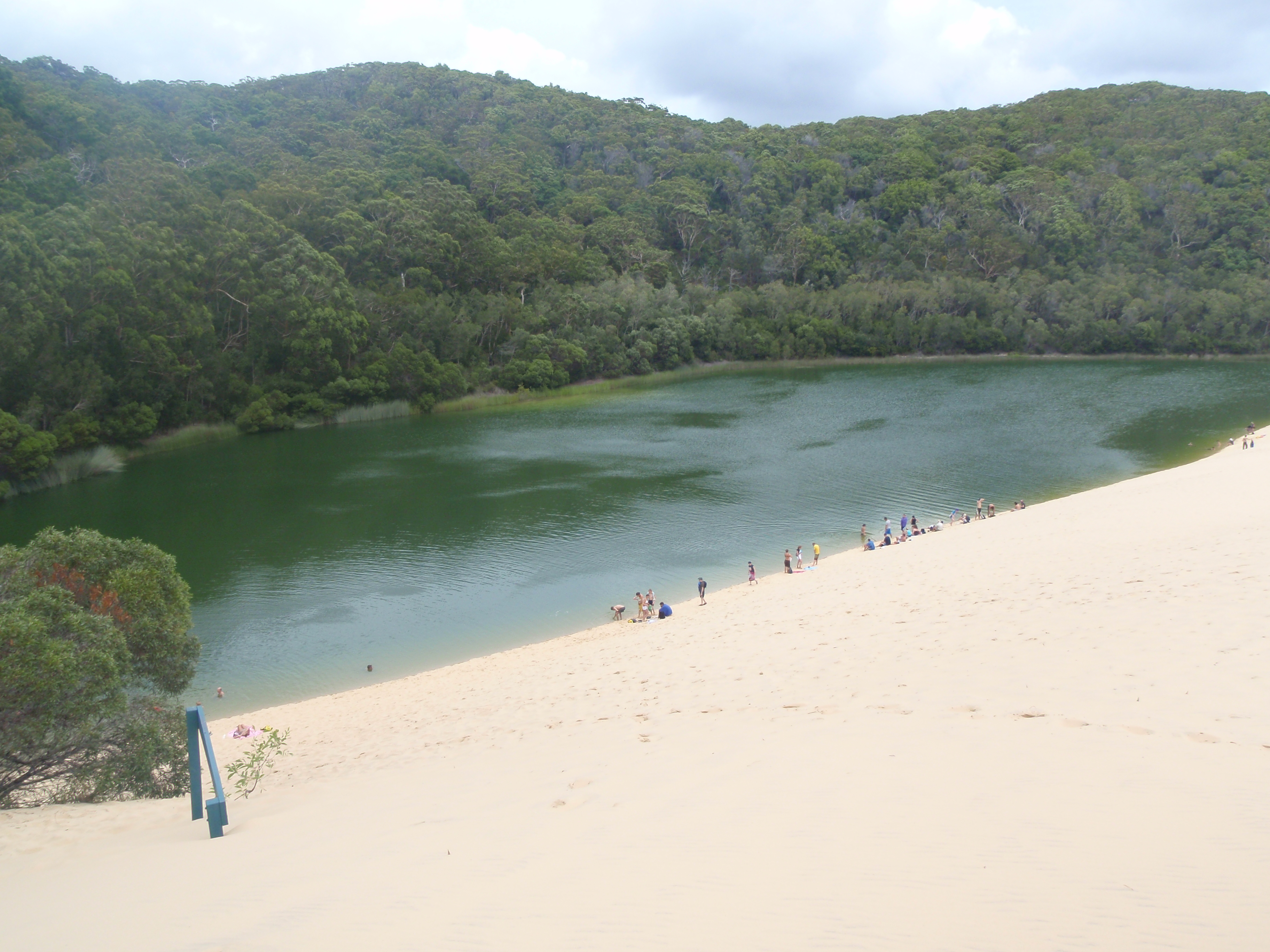

- Location within Queensland
- Location: K'gari
- Coordinates: 25°27′29″S 153°07′47″E
- Primary inflows: Natural spring
- Primary outflows: None
- Basin countries: Australia
- Max. depth: 12 m (39 ft)

Lake Wabby is a small freshwater, green colored lake. It is located in the Great Sandy National Park on the eastern side of K'gari off the coast of Queensland, Australia. The lake is directly adjacent to the Hammerstone Sandblow, which is slowly moving into the lake. Eventually it will disappear under the sand.

Unlike most other lakes on K'gari which are too acidic, Lake Wabby provides habitat to several species of fish. Thirteen species have been identified.

The lakes is both a window lake and a barrage lake. Barrage lakes form when water flows from a natural spring are blocked by a sandmass. With a maximum depth of 12 m, it is the deepest lake on the island.

Lake Wabby has cultural significance to the Butchulla people.

== Facilities ==
The Queensland Parks and Wildlife Service provides toilets, a walk-in camping area, a lookout and various walking tracks from the carpark to and around the lake.

== See also ==
- List of lakes of Australia
