= Kin Kin =

- Town
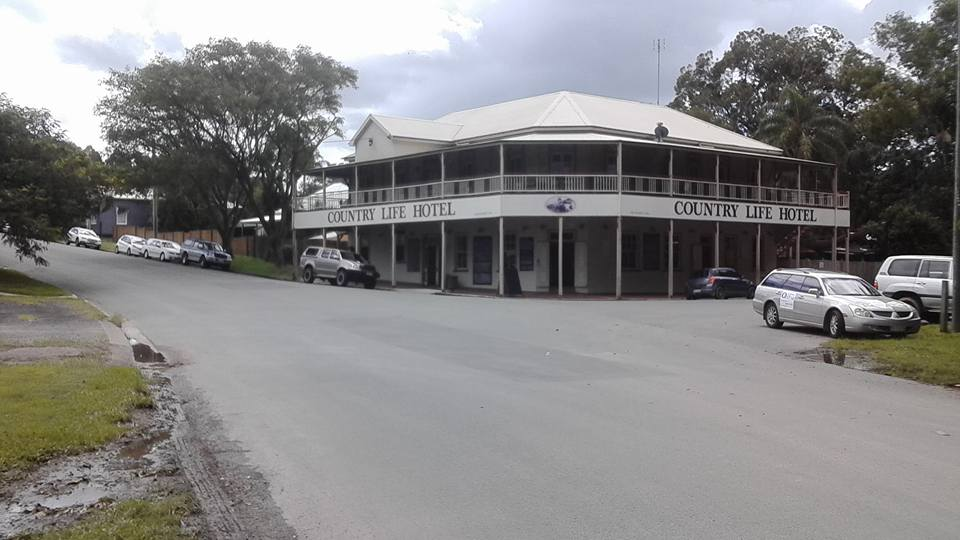
- The Country Life Hotel on Main Street, Kin Kin, 2018

- Interactive map of Kin Kin
- Coordinates: 26.2633°S 152.8733°E
- Country: Australia
- State: Queensland
- LGA: Shire of Noosa
- Location: 30.6 km (19.0 mi) ESE of Gympie; 34.7 km (21.6 mi) NE of Tewantin; 65.7 km (40.8 mi) NNW of Maroochydore; 160 km (99 mi) N of Brisbane

Government
  - State electorate: Noosa
  - Federal division: Wide Bay

Area
  - Total: 98.6 km^{2} (38.1 sq mi)
- Elevation: 64 m (210 ft)

Population
  - Total: 844 (2021 census)
  - Density: 8.560/km^{2} (22.170/sq mi)
- Time zone: UTC+10:00 (AEST)
- Postcode: 4571
Localities around Kin Kin
Neusa Vale	Neusa Vale; Coondoo	Como
Cedar Pocket; Mothar Mountain	Kin Kin	Como; Cootharaba
Cooran	Pinbarren	Cootharaba

Kin Kin is a rural town and locality in the Shire of Noosa, Queensland, Australia. In the 2021 census, the locality of Kin Kin had a population of 844 people.

== Geography ==
Kin Kin lies between Pomona to the south, and Gympie to the north, in South East Queensland. The town is a hub for recreational activities related to nearby Lake Cootharaba and the Great Sandy National Park. Kin Kin is in the Noosa Biosphere, Queensland's first UNESCO Biosphere.

In the west of Kin Kin is Woondum National Park and Woondum Forest Reserve. The hills and mountains in this area are covered by eucalypt forest and rainforest.

== History ==
There has long been debate over the origin of the name Kin Kin. It is most widely believed to mean "plenty black ants" after the small black ants very common in the area. This is reflected in the local school newsletter "Kin Kin ANTics" and the large ant sculpture outside the Kin Kin General store, home of Black Ant Gourmet. Some sources suggest the name comes from the Aboriginal kauin kauin meaning red soil.

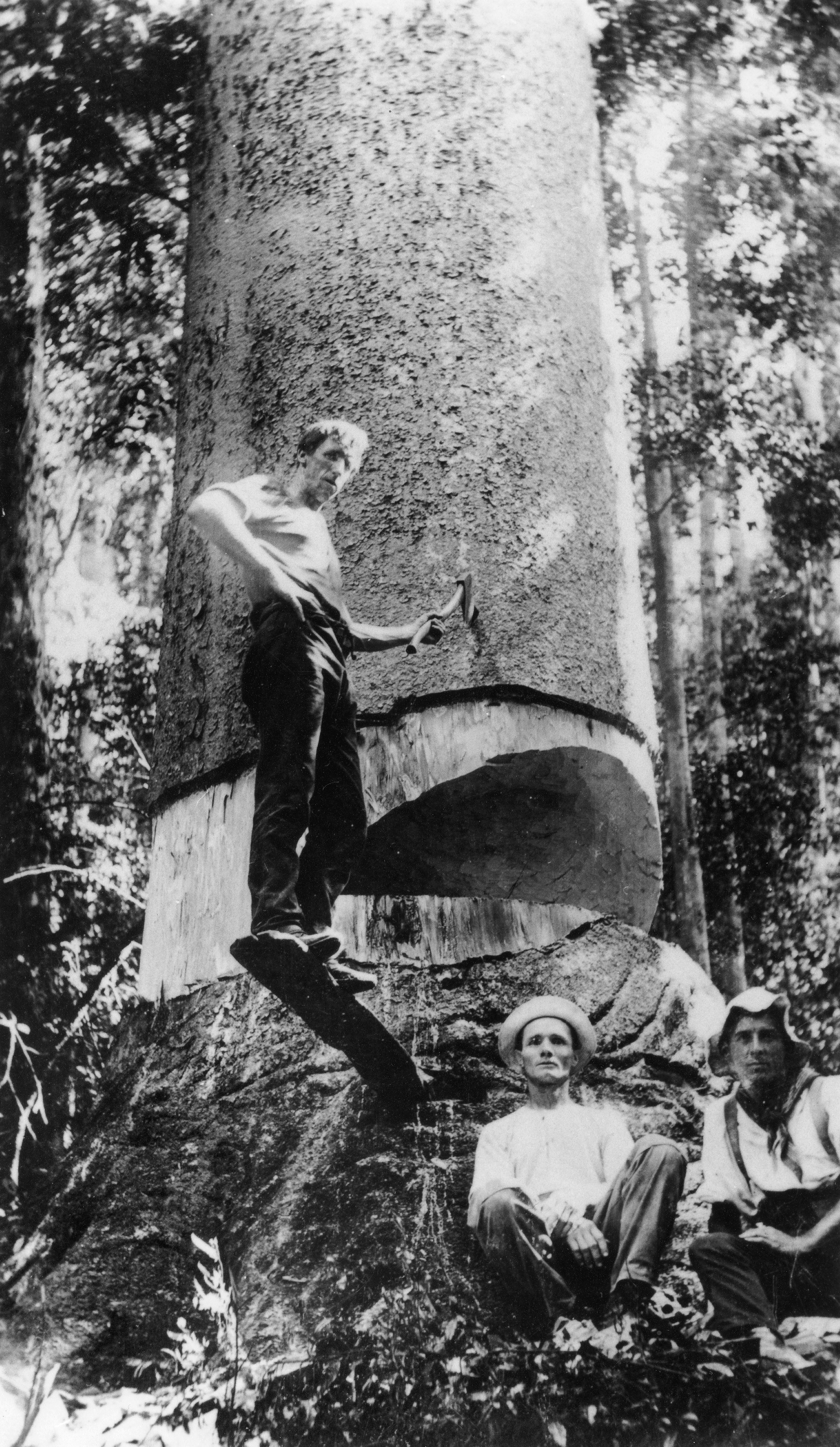
Axeman Hillcoat felling a tree in the Kin Kin district ca. 1915

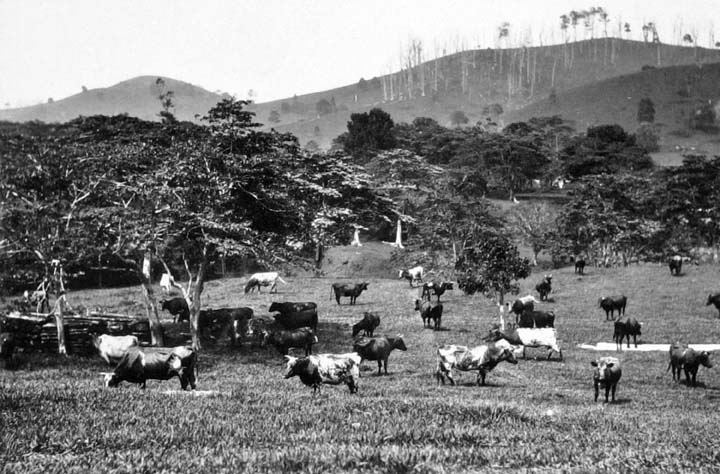
Illawarra Dairy Cattle on Mr G Grevetts farm at Kin Kin, circa 1931

Timber-getters moved into the area in the late 1870s. Later it became a smallcrop and dairy farming community, from then on land and farm usage started to change and there was a decline in production farms. Early deforestation and clearing of land led to small produce and dairy farming from the early 1900s. The banana industry boomed in the years after World War 1, but experienced a significant decline in the 1930s as prices fell. Beans and Zucchini were major crops for many years, but smallcropping declined from the 1980s and is now undertaken on a limited basis.

The family of William Douglas Francis, one of Queensland's pioneering botanists, moved to the area circa 1906. Many native trees first identified by him are found in the area.

Kin Kin State School opened on 26 May 1909 with the arrival of the first teacher Kathleen Storer. In 1917 it was renamed Kin Kin Junction State School (to avoid confusion with the school in the town of Kin Kin, now known as Kin Kin State School). It closed on 18 August 1981. It was at 984 Pomona Kin Kin Road (26.2841°S 152.8764°E). The Kin Kin Arboretum now occupies the site and the school building was relocated in 1986 to the Kin Kin Sports Group for use as a community centre.

Moran Group Provisional School opened on 7 March 1910. On 1 September 1914 it became Moran Group State School. It closed on 17 August 1952. It was located on Moran Group Road (approx. 26.2207°S 152.8819°E).

Wahpunga State School opened on 15 August 1910 and closed on 31 December 1967. It was located at 502 Gympie Kin Kin Road (26.2375°S 152.9079°E) and is now Wahpunga School Park.

Kin Kin School of Arts opened on Friday 14 July 1911. It comprised a reading room, a library room, and a hall. The building as a whole was 50 by 28 feet (15.2 by 8.5 m) with a small stage, furnished with a piano by Mr. Sedgeman of Gympie.

Kin Kin Methodist Church opened on 10 December 1916. In 1977 with the amalgamation of the Methodist Church into the Uniting Church in Australia, it became Kin Kin Uniting Church (also known as Kin Kin Junction Uniting Church). It closed as a church in April 2002. It was at 980 Pomona Kin Kin Road (26.2845°S 152.8758°E). The building is still extant, but in private ownership.

Kin Kin Township Provisional School opened on 18 October 1916, with classes initially held in the School of Arts hall. An unused school building was moved from Crawford (near Kingaroy) to Kin Kin and classes commenced in the new building on 14 March 1921. On 1 September 1921, it was renamed Kin Kin Township State School. On 19 October 1923 it was renamed Kin Kin State School. The building was extended in 1923 and an additional classroom opened on 12 March 1928. A teachers residence was built in 1930. The original school was shifted and later demolished to make way for a new building which officially opened on 7 April 1962. This building is still in use, with two additional classroom buildings, a kitchen, and undercover area in the immediate surrounds.

At the start of the 2022 school year the enrolment totalled 47 students with 5 teaching staff and 8 non-teaching staff.

On 17 February 1924, a severe storm caused substantial damage to the School of Arts hall which was reconstructed by July.

In 1926, St Mary's Catholic Church opened in Bowman Street. It was destroyed in the 1985 storm.

On 19 November 1926, St Luke's Anglican Church was dedicated by Archbishop Gerald Sharp. It closed circa August 2020. It was deconsecrated in June 2021. It was at 3 Grady Street (26.2642°S 152.8741°E).

A storm and associated tornado on 16 January 1930 brought 6 inches (152mm) of rain in an hour. It caused flash flooding and damage to crops and many buildings.

On the morning of 22 September 1932, a severe thunderstorm produced a tornado estimated at 100 yards (91m) wide which travelled from the Cooran tablelands through the Sister Tree, Wahpunga, Eulama, and Cootharaba districts before crossing Lake Doonella and going out to sea. While no injuries were reported, many trees and crops were affected and a number of buildings damaged or destroyed. A hail storm several hours later caused further damage.

A severe hailstorm on the afternoon of 10 October 1933 dumped 6 inches (152mm) of rain in 20 minutes causing flash flooding, and left drifts of hail up to 3 feet (91 cm) deep. Extensive damage was reported to businesses in the main street, and to banana plantations, small crops, and buildings in surrounding areas.

The butter factory was closed in 1937. Deregulation of the milk industry led to the exit of all but a handful of family dairy farms. The last farms (in order of closure, Davis, Ferris, and Shepperson) had closed by 2012.

On 14 August 1971, a tornado passed through the town killing Mr and Mrs WHT Fleet of Moran Group, and 13 month old Deborah Joy Lister of Wahpunga. 8 homes were completely destroyed, in total 25 buildings were damaged or destroyed, and the damage was estimated at over $100,000 (1971 dollars). Large hail was also reported.

From 1980 the "Great Kin Kin Horse Race" and associated Carnival was held annually on a hilly 3 km course over the southern end of the Wahpunga Range, starting and finishing at the showgrounds behind the Country Life Hotel. After peaking in popularity in the late 1980s and early 1990s, the race was eventually discontinued, with the last Carnival being held in 2004. The horse ride has been revived as an annual social ride covering 25 km on the Noosa Trail Network from the Kin Kin Showgrounds to Tablelands Lookout near Cooran and back.

A hail storm and associated tornado hit on 28 February 1985, destroying the Butter Factory and causing widespread property damage, including to St Luke's Anglican Church (rebuilt) and St Mary's Catholic Church (not rebuilt).

On 4 November 1994, a severe storm produced large hail and a tornado which damaged or completely destroyed several buildings.

In 2007, a plan to develop a $400 million eco-tourism resort east of Kin Kin was rejected by the Government of Queensland on the grounds that the development was not part of the regional planning document.

Although currently and historically within the Shire of Noosa, between 2008 and 2013 the Shire of Noosa (and hence Kin Kin) was within the Sunshine Coast Region) until 2014 when the shire was re-instated following a vote by the residents.

On 2 April 2009, the town was hit by the highest flooding on record from Kin Kin Creek, a tributary of the Noosa River following intense rainfall. 78 year old local resident Margarida Jackson died after her car was swept off a bridge over the Kin Kin Creek West Branch, the Country Life Hotel on Main Street was inundated with 3m of water and there was widespread property damage and loss of livestock. A further flood on 13 April 2009 again inundated the Country Life Hotel.

Intense rainfall starting on 22 February 2022 and totaling 355mm in 24 hours saw flooding from Kin Kin Creek a metre deep through the Kin Kin Hotel (formerly Country Life Hotel) on Wednesday February 23rd. A number of residents helped to move furniture before the flood and then wash out mud after the water subsided. For the month of February Kin Kin received 1,159.8mm of rain, the highest for any month since records began.

== Demographics ==
In the 2006 census, the locality of Kin Kin had a population of 546 people.

In the 2011 census, the locality of Kin Kin had a population of 694 people.

In the 2016 census, the locality of Kin Kin had a population of 764 people.

In the 2021 census, the locality of Kin Kin had a population of 844 people.

== Heritage listings ==
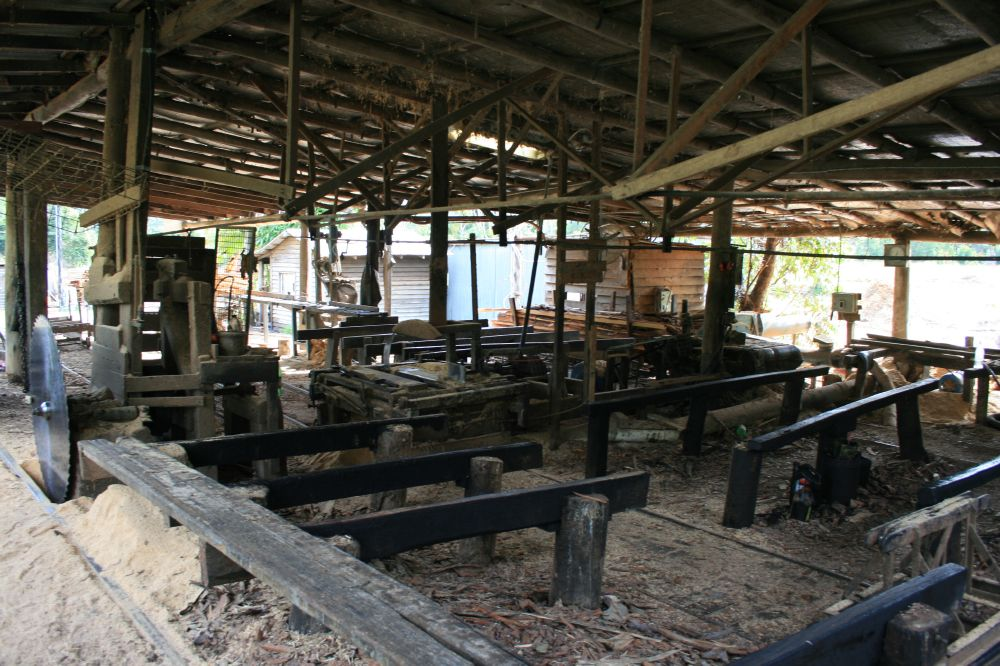
Interior of Kin Kin Sawmill, 2009

Kin Kin has a number of heritage-listed sites, including:

- Kin Kin Masonic Lodge, Bowman Street
- St Luke's Anglican Church (deconsecrated in June 2021), Grady Street
- Kin Kin State School, Main Street
- Kin Kin Memorial School of Arts, Main Street
- Former Post Office, Main Street
- Former ES&A Bank and residence, Main Street
- Country Life Hotel, Corner Main Street & Wahpunga Road
- Kin Kin Junction Uniting Church (now a private residence), Pomona Kin Kin Road
- Kin Kin Sawmill, 1 Sister Tree Creek Road

== Economy ==
Kin Kin Sawmill is still operating.

Many original farms have been subdivided into small hobby farms, some growing fruit trees, and many carrying horses or beef cattle. Today Kin Kin boasts health retreats, accommodation, small businesses, artists, a rock quarry and bush foods.

== Education ==
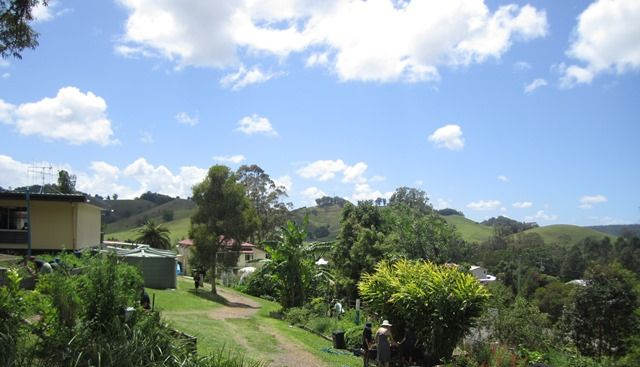
Kin Kin State School, 2015

Kin Kin State School is a government primary (Prep–6) school for boys and girls at Main Street (26.2624°S 152.8718°E). In 2018, the school had an enrolment of 62 students with 9 teachers (4 full-time equivalent) and 7 non-teaching staff (3 full-time equivalent). It includes a special education program.

There are no secondary schools in Kin Kin. The nearest government secondary school is Noosa District State High School which has two sites:

- Years 7–8 at the Pomona campus
- Years 9–12 at the Cooroy campus

== Amenities ==
The Shire of Noosa operates a mobile library service on a weekly schedule at the Kin Kin school.

There are public toilets and a playground in the park next to the Memorial School of Arts Hall, and public toilets, a barbecue, and shelter at Wahpunga School Park.

The Kin Kin Tennis Courts are located behind the Memorial School of Arts Hall.

There is a skate park and public camping available on the oval behind the Country Life Hotel.

The Kin Kin Arboretum is located 2.5 kilometres (1.6 mi) south of the village.

== See also ==
- List of reduplicated Australian place names
