= Kin Kin Sawmill =

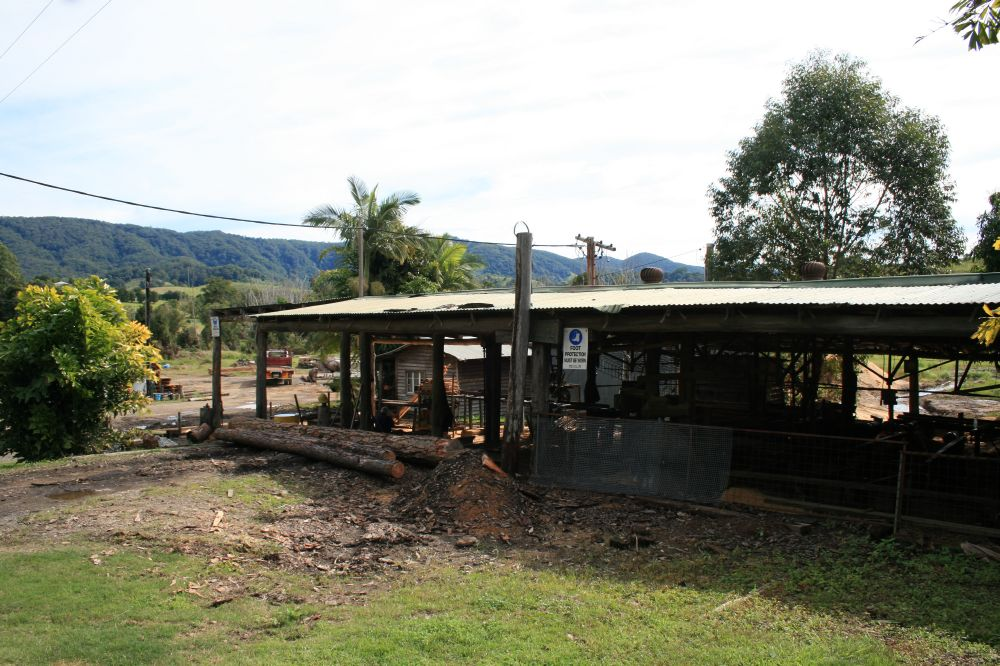
- Kin Kin Sawmill, 2009

- Location within Queensland Location within Australia
- 26.2621°S 152.8688°E
- Location: 1 Sister Tree Creek Road, Kin Kin, Shire of Noosa, Queensland, Australia

History
- Design period: 1940s–1960s (post-World War II)
- Built: 1940s

Site notes
- Owner: Geoff Ellis

Queensland Heritage Register
- Official name: Kin Kin Sawmill
- Type: state heritage (built)
- Designated: 27 November 2008
- Reference no.: 602686
- Significant period: 1940s–1950s
- Significant components: machinery/plant/equipment – forestry/timber industry, shed – machinery, lumber yard

Kin Kin Sawmill is a heritage-listed sawmill at 1 Sister Tree Creek Road, Kin Kin, Shire of Noosa, Queensland, Australia. It was built in 1940s. It was added to the Queensland Heritage Register on 27 November 2008.

== History ==
The Kin Kin Sawmill, established in 1948 by Arthur Hempsall and his son Lionel, is located midway between Gympie and Noosa in the Sunshine Coast township of the same name. The Hempsall family owned the mill until 1991 when it was sold to Geoff Ellis. It continues to operate as a small mill with much of its original machinery and layout still intact.

South Queensland produced the largest amount of timber in the Queensland by the middle of the 20th century: in the North Coast region (now known as the Sunshine Coast), there were some 122 sawmills in 1949, the largest number in the Queensland. The quantity of logs cut on the North Coast in 1947–48 was over 40000, the third largest in Queensland behind Brisbane and Atherton.

The Kin Kin sawmill was originally established to produce wooden packing cases for the local fruit growing industry. The North Coast was an important fruit growing region and during the first half of the 20th century, Kin Kin was one of Queensland most productive banana-growing areas. The sawmill produced cases for bananas, pineapples, beans, apples and plums. Cases were railed from Pomona railway station to destinations as far afield as Brisbane and the fruit growing areas near Stanthorpe.

Case milling was an important industry associated with fruit growing. It was valued because it provided a useful outlet for timber which would otherwise have no economic value. There was a high demand for fruit and vegetable cases in the immediate post-War period with case milling peaking in 1949. 45% of cases were manufactured for packaging fresh fruit but they were also used for a range of other foodstuffs and manufactured goods. By the early 1950s, corrugated fibre board containers, developed during World War II, began to compete with the traditional wooden cases and the latter experienced a steady decline in use. By 1955–56 there were still some 58 wooden case manufacturers in Queensland comprising mostly small firms. Some 40% of the case millers in Queensland also milled timber for other uses.

Although not dissimilar in layout to other types of sawmills, case mills were typically smaller in scale owing to the smaller size of the logs that were milled and the smaller size of the end product. A three-person mill, comprising a single circular saw bench (number one bench) and a docking saw, could produce up to 500 cases per day. Logs were broken down at the number one bench into longitudinal lengths of timber (flitches). The flitches were cut to required length at the docking saw. Waste material from the initial breaking down process (including edging) was cut down for firewood at the docking saw or disposed of. The lengths of timber ready for assembly as cases were known as "shooks".

Larger, general purpose mills typically comprised three circular saws and a docker. The initial break-down of the log was usually carried out at the Canadian bench (the largest circular saw). Further sizing was carried out at number one and two benches and the planks were cut to length at the docker.

When initially erected, the Kin Kin mill comprised only the number one saw bench and a docking saw. Both of these saws are still extant, but the docking saw has been relocated within the shed. The saws were powered by a tractor. Probably from the early 1950s after the mill was connected to electricity, a Canadian Saw, and number two bench were added and the docking saw was moved. The mill layout has remained largely unchanged since then. In its present form it resembles a typical sawmill layout of the 1950s. The original hand-operated winch for moving logs through the breakdown saw remains extant and also the early electrical insulators tracing the original path of the cabling along the underside of the roof.

The mill originally cut soft wood timber for cases. This was cut to the required lengths and then packaged for delivery to the farmers who assembled the cases. The mill subsequently moved into cutting timber for pallets, and hardwood milling for electricity pole cross-arms and railway sleepers. In 2007, the mill was cutting softwood for assembly into packing cases for glass. It is one of the few sawmills of its era that is still operating on the North Coast.

== Description ==
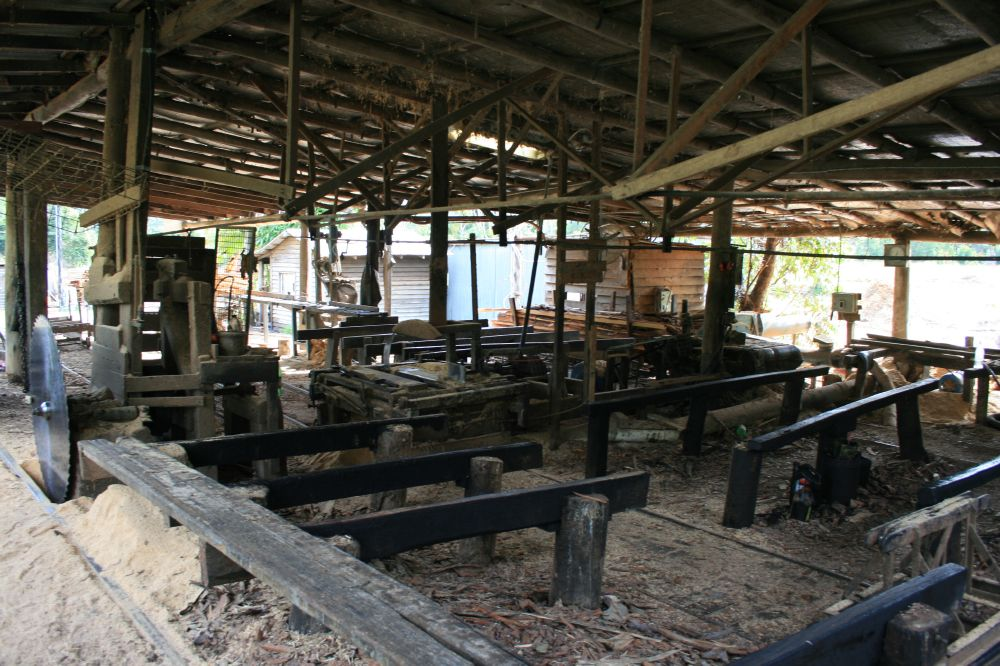
Sawmill interior, 2009

Standing against the backdrop of the surrounding hills on Sister Tree Creek Road west of the town of Kin Kin, the Kin Kin Sawmill occupies a flat open area to the east of Kin Kin Creek. The structures associated with the sawmill operations comprise the large open mill shed, a small timber office building, a number of timber and corrugated iron sheds and the sawdust/waste area. The site also accommodates timber storage areas and forklift and other vehicle parking.

Sawmill shed Standing close to the road at the southeast corner of the site, the heart of the mill operations is an open timber-framed shed with corrugated iron clad roofs. The main part is sheltered by a gable roof the north side of which extends west over the docker area and northeast with a small skillion roof over the number two bench. The shed is framed with sawn and unsawn timber, the roof supported by round posts. The compact milling operation is organised around the sequence of saws and the accompanying benches, motors, trolleys and rails accommodated within the shed. The saws stand in a line from the breakdown saw (Canadian saw) to the south to the number two bench saw to the north. Timber logs are stacked by forklift at the southwest, rolled onto a trolley where they are secured with a dog and run through the breakdown saw for the half cut. The cut logs then roll across to the number one bench saw where the bark is stripped and the half logs are cut into 2-or-2.5-inch (51 or 64 mm) width planks. The cut planks are stacked north of the number one bench and taken across to the number two bench saw where they are cut into thinner 1 inch (25 mm) boards which are stacked to the west and taken across to the docker where they are cut into shorter lengths (mostly 6 metres (20 ft)). From here the boards pass to the groover where the sides are grooved before being placed in the pallet stack west of the log stack. A number of trolleys on rails take the offcuts and waste from the various bench areas out to the west side of the shed.

The original hand-operated winch for moving logs through the breakdown saw stands to the east of the trolley rails for the breakdown saw and the early electrical insulators trace the original path of the cabling along the underside of the roof.

== Heritage listing ==
Kin Kin Sawmill was listed on the Queensland Heritage Register on 27 November 2008 having satisfied the following criteria.

The place is important in demonstrating the evolution or pattern of Queensland's history.

The Kin Kin Sawmill (1948) is important in demonstrating the development of Queensland's timber industry insofar as it was established when the North Coast (now the Sunshine Coast) was one of the most important timber producing regions in the state. During the period that the mill was established, the North Coast contained more sawmills than anywhere else in Queensland.

As a sawmill originally established to produce timber for fruit packing cases, it is also important in demonstrating the evolution of the State's fruit growing industry. At the time, the North Coast was among the most productive fruit growing regions in the State. It is also indicative of the former use of timber as a material for packing cases. By the 1950s, timber was being superseded by corrugated fibre board as the preferred material for packaging.

The place demonstrates rare, uncommon or endangered aspects of Queensland's cultural heritage.

The sawmill is uncommon in the region as an intact example of a small saw mill originally established to produce timber for fruit packing cases. Mills of this type were common in the fruit growing areas of the State until the late 1950s when the use of wooden packing cases declined.

The mill is also uncommon in the region for its continuity of operation since the 1940s. The basic layout of the shed remains largely unchanged since the 1950s and original items of machinery continue to form key components of the operation. Economic and environmental factors have meant that sawmills of this era have become increasingly rare.

The place is important in demonstrating the principal characteristics of a particular class of cultural places.

The sawmill is a highly intact example of a small sawmill originally established to produce timber for packaging cases. The layout and all of the components typically found in a small mill of the 1950s remain including: the characteristic open-sided shed, early electrical insulators tracing the route of the original cabling, breakdown (Canadian) saw, number one and two saw benches, docking saw, original hand-operated winch, rails and trolleys. The milling operation continues to follow the traditional packing case sequence of initial cut at the breakdown (Canadian) saw, sizing at the number one and two benches and cut to lengths at the docker.
