= Electrotrichogenesis =

Electrical stimulation of hair follicles

Electrotrichogenesis (ETG) involves the stimulation of hair follicles on the scalp with the electric charge of an electrostatic field.

Three studies are listed in the PubMed database relating to the technique.

Electrotrichogenesis was approved in Europe with the CE mark, as a medical device. It was also approved by Health Canada and the Australian health office.
