= Cootharaba, Queensland =

Cootharaba
- Suburb
- Interactive map of Cootharaba
- Coordinates: 26.2483°S 152.9427°E
- Country: Australia
- State: Queensland
- City: Sunshine Coast
- LGA: Shire of Noosa
- Location: 15.7 km (9.8 mi) NE of Pomona; 18.4 km (11.4 mi) NNW of Tewantin; 24.3 km (15.1 mi) NNE of Cooroy; 161 km (100 mi) N of Brisbane

Government
  - State electorate: Noosa
  - Federal division: Wide Bay

Area
  - Total: 65.7 km^{2} (25.4 sq mi)

Population
  - Total: 866 (2021 census)
  - Density: 13.181/km^{2} (34.14/sq mi)
- Time zone: UTC+10:00 (AEST)
- Postcode: 4565
Suburbs around Cootharaba
Kin Kin	Como	Como
Kin Kin	Cootharaba	Boreen Point; Noosa North Shore
Pinbarren	Pomona	Ringtail Creek

Cootharaba is a rural locality in the Shire of Noosa, Queensland, Australia. In the 2021 census, Cootharaba had a population of 866 people.

== Geography ==
Lake Cootharaba forms part of the south-eastern boundary of Cootharaba.

A section of Tewantin National Park has been established in the southwest of Cootharaba.

== History ==
It is named after the Aboriginal name for the lake, which referred to the place where wood could be found for making notched or studded clubs.

Cootharaba School opened circa 1875 and closed circa 1891.

Cooroora Provisional School opened on 17 January 1898. On 1 January 1909, it became Cooroora State School. In 1911, it was renamed Kareewa State School. In 1933, it was renamed Boreen Junction State School. It closed in 1947. It was at 24 Cootharaba Road (26.32713°S 152.90435°E).

Cootharaba Lake State School opened on 23 August 1909. It closed in 1943. It was located on the corner of Lake Flat Road and Kildeys Road (approx 26.2647°S 152.9712°E).

Between 2008 and 2013, Cootharaba and the rest of Shire of Noosa was within the Sunshine Coast Region as a result of a forced amalgamation; however the decision was reversed and Shire of Noosa restored in 2014.

== Demographics ==
In the 2011 census, Cootharaba and surrounding suburbs recorded a population of 791.

In the 2016 census, Cootharaba had a population of 834 people.

In the 2021 census, Cootharaba had a population of 866 people.

== Education ==
There are no schools in Cootharaba. The nearest government primary school is Kin Kin State School in neighbouring Kin Kin to the west. The nearest government secondary school is Noosa District State High School, which has its junior campus in neighbouring Pomona to the south-east and its senior campus in Cooroy to the south.
