= Entrada Travel Group =

- Formerly: InterCity Group
- Industry: Tourism; Transport
- Founded: 1991
- Headquarters: Auckland, New Zealand
- Key people: Dan Alpe (CEO)
- Parent: Ritchie family (50%); Tranzit Group (50%)
- Subsidiaries: Daintree River Ferry; Greyhound Australia; InterCity; Noosa River Ferry
- Website: www.entradatravelgroup.com

Entrada Travel Group is a New Zealand transport company with operations in Australia and New Zealand. Founded in 1991 as the InterCity Group, it is owned by the Ritchie family, who formerly owned Ritchies Transport and Tranzit Group, each owning 50%.

== History ==
In 1991 a consortium of private bus and coach operators acquired the InterCity business from the New Zealand Railways Corporation. Ritchies Transport and Tranzit Group bought the other operators out in 1995.

In January 2018 it made its first purchase in Australia, Cairns based cruise company Tusa Group, followed in July 2018 by Port Douglas based Divers Den.

In July 2019 the InterCity Group was rebranded the Entrada Travel Group. Auckland Whale & Dolphin Safari was purchased in the same month. In December 2019 Frankland Island Reef Cruises was purchased.

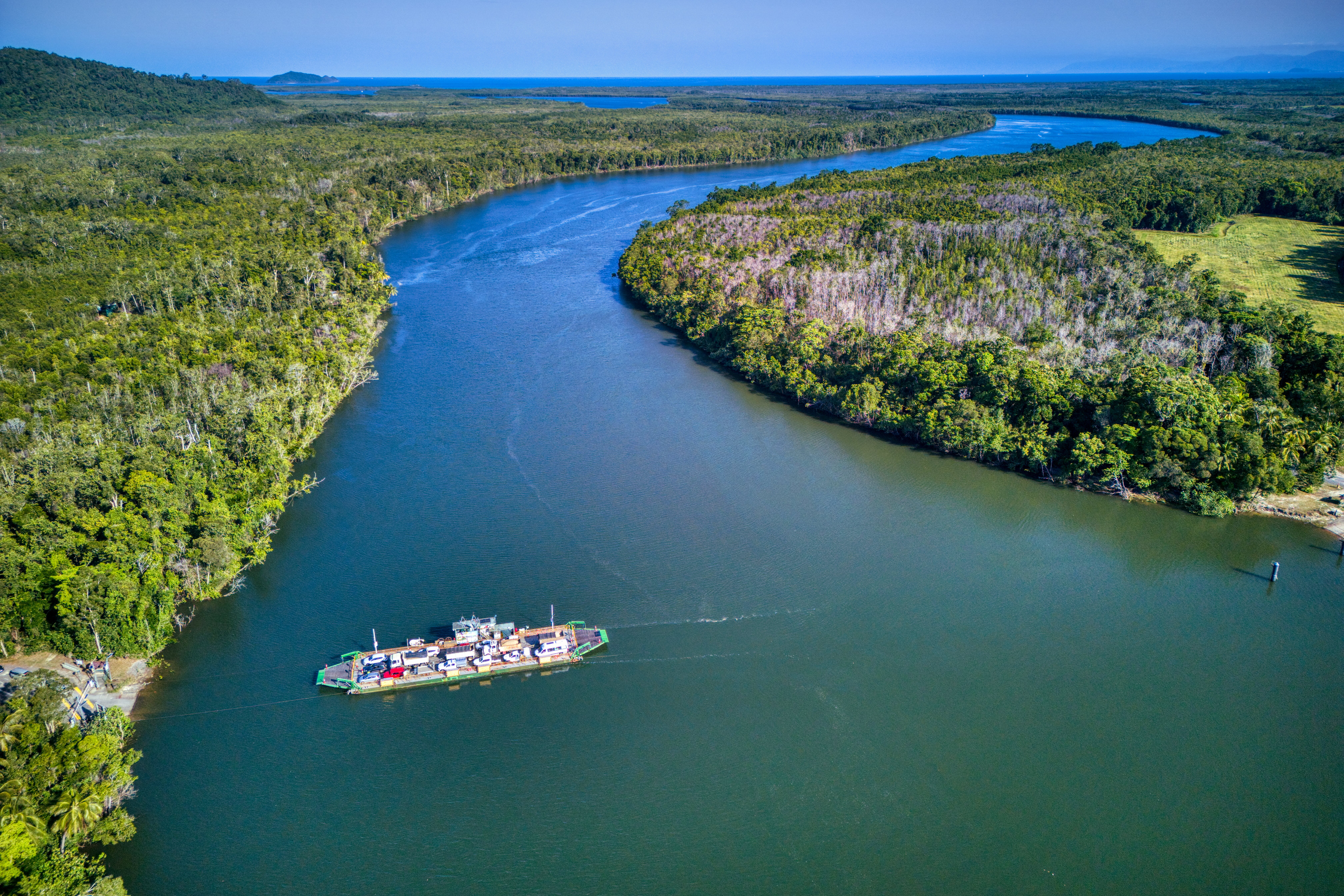
Daintree River Ferry on the Daintree River

In April 2021 Entrada was awarded a contract to operate the Daintree River Ferry. In December 2023 Greyhound Australia was purchased. In July 2024 Entrada took over operation of the Noosa River Ferry.
