= Lake Cootharaba =

Lake in Queensland, Australia

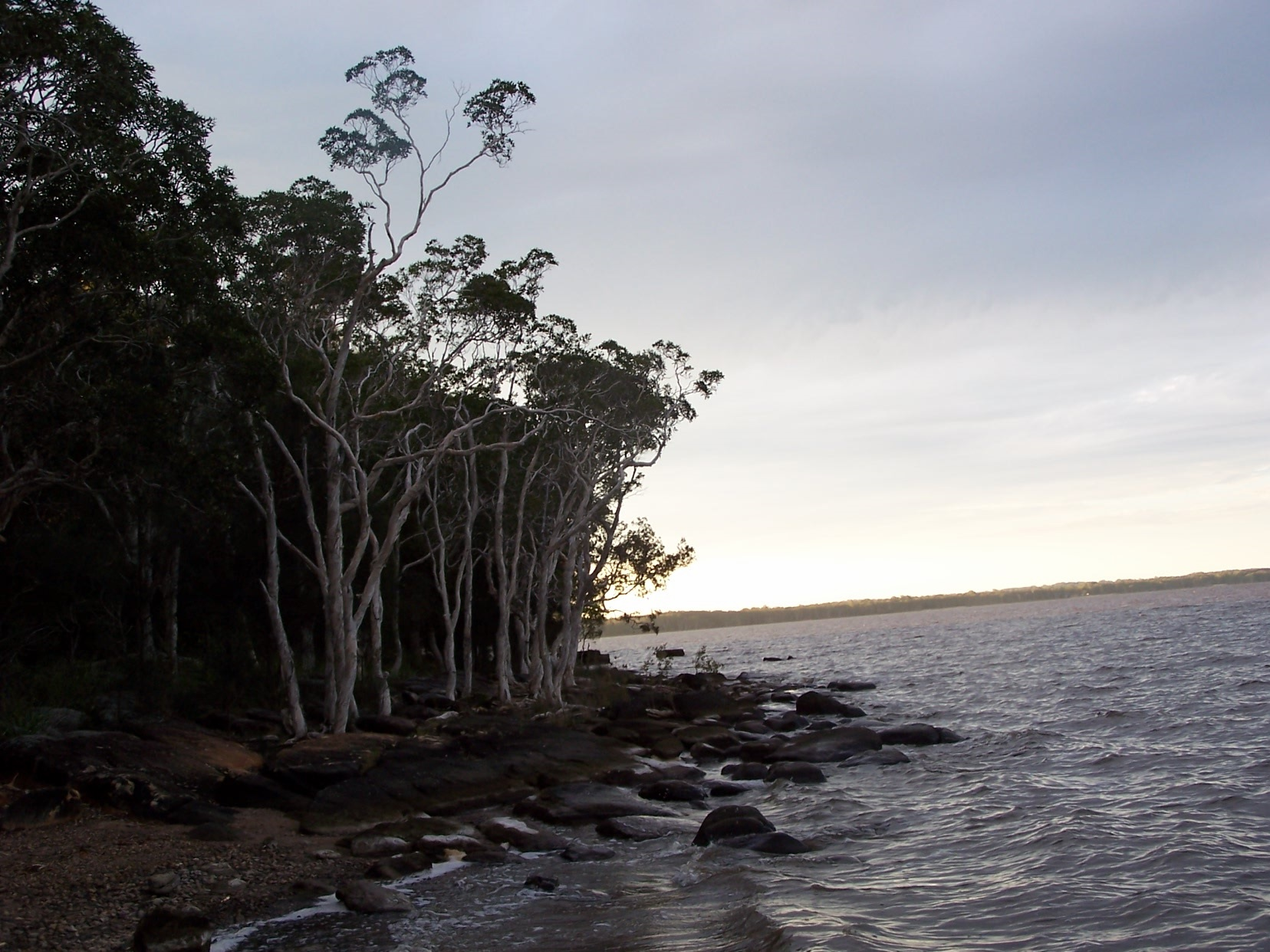

- Location within Queensland
- Location: 15 km (9.3 mi) North West of Noosa, Queensland
- Coordinates: 26.3021°S 152.997°E
- Type: reservoir
- Primary inflows: Noosa River
- Primary outflows: Noosa River
- Basin countries: Australia
- Max. length: 10 km (6.2 mi)
- Average depth: 1.5 m (4 ft 11 in)

Lake Cootharaba is a lake on the Noosa River within the locality of Noosa North Shore in the Shire of Noosa, Queensland, Australia. It is the gateway to the Everglades, a popular tourist attraction for Noosa, being 20 kilometres (12 mi) away from Noosa Heads. The lake's major access is the town of Boreen Point, as well as the smaller camping-spot of Elanda Point.

== Geography ==
Lake Cootharaba is approximately 10 by 5 kilometres (6.2 by 3.1 mi), at an average depth of 1.5 metres (4 ft 11 in). The lake is close to the Pacific Ocean but does not drain directly into it. Instead the Noosa River enters from the north via the Everglades Wetlands and exits at the south via a navigable channel to meet the sea at Noosa Heads 12 kilometres (7.5 mi) to the southeast. The lake is surrounded by the southern section of the Great Sandy National Park to the north, east and south with farming land to the west.

To the west of the lake are the locations of Como, Boreen Point and Cootharaba with the locality of Ringtail Creek to the south-west. To the east and south of the lake is Noosa North Shore.

== History ==
Around 1869, a sawmill began operation at Elandra Point and a company town developed around it. Today the Mill Point Settlement Site is a heritage-listed archeological site.

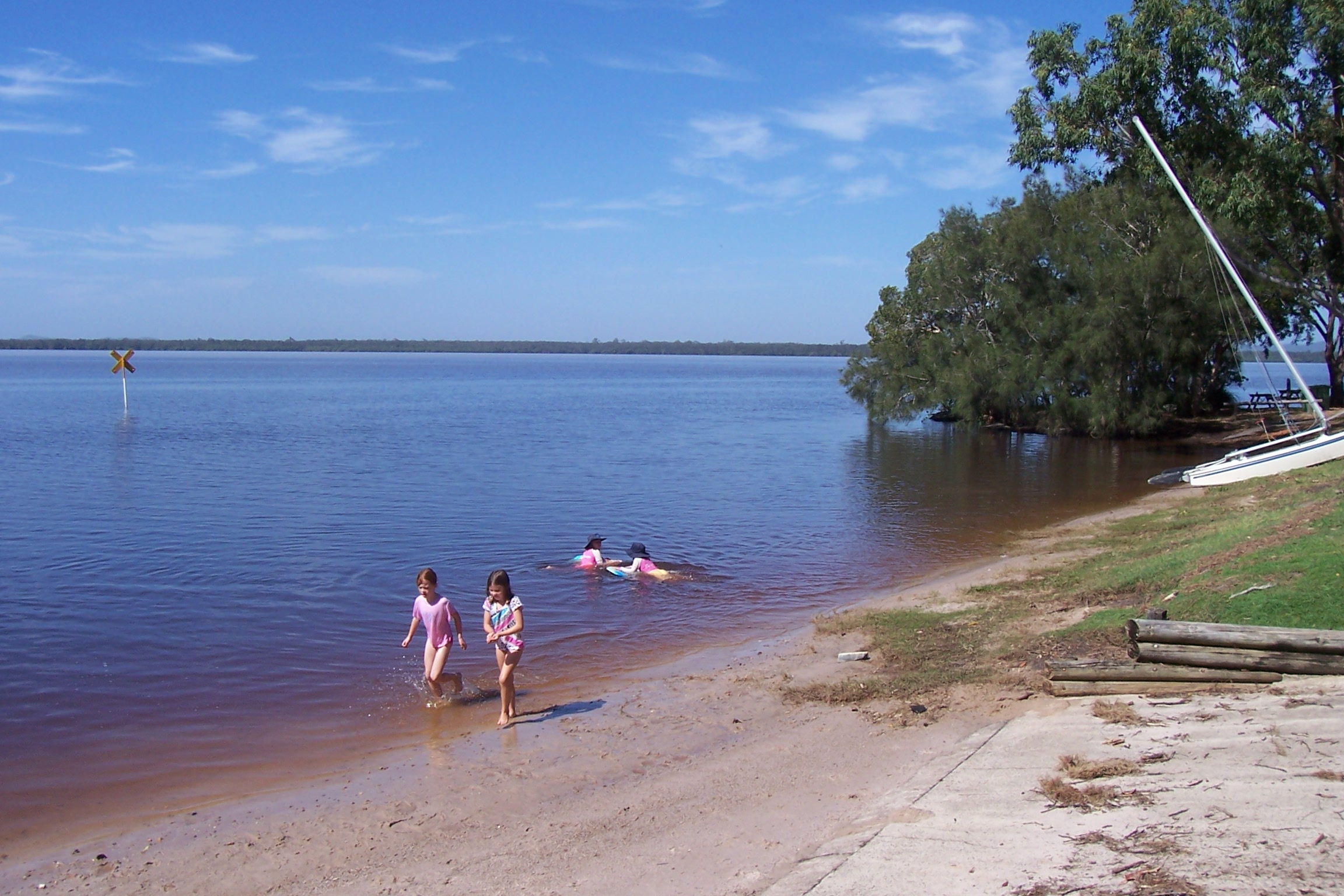
Main Beach, Boreen Point (Note dark tannin discolouration of the water).

== Attractions ==
The lake is a popular location spot for fishing, sailing, canoeing and other water sports. A number of regattas are held on the lake annually and Boreen Point is home to the Lake Cootharaba Sailing Club.

== Settlements ==
Boreen Point is sited on a raised point of land overlooking the western shores of the lake. The village comprises approximately 150 dwellings in a grid system with several hundred additional dwellings on large blocks of land and small farms in the surrounding area. There are several art galleries, lakeside beaches and parkland and the historic Apollonian Hotel. The Shire of Noosa Council operates a popular camping ground on the lake shore on the southern side of the village. A feature of the camping ground is a sandy beach with shallow water that is a popular swimming spot for families and launching point for sailors.

== See also ==
- List of lakes of Australia
- List of tramways in Queensland
