= Great Sandy National Park =

National park in Queensland, Australia

- IUCN category II (national park)
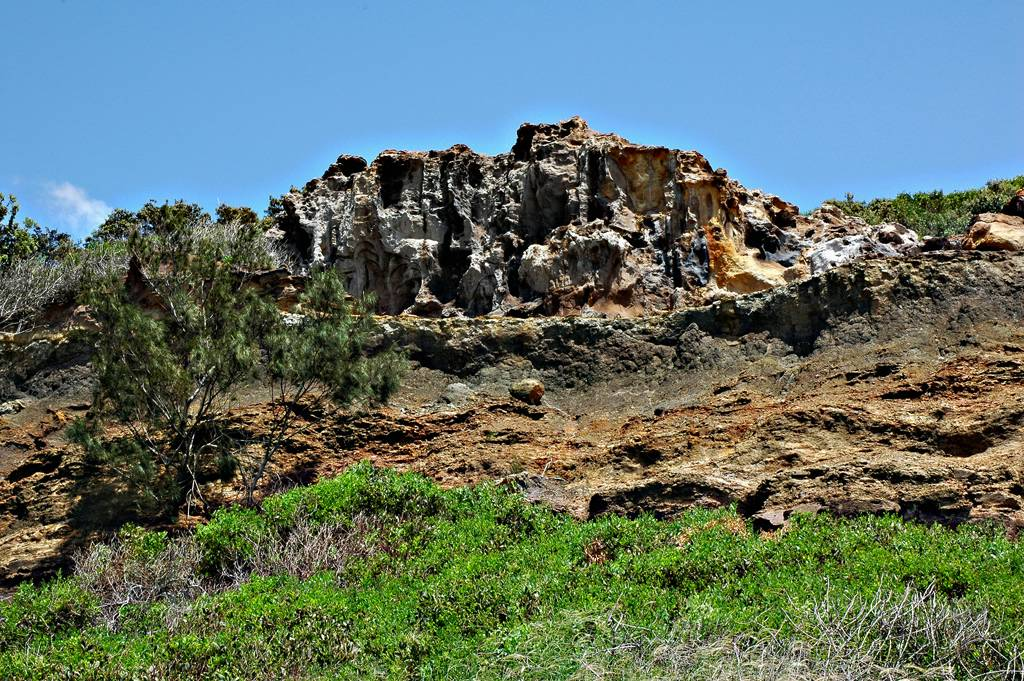
- The Cathedral coloured sands

- Location within Queensland
- Location: Queensland
- Nearest city: Hervey Bay
- Coordinates: 25°02′43″S 153°12′36″E
- Area: 2,195.55 km^{2} (847.71 sq mi)
- Established: 1971
- Visitors: 1,118,000 (in 2012)
- Governing body: Queensland Parks and Wildlife Service

Great Sandy National Park is a coastal national park in the Fraser Coast Region, Queensland, Australia.

== Geography ==
The park features untouched beaches, large sand dunes, heathlands, rainforests, swamps, creeks, freshwater lakes and mangrove forests.

Great Sandy National Park is divided into two sections. The Cooloola Recreation Area section is situated on the coast between Noosa Heads in the south and Rainbow Beach in the north and covers 184,000 hectares (450,000 acres). The K'Gari section (formerly known as Fraser Island) encompasses almost all of the world's largest sand island, which is situated north of Rainbow Beach, covering 56,000 hectares (140,000 acres).

== Environment ==
=== Birds ===
The land within the park is classified by BirdLife International as the Cooloola and Fraser Coast Important Bird Area because it supports a large population of black-breasted buttonquails as well as many bush and beach stone-curlews, green catbirds, regent bowerbirds, mangrove honeyeaters, and pale-yellow robins. Cooloola is also home to the eastern ground parrot and has one of the last coastal populations of the emu.

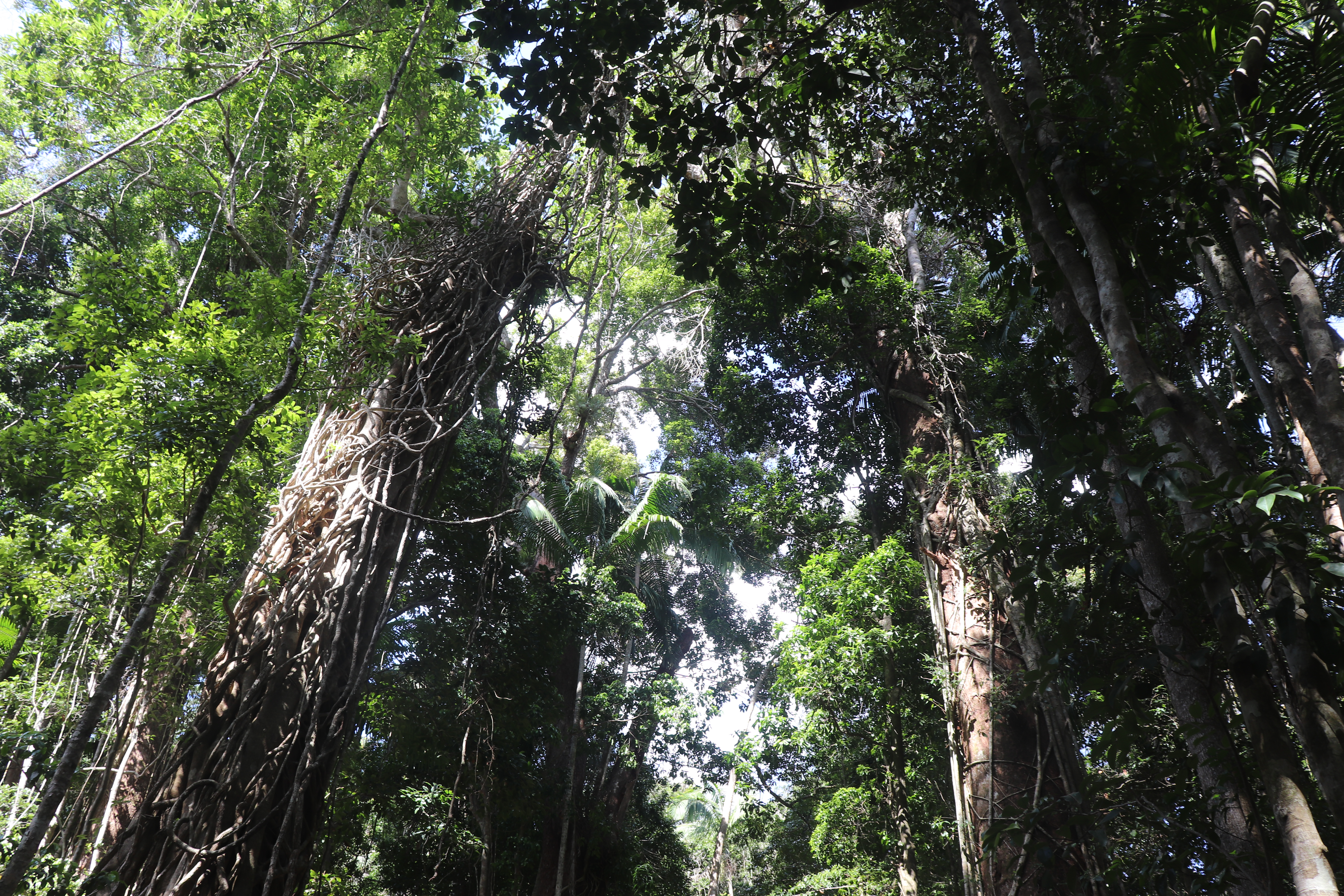
Looking up at a rainforest in the Great Sandy National Park, Cooloola, facing east

== Features ==
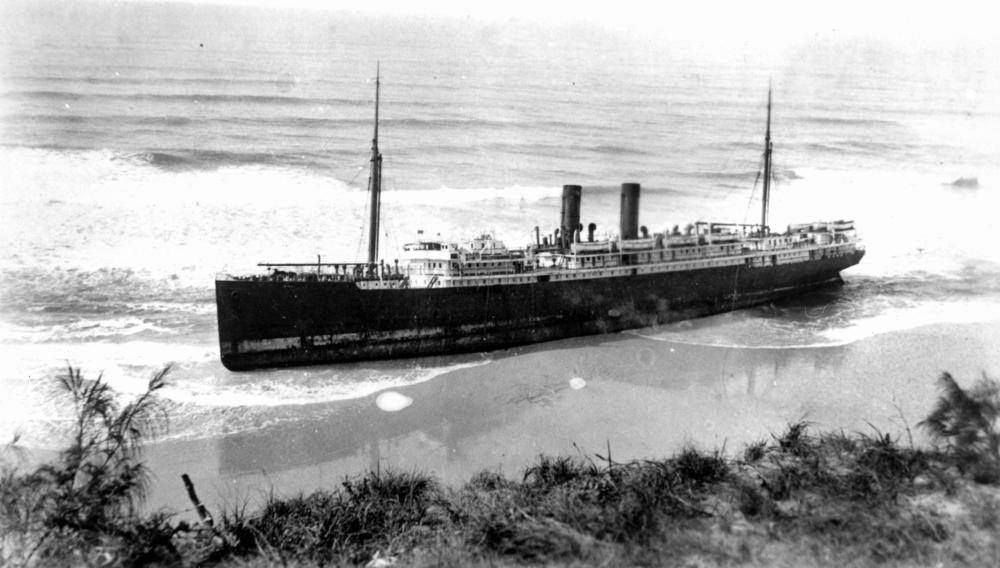
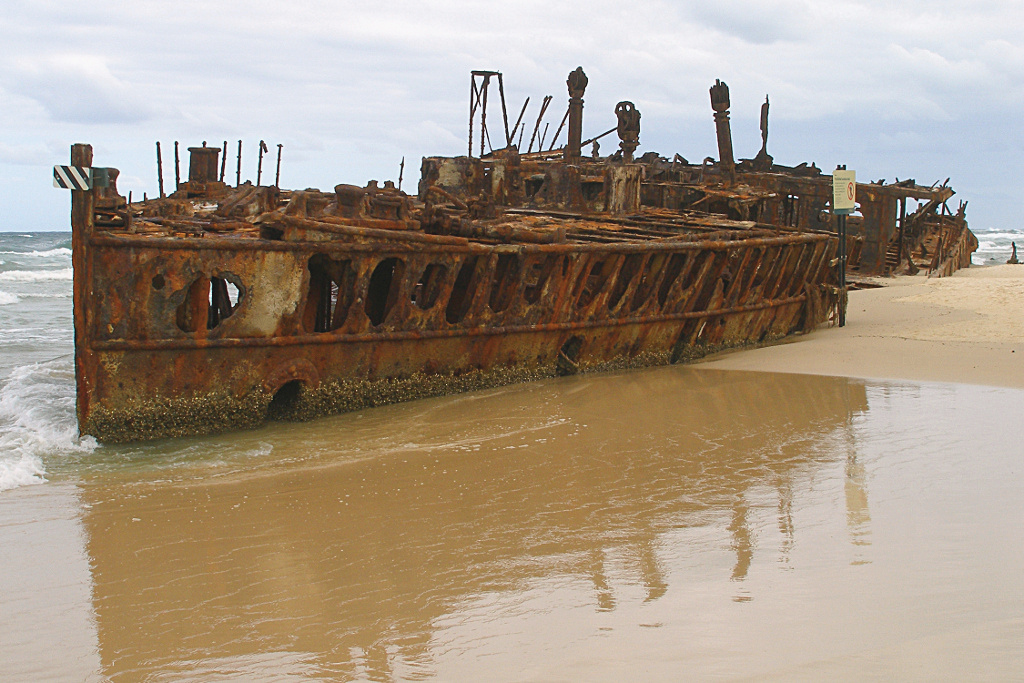
SS Maheno shipwrecked in 1935 and its rusted remains in 2007

The Cooloola section contains the Cooloola Great Walk, a five-day hiking trail. Boat tours and canoeing along the Noosa River are popular visitor activities. On Fraser Island is the 90 km long Fraser Island Great Walk. Lake Cootharaba offers fishing, sailing, and canoeing opportunities.

Whale watching, fishing, four-wheel driving, and bushwalking are also popular. The park also features two shipwrecks; the SS Maheno and the Cherry Venture.

The only place in the world where tall rainforest grows in sand is on K'Gari (formerly known as Fraser Island). The sand island has coloured sand cliffs on its eastern beach and numerous walking tracks from short boardwalks to longer walks, which cross sand blows.

K'Gari also has more than 100 freshwater lakes including the largest perched lake in the world, Lake Boomanjin. Lake Wabby is a popular swimming and fishing spot.

A unique feature of Great Sandy National Park is the coloured sands, which are formed by old sand mixed with clay into a consolidated mass. The visible hues include red, brown, and yellow, which are a reflection of the iron-rich minerals embedded in the sands for thousands of years and brought to the surface by wind and water eroding the land.

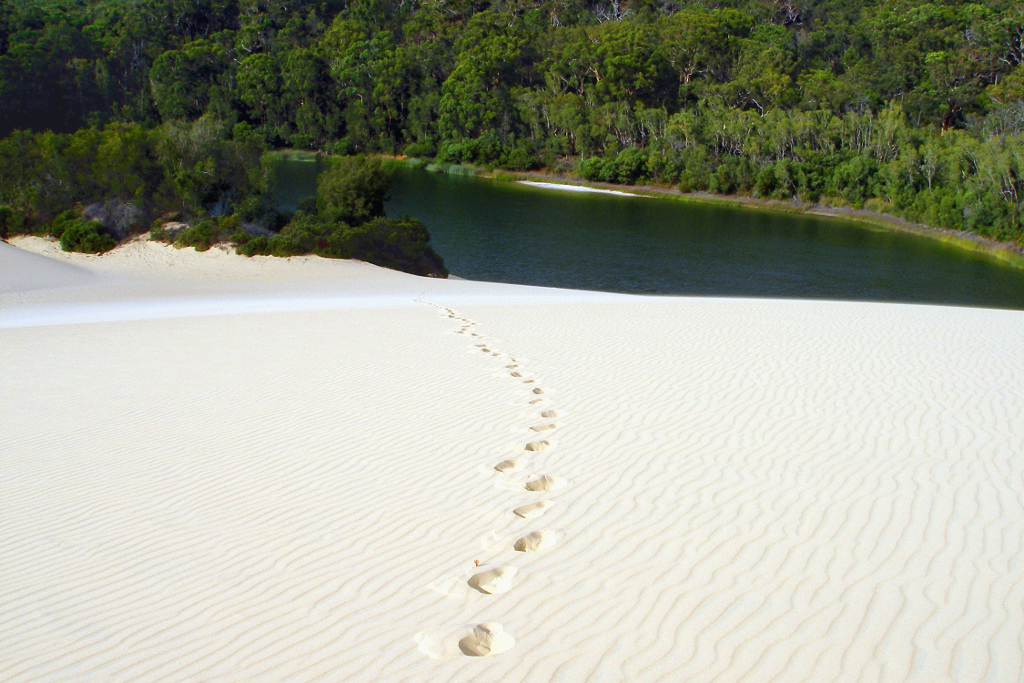
Lake Wabby

== Access ==
Access to Fraser Island ideally requires a high-clearance 4WD vehicle. Parts of the Cooloola section are also inaccessible without a four-wheel drive. Vehicles entering the park need to obtain a vehicle permit for both Fraser Island and the Cooloola Recreational Area. Both sections have numerous camping areas.

=== Camping ===
Permits are required to camp in the park. About 15 camp sites are in the Cooloola section. Only electric motors and non-motorised vessels are permitted past Campsite 3.

=== Fines ===
Fines are issued for feeding Fraser Island's wild dingo population or leaving food or rubbish that may attract them.

== See also ==
- Great Sandy Biosphere Reserve
- Protected areas of Queensland
- Clifford Harry Thompson, geomorphologist, influential Cooloola soils researcher
- List of tramways in Queensland
