= Noosa River =

Coordinates: 26°21′S 153°04′E

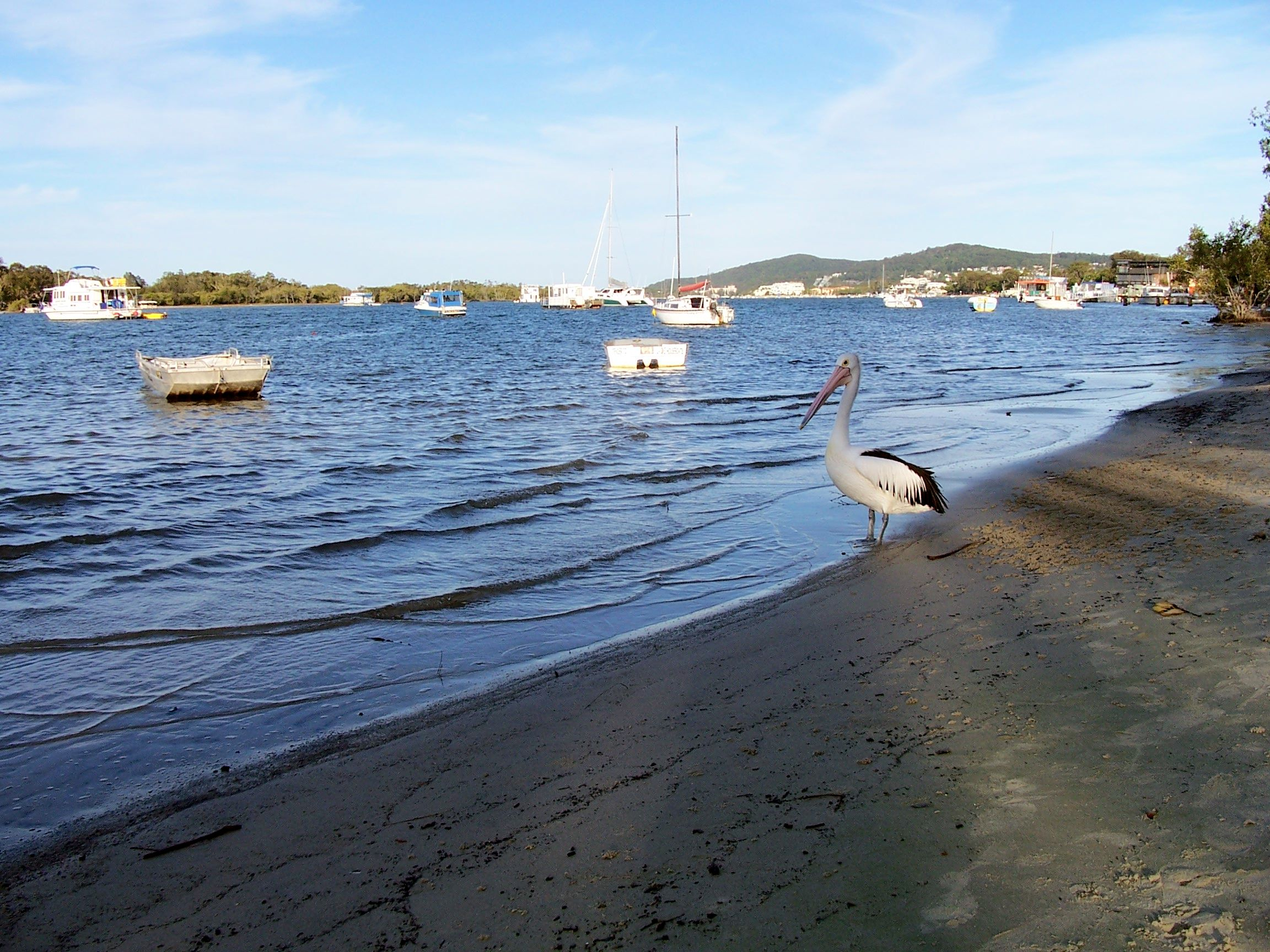

Location
- Country: Australia
- State: Queensland

Physical characteristics
- Source
  - location: Como Escarpment
- Mouth
  - location: Pacific Ocean
- Basin size: 854 km^{2} (330 sq mi)

The Noosa River is a river in South East Queensland. The catchment starts in the Como Escarpment near Mount Elliott in the coastal Great Sandy National Park and meanders south through a lakes district around Tewantin.

Lakes situated on the river include Lake Cooloola, Lake Como, Lake Cootharaba, Lake Cooroibah and Lake Weyba. The catchment is mostly covered by sand dunes and has two major tributaries—Kin Kin Creek and Teewah Creek.

The Noosa River enters the Coral Sea between Noosa Heads and Noosa North Shore. Substantial residential development has encroached into areas previously occupied by the changing river path. The river is noted for its populations of migratory birdlife.

== History ==
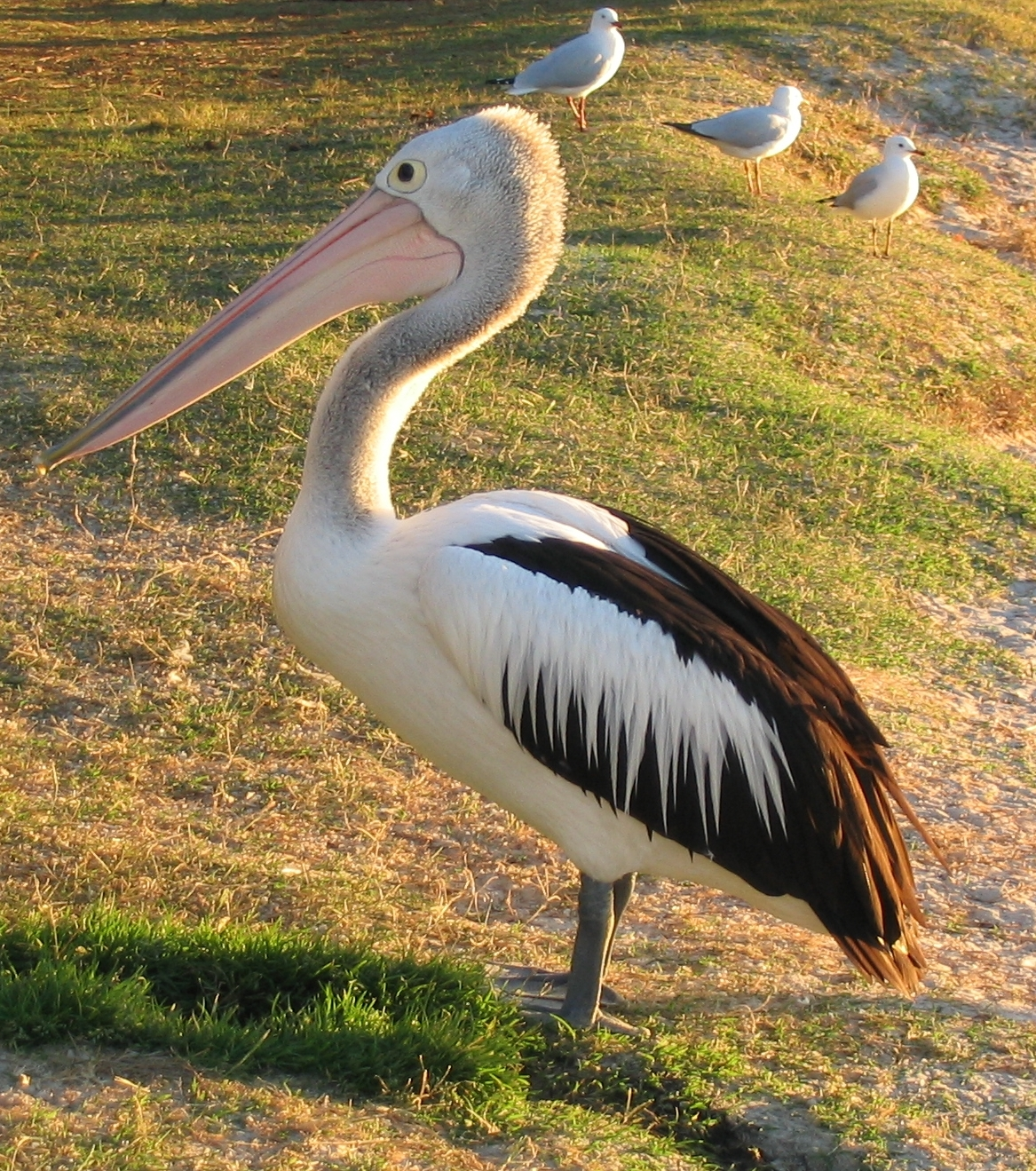
Pelican on the banks of the Noosa River

Logging along the river began in 1864. The logs were transported north to a sawmill near Maryborough until 1870 when a sawmill was built on Lake Cootharaba.

Richard Branson purchased Makepeace Island on the river in May 2003. Noosa Council scaled down his plans for a luxury resort on the river.

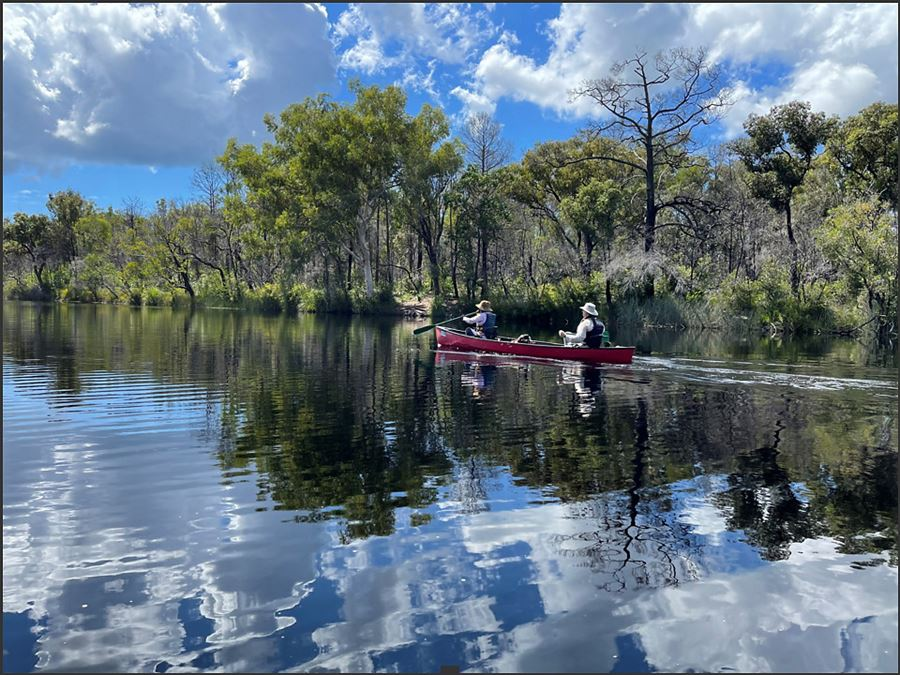
Lazing about on Upper Noosa River in a canoe, 2022

Several kilometres of beach to the north of the mouth were a popular destination for four-wheel driving, until Sunshine Coast Regional Council placed restrictions on them in May 2007.

Chemical contamination has been the suspected cause of a fish mutation resulting in two-headed fish larvae found in the Noosa River. Government investigations into the problem began in 2007. A final scientific report into the cause of the spawning was delayed in 2010 because of the potential to prejudice ongoing civil court proceedings involving the hatchery and a nearby macadamia nut farm.

Until the 1960s the Noosa beach and river entrance were in a state of dynamic equilibrium. The beach was wide and usable and it recovered quickly from the occasional extreme storm events such as cyclones. From the mid-1960s rapid development on the beachfront including building a rockwall along the beach created instability. The beach became narrow and often non existent at high tide. At this time the river entered the sea at the present day Noosa Woods. In 1978 a training wall was built to relocate the river entrance to the northwest where it is today.

== Attractions ==
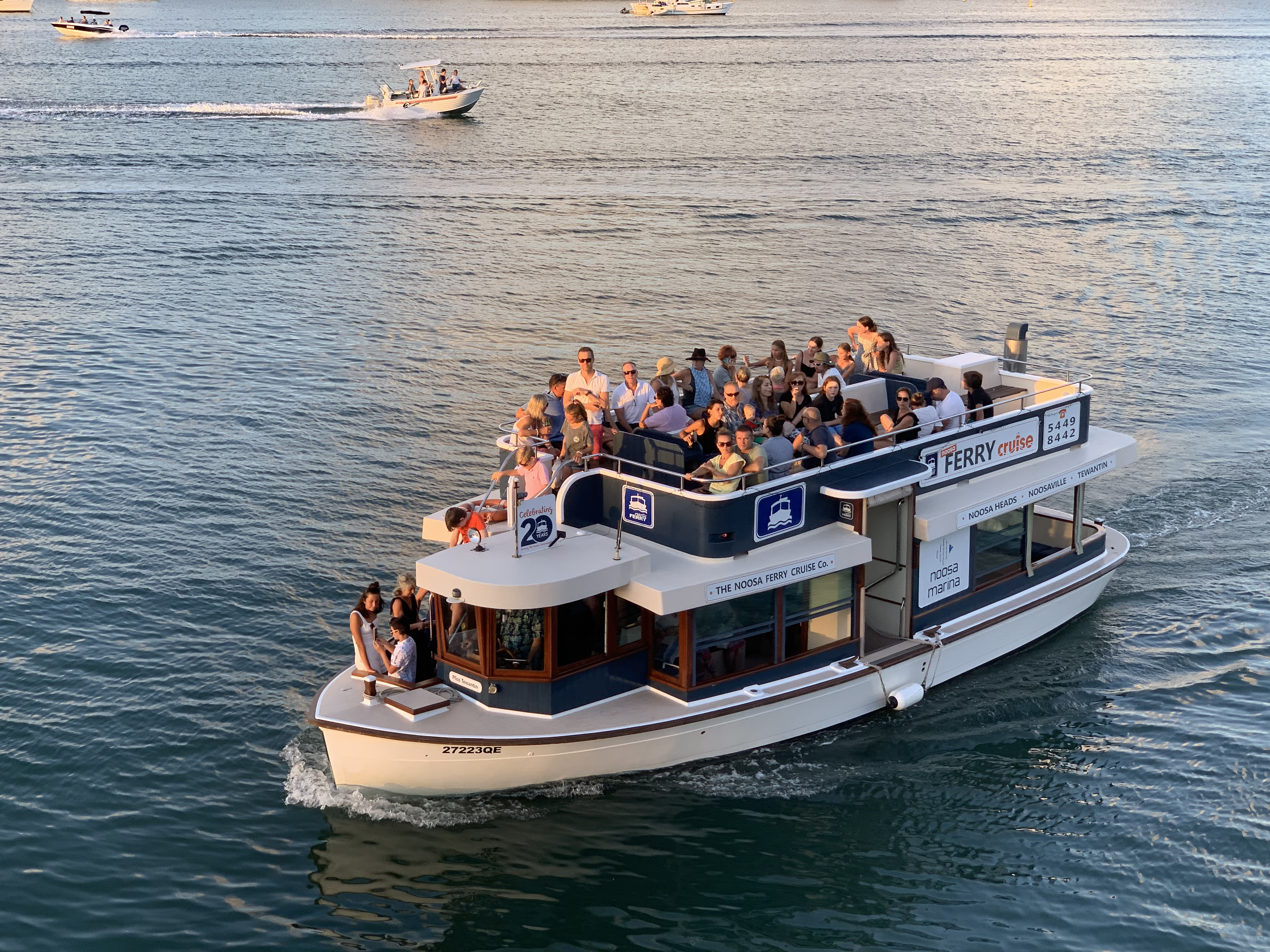
The Noosa River Ferry approaching Noosaville, 2019

The Noosa Ferry operates along the Noosa River from Noosa Heads via Noosaville to Tewantin with timetabled regular services and tourist cruises.

Noosa River & Canal Cruises offers tourist cruises on the Noosa River and its canals departing Noosaville and Noosa Heads.

== See also ==
- List of rivers of Australia
- Noosa River Ferry
- Great Sandy National Park
