= Cooroy–Gympie Road =

Road route in Queensland, Australia

Cooroy–Gympie Road Old Bruce Highway Queensland

General information
- Type: Road
- Length: 29.1 km (18 mi)
- Route number(s): No shield

Major junctions
- Southeast end: Cooroy Connection Road, and Bruce Highway, Black Mountain
- Pomona Connection Road; Kenilworth–Skyring Creek Road; Mary Valley Link Road; Traveston Road
- Northwest end: Bruce Highway, Kybong

Location(s)
- Major suburbs: Federal, Coles Creek, Traveston

Cooroy–Gympie Road is a continuous 29.1 kilometres (18.1 mi) road route in the Noosa and Gympie regions of Queensland, Australia. It is a state-controlled district road (number 914). Known as Old Bruce Highway, It runs from Cooroy Connection Road on the Black Mountain / Pomona midpoint to the Bruce Highway in Kybong. This road provides access to several localities bypassed by the current alignment of the highway.

== Route description ==
Starting at an intersection with Cooroy Connection Road and the Bruce Highway on the Black Mountain / Pomona midpoint, the road initially runs west on the northern side of the highway, between Black Mountain and Pomona, as Old Bruce Highway. In this segment it passes the exit to Black Mountain Range Road to the south via a bridge over the highway, and the exit to Pioneer Road, one of the access roads to the town of Pomona, to the northeast. It then runs between Pomona and Federal, passing the exit to Pomona Connection Road to the northeast.

Continuing generally west and then northwest through Federal the road travels under the Bruce Highway where a northbound exit from the highway joins it. In this segment it passes the exits to several local roads. It next runs through the northeast corner of Tuchekoi where it passes the exit to Kenilworth–Skyring Creek Road to the southwest. After running northwest through Coles Creek the road enters the southwest corner of Cooran and passes the exit to Coles Creek Road to the northeast, and the exits to several local roads, before reaching an intersection on the Traveston boundary. Here it intersects with Mary Valley Link Road and has access to the Bruce Highway and Traveston Road.

From Traveston the road continues generally north through Kybong, passing the exit to Traveston Crossing Road to the southwest. It passes exits to more local roads and Gympie Airport before rejoining the Bruce Highway at a multi-lane intersection.

== History ==
The northern section of this road was part of the Bruce Highway until November 2017 when Section C of the Cooroy to Curra upgrade (Traveston to Woondum) was opened to traffic. The southern section was replaced by a new highway alignment in late 2012.

This road is notable for its high accident rate when it was a highway. An article titled "The old Bruce Highway is a ghost highway drive" in the "Gympie Times" of 1 January 2014 states:

Driving along the old Bruce Highway between Federal and Traveston Crossing is an odd and almost spooky experience. A lot of people have died here, and many thousands more have been seriously injured or permanently maimed.

When this road was still part of the Bruce Highway a report into multiple accidents in the locality of Federal was prepared, containing 69 recommendations to address the perceived causes of these accidents. By March 2010 all but 7 of these recommendations had been completed.

== Major intersections ==
All distances are from Google Maps. The road is within the Noosa and Gympie local government areas.

LGA	Location	km	mi	Destinations	Notes
Noosa	Black Mountain, Pomona midpoint	0	0.0	Bruce Highway – west – Federal, Gympie – southeast – Cooroy, Eumundi; Cooroy Connection Road – east – Cooroy	Southeast end of Cooroy–Gympie Road (Old Bruce Highway)
Noosa	Black Mountain, Pomona midpoint	1.4	0.87	Black Mountain Range Road – south – Black Mountain	Road continues west
Noosa	Black Mountain, Pomona midpoint	1.9	1.2	Pioneer Road – northeast – Pomona	Road continues west
Noosa	Pomona, Federal midpoint	3.4	2.1	Pomona Connection Road – northeast – Pomona	Road continues west
Noosa	Federal	7.8	4.8	Bruce Highway – northwest – Tuchekoi, Gympie – east – Cooroy	Entry from Bruce Highway northbound only. Road turns northwest.
Gympie	Tuchekoi	12.4	7.7	Kenilworth–Skyring Creek Road – southwest – Belli Park	Road continues northwest
Gympie	Cooran	13.2	8.2	Coles Creek Road – northeast – Cooran	Road continues northwest
Gympie	Coles Creek, Traveston midpoint	17.2	10.7	Mary Valley Link Road – southwest – Amamoor northeast – Bruce Highway interchange, Traveston Road – Traveston	Road continues north
Gympie	Kybong	19.9	12.4	Traveston Crossing Road – southwest – Amamoor	Road continues northwest
Gympie	Kybong	29.1	18.1	Bruce Highway (A1) – northwest – Gympie – southeast (M1) – Federal, Cooroy	Northwest end of Cooroy–Gympie Road. No entry to Bruce Highway southbound.
1.000 mi = 1.609 km; 1.000 km = 0.621 mi: Incomplete access

== See also ==
- List of numbered roads in Queensland
