= Eumundi–Noosa Road =

Road in Queensland, Australia

Eumundi–Noosa Road Queensland

General information
- Type: Road
- Length: 15.8 km (9.8 mi)
- Route number(s): State Route 12 (Eumundi to Noosaville); State Route 6 (in Noosaville)

Major junctions
- South-west end: Bruce Highway, Eumundi–Kenilworth Road, and Bunya Road, Eumundi
- Memorial Drive; Caplick Way; Emu Mountain Road; Beckmans Road; Eenie Creek Road; Walter Hay Drive
- North-east end: Goodchap Street and Eumundi Road, Noosaville

Location(s)
- Major suburbs: Verrierdale, Doonan

Eumundi–Noosa Road is a continuous 15.8-kilometre (9.8 mi) road route in the Sunshine Coast and Noosa local government areas of Queensland, Australia. It is signed as State Route 12 for most of its length. For a short distance in Noosaville it is part of State Route 6. It is a state-controlled regional road (number 140) for most of its length. Part of it is rated as a local road of regional significance (LRRS).

== Route description ==
The road starts at an intersection with the Bruce Highway, Bunya Road, and Eumundi–Kenilworth Road in the locality of Eumundi. It runs north-east for a short distance as Memorial Drive before reaching a roundabout intersection where Memorial Drive turns to the north-west. From there the name changes to Eumundi–Noosa Road as it turns north through Eumundi. When it reaches a roundabout intersection with Caplick Way to the north-west, it turns east until it reaches the western boundary of the locality of Verrierdale. The road turns north-east as it crosses the north-west corner of Verrierdale and enters Doonan.

Continuing generally north-east the road crosses the southern (Sunshine Coast) section of Doonan and reaches the regional boundary at the southern entry to a roundabout intersection with Emu Mountain Road to the east. It continues north through the northern (Noosa) section of Doonan, and north-east, running along the boundary between Tewantin and Noosaville, before crossing Eenie Creek where the road changes from state-controlled to council responsibility. Reaching a roundabout intersection with Beckmans Road to the west, Eumundi–Noosa Road continues east in Noosaville as State Route 6. The road continues east and north-east, reaching a roundabout intersection with Eenie Creek Road to the south-east, which carries the State Route 6 shield. From there it runs north-east with no shield, passing a roundabout intersection with Walter Hay Drive to the south-east, until it reaches an intersection with Goodchap Street and Eumundi Road, where it ends.

From Goodchap Street a series of roads and streets carry traffic through Noosaville to Noosa Heads, a further 5.6 kilometres (3.5 mi), ending at a roundabout intersection of Noosa Drive, Sunshine Beach Road and Grant Street. These streets are: Eumundi Road, Gibson Road, Saltwater Avenue, Mary Street, Weyba Road, and Noosa Drive.

The road is fully sealed to at least a two lane standard. Most of this road is part of the shortest route to Noosa Heads from Nambour and all points south or west of Nambour.

A planning study to determine potential improvements to this road was completed in 2019.

== History ==
From the early 1850s the Eumundi district was occupied by three cattle stations, one of which included parts of Verrierdale and Doonan. Timber felling occurred on the steep slopes in the vicinity, with sawmills conveniently located. In 1900 one of these mills moved to Eumundi. Closer settlement began in 1879. Eumundi railway station was opened in 1891. The Bruce Highway passed through the town until 1994.

In 1869 Tewantin was a timber town and the river port for the Noosa district.

In the 1800s, Noosa Heads was a centre for the timber and milling industries. In the late 1920s a tourism industry developed, with cafes and tourist accommodation being built along the beachfront.

== Intersecting state-controlled roads ==
The following state-controlled roads intersect with this road:

- Eumundi–Kenilworth Road
- Emu Mountain Road

=== Eumundi–Kenilworth Road ===
Eumundi–Kenilworth Road
- Location: Bruce Highway, Eumundi to Maleny–Kenilworth Road, Kenilworth
- Length: 32 km (20 mi)
- Route number: 22

Eumundi–Kenilworth Road is a state-controlled district road (number 484). It leaves the Bruce Highway in the south of Eumundi (as West Eumundi Road) and runs to Kenilworth, a distance of 32 kilometres (20 mi), where it transitions to Maleny–Kenilworth Road. It is part of Tourist Drive 22. It intersects with three state-controlled roads; Kenilworth–Skyring Creek Road, Obi Obi Road, and Kenilworth–Brooloo Road. It also has an exit to the Bruce Highway in Eerwah Vale.

=== Emu Mountain Road ===
Emu Mountain Road
- Location: Eumundi–Noosa Road, Doonan to David Low Way, Peregian Beach
- Length: 10.3 km (6.4 mi)
- Route number: 70

Emu Mountain Road is a state-controlled regional/district road (number 144), part of which is rated as a local road of regional significance (LRRS). It runs from Eumundi–Noosa Road in Doonan to David Low Way in Peregian Beach, a distance of 10.3 kilometres (6.4 mi). Part of it is signed as State Route 70. It intersects with Walter Hay Drive and Sunshine Motorway, both part of State Route 70.

== Linked state-controlled roads ==
The following state-controlled roads intersect with Eumundi–Kenilworth Road

- Kenilworth–Skyring Creek Road
- Obi Obi Road
- Kenilworth–Brooloo Road

=== Kenilworth–Skyring Creek Road ===
Kenilworth–Skyring Creek Road
- Location: Eumundi–Kenilworth Road, Belli Park to Cooroy–Gympie Road, Tuchekoi
- Length: 18.5 km (11.5 mi)

Kenilworth–Skyring Creek Road is a state-controlled district road (number 485), rated as a local road of regional significance (LRRS). It runs from Eumundi–Kenilworth Road in Belli Park to Cooroy–Gympie Road (Old Bruce Highway) in Tuchekoi, a distance of 18.5 kilometres (11.5 mi). It intersects with Tuchekoi Road in Tuchekoi.

== Major intersections ==
All distances are from Google Maps.

LGA	Location	km	mi	Destinations	Notes
Sunshine Coast	Eumundi	0	0.0	Bruce Highway – north – Cooroy – south – Yandina; Eumundi–Kenilworth Road (West Eumundi Road) – north to Eerwah Vale, then west – Kenilworth; Bunya Road – south–west – Yandina	South-western end of Eumundi–Noosa Road (Memorial Drive). Road continues north–east as State Route 12.
Sunshine Coast	Eumundi	0.8	0.50	Memorial Drive – north–west – Eumundi	Road continues north as Eumundi–Noosa Road.
Sunshine Coast	Eumundi	2.0	1.2	Caplick Way – north–west – Eumundi	Road continues east.
Noosa	Doonan	10.6	6.6	Emu Mountain Road – east – Weyba Downs	Road continues north.
Noosa	Tewantin / Noosaville midpoint	14.6	9.1	Beckmans Road – west – Tewantin	End of State Route 12. Road continues east as State Route 6.
Noosa	Noosaville	15.3	9.5	Eenie Creek Road – south–east – Doonan	State Route 6 turns south–east. Road continues north-east with no route number.
Noosa	Noosaville	15.6	9.7	Walter Hay Drive – south–east – Noosaville	Road continues north–east.
Noosa	Noosaville	15.8	9.8	Goodchap Street – north–west – Tewantin; Eumundi Road – north–east – Noosaville, Noosa Heads	North-eastern end of Eumundi–Noosa Road. Traffic for Noosa Heads continues north-east on Eumundi Road.
1.000 mi = 1.609 km; 1.000 km = 0.621 mi: Route transition

== See also ==
- List of numbered roads in Queensland
