= Carters Ridge, Queensland =

Carters Ridge
- Suburb
- Interactive map of Carters Ridge
- Coordinates: 26.4525°S 152.7713°E
- Country: Australia
- State: Queensland
- LGA: Gympie Region
- Location: 18.2 km (11.3 mi) WSW of Cooroy; 35.7 km (22.2 mi) S of Gympie; 142 km (88 mi) N of Brisbane

Government
  - State electorate: Gympie
  - Federal division: Wide Bay

Area
  - Total: 14.8 km^{2} (5.7 sq mi)

Population
  - Total: 497 (2021 census)
  - Density: 33.58/km^{2} (87.0/sq mi)
- Time zone: UTC+10:00 (AEST)
- Postcode: 4563
Suburbs around Carters Ridge
Bollier	Tuchekoi	Ridgewood
Bollier	Carters Ridge	Ridgewood
Bollier	Belli Park	Belli Park

Carters Ridge is a rural locality in the Gympie Region, Queensland, Australia. In the 2021 census, Carters Ridge had a population of 497 people.

== Geography ==
The Mary River forms the western boundary.

The land use is an equal mixture of rural residential and grazing on a mixture of native vegetation and irrigated pastures.

== History ==
Carter's Ridge Provisional School opened in May 1925. In 1930, it became Carter's Ridge State School. It closed in 1967. It was at 894 Kenilworth Skyring Creek Road (26.4485°S 152.7657°E).

== Demographics ==
In the 2016 census, Carters Ridge had a population of 469 people.

In the 2021 census, Carters Ridge had a population of 497 people.

== Education ==
There are no schools in Carters Ridge. The nearest government primary schools are Federal State School in Federal to the north and Cooroy State School in Cooroy to the north-east. The nearest government secondary schools are Mary Valley State College (to Year 10 only) in Imbil to the west and Noosa District State High School, which has its Years 7 & 8 campus in Pomona and its Years 9 to 12 campus in Cooroy.

== Amenities ==
Mary Fereday Park is in Poulsen Road (26.4503°S 152.7654°E).
