= Cooroy Lower Mill Site Kiln =

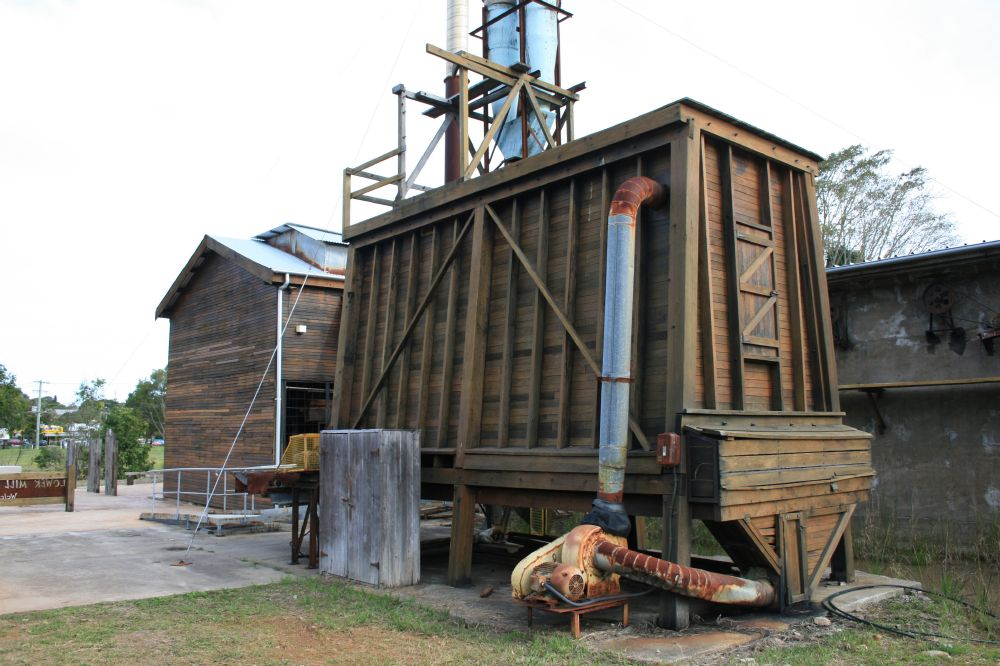
- Cooroy Lower Mill Site Kiln, 2009

- Location within Queensland Location within Australia
- 26.4142°S 152.9096°E
- Location: Lower Mill Road, Cooroy, Shire of Noosa, Queensland, Australia

History
- Built: 1950s

Queensland Heritage Register
- Official name: Cooroy Lower Mill Site Kiln
- Type: state heritage (built)
- Designated: 11 December 2008
- Reference no.: 602688
- Significant period: 1950s
- Significant components: chimney/chimney stack, machinery/plant/equipment – forestry/timber industry, drying kiln, boiler room/boiler house

Cooroy Lower Mill Site Kiln is a heritage-listed kiln at Lower Mill Road, Cooroy, Shire of Noosa, Queensland, Australia. It was built in 1950s. It was added to the Queensland Heritage Register on 11 December 2008.

== History ==
The Cooroy Lower Mill Site Kiln, located in the Sunshine Coast township of Cooroy, was a timber drying kiln built in late 1956 by the prominent South Queensland sawmillers, J Wilkinson and Sons Pty Ltd and Straker and Sons Pty Ltd.

South Queensland produced the largest amount of timber in the State by the middle of the 20th century: in the North Coast (now Sunshine Coast) region, timber was one of the most important industries in the 1950s. As late as the 1980s, a hardwood mill operating at Nandroya near Cooroy was claimed to be the largest in Queensland.

The kiln at Cooroy was the product of a post-World War II trend in the sawmill industry towards centralisation and larger operations to enable economies of scale. One of the motivations for this trend was the need to acquire technology like drying kilns in order to remain competitive. The amalgamation of sawmills made greater funds available for this equipment. Improvements in road transport, which enabled timber to be transported from a wider area, made the trend towards bigger centralised operations feasible.

By 1956, Straker and Sons and J Wilkinson and Sons already owned several milling operations on the North Coast. The Strakers owned the Cooroy Sawmilling Company located next to the kiln together with mills at Cooran and Gympie. J Wilkinson and Sons owned sawmills at Yandina and Conondale. The two organisations partially merged in 1956 to form Kiln Dried Timbers Pty Ltd, the company that operated the kiln and an adjoining planing mill (no longer extant). The kiln enabled the partners to accelerate the process of seasoning hardwood from their mills including flooring and chamferboard and to expand their market to include far western Queensland, Sydney and Melbourne. These markets demanded lower moisture content than could be achieved by air drying. The kiln was claimed to be the first built on the North Coast.

As built in 1956, the kiln comprised a steam heated, cross shaft internal fan design that was common in Australia at the time. The design was obtained by the company from CSIRO. It consisted of four double chambers 64 by 48 feet (20 by 15 m) each with a height of 13 feet (4.0 m) and a capacity of 9000 super feet. They were fabricated from concrete. Carefully stacked timber was transferred into the kiln using trolleys on rails. Heat was generated by a 100 horsepower (75 kW) boiler and transferred to the kiln chambers by a series of tubes. Hot air radiating from the tubes was circulated in the chambers by internal electric fans. The temperature in the kiln was designed to reach around 120 °F (49 °C).

The boiler was fuelled by waste from the adjacent sawmill via a hopper and chutes (all extant). As well as providing steam for the kiln, the boiler powered a steam engine and electric generator (extant). Electricity from this was used to power the electrical plant including the fans.

Also extant on the site is a reconditioning chamber adjacent to the kiln. This chamber was used to treat a condition called "collapse" brought about by abnormal and excessive shrinkage. The collapsed timber was steamed in a closed chamber with saturated steam at atmospheric pressure for a period of about six hours. Steam was injected into the chamber via a single perforated steam pipe.

By the 1970s, an increasingly challenging timber industry made it necessary for Strakers and Wilkinsons to undergo a further amalgamation. They were also joined by the Lutton family's sawmilling operation and together they formed North Coast Sawmills Pty Ltd. The new company opened the large hardwood mill at Nandroya. This enabled the use of more efficient modern machinery and logs were sourced from a wider area.

North Coast Sawmills' Cooroy mills were bought by Quintex in the 1980s and subsequently Boral Timber. Boral used the kiln and planing plant to produce and dry boards for flooring and decking. The kiln was closed in the early 2000s under the terms of the Regional Forests Agreement. In 2007, the kiln and adjacent sawmill sites were undergoing redevelopment as a public recreational precinct.

== Description ==
Structures remaining from the drying kiln complex operated by sawmillers Wilkinson and Sons Pty Ltd and Straker and Sons Pty Ltd stand on the Cooroy Lower Mill site in an open grassed paddock to the east of Lower Mill Road on the north side of the town of Cooroy. They are within a larger industrial estate of modern sheds. To the southeast of the kiln complex a grassed track crosses the creek and connects the site back to the former Cooroy Butter Factory now operating as an art gallery and community centre.

The kiln complex consists of a boiler shed with a prominent tall stack, hopper and chutes, control room, reconditioning chamber, a four chamber drying kiln and associated equipment, fixtures and fittings including a steam engine and electric generators in the boiler shed.

=== Drying kiln ===
An in-situ concrete structure with a flat roof, the drying kiln consists of four discrete chambers 19.5 metres (64 ft) long and 4 metres (13 ft) high. Each chamber is open at the north end and accessed by a hatch door from the control room at the south end. Trolley rails run within each chamber between narrow concrete platforms. Fans are fixed to and pipes, ducts and conduits run along the ceilings. Rails for a transfer line run across the north entrances to the chambers. Four sets of twin wheels and belts are fitted to the top third of the exterior west wall beneath the overhanging eaves. A projecting timber walkway with a timber balustrade runs along beside them.

=== Reconditioning chamber ===
A hollow in-situ concrete channel rectangular in section, the reconditioning chamber stands to the east of the drying kiln. Trolley tracks run within the chamber between narrow concrete platforms. The lower third of the north opening is concreted and the south end is sealed with a small opening for the air duct.

=== Control room ===
The control room comprises a narrow corridor running between the boiler shed and the kiln. It is sheltered by a skillion roof off the south side of the kiln chambers, clad with corrugated galvanised iron. The room contains pipes, valves, gauges and other equipment that regulates the functioning of the kiln chambers. Each chamber has a viewing window and hatch door access from the control room.

=== Boiler shed ===
A tall rectangular, single-skin, timber-framed shed clad with chamferboards and sheltered by a gable roof clad with corrugated galvanised iron, the boiler shed is dominated by the boiler. Standing on a concrete slab floor, the metal encased boiler is supported on a brick base. A timber framed and clad chute feeds into the boiler from a hopper in the northeast corner of the shed and an exhaust stack projects from the boiler through the roof. Metal ladders are fixed to the north and south sides of the base of the stack. The tall chimney stack is secured externally with metal ties.

Direct current and alternating current generators stand to the north of the boiler and each has a maker's plate from the English Electric Company Ltd London.

A tall timber framed tank stand stands to the west of the boiler shed. There is no tank.

=== Hopper ===
A rectangular box tapering from base to top, the hopper has an external stud frame and a single skin of weatherboards. Twin fibreglass exhaust ducts project through the flat timber roof. A narrow hinged door opens out on the north side and a metal pipe runs up the northeast corner turning into the hopper near the top. A narrow timber platform to the northwest accommodates a small motor and a set of timber stairs at the southwest end descend from the roof of the hopper to flat roof of the reconditioning chamber. A timber chute runs from the base of the hopper up into the hopper in the boiler shed.

Adjacent to the kiln site East of the kiln site, remnants of a former sawmill lay scattered about including trolleys, rails and concrete plinths. The site is presently used as an open sawmilling area and is not included in the heritage listing.

== Heritage listing ==
Cooroy Lower Mill Site Kiln was listed on the Queensland Heritage Register on 11 December 2008 having satisfied the following criteria.

The place is important in demonstrating the evolution or pattern of Queensland's history.

The Cooroy Lower Mill Site Kiln (1956) is important in demonstrating the development of the State's timber industry insofar that it is a rare example of a timber drying kiln established on the North Coast (now Sunshine Coast) when the region was recognized to be one of the State's most important timber producers.

As the first drying kiln to be built in the region, it demonstrates the trend from the mid-20th Century towards improving efficiency using more scientific methods. As the product of a joint venture between major sawmilling companies, it also demonstrates the trend, at the time, towards centralizing operations to finance shared capital equipment. The drying kiln enabled timber to be seasoned more rapidly and it enabled timber to be sold to markets that demanded lower moisture content than could be achieved by air seasoning.

The place demonstrates rare, uncommon or endangered aspects of Queensland's cultural heritage.

The kiln is the only known example of a timber drying kiln in the Sunshine Coast region and it remains in a highly intact condition. A large number of sawmills and associated facilities were once located in this noted timber producing region. However, owing to economic and environmental factors, intact facilities have become increasingly uncommon since the middle of the 20th century.

The place is important in demonstrating the principal characteristics of a particular class of cultural places.

The kiln is a highly intact example of a steam heated, cross shaft internal fan design. This design was once common in the industry. All of the operating elements of the facility remain intact including the fuel system, boiler, steam engine and electric generator, most of the heating tubes, fans, kiln chambers and reconditioning chamber.

The place is important because of its aesthetic significance.

Dominated by the tall rusting stack of the boiler, the surviving elements of the drying kiln complex are a monumental presence in the landscape. The place has an arresting impact as an industrial ruin – the concrete hulk of the kiln chambers, the rusted galvanised iron and weathered timber, the slowly decaying remnants of machinery, equipment, fixtures and fittings – all combine to evoke a tough industrial aesthetic.
