= Gympie–Brooloo–Kenilworth Road =

Road in Queensland, Australia

Gympie–Brooloo–Kenilworth Road Queensland

General information
- Type: Rural road
- Length: 51.6 km (32 mi)
- Route number(s): State Route 51

Major junctions
- North end: Bruce Highway Gympie
- Mary Valley Link Road; Tuchekoi Road; Yabba Creek Road
- South end: Eumundi–Kenilworth Road Kenilworth

Location(s)
- Major settlements: Dagun, Amamoor, Kandanga, Imbil, Brooloo

Gympie–Brooloo–Kenilworth Road is a continuous 51.6 kilometres (32.1 mi) road route in the Gympie and Sunshine Coast regions of Queensland, Australia. It has two official names, Gympie–Brooloo Road and Kenilworth–Brooloo Road. The entire route is signed as State Route 51.

Gympie–Brooloo Road (number 483) is a state-controlled district road and Kenilworth–Brooloo Road (number 481) is also a state-controlled district road.

Gympie–Brooloo Road is known locally (with Local and State Government approval) as Mary Valley Road.

== Route description ==
The road commences as Gympie–Brooloo Road (Mary Valley Road) at an intersection with the Bruce Highway (A1) in Gympie. It crosses the Mary River and runs generally south, following the Mary River Valley. After running through the eastern corner of the residential locality of Southside the road passes through or by rich farming land in a number of localities. These include Jones Hill, Long Flat, Gilldora and Dagun. It next turns south-east then south through Amamoor. The village of Amamoor is well to the west of the road, on the former railway line. In Amamoor the Mary Valley Link Road branches off to the east. The road continues south through Kandanga and Imbil to Brooloo, the terminus of the former railway line. In Imbil the Tuchekoi Road branches off to the east, and Yabba Creek Road runs to the west.

At Brooloo the road changes to Kenilworth–Brooloo Road, running south and south-east to Kenilworth, where it ends at an intersection with the Eumundi–Kenilworth Road, which branches off to the east. Eumundi–Kenilworth Road continues south as Elizabeth Street, with no route number other than Tourist Drive 22, to an intersection with Charles Street. From there the road (and Tourist Drive 22) continues south as Maleny–Kenilworth Road.

=== Tourist Drive 42 ===
Tourist Drive 42 is concurrent with most of Gympie–Brooloo Road, leaving it at Kandanga to follow Kandanga–Imbil Road to Imbil on its way to Borumba Dam. On returning from the dam it rejoins at Imbil and runs north a short distance before turning south-east to Tuchekoi.

== History ==
Pastoral leases were taken up in the Fraser Coast Region from 1843, and European settlement of what is now Gympie began soon after. The Gympie district was part of the large Widgee Widgee pastoral area. In 1887, 43,000 acres (17,000 ha) of land were resumed from the Widgee Widgee pastoral run for the establishment of small farms. Further south, 21,760 acres (8,810 ha) were resumed from Imbil. The land was offered for selection on 17 April 1887. The opening of new farms on the western side of the Mary River to the south of Gympie led to the development of roads in the Mary Valley.

A pastoral lease was taken up as Kenilworth Station in 1850. The effects of the 1884 Land Act reached the Kenilworth area in 1888, when land on grazing properties was surveyed and made available for selection. Development of small farms in the Imbil and Kenilworth areas led to the need for a road to transport products to Gympie, and also requests for a railway line. The road was completed quickly, but a railway did not arrive until 1914–15. Meanwhile, further road improvements had been undertaken.

== Upgrades ==
A project to design active transport crossings, at a cost of $1.3 million, was to be completed in July 2022.

== Intersecting state-controlled roads ==
This road intersects with the following state-controlled roads:

- Mary Valley Link Road
- Tuchekoi Road
- Yabba Creek Road

=== Mary Valley Link Road ===
Mary Valley Link Road
- Location: Bruce Highway, Traveston to Gympie–Brooloo Road, Amamoor
- Length: 2.7 km (1.7 mi)

Mary Valley Link Road (number 480) is a state-controlled district road rated as a local road of regional significance (LRRS). It runs from the Bruce Highway in Traveston to Gympie–Brooloo Road in Amamoor, a distance of 2.7 kilometres (1.7 mi). This road has no major intersections.

=== Tuchekoi Road ===
Tuchekoi Road
- Location: Gympie–Brooloo Road, Imbil to Kenilworth–Skyring Creek Road, Tuchekoi
- Length: 4.5 km (2.8 mi)

Tuchekoi Road (number 482) is a state-controlled district road rated as a local road of regional significance (LRRS). It runs from Gympie–Brooloo Road in Imbil to Kenilworth–Skyring Creek Road in Tuchekoi, a distance of 4.5 kilometres (2.8 mi). It is part of Tourist Drive 42. This road has no major intersections.

=== Yabba Creek Road ===
Yabba Creek Road
- Location: Gympie–Brooloo Road, Imbil to Borumba Dam, Lake Borumba
- Length: 13.5 km (8.4 mi)

Yabba Creek Road (number 4832) is a state-controlled district road rated as a local road of regional significance (LRRS). It runs from Gympie–Brooloo Road in Imbil to the Borumba Dam in Lake Borumba, a distance of 13.5 kilometres (8.4 mi). It is part of Tourist Drive 42. This road has no major intersections.

== Major intersections ==
All distances are from Google Maps.

LGA	Location	km	mi	Destinations	Notes
Gympie	Gympie	0	0.0	Bruce Highway – south – Kybong, Cooroy north – Gunalda, Tiaro	Northern end of Gympie–Brooloo Road (State Route 51) (Mary Valley Road); Northern concurrency terminus with Tourist Drive 42. Road continues south.
Gympie	Amamoor	17.4	10.8	Mary Valley Link Road – east – Traveston and Bruce Highway	
Gympie	Kandanga	24.2	15.0	Kandanga–Imbil Road – south – Imbil	Southern concurrency terminus with Tourist Drive 42
Gympie	Imbil	30.0	18.6	Tuchekoi Road – southeast, then east – Tuchekoi	Northern concurrency terminus with Tourist Drive 42
Gympie	Imbil	34.5	21.4	Brooloo Road to Yabba Creek Road – northwest, then west – Borumba Dam	Southern concurrency terminus with Tourist Drive 42
Gympie	Brooloo	42.0	26.1	Callemonda Road – southwest – Brooloo village	Name changes to Kenilworth–Brooloo Road. Continues south then southeast.
Sunshine Coast	Kenilworth	51.6	32.1	Eumundi–Kenilworth Road – east, then north-east – Eumundi – south (as Elizabeth Street) – Kenilworth town.	Southern end of Kenilworth–Brooloo Road (State Route 51).
1.000 mi = 1.609 km; 1.000 km = 0.621 mi: Concurrency terminus; Route transition

== See also ==
- List of road routes in Queensland
- List of numbered roads in Queensland
- Widgee
- Mary Valley Railway Cream Sheds § History, for a detailed description of the growth of dairying and other rural industries in the Mary Valley in the late 1800's.
