= Cooroy Post Office =

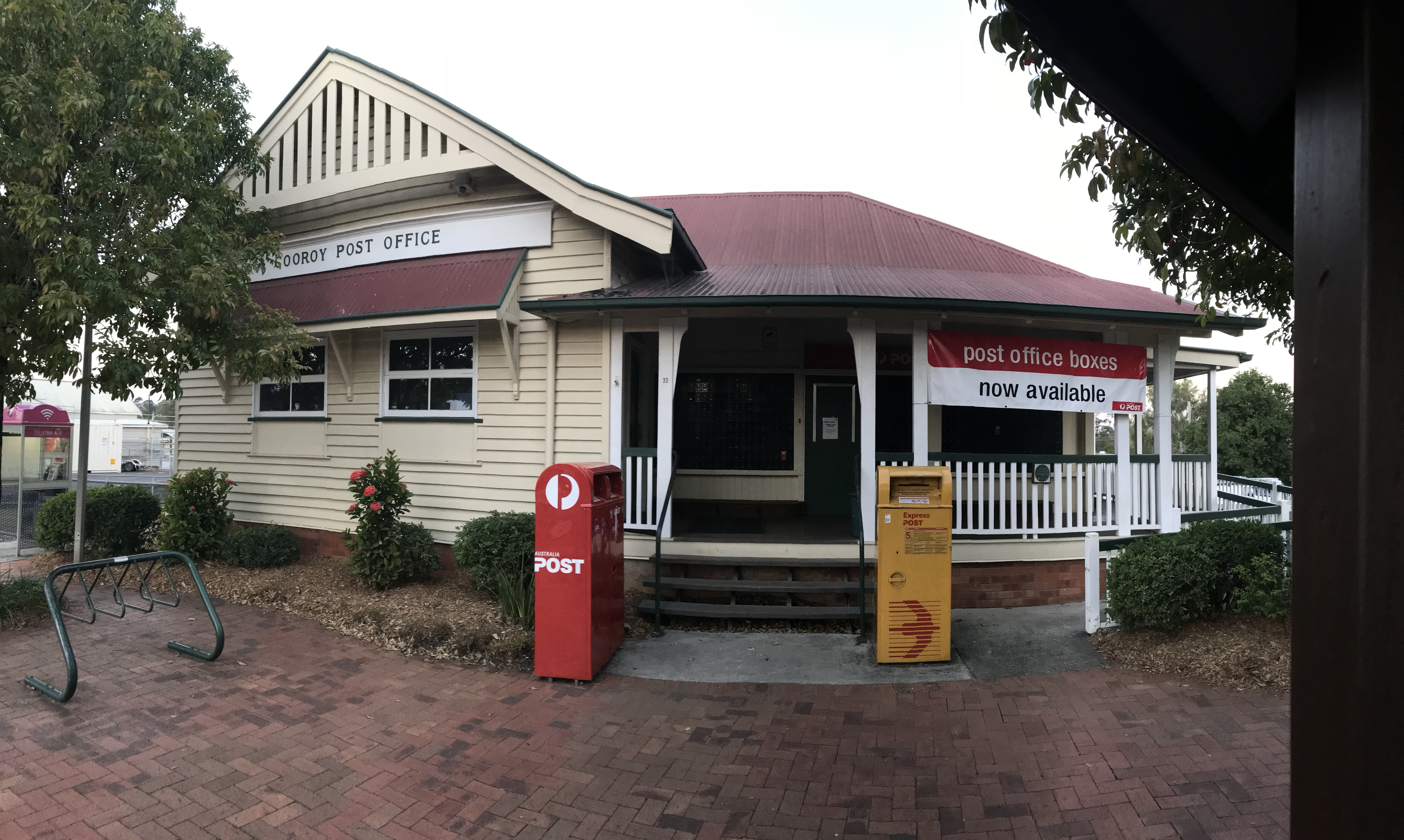
- Cooroy Post Office, 2017

- Location within Queensland
- 26.4184°S 152.9104°E
- Location: 33 Maple Street, Cooroy, Shire of Noosa, Queensland, Australia

History
- Built: 1914
- Built for: Postmaster-General of Australia

Site notes
- Architect: Thomas Pye
- Owner: Australia Post

Commonwealth Heritage List
- Official name: Cooroy Post Office
- Type: Listed place (Historic)
- Designated: 22 August 2012
- Reference no.: 106202
- Builders: L. Baldry

Cooroy Post Office is a heritage-listed post office at 33 Maple Street, Cooroy, Shire of Noosa, Queensland, Australia. It was designed by Thomas Pye and built in 1914 by L. Baldry. It was added to the Australian Commonwealth Heritage List on 22 August 2012.

== History ==
Post and telegraph facilities were available at Cooroy railway station from 1892. The facilities moved from the station to the present site of the Post Office in 1911 when the townspeople and the Australian Government decided to use the building originally built for the chambers of the Noosa Shire Council as a post office. It was leased by the Postmaster-General for this purpose. In October 1911, the Queensland Governor approved the sale of the land to the Australian Government for the purpose of a post and telegraph office at a cost of £162/7/6, with first post master appointed being Mr Campbell. E.G. Chinnery was appointed permanent post master in April 1912. A Morse Code telegraph instrument was installed in the building at the start of September 1912.

The Australian Government called tenders for a new post office to the design of acting Queensland Government Architect, Thomas Pye, in 1913 to be erected alongside the existing building. In January 1914 the contact to erected the new building was awarded to L. Baldry for £531/16/0. Local sawmills supplied the timber. The new post office was ready to open in September 1914, with the building described as "a neat and substantial structure" and the predication that it "should provide ample accommodation for many years to come" (and indeed the post office has been in use of 100 years). In November 1914, a new telephone switchboard was installed, improving the telephone service.

Later works of the 1940s through to the 1960s, included construction of an additional verandah on the southern side of building, and may also have included replacement of original casement sash windows in the front elevation with awning sash windows. Other later works included the addition of a single-storey flat roofed building to the north of the main office area; the sub-floor areas enclosed with cream brick dwarf walls; the rear verandah enclosed to form staff lunch room; and in the 1980s and 1990s refurbishment of the internal office area and upgrade of retail facilities. In 1996 a disabled access ramp and extension to the non-original verandah were installed across the south side of the building; the brick addition on the north side of the building also appears to have been removed by that date.

== Description ==
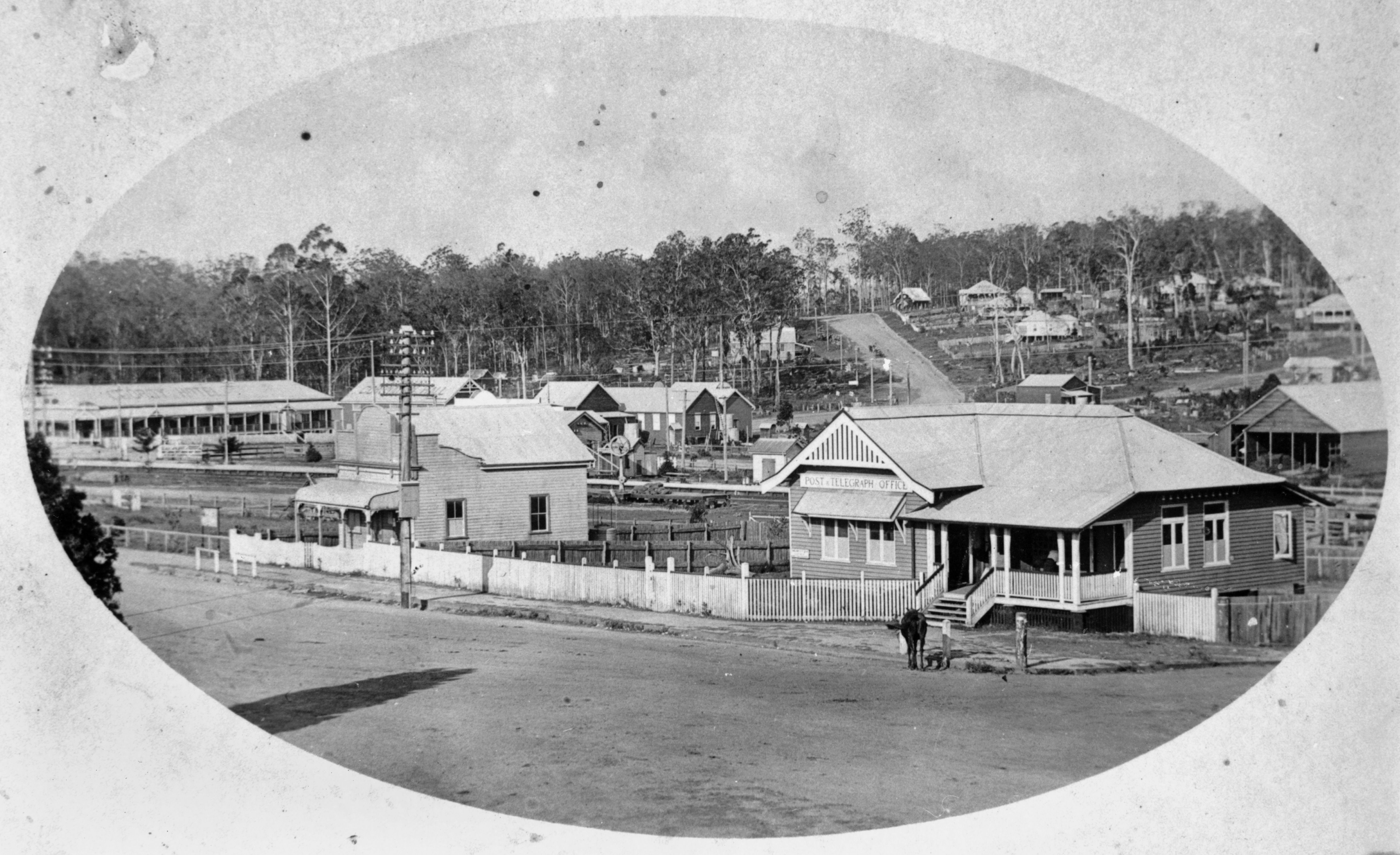
Cooroy Post and Telegraph Office, newly built

Cooroy Post Office is at 33 Maple Street, corner of Garnet Street, Cooroy, comprising the whole of Lot 2 RP147678.

Cooroy Post Office, dating from 1914, is located on a gently sloping, regularly-shaped corner site which is defined on the west by the town's principal commercial and retail street, Maple Street. The original post office building is raised above street level and the frontage addresses Maple Street, though the majority of the private letter box bays and rear access is via the Crystal Street frontage. The elevated corner site also allows for some views of the building "in the round". The street corner of the site is marked by a cast iron pillar posting box marked "JS Engineering Co., Brisbane", added at a later date. The site is enclosed by an early timber post and "Cyclone" wire fence and is flanked to the east by the automatic telephone exchange, constructed on the eastern half of the site around the late 1960s. The remaining site area is unbuilt.

The Maple Street elevation presents a broad projecting wing on its north side, with a timber-planked spandrel approximating half-timbering. Below that is a non-original signage panel and paired window bay containing non-original timber-framed awning and fixed sashes screened by a timber-framed sunhood. The projecting bay is flanked by the original entrance verandah which screens the remaining west elevation and is accessed via the altered front steps or more recent concrete and timber disabled access ramp. The verandah return along the southern elevation was added in two stages, c.1960 and 1996. The original verandah has a simple timber-framed balustrade and carved verandah brackets; the later verandah areas have been detailed to match. The verandah has a galvanised steel roof, an integral bellcast form with the main roof structure. The walls beneath the verandah retain sections of exposed stud frame but have been altered to accommodate additional bays of non-original private letter boxes. The main post office entry is through a non-original glazed door from the main verandah, in place of the original paired timber doors. The front elevation is otherwise filled with bays of non-original private letter boxes and a central doorway in lieu of the original single bay of letter boxes, single door located further south and later public telephone booth.

The utilitarian rear elevation is a composition of hipped-roofed bays relating to the original store rooms and recessed central verandah/porch area. The rear verandah bay has now been infilled, the steps reconfigured and the original fenestration has been altered a number of times from the original larger windows with sunhoods to a series of smaller bathroom windows.

The original design of Cooroy Post Office was an asymmetrically composed double-fronted building housing a moderately-scaled postal hall and telegraph office with combined public space and small integrated telephone exchange room. The planning arrangement provided dual but independent operation of the postal and telegraphic functions around the single postal hall and counter with minimal space for mail sorting, telegraphic functions and staff facilities. The key alterations to the building concern the addition of extra private letter boxes and public verandahs on the southern side of the building, brick infill of the former timber panels to elevated base of the front elevation, alterations to interior planning for the provision of a retail post shop and later the gradual removal of the telegraphic and telephone functions of the building and general refurbishment of the place.

The building's original plan form has been altered by changes to circulation and function resulting in the removal of walls throughout the office and alterations to the south verandah. A small number of internal elements such as joinery details and timber-lined walls and bulkheads, serve to demonstrate the original aesthetic quality and configuration of the original interior spaces, though in the case of the public space, this is new fabric associated with relining of the space.

Notwithstanding the changed pattern of use and the enlarged verandah areas, the external presentation of the building is still able to demonstrate aspects of the original design, including the hipped and gabled roof form, the projecting public space gabled bay, entrance verandah, weatherboard-clad elevations and various timberwork details.

The original fabric of the building comprises:

- Structural frame: Timber floor, wall and roof framing on timber pole stumps.
- External walls: Timber weatherboard cladding to stud-framed walls; original verandah areas had exposed vertical and horizontal studs; sub-floor spaces enclosed by vertical timber battens.
- Internal walls: Lined with V-jointed timber lining boards; expressed hardwood stud frame; finished with moulded timber architraves.
- Floor: Timber floor boards with narrow moulded timber skirting boards. Ceiling: V-jointed timber board-lined ceilings with moulded timber cornices.
- Roof: Hipped bellcast form with broad projecting gabled bay and integral verandahs; all roof probably clad with crimped iron or possibly corrugated galvanised iron. Exposed rafters with verandah soffits lined with beaded timber lining boards. Front gable features simple fretwork screen to end and timber name board bearing the inscription "POST & TELEGRAPH OFFICE".
- Single and paired timber-framed casement sashes which are screened by timber-framed sunhoods to the north, west and east elevations. Original drawings do not indicate sunhoods on southern windows, however they are evident in a photograph taken in 1948.
- Timber framed verandahs are integral with main roof in a bellcast form and are finished with simple timber balustrades, steps and paired verandah posts with carved brackets. Internal doors are four-panelled timber with glazed operable fanlight over.
- Grounds originally enclosed by timber post and rail fence with Cyclone wire infill.

From about 1946 to 1957, various alterations occurred including construction of additional verandah area along the southern side of building and may have included replacement of original casement sash windows in front elevation with awning sash windows, the construction of external public telephone cabinet on footpath adjacent to northwest corner of building and the installation of additional private letter boxes.

At some time prior to 1989, a single-storey flat roofed building was constructed to north of main office area, the sub-floor areas were enclosed with cream brick dwarf walls, lower sashes of front windows infilled and original room at northeast corner of building subdivided and refurbished with FC linings to provide internal staff toilet facilities.

The rear verandah is enclosed to form staff lunch room.

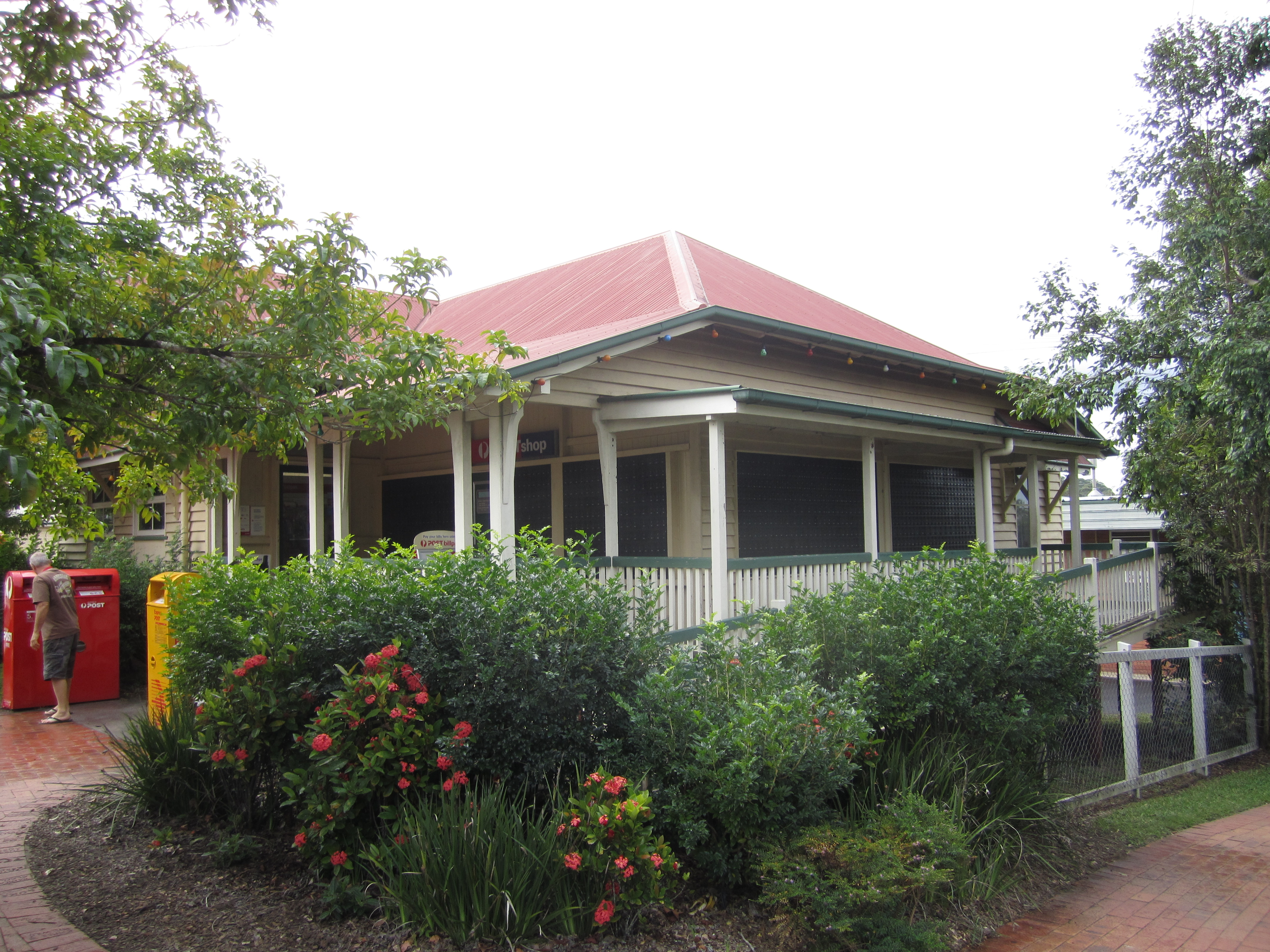
Garnet Street side view with disabled ramp, 2012

Around 1988 to 1990 there was a refurbishment of the office area to upgrade retail facilities. Works included demolition of existing private letter boxes, original timber entrance steps and balustrade and internal partition walls within public space and mail room. Installation of enlarged private letter box bays into side verandah area, new floor finishes, lighting, removal of skirting boards and some joinery, reconstruction of timber wall linings in public space and some plasterboard wall linings, installation of new cornices and counter joinery.

In 1996, there was refurbishment and upgrade of the retail facilities. A disabled access ramp and extension to the non-original verandah were installed across the south side elevation. The brick addition on the north side of the building appears to have been removed by this date.

In 2004, new counter joinery was installed in public space and retail display units were upgraded.

=== Condition ===
Externally and internally the building is in sound condition, well maintained and with no major defects visible.

== Heritage listing ==
The significant components of Cooroy Post Office include the main 1913 post office building, but do not include later additions such as the public verandahs on the southern side, disabled access ramp, the single-storey flat-roofed addition to the north of the main office area and the 1960s telephone exchange on the east. The cast iron pillar posting box marked "JS Engineering Co., Brisbane", located at the street corner of the site, is object of significant interest, but it is not known if the pillar box is actually located on Australia Post property (and hence not eligible for inclusion on the Commonwealth Heritage List).

Cooroy Post Office was listed on the Australian Commonwealth Heritage List on 22 August 2012 having satisfied the following criteria.

Criterion A: Processes

Cooroy Post Office, opened in 1913 and built to a design by the Queensland Government Architect Office under AB Brady, has some historical value as a post office remaining in continuous operation since the early twentieth century. This value, however, is enhanced through the post office being one of a limited number of generally modestly-scaled timber post offices still in operation. It is also an extension of contemporary progressive residential work in Queensland and one of the few examples of this development remaining as an operating post office. Although alterations to the building over a long period have had some impac on its heritage value, it remains significant at a local level.

Criterion D: Characteristic values

Cooroy Post Office is an example of:

- a post and telegraph office (second generation typology 1870–1929);
- a Federation period single porch and gable timber form with integrated exchange;
- the work of the Queensland Government Architect Office under AB Brady.

Typologically, Cooroy Post Office, built in 1913, was constructed towards the close of a second typology of post offices dated 1870–1929. These post offices generally incorporated a separate component for the telegraph functions in addition to a postmaster's residential quarters. In this instance, however, there was no accommodation for a residence. In the state context, this particular grouping of functions is considered as a descriptor of a post office type known as T18 (Single Porch, Gable and Lantern example) of which 14 known examples were built throughout Queensland during 1909–1913. Cooroy was constructed towards the end of this phase. The typology of the building has been impacted by alterations including the gradual removal of the telegraphic and telephone functions from the building; and changes to circulation resulting in the removal of interior walls throughout. A small number of internal elements such as joinery details and timber-lined walls and bulkheads, serve to demonstrate the aesthetic quality and configuration of the original interior spaces, although in the case of the public space, this is predominantly new fabric associated with reconfiguration of the space. Architecturally and stylistically, Cooroy Post Office is a good if not high order example of Queensland's Federation-era timber post office designs, although alterations to the planning and form, including the enlarged verandah areas, have had some impact on the building's principal frontages to Maple and Garnet streets. While the building is still able to demonstrate aspects of the original design, including the hipped and gabled roof form, the projecting public space gabled bay, entrance verandah, and various timberwork details, the more recent alterations including the disabled ramps, additional private letter box bays and alterations to the entrance points of the building have impacted on the building's presentation.

Criterion E: Aesthetic characteristics

Cooroy Post Office, with its prominent bay, return verandah form, and elevated siting with views of the building "in the round", has some visual presence in its streetscape context, and retains early or original elements and detailing which point to its Federation origins.
