= Coles Creek, Queensland =

Coles Creek
- Suburb
- Interactive map of Coles Creek
- Coordinates: 26.3541°S 152.7388°E
- Country: Australia
- State: Queensland
- LGA: Gympie Region
- Location: 16.3 km (10.1 mi) W of Pomona; 19.7 km (12.2 mi) NE of Imbil; 22.3 km (13.9 mi) NW of Cooroy; 22.8 km (14.2 mi) S of Gympie; 159 km (99 mi) N of Brisbane

Government
  - State electorate: Gympie
  - Federal division: Wide Bay

Area
  - Total: 14.8 km^{2} (5.7 sq mi)

Population
  - Total: 68 (2021 census)
  - Density: 4.59/km^{2} (11.90/sq mi)
- Time zone: UTC+10:00 (AEST)
- Postcode: 4570
Suburbs around Coles Creek
Kybong	Traveston	Traveston
Amamoor	Coles Creek	Cooran
Kandanga	Tuchekoi	Tuchekoi

Coles Creek is a rural locality in the Gympie Region, Queensland, Australia. In the 2021 census, Coles Creek had a population of 68 people.

== Geography ==
The Mary River forms the western and south-western boundaries. Coles Creek (the watercourse) flows through from east to north, where it forms part of the northern boundary before it joins the Mary. Skyring Creek forms the southern boundary before it flows into the Mary.

The Bruce Highway enters from the east (Cooran) and exits to north (Traveston).

== History ==
Traveston Provisional School opened on 24 August 1891. In 1907, the school was renamed Skyring's Creek Provisional School. On 1 January 1909, it became Skyring's Creek State School. In 1915, the school was renamed Coles Creek State School. It closed on 27 February 1961. The school was located on the northern corner of the Old Bruce Highway and Coles Creek Road (approx 26.3682°S 152.7545°E).

== Demographics ==
In the 2016 census, Coles Creek had a population of 44 people.

In the 2021 census, Coles Creek had a population of 68 people.

== Education ==
There are no schools in Coles Creek. The nearest government primary schools are Dagun State School in Dagun to the north-west and Federal State School in Federal to the south-east. The nearest government secondary schools are Mary Valley State College (to Year 10) in Imbil to the south-west, Gympie State High School (to Year 12) in Gympie to the north, and Noosa District State High School which has its junior campus in Pomona to the east and its senior campus in Cooroy to the south-east.
