= Black Mountain, Queensland =

Black Mountain
- Suburb
- Interactive map of Black Mountain
- Coordinates: 26.4194°S 152.8541°E
- Country: Australia
- State: Queensland
- LGA: Shire of Noosa
- Location: 6.2 km (3.9 mi) NW of Cooroy; 6.2 km (3.9 mi) SE of Pomona; 17.5 km (10.9 mi) W of Tewantin; 132 km (82 mi) N of Brisbane

Government
  - State electorate: Nicklin
  - Federal division: Wide Bay

Area
  - Total: 32.6 km^{2} (12.6 sq mi)

Population
  - Total: 1,560 (2021 census)
  - Density: 47.85/km^{2} (123.9/sq mi)
- Time zone: UTC+10:00 (AEST)
- Postcode: 4563
Suburbs around Black Mountain
Federal	Pomona	Cooroy
West Cooroy National Park	Black Mountain	Cooroy
Ridgewood	Ridgewood	Cooroy

Black Mountain is a rural locality in the Shire of Noosa, Queensland, Australia. In the 2021 census, Black Mountain had a population of 1,560 people.

== Geography ==
The locality Black Mountain is located west of Cooroy and south of Pomona.

Black Mountain is a mountain in the centre of the locality (26.4222°S 152.8546°E), rising to a peak of 312 metres (1,024 ft) above sea level. The locality presumably takes its name from the mountain. The peak of the mountain has a number of communications towers on it; it is accessed by Eungella Drive.

The Bruce Highway (now built to a freeway standard continuous four-lanes to Brisbane) enters the locality from the north-east (Cooroy) and forms part of the locality's northern boundary with Pomona.

The North Coast railway line forms a small part of the north-eastern boundary of the locality. No railway stations serve the locality, the nearest are in Cooroy railway station and Pomona railway station.

The land use is a mixture of rural residential (mostly in the north and east of the locality) and rural (mostly in the south and west of the locality). The main rural land use is grazing on native vegetation with some forestry.

== History ==
Black Mountain State School opened on 21 July 1913 in a temporary building loaned by farmer Edward James Bonnell, while the school building was constructed on 1.5 acres (0.61 ha) of land donated by Bonnell, opening on 5 August 1914. It was at 482 Black Mountain Road (26.4219°S 152.8466°E). The first teacher was Miss Catherine Alice Bergin. The school closed for a period in 1919 due to the Spanish flu epidemic. It closed permanently on 31 December 1961. The school building is still extant, having been converted to a residence.

Between 2008 and 2013, Black Mountain (and the rest of the Shire of Noosa) was within Sunshine Coast Region.

== Demographics ==
In the 2006 census, Black Mountain had a population of 1,043 people.

In the 2011 census, Black Mountain had a population of 1,175 people (582 men and 593 women).

In the 2016 census, Black Mountain had a population of 1,444 people.

In the 2021 census, Black Mountain had a population of 1,560 people.

== Economy ==
Black Mountain is home to several boutique rural enterprises and artists' studios.

== Education ==
There are no schools in Black Mountain. The nearest government primary schools are Pomona State School in neighbouring Pomona to the north, Cooroy State School in neighbouring Cooroy to the east, and Federal State School in neighbouring Federal to the west. The nearest government secondary school is Noosa District State High School, which has its Years 7 & 8 campus in Pomona and its Years 9 to 12 campus in Cooroy.
