= Ridgewood, Queensland =

Ridgewood Queensland
- Coordinates: 26.4611°S 152.8336°E
- Population: 317 (2021 census)
  - Density: 8.149/km^{2} (21.11/sq mi)
- Postcode(s): 4563
- Area: 38.9 km^{2} (15.0 sq mi)
- Time zone: AEST (UTC+10:00)
- Location: 13.6 km (8 mi) WSW of Cooroy; 20.2 km (13 mi) SW of Pomona; 26.5 km (16 mi) WSW of Tewantin; 154 km (96 mi) N of Brisbane
- LGA(s): Shire of Noosa
- State electorate(s): Nicklin
- Federal division(s): Wide Bay
Suburbs around Ridgewood:
Tuchekoi; Federal	Black Mountain	Black Mountain
Carters Ridge	Ridgewood	Cooroy
Belli Park	Belli Park	Belli Park

Ridgewood is a rural locality in the Shire of Noosa, Queensland, Australia. In the 2021 census, Ridgewood had a population of 317 people.

== Geography ==
Ridgewood is in the Sunshine Coast hinterland about 32 kilometres (20 mi) west of Noosa Heads.

== History ==
Mary River Road Provisional School opened in 1916. Circa 1918, it was renamed Ridgewood State School. It closed circa 1961. It was on Cooroy Belli Creek Road (approx 26.4532°S 152.8251°E).

The area was named Ridgewood in 1917 by the local progress association, previously just being known as Mary River Road.

Between 2008 and 2013, Ridgewood (and the rest of the Shire of Noosa) was within Sunshine Coast Region due to an unpopular local government amalgamation that was subsequently reversed.

== Demographics ==
In the 2006 census, Ridgewood had a population of 612 people.

In the 2016 census, Ridgewood had a population of 307 people.

In the 2021 census, Ridgewood had a population of 317 people.

== Education ==
There are no schools in Ridgewood. The nearest government primary schools are Cooroy State School in neighbouring Cooroy to the north-east, Federal State School in neighbouring Federal to the north-west, and Eumundi State School in Eumundi to the east. The nearest government secondary school is Noosa District State High School which has its junior campus in Pomona to the north and its senior campus in Cooroy.
