= 2007 Queensland local government area amalgamation plebiscites =

In late 2007, plebiscites on the amalgamation of the local government areas of Queensland were held. They were federally funded and would not have any effect on the amalgamation, as it would take place regardless of the plebiscites' results.

The plebiscites (conducted by postal voting only) began on 26 November 2007 in the first week after the 2007 federal election, when around 700,000 voters in 85 councils began receiving their ballots. The ballots closed on 7 December 2007 for voters in Caboolture Shire Council, Caloundra City Council, Gold Coast City Council, Noosa Shire Council, Pine Rivers Shire Council and Redcliffe City Council and on 14 December 2007 for all others. Voters were asked to simply state whether they agree with the mergers or not; voting was not compulsory. While anti-amalgamation campaigner Bob Ansett claimed that the state government and newly elected Prime Minister of Australia Kevin Rudd would not be able to ignore a strong vote against the mergers, Queensland's Local Government Minister Warren Pitt stated that the result of the plebiscites would have no influence on the mergers, which took place in March 2008 with the LGA elections. Pitt reiterated on 2007-12-12 that the plebiscites would not stop the amalgamation.

The results for the Councils which voted by 2007-12-07 were as follows:

Council	Turnout	"No" votes
Caboolture Shire Council	46%	62%
Caloundra City Council	52%	69%
Gold Coast City Council	54%	81%
Noosa Shire Council	69%	95%
Pine Rivers Shire Council	49%	73%
Redcliffe City Council	58%	86%

More results became known on 2007-12-17, with the rest were announced on 2007-12-18. A majority was against the merger in almost all councils, though turnout was very low in many occasions, weakening the standing of the "no" results. Two councils which merged into the Torres Strait Island Regional Council were in favour, though, and voters in Burnett Shire Council were about evenly split on the issue, with 5,203 votes in favour and 5,107 against.

Voters in southern Queensland broadly rejected the mergers, as did all Wide Bay residents (except for Burnett Shire Council, as mentioned above) and in western Queensland.
