= West Cooroy National Park =

National park in Queensland, Australia

- IUCN category II (national park)
- Location within Queensland
- Location: Queensland
- Nearest city: Cooroy
- Coordinates: 26.4815°S 152.8393°E
- Area: 11.5 km^{2} (4.4 sq mi)
- Established: 25 January 2023
- Governing body: Queensland Parks and Wildlife Service

The West Cooroy National Park is a national park in Queensland, Australia. It is situated to the west and south-west of Cooroy in the Noosa hinterland.

== Transfer from state forest ==
On 25 January 2023 the former West Cooroy State Forest was transferred to the Department of Environment and Science as a newly created national park at no cost to the community. The site was not previously subject to any forestry work and therefore no ownership buyout was required.

== See also ==
- Noosa Biosphere Reserve
- Protected areas of Queensland
