= Cooran, Queensland =

Cooran
- Town
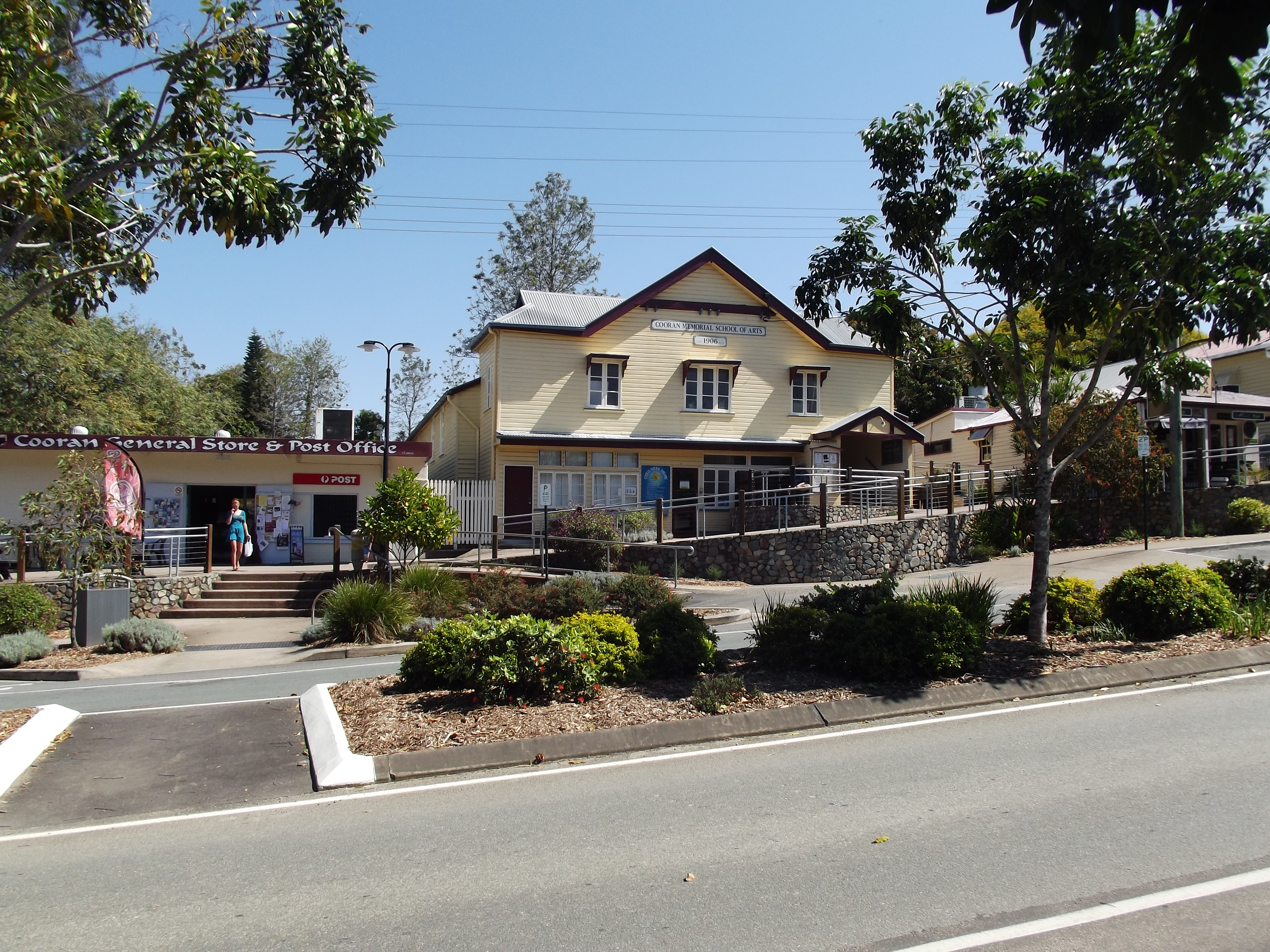
- Cooran Memorial School of Arts

- Interactive map of Cooran
- Coordinates: 26.3352°S 152.8230°E
- Country: Australia
- State: Queensland
- City: Sunshine Coast
- LGA: Shire of Noosa
- Location: 16.5 km (10.3 mi) NW of Cooroy; 30.3 km (18.8 mi) WNW of Tewantin; 31 km (19 mi) SE of Gympie; 57.1 km (35.5 mi) NNW of Maroochydore; 146 km (91 mi) N of Brisbane

Government
  - State electorates: Nicklin; Noosa
  - Federal division: Wide Bay

Area
  - Total: 37.9 km^{2} (14.6 sq mi)
- Elevation: 84 m (276 ft)

Population
  - Total: 1,756 (2021 census)
  - Density: 46.33/km^{2} (120.00/sq mi)
- Time zone: UTC+10:00 (AEST)
- Postcode: 4569
Localities around Cooran
| Mothar Mountain | Kin Kin | Pinbarren |
| Traveston Coles Creek | Cooran | Pomona |
| Tuckekoi | Federal | Pomona |

Cooran is a rural hinterland town and locality in the Shire of Noosa, Queensland, Australia. In the 2021 census, the locality of Cooran had a population of 1,756 people.

== Geography ==
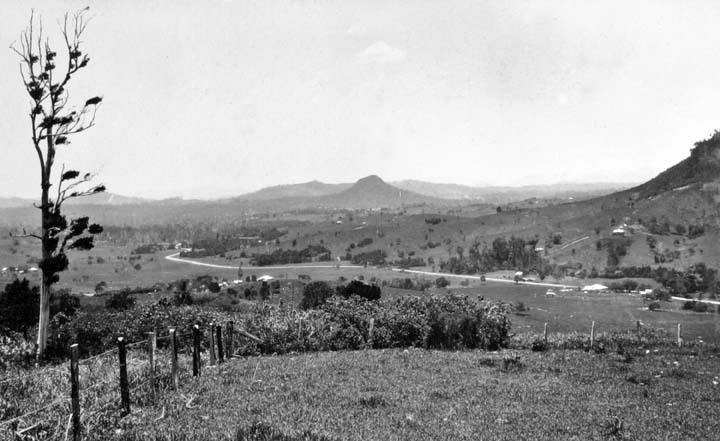
Looking towards Cooran from Pinbarren, circa 1931

Cooran is predominantly farming land with its urban centre in the north of the locality. Pinbarren Creek and Six Mile Creek flow from east to west through the northern part of the locality, while Coles Creek flows from east to west through the southern part of the locality. All the creeks flow into the Mary River.

The Bruce Highway passes through the south-west corner of the locality but does not pass through the town. The major routes to the town are Traveston Road (from the north-west), Coles Creek Road from the south-west and Greenridge-Pinbarren Road from the east.

The North Coast railway line passes through the town and northern part of the locality, to the north of Traveston Road. Cooran is served by the Cooran railway station in the centre of the town (26.3340°S 152.8227°E).

Mount Cooran is a very distinctive peak in the landscape (26°22′13″S 152°48′43″E).

== History ==
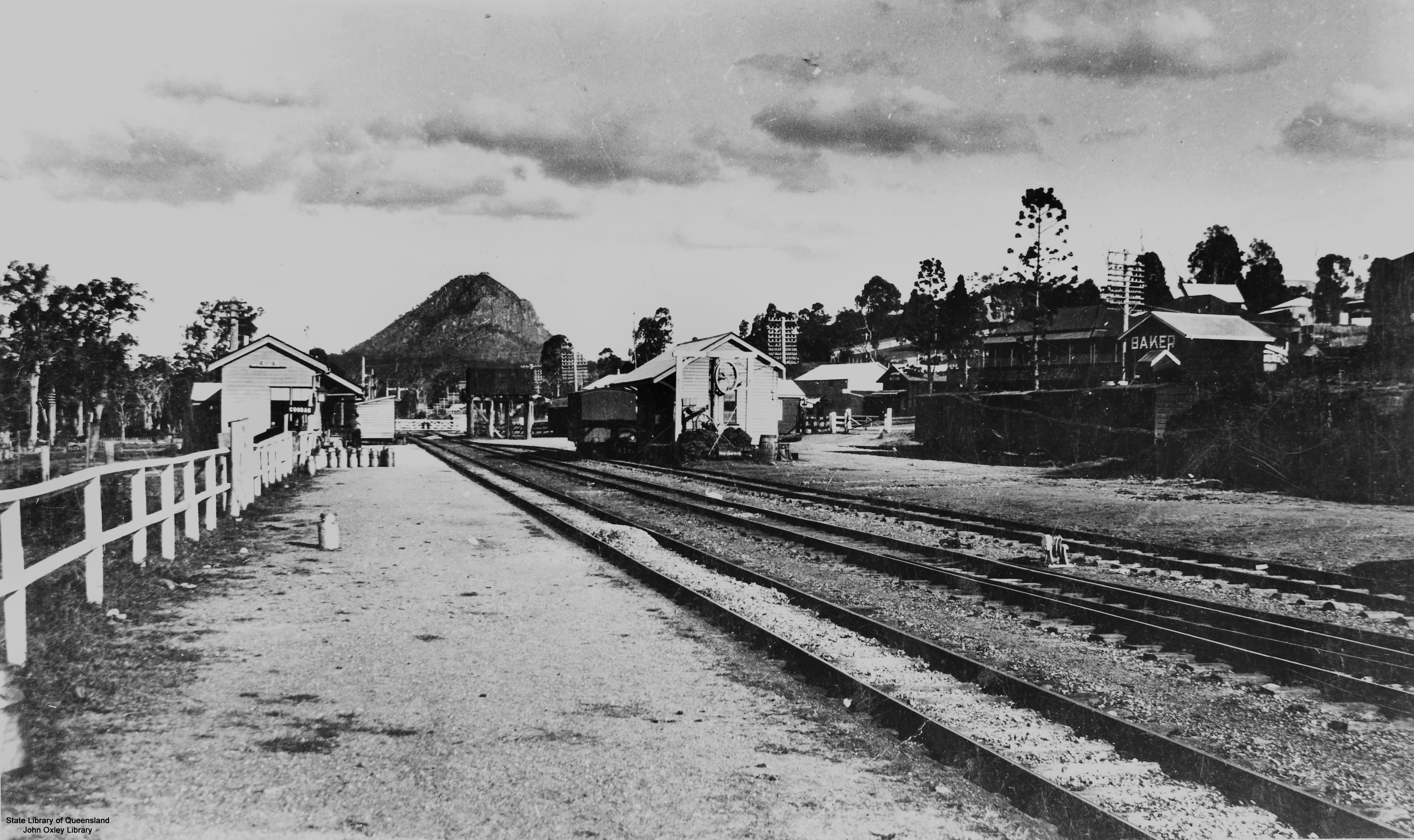
Railway Station at Cooran Queensland with Mount Cooran in the background, ca. 1926

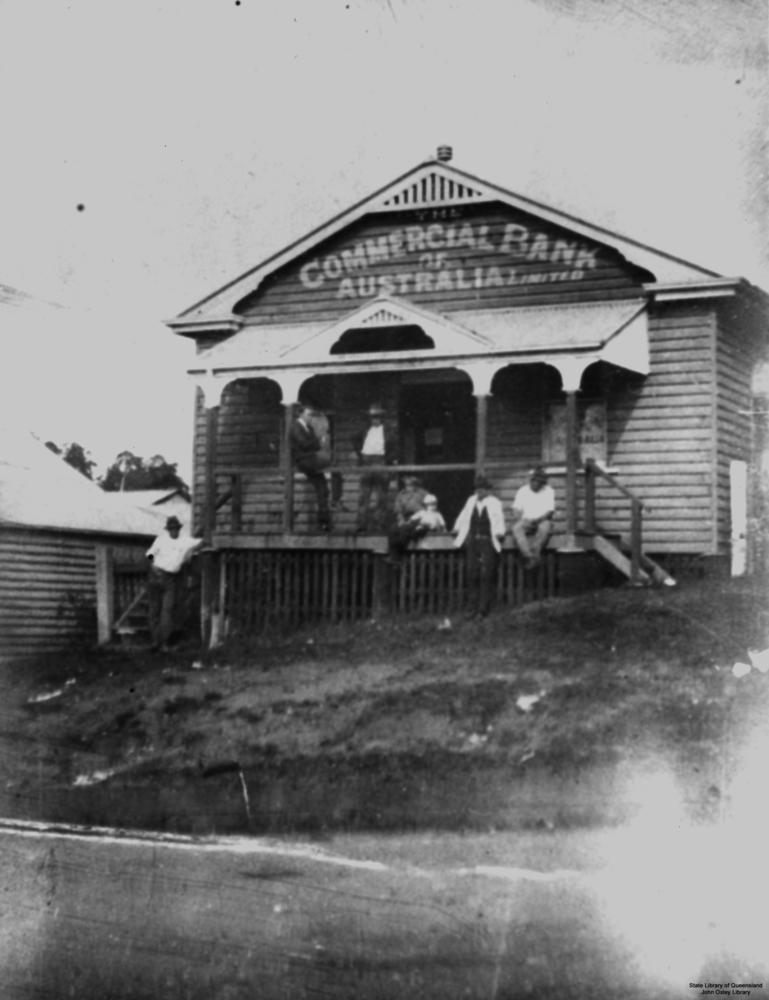
Commercial Bank of Australia, circa 1931

The name Cooran comes from guran or kuran, meaning tall in the Kabi language. This might refer to Mount Cooran or to the tall Moreton Bay ash trees (Eucalyptus tessellaris).

Cooran Lagoon lies between the North Coast railway line and Railway Street near James Street (26.3396°S 152.8258°E), where the Aboriginals used it as a source of water-lily bulbs and mussels for food. The Indigenous name for the lagoon is Guran.

By 1878, the lagoon was the site of the Half Way Hotel (also known as the Half Way House) on the old Gympie-to-Tewantin coach road (also known as the Noosa Road). It was operated by William Casey, until he transferred the licence to William Martin in December 1881. Nothing remains of the hotel but the approximate site is marked with a plaque.

In December 1889, Martin transferred the hotel licence to his new Cooran Hotel at the Cooran railway station.

Cooran Post Office opened on 17 June 1889 (a receiving office had been open from 1888).

The Cooran Provisional School opened on 21 July 1890. It became Cooran State School in 1909.

In April 1906, William Martin had plans drawn up for a public hall. On Friday 17 August 1906, William Martin opened with his new hall with a free social event. The hall had a 60-by-25-foot (18.3 by 7.6 m) dance floor with a stage which was the full width of the hall and 8 feet (2.4 m) deep. It was lit by 3 Rochester lamps, each of which used one gallon of oil to produce the light of 100 candles for 12 hours. At that time, it was the largest event ever held in Cooran with around 200 people in attendance, some having ridden up to 20 miles (32 km) to attend.

St Matthew's Anglican Church was dedicated on 30 September 1913 by Archbishop St Clair Donaldson. It closed circa 1987.

In the 1920s and 30s, banana growing became an important industry around the town. For a period after World War II pineapple farms gained popularity in the district.

Between 2008 and 2013, Cooran (and the rest of Noosa Shire) was within Sunshine Coast Region.

== Demographics ==
In the 2011 census, the locality of Cooran had a population of 1,457 people.

In the 2016 census, the locality of Cooran had a population of 1,624 people.

In the 2021 census, the locality of Cooran had a population of 1,756 people.

== Heritage listings ==
Cooran has a number of heritage-listed sites, including:

- Alfredson's Joinery, 28 King Street

== Education ==
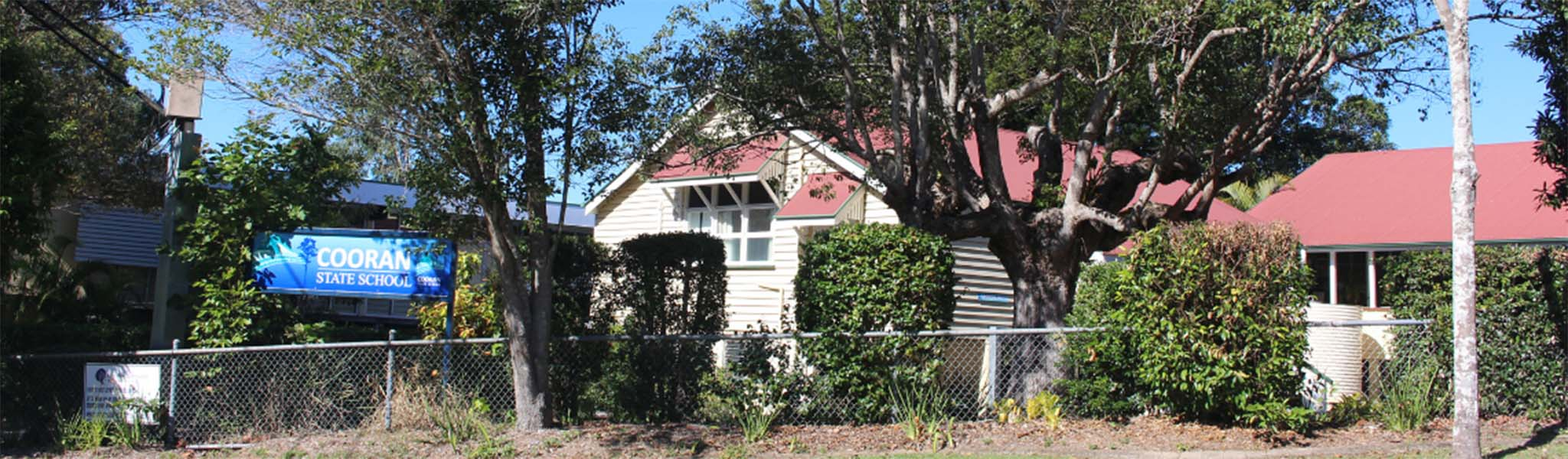
Cooran State School, 2025

Cooran State School is a government primary (Prep–6) school for boys and girls at 31 James Street (26.3406°S 152.8241°E). In 2018, the school had an enrolment of 134 students with 15 teachers (9 full-time equivalent) and 10 non-teaching staff (6 full-time equivalent).

There are no secondary schools in Cooran. The nearest government secondary school is Noosa District State High School. It has a campus offering schooling to Year 8 in neighbouring Pomona to the east with schooling to Year 12 available at its campus in Cooroy to the southeast.

== Amenities ==
Cooran Memorial School of Arts is at 14 King Street (26.3347°S 152.8222°E).

The Shire of Noosa operates a mobile library service on a weekly schedule in King Street.
