= Federal, Queensland =

Federal Queensland
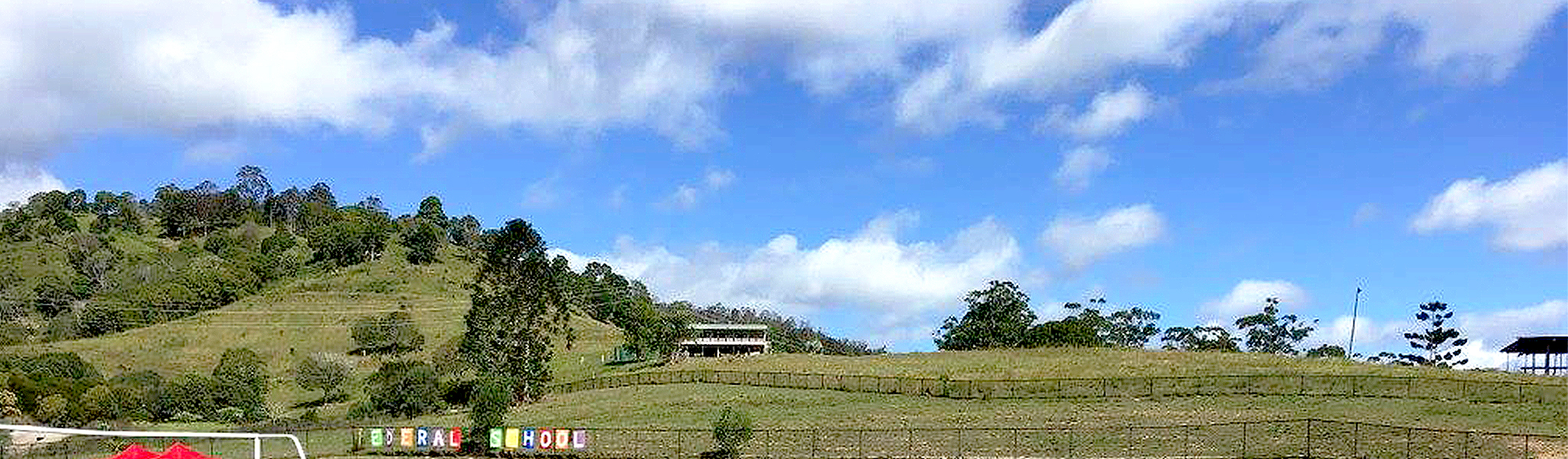

- Coordinates: 26.4002°S 152.8041°E
- Population: 365 (2021 census)
  - Density: 11.93/km^{2} (30.89/sq mi)
- Postcode(s): 4568
- Area: 30.6 km^{2} (11.8 sq mi)
- Time zone: AEST (UTC+10:00)
- Location: 16.0 km (10 mi) W of Cooroy; 32.4 km (20 mi) W of Tewantin; 143 km (89 mi) N of Brisbane CBD
- LGA(s): Shire of Noosa
- State electorate(s): Nicklin
- Federal division(s): Wide Bay
Suburbs around Federal:
Cooran	Cooran	Pomona
Tuchekoi	Federal	Black Mountain
Tuchekoi	Ridgewood	Black Mountain

Federal is a rural locality in the Shire of Noosa, Queensland, Australia. It is located in the Sunshine Coast hinterland near the towns of Cooran and Pomona. In the 2021 census, Federal had a population of 365 people.

== Geography ==
Skyring Creek, a tributary of the Mary River forms part of the northwest boundary of the locality. Federal is traversed by the Bruce Highway. The highway has seen two recent upgrades - one to the north and one to the south of Federal - costing more than $500 million each.

The land use is predominantly grazing on native vegetation.

== History ==
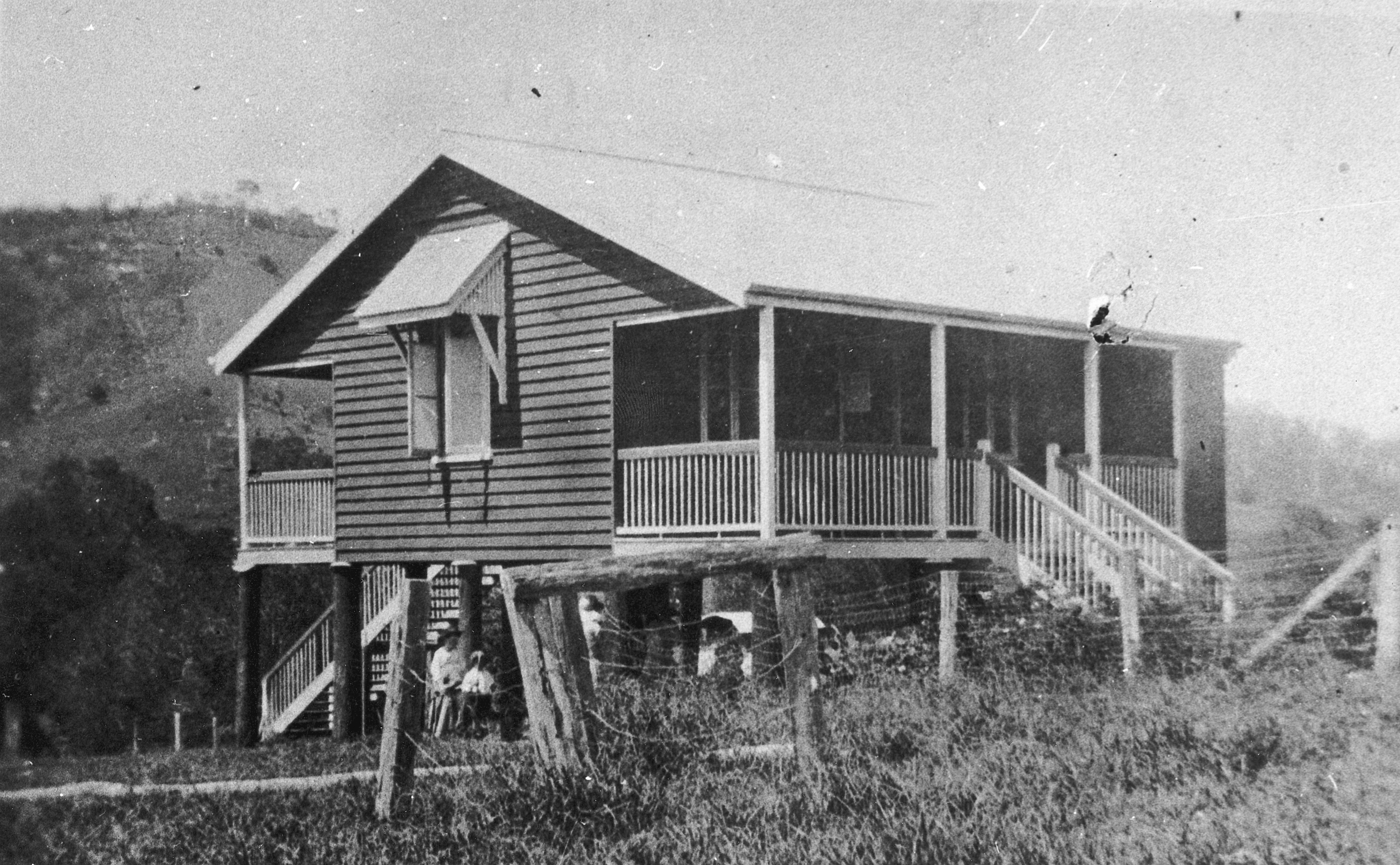
Federal State School, circa 1910

The area was originally known as Skyring Creek after brothers Zachariah and Daniel Skyring who established cattle runs in the district circa 1853. Their runs were named Canando, Yandina, Whidlka Whidlka (later Tuchekoi) and Pooreema, in total 61,850 acres (25,030 ha) of land north of the Maroochy River.

The name Federal refers to the arrival of a group of selectors from Federal in New South Wales in 1905–1906.

Federal State School opened on 14 February 1910.

Federal Memorial Hall opened on 26 September 1930.

Between 2008 and 2013, Federal (and the rest of the Shire of Noosa) was within Sunshine Coast Region.

== Demographics ==
In the 2011 census, Federal had a population of 320 people.

In the 2016 census, Federal had a population of 303 people.

In the 2021 census, Federal had a population of 365 people.

== Heritage listings ==
Federal has a number of heritage-listed sites, including:

- 1612 Bruce Highway: Federal State School
- 1642 Bruce Highway: Federal Memorial Hall

== Education ==
Federal State School is a government primary (Prep-6) school for boys and girls at 40 Middle Creek Road (26.3929°S 152.7943°E). In 2018, the school had an enrolment of 89 students with 11 teachers (7 full-time equivalent) and 7 non-teaching staff (4 full-time equivalent).

There are no secondary schools in Federal. The nearest government secondary school is Noosa District State High School which has its junior campus at neighbouring Pomona to the north-east and its senior campus at Cooroy to the east.

== Amenities ==
The Shire of Noosa operates a mobile library on a weekly schedule at the Federal State School during the school terms.

Social life centres on the Federal Memorial Hall on 2 Skyring Road (Old Bruce Highway, 26.3891°S 152.7941°E).

== Economy ==
There are a number of homesteads in the locality:

- Cliona Lodge (26.3836°S 152.7834°E)
- Dunromin (26.4064°S 152.8110°E)
- Monte Video (26.4258°S 152.8051°E)
