= Tuchekoi, Queensland =

Tuchekoi
- Suburb
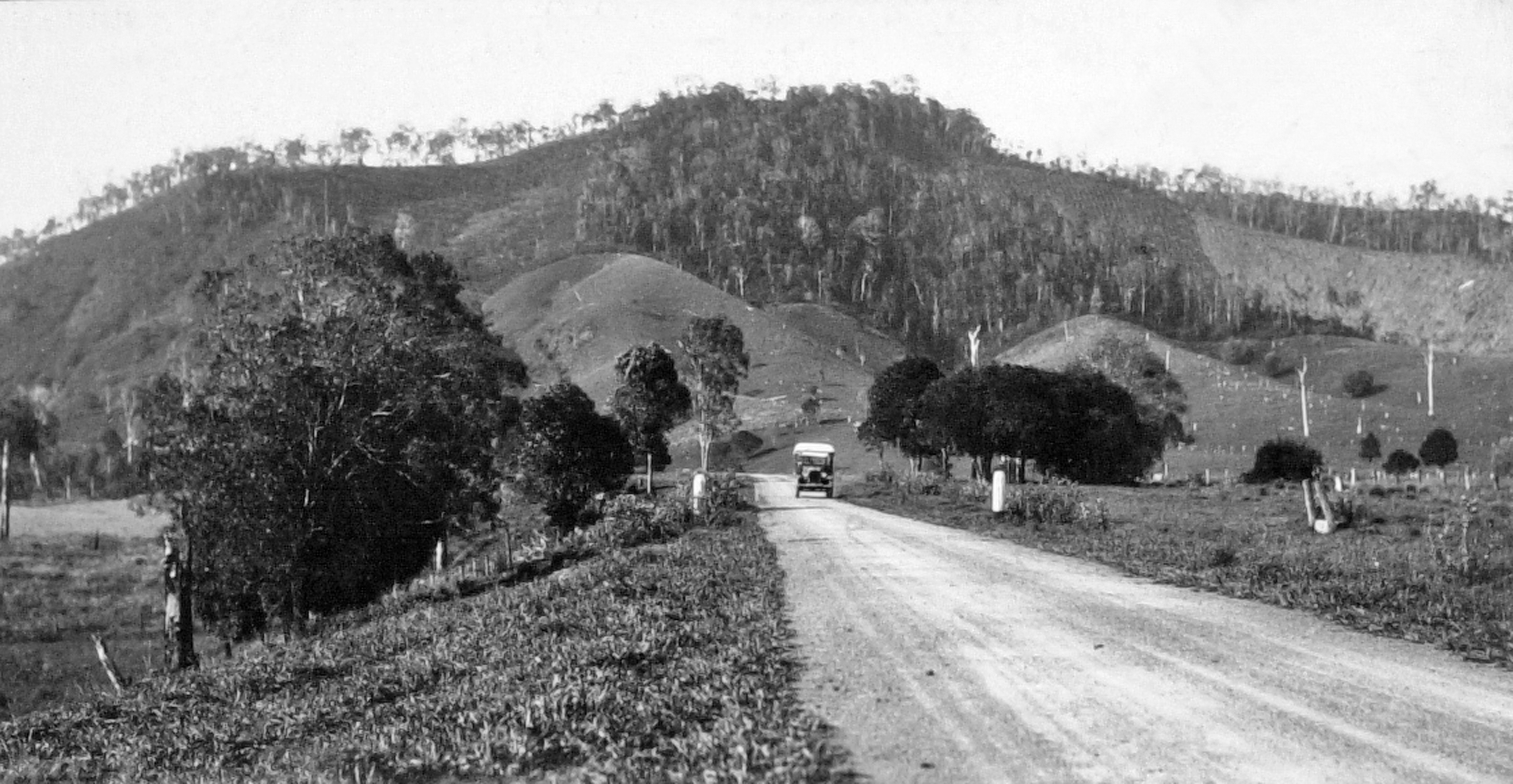
- Looking toward Mount Tuchekoi, circa 1931

- Interactive map of Tuchekoi
- Coordinates: 26.4063°S 152.7663°E
- Country: Australia
- State: Queensland
- LGA: Gympie Region
- Location: 13.4 km (8.3 mi) NE of Imbil; 18.0 km (11.2 mi) WSW of Pomona; 23.7 km (14.7 mi) W of Cooroy; 30.8 km (19.1 mi) SSE of Gympie; 161 km (100 mi) N of Brisbane

Government
  - State electorate: Gympie
  - Federal division: Wide Bay

Area
  - Total: 29.9 km^{2} (11.5 sq mi)

Population
  - Total: 199 (2021 census)
  - Density: 6.656/km^{2} (17.24/sq mi)
- Time zone: UTC+10:00 (AEST)
- Postcode: 4570
Suburbs around Tuchekoi
Kandanga	Coles Creek	Cooran
Kandanga	Tuchekoi	Federal
Bollier	Carters Ridge	Ridgewood

Tuchekoi is a rural locality in the Gympie Region, Queensland, Australia. In the 2021 census, Tuchekoi had a population of 199 people.

== Geography ==
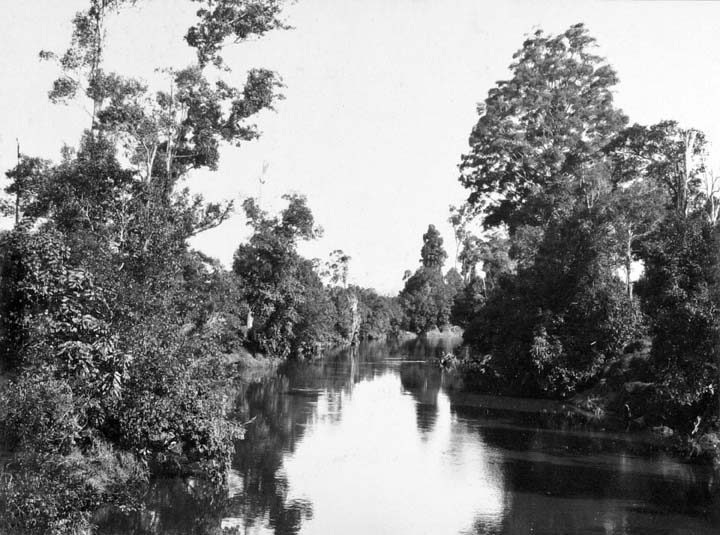
Mary River crossing at Tuchekoi, circa 1931

The Mary River forms the western boundary, while Skyring Creek forms the northern boundary and becomes a tributary of the Mary River at the north-west of the locality.

The terrain varies from 60 to 310 metres (200 to 1,020 ft) above sea level. The lower land is along the Mary River and Skyring Creek, but rises towards the south and east. There is one named peak, Mount Tuchekoi, which is in the centre of the locality (26.4039°S 152.7554°E), rising to 295 metres (968 ft).

The Old Bruce Highway enters the locality from the east (Federal) and exits to the north (Coles Creek). The current Bruce Highway passes further north-east and does not pass through Tuchekoi.

The land use is predominantly grazing on native vegetation with some plantation forestry.

Despite the name, Tuchekoi National Park is not in the locality of Tuchekoi, but in Pomona to the east.

== History ==
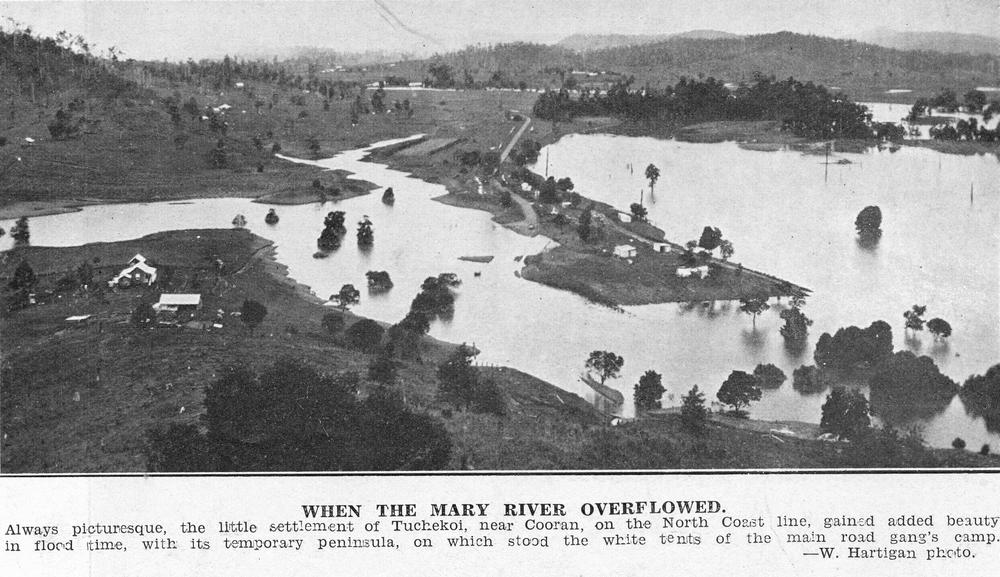
Flooding on the Mary River, 1931

The locality takes its name from Mount Tuchekoi, which in turn is believed to be a corruption of the Kabi language dha/chu/koi meaning place of fig trees.

== Demographics ==
In the 2016 census, Tuchekoi had a population of 197 people.

In the 2021 census, Tuchekoi had a population of 199 people.

== Education ==
There are no schools in Tuchekoi. The nearest government primary school is Federal State School in neighbouring Federal to the west. The nearest government secondary schools are Mary Valley State College (to Year 10) in Imbil to the south-west and Noosa District State High School (to Year 12), which has its junior campus (Years 7-8) in Pomona and its senior campus (Years 9-12) in Cooroy, both to the east of Tuchekoi.

There is an outdoor education centre at 115 Kress Road (26.3970°S 152.7582°E).
