= Shire of Noosa =

Coordinates: 26°23′19″S 153°02′05.3″E

- Local government area
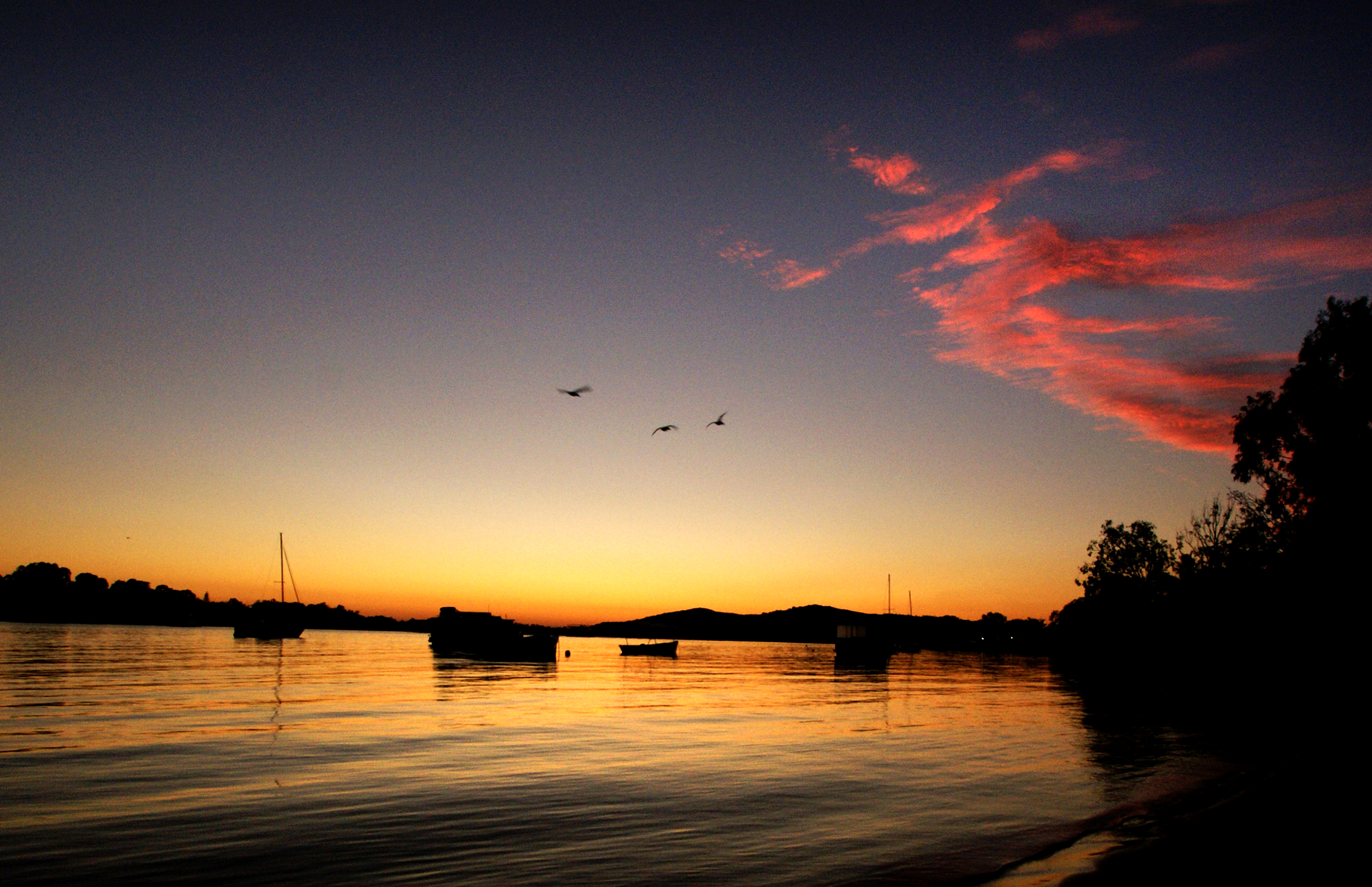
- Location within South East Queensland Sunrise in Noosa

- Interactive map of Shire of Noosa
- Country: Australia
- State: Queensland
- Region: South East Queensland
- Established: 11 May 1910 – 15 March 2008; 1 January 2014
- Council seat: Tewantin

Government
  - Mayor: Frank Wilkie
  - State electorate: Noosa
  - Federal division: Wide Bay

Area
  - Total: 870 km^{2} (340 sq mi)

Population
  - Total: 56,298 (2021 census)
  - Density: 64.7/km^{2} (167.6/sq mi)
- Website: Shire of Noosa
LGAs around Shire of Noosa
Gympie	Gympie	Pacific Ocean
Gympie	Shire of Noosa	Pacific Ocean
Sunshine Coast	Sunshine Coast	Pacific Ocean

The Shire of Noosa (/ˈnuːsə/) is a local government area about 130 kilometres (81 mi) north of Brisbane in the Sunshine Coast district of South East Queensland, Australia. The shire covers an area of 870 square kilometres (335.9 sq mi). It existed as a local government entity from 1910 until 2008, when it was amalgamated with the Shire of Maroochy and City of Caloundra to form the Sunshine Coast Region. The shire was re-established on 1 January 2014. In the 2021 census, the shire had a population of 56,298 people.

== History ==
=== Geological history ===
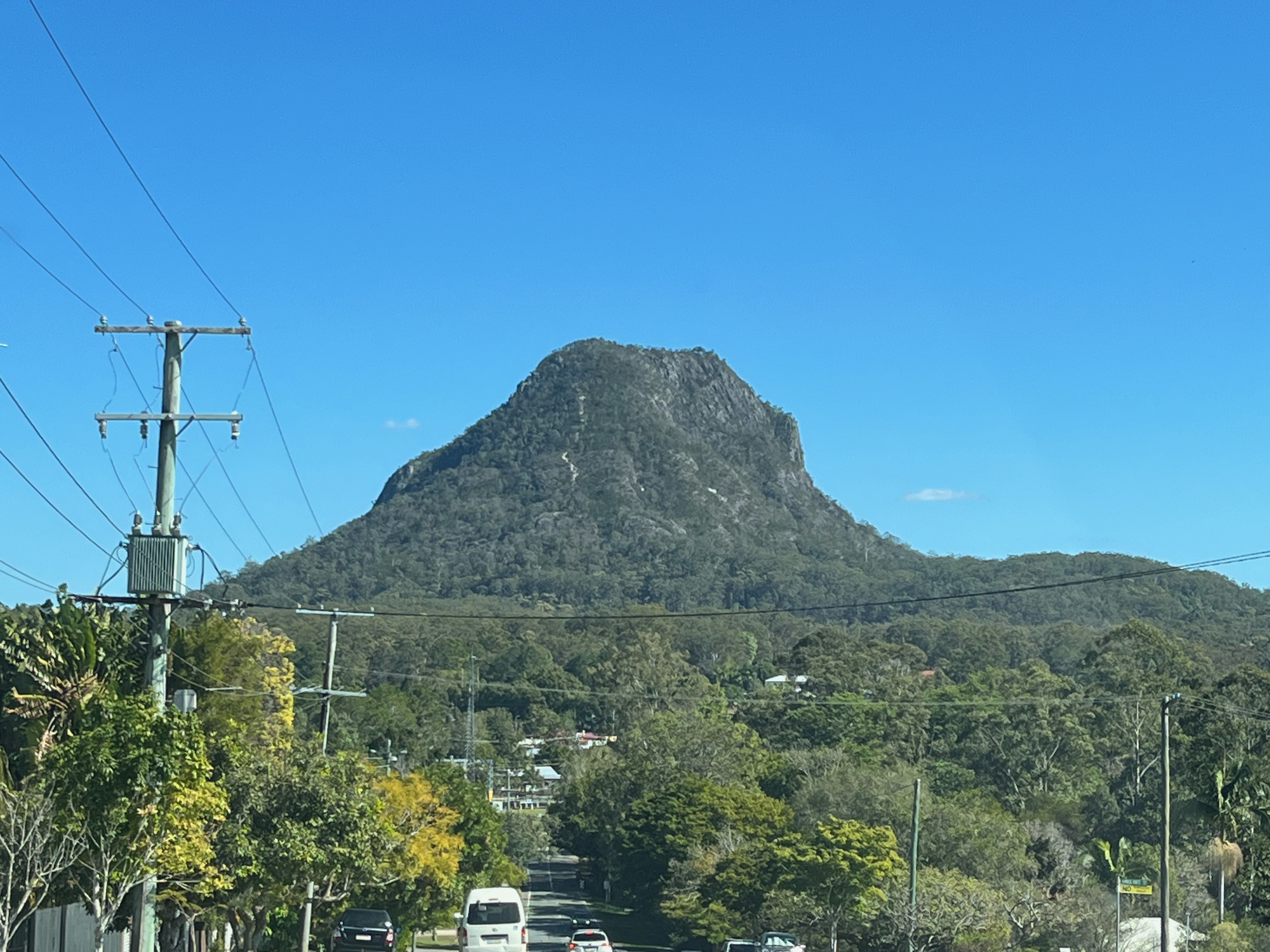
Mount Cooroora from Hill Street in July 2023

The Noosa Hinterland was formed during the Oligocene era around 25–30 million years ago when volcanic activity created the ranges. By the beginning of the Neolithic era, Noosa's coast experienced a change in sea level rises when its beaches and waterways began to take shape.

=== Ancient history ===
The Noosa area was originally home to several Aboriginal groups. They primarily include the Undumbi tribe to the south, the Dulingbara to the north, and the Kabi Kabi (or Gabbi Gabbi) to the west.

Gubbi Gubbi (Kabi Kabi, Cabbee, Carbi, Gabi Gabi) is an Australian Aboriginal language spoken on Gubbi Gubbi country. The Gubbi Gubbi language region includes the landscape within the local government boundaries of the Sunshine Coast Region and Gympie Region, particularly the towns of Caloundra, Noosa Heads, Gympie and extending north towards Maryborough and south to Caboolture.

In 2003, the Federal Court of Australia determined (title claim QC2013/003) that the native title holders for the Noosa area are the Kabi Kabi First Nation.

Although much of the culture and presence of the traditional owners of the Noosa district has been lost during the short period of white settlement, there still exist many subtle reminders. They include:

- bora rings, used during rituals.
- canoe trees, marks on trees where bark was removed for canoes.
- border/navigation trees, marks on trees used to mark paths and/or tribal borders.
- stone carvings
- burial trees
- middens, shell mound created by thousands of years of discarded shells.
- stone axes
- spoken legends, many local legends which were traditionally passed through the generations survive today.
- place names, many local names are versions of the original Aboriginal names.

It is widely accepted that the name Noosa comes from the local Aboriginal word "Noothera" or "Gnuthuru", in the Kabi Kabi language, for shadow or shady place. However this is unlikely as a 1870 map of Noosa by Royal Navy captain and marine surveyor George Poynter Heath shows the Noosa River written as Nusa River and a notice to mariners published 1873 refers to Nusa Head and the Nusa River in Laguna Bay. Nusa is the Indonesian word for island. The Noosa River contains Makepeace Island, Sheep Island and Goat Island. Laguna Bay was previously known as Nusa Bay and Lagoona Bay.

A Keeping Place of indigenous cultural and sacred objects is maintained at the Noosa Shire Museum, Pomona.

=== Early European settlement ===
Although reports of the area can be traced back to Captain Cook's voyages in May 1770, European settlement in the region did not proceed until almost a century later. The difficulty of transport in the region, which persisted to the 1920s and beyond, was one major reason for that. European settlement was initially driven by timber logging, and then by a gold rush in the Gympie area, north of Noosa.

In 1871, the government laid out a port at Tewantin. The surrounding land was duly surveyed and, by 1877, contained two hotels, a boarding house, school, police station and telegraph office. In 1872, the Noosa Heads and coastal region south to Peregian Beach was set aside as an Aboriginal Mission, but that was cancelled in 1878, and land was opened for selection on 15 January 1879. With the construction of the North Coast Railway inland from Tewantin, the port declined in importance after 1890.

Noosa is a region, not a town. It contains beaches and a beach national park, the cleanest river in South-East Queensland and an extensive trail network inland, linking a number of lifestyle villages, including Cooroy and Pomona. In the last 50 years, Noosa has been transformed from an isolated fishing village to a tourist destination. Although that has had its costs, the shire is known for its generally greener approach to development. Most development in Noosa has been restrained. There are no high-rise buildings, due both to local community pressure and to council planning action, and much remaining native forest. 34.8% of the Noosa district consists of National Parks, Conservation Parks, State Forests, and other generally protected land, including parts of the biosphere reserve.

One of the reasons for the popularity of Noosa Heads is that it is one of the few north-facing beaches on Australia's east coast, hence Noosa Beach is relatively protected from the prevailing on-shore wind and from storms.

=== Council history ===
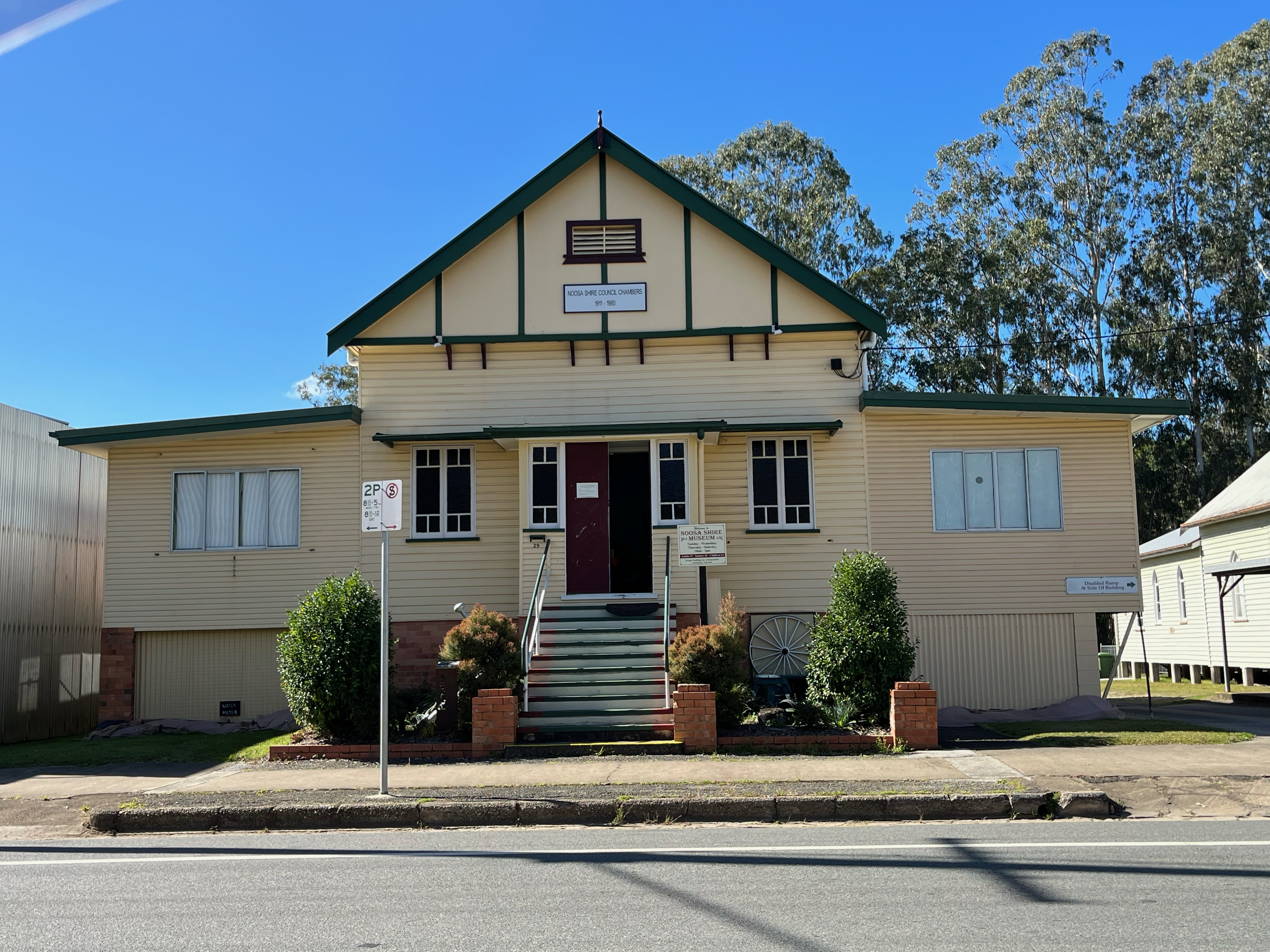
The Former Noosa Council Chambers used from 1911-1980

The area was originally incorporated on 11 November 1879, under the Divisional Boards Act 1879, as part of the Widgee Divisional Board. Noosa was created as a separate shire in 1910, under the Local Authorities Act 1902, with an initial population of 2,000. The first elections were held on 22 April 1910 and resulted in James Duke becoming the first shire chairman. The Noosa Shire Hall was constructed in Pomona in 1911.

On 8 September 1917, an Honour Roll was unveiled at the Noosa Shire Hall in Pomona, to commemorate those from the district who had left Australia to serve in the armed forces during World War I.

In the early 1970s, with Queensland Government backing, development commenced in the area around Noosa Sound. In December 1980, the shire headquarters moved to Pelican Street, Tewantin. The former shire hall in Pomona became the Noosa Museum, operated by the Cooroora Historical Society.

In 1982, the Noosa community elected a pro-environment and pro-planning council. The Councillors who were most influential in that change were elected in a group called The Resident's Team. They laid the foundation for many of the planning and environmental-protection concepts for which Noosa is now well known. The 1982–1985 Noosa Council was the first to introduce the idea of a development/population cap. This idea was initially proposed by the Council’s first full time resident Town Planner, Alan Simes in September 1984. The 1982–1985 Noosa Council created draft development control plans for Hastings Street, Noosa Junction and Tewantin. These draft development control plans had a major focus on development in Noosa maintaining and enhancing the character of Noosa. The 1982–1985 Council also introduced a focus on community arts, and the use of design and landscape controls in development applications. The business lobby, supported by several local media personalities, were successful in replacing that council with a pro-development one in the 1985 election but the pro-development council was, in turn, largely removed by the Noosa community in 1988, at the next election.

In 1995, mayor Noel Playford announced a "population cap" of 56,500 people for Noosa Shire, based on the initial concepts proposed during the 1982–1985 Council term by resident Town Planner Alan Simes . The population cap was the expected population under the planning scheme if all available land was developed in accordance with it. Noosa council had performed the calculation for all land in the shire and provided the results in strategic planning documents. Noosa was the first council in Australia to do so.

On 15 March 2008, under the Local Government (Reform Implementation) Act 2007, passed by the Parliament of Queensland in August 2007, the Shire of Noosa was merged with the Shire of Maroochy and the City of Caloundra to form the Sunshine Coast Region. Noosa's mayor, Bob Abbot, won the mayoralty of the new council over Maroochy's Joe Natoli, with 70% of the combined vote. The amalgamation occurred despite the 2007 Queensland local government area amalgamation plebiscite in Noosa Shire, conducted by the Australian Electoral Commission, in which 95% of voters rejected amalgamation.

In 2012, following a change of state government, a proposal was made to de-amalgamate the Shire of Noosa from the Sunshine Coast Region. On 9 March 2013, 81% of Noosa residents voted to de-amalgamate Noosa from the Sunshine Coast Region. On 18 March 2013, the Sunshine Coast Regional Council decided its new planning scheme should not apply to those areas that were part of the former Noosa Shire (different attitudes to planning and developments having been a major objection by residents of Noosa Shire to the amalgamation).

The Shire of Noosa was re-established on 1 January 2014, and the new councillors and mayor were sworn in the next day. In attendance were Warren Truss, Deputy Prime Minister of Australia and federal member for Wide Bay, as well as David Gibson, state member for Gympie. The ceremony was followed by the first meeting of the council, held at the Cooroy Memorial Hall, Cooroy.

In December 2024, Noosa Shire Council was the victim of a sophisticated fraud scheme in which approximately $2.3 million was transferred to overseas accounts by international criminals. The incident was publicly disclosed in October 2025, with investigations ongoing and around $400,000 reportedly recovered. The investigation has involved the Australian Federal Police and INTERPOL.

== Towns and localities ==
The Shire of Noosa includes the following settlements:

Greater Noosa:

- Castaways Beach
- Noosa Heads
- Noosaville
- Sunrise Beach
- Sunshine Beach
- Tewantin
- Tewantin National Park

Coastal Region:

- Como^{1}
- Marcus Beach
- Noosa National Park
- Noosa North Shore
- Peregian Beach^{2}
- Teewah

Hinterland:

- Black Mountain
- Boreen
- Boreen Point
- Cooran
- Cooroibah
- Cooroy
- Cooroy Mountain
- Cootharaba
- Doonan^{2}
- Eerwah Vale^{2}
- Federal
- Kin Kin
- Lake Macdonald
- Mount Pinbarren National Park
- Pinbarren
- Pomona
- Ridgewood
- Ringtail Creek
- Tinbeerwah
- Tuchekoi National Park
- West Cooroy National Park

^{1} - includes part of Great Sandy National Park
^{2} - shared with Sunshine Coast Region

== Demographics ==
Year	Population	Notes
1933	7,291	
1947	5,000	
1954	6,296	
1961	6,117	
1966	6,673	
1971	7,746	
1976	10,825	
1981	17,071	
1986	20,328	
1991	29,378	
1996	41,171	
2001	47,321	
2006	51,962	
2011	56,151	
2016	52,149	
2021	56,298	

As of 2021, Noosa has a relatively older population, with a median age of 52, considerably higher than the national median of 38.5. The majority of residents, 71.7%, are Australian-born, while 14.2% were born in the United Kingdom. Noosa's residents are primarily English-speaking, with 90.9% speaking only English at home. With regard to education, 22.3% of the population hold a bachelor's degree or higher, and 26.2% of the community volunteer for a group or organisation, suggesting a high level of community engagement. The residents of Noosa enjoy a comfortable lifestyle, with a median weekly household income of $1,256, higher than the national median.

== Council ==
Noosa Shire Council

Leadership
- Mayor: Frank Wilkie
- Deputy Mayor: Brian Stockwell

Structure
- Political groups: Independent (5); Independent Labor (2)

Elections
- Last election: 28 March 2024

Noosa Shire Council consists of directly-elected mayor and six councillors. The council is unsubdivided.

As of the 2024 election, there are 44,127 enrolled voters in Noosa Shire.

=== Current composition ===
The current council, elected in 2024, is:

Role	Councillor	Party	Term
Mayor	Frank Wilkie	Independent	2024–present (Mayor); 2016–2024 (Deputy Mayor); 2014–2024 (Councillor)
Deputy Mayor	Brian Stockwell	Independent ALP	2024–present (Deputy Mayor); 2016–present (Councillor)
Councillor	Amelia Lorenston	Independent	2020–present
Councillor	Tom Wegener	Independent	2020–present
Councillor	Karen Finzel	Independent	2020–present
Councillor	Nicola Wilson	Independent ALP	2024–present
Councillor	Jess Phillips	Independent	2024–present

== Chairmen and mayors ==
=== Elected by fellow councillors ===
- James Duke (1910–1911)
- Frank Conroy (1911–1914)
- Eugene von Blankensee (1914–1915)
- Alexander Chapman (1915–1916)
- Charles Livingstone (1916–1917)
- Alexander Parker (1917–1918)
- Alexander Chapman (1918–1919)
- Charles Crank (1919–1920)
- Alexander Parker (1920–1921)

=== Directly elected ===
- William Ferguson (1921–1927)
- Frederick Bryan (1927–1930)
- Charles Crank (1930–1939)
- William Ferguson (1939–1946)
- Robert McAnally (1946–1955)
- Victor Gee (1955–1958)
- S.T. (Stanley) Adams (1958–1964)
- Ian MacDonald (1964–1980)
- Bert Wansley AM (1980–1988)
- Noel Playford OAM (1988–1997)
- Bob Abbot (1997–2008)
- For mayor during amalgamation (2008–2013) see: Sunshine Coast Region
- Noel Playford OAM (2014–2016)
- Tony Wellington (2016–2020)
- Clare Stewart (2020–2024)
- Frank Wilkie (2024–present)

== Election results ==
=== 2024 ===
2024 Queensland local elections: Noosa
Party	Candidate	Votes	%	±%
Independent	Amelia Lorenston (elected)	17,494	9.11	
Independent	Jess Phillips (elected)	17,416	9.07	
Independent Labor	Nicola Wilson (elected)	17,159	8.94	
Independent Labor	Brian Stockwell (elected)	15,685	8.17	
Independent	Tom Wegener (elected)	15,584	8.12	
Independent	Karen Finzel (elected)	15,248	7.94	
Independent LNP	Alecia Staines	15,120	7.88	
Independent LNP	Leigh McCready	15,096	7.86	
Independent	Finoa Jacobs	14,353	7.48	
Independent	Joe Jurisevic	14,275	7.43	
Independent	Chris Darwen	11,420	5.95	
Independent	Mat Bankes	8,467	4.41	
Independent	Andrea Newland	8,289	4.32	
Independent	Michelle Ngatai-Stokes	6,394	3.33	
Turnout		35,633		

== Culture ==
The Noosa Film Festival was held in Noosa between 2 and 8 September in 1999. A number of other festivals are also held in Noosa, including the Noosa Festival of Surfing.

Noosa Arts Theatre is a hub for performing arts in the area, as well as hosting various food and cultural festivals. Each year Noosa hosts the Noosa Long Weekend Festival, a 10-day and night multi-arts genre cultural festival. Theatre, dance, music, food, film, supper clubs, workshops and more are featured as part of the program that includes free and ticketed events. The festival attracts over 10,000 people each year.

The recently developed J Centre in Noosa Heads has become another venue for live theatre and musical performances, as well as a secondary campus for the University of the Sunshine Coast.

The Noosa Country Show, established 1909, is a yearly event to showcase the shire's best cattle, horsemen etc. The show is held at the Pomona Showgrounds on the second weekend of every September.

The King of the Mountain is an annual festival and mountain challenge held in Pomona in the third week of July.

Pomona is also home to the Noosa Shire Museum, where European and indigenous history is displayed side by side, and The Majestic Theatre, a performing arts centre for the Noosa Northern Hinterland. An art gallery has been established in the old Pomona Railway Station.

== Services ==
The Shire of Noosa operates libraries in Noosaville and Cooroy. A mobile library service visits the following districts on a weekly schedule: Noosa Heads, Sunrise Beach, Cooran, Federal, Kin Kin, Boreen Point, Peregian Beach and Pomona.

== See also ==
- Noosa Biosphere Reserve
- Noosa Festival of Surfing
- Noosa Triathlon
