= Cooroy, Queensland =

Cooroy
- Town
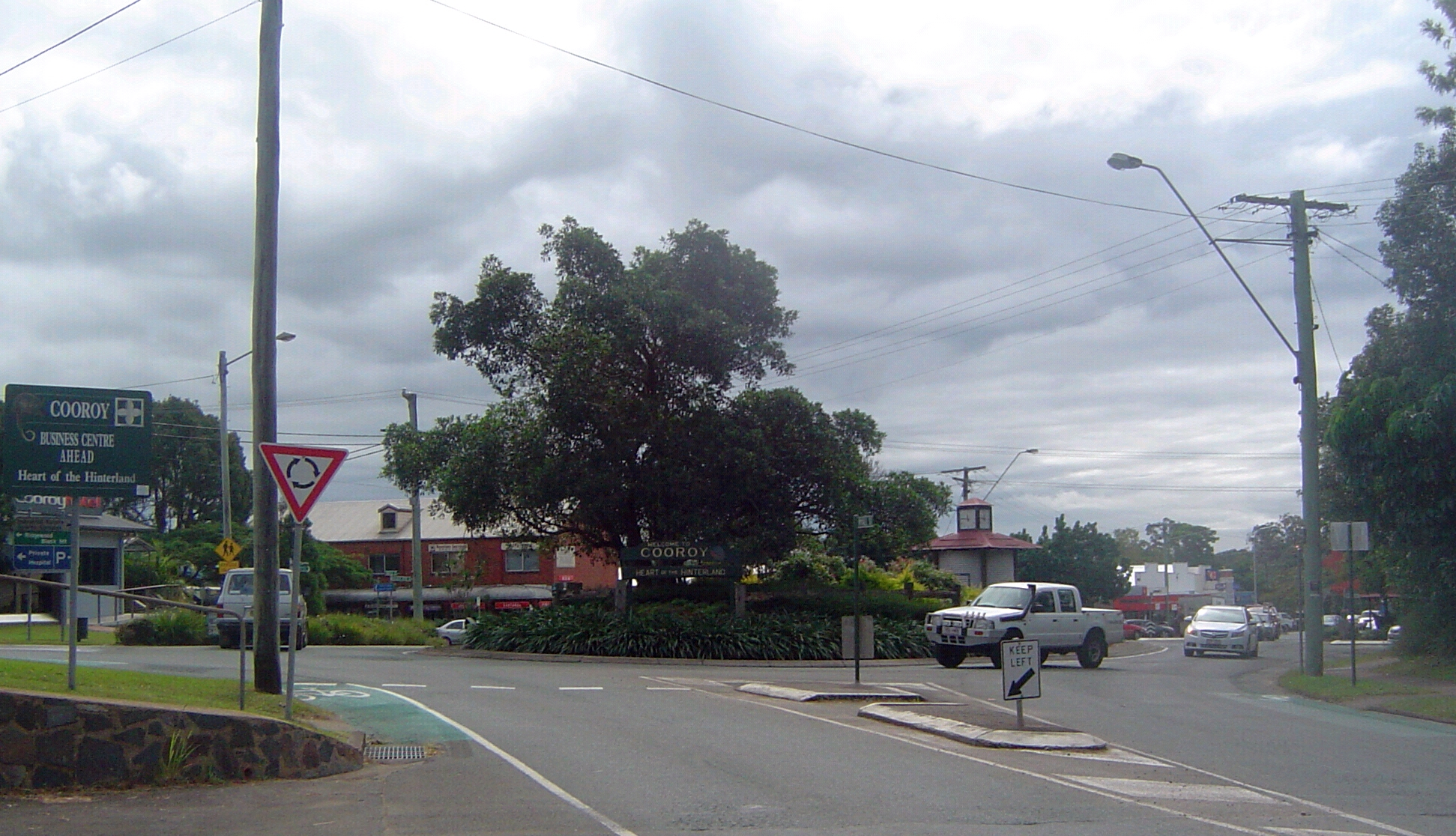
- Myall Street, Cooroy

- Interactive map of Cooroy
- Coordinates: 26.4166°S 152.9119°E
- Country: Australia
- State: Queensland
- City: Sunshine Coast
- LGA: Shire of Noosa
- Location: 12.9 km (8.0 mi) W of Tewantin; 41.5 km (25.8 mi) NNW of Maroochydore; 130 km (81 mi) N of Brisbane; 45.4 km (28.2 mi) SE of Gympie
- Established: 1885

Government
  - State electorates: Nicklin; Noosa
  - Federal division: Wide Bay

Area
  - Total: 27.4 km^{2} (10.6 sq mi)
- Elevation: 116 m (381 ft)

Population
  - Total: 4,801 (2021 census)
  - Density: 175.2/km^{2} (453.8/sq mi)
- Time zone: UTC+10:00 (AEST)
- Postcode: 4563
Localities around Cooroy
Black Mountain	Pomona	Lake MacDonald
Black Mountain	Cooroy	Cooroy Mountain
Ridgewood	Belli Park; Eerwah Vale	Eumundi

Cooroy is a rural town and locality in the Shire of Noosa, Queensland, Australia. In the 2021 census, the locality of Cooroy had a population of 4,801 people.

== Geography ==
Cooroy is inland from the northern Sunshine Coast hinterland about 22 kilometres (14 mi) west of Noosa Heads. The town is in the north-east of the locality. The Bruce Highway runs through the locality from the south-east (Eerwah Vale) to the north-west (Black Mountain), bypassing the town. The Cooroy–Noosa Road exits to the east from the Cooroy Connection Road, which runs north through the town from the Bruce Highway. The North Coast railway line enters the locality from the south-east (Eerwah Vale), passes though the town which is served by Cooroy railway station, and then exits to the north-west (Pomona).

== History ==
Cooroy's name came from Mount Cooroy, which was originally called Coorooey, from an Aboriginal word for possum, kurui.

The area was explored by timber-cutters as early as 1863. Cooroy's main industry developed from timber, having two operating sawmills, into dairying and fruit growing. In 1915, a butter factory opened.

Cooroy railway station was opened in 1891 and in the same year a post office opened. A town survey was conducted in 1907. In April 1908, 131 town lots on either side of the railway station were sold. Most lots were 1/4 acre (0.10 ha).

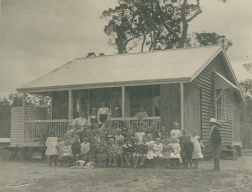
Cooroy State School, 1909

Cooroy State School opened on 18 January 1909 with 18 students under headmaster Robert Thorney Bolton. The school building was 7 by 5 metres (23 by 16 ft) with two verandas and a 1,000 imperial gallons (4,500 L; 1,200 US gal) water tank.

In February 1910, it was proposed to build a Methodist Church at Cooroy. In July 1911, a call for tenders to erect the church was issued. The stump-capping ceremony was held on Thursday 7 September 1911. The church was officially opened on Wednesday 31 January 1912 by Harry Walker, followed by a social evening to celebrate the following day. On 19 February 1949, the current church building opened and the 1911 church building became the church hall, having been relocated to the back of the site. With the amalgamation of the Methodist Church into the Uniting Church in Australia in 1977, it became the Cooroy Uniting Church.

Cooroy West State School opened in 1911. It closed in 1962.

The Anglican Church of the Holy Nativity was dedicated on 21 March 1914 by Archdeacon Henry Le Fanu. That church was destroyed by a cyclone on 19 February 1954. On Sunday 7 November 1954 Archbishop Reginald Halse dedicated the new church.

On 23 January 1961, a secondary department was added to Cooroy State School until the Cooroy State High School was opened as a separate school on 23 January 1963. In 1967, it was renamed Noosa District State High School. In 2007, Cooroora Secondary College at Pomona which was merged into Noosa District State High School, with the Pomona campus being used for the younger students and Cooroy campus being used for the older students.

On 23 April 1983, an estimated 20,000 to 25,000 people came together at the Picnic Racetrack in Cooroy for an Aussie live music extravaganza.

The Noosa Botanic Gardens were opened on the banks of Lake Macdonald near Cooroy in 1990.

In 1991, Noosa Shire Council purchased former Butter Factory buildings for use as a community centre which is now run by Cooroy Future Group as an arts centre.

The town was bisected by the Bruce Highway until a bypass was built in 1994.

Noosa Christian College opened on 28 January 2003 as a primary school with 37 students. In 2007, it expanded to offer secondary classes.

Between 2008 and 2013, Cooroy (and the rest of the Shire of Noosa) was within Sunshine Coast Region.

The Cooroy Library opened in 2010.

The Hinterland Adventure Playground was officially opened in Cooroy on 6 May 2022 by Noosa Shire's mayor Clare Stewart.

West Cooroy National Park was opened on 25 January 2023 on the western and southwestern outskirts of Cooroy.

== Demographics ==
In the 2016 census, the locality of Cooroy had a population of 3,791 people.

In the 2021 census, the locality of Cooroy had a population of 4,801 people.

== Heritage listings ==
Cooroy has a number of heritage-listed sites, including:

- Cooroy Lower Mill Site Kiln, Lower Mill Road
- Cooroy Post Office, 33 Maple Street
- Cooroy railway station, 14 Myall Street

== Education ==
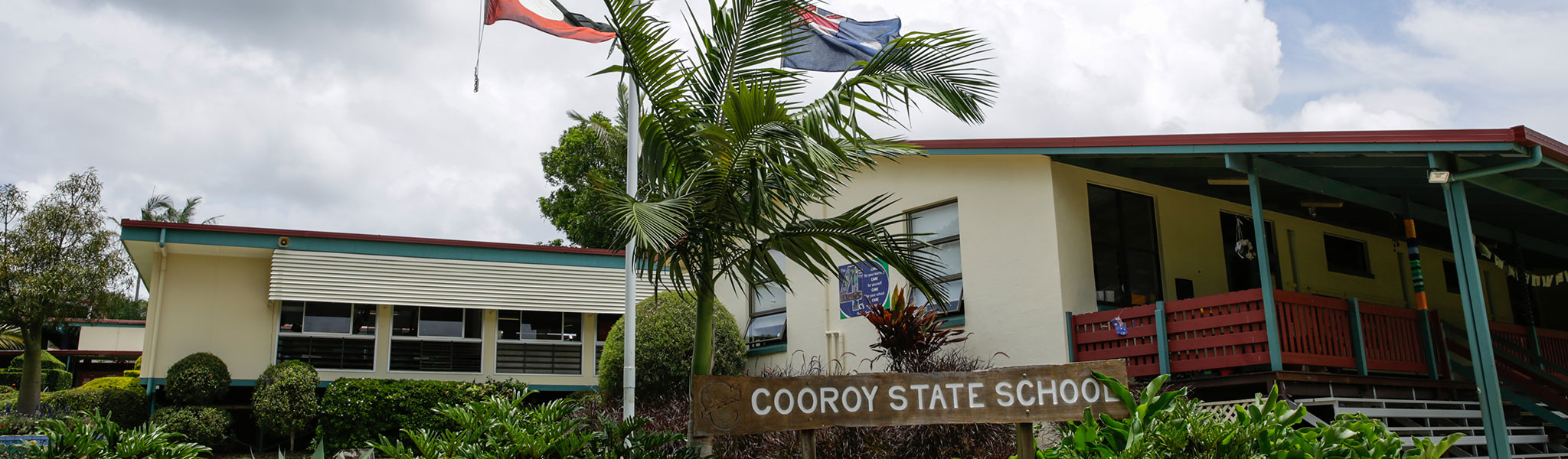
Cooroy State School, 2023

Cooroy State School is a government primary (Prep–6) school for boys and girls at 59 Elm Street (26.4140°S 152.9114°E). In 2016, the school had an enrolment of 545 students with 40 teachers (34 full-time equivalent) and 24 non-teaching staff (15 full-time equivalent). In 2018, the school had an enrolment of 492 students with 39 teachers (32 full-time equivalent) and 30 non-teaching staff (19 full-time equivalent).

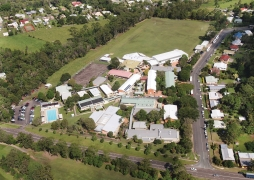
Noosa District State High School (Cooroy campus), 2013

Noosa District State High School is a government secondary (7–12) school for boys and girls at Tulip Street (26.4242°S 152.9102°E). In 2016, the school had a total enrolment of 1,335 students with 111 teachers (106 full-time equivalent) and 48 non-teaching staff (40 full-time equivalent). In 2018, the school had an enrolment of 1274 students with 109 teachers (104 full-time equivalent) and 62 non-teaching staff (45 full-time equivalent).

Noosa Adventist College is a private primary and secondary (Prep–12) school for boys and girls at 20 Cooroy Belli Creek Road (26.4278°S 152.9039°E). It is operated by Adventist Schools Australia. In 2016, the school had an enrolment of 243 students with 21 teachers (19.1 full-time equivalent) and 14 non-teaching staff. In 2018, the school had an enrolment of 252 students with 22 teachers (20 full-time equivalent) and 11 non-teaching staff (7 full-time equivalent).

Cooroy Community Kindergarten (CCK) is at 13–15 Maple Street.

== Amenities ==
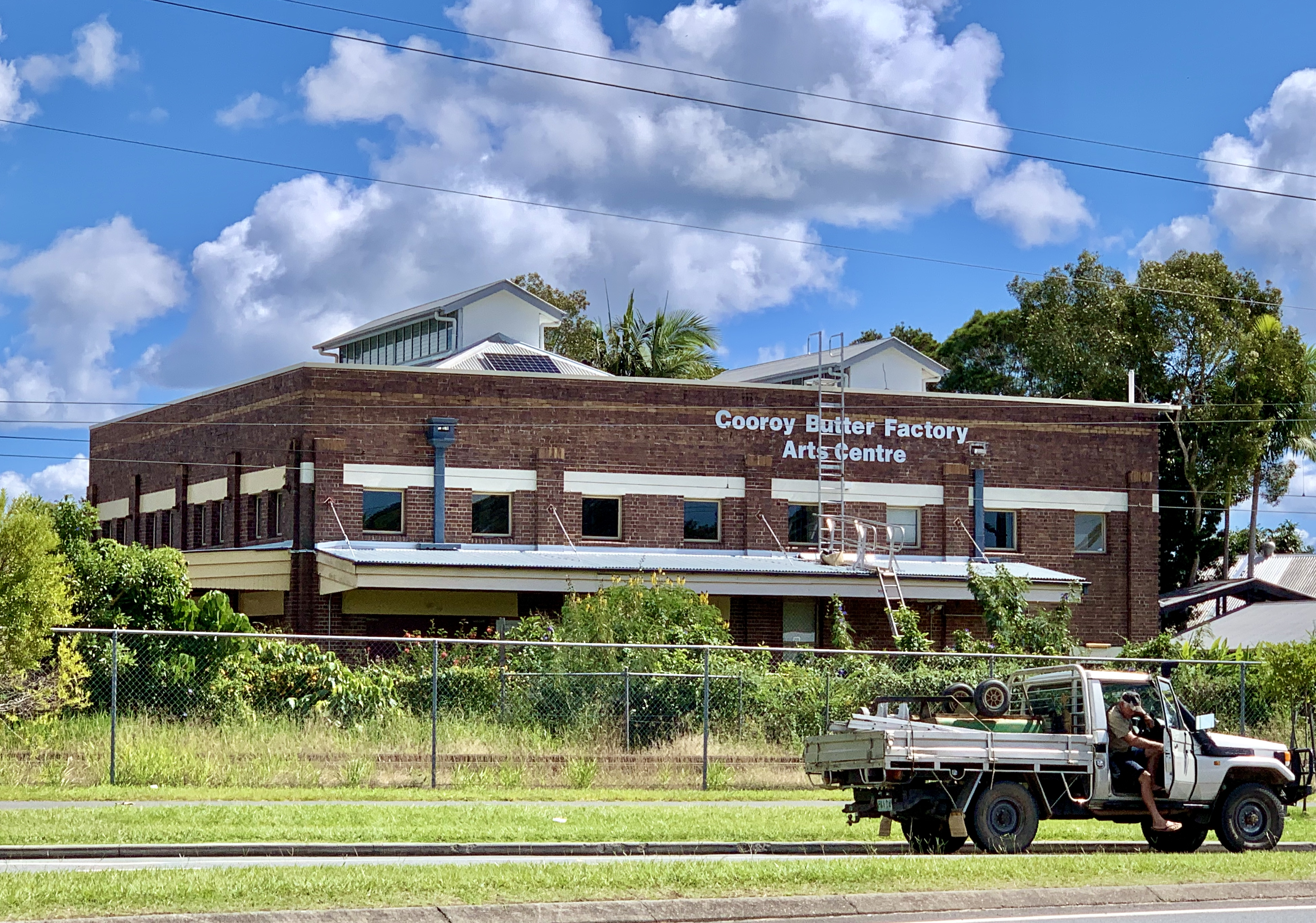
Cooroy Butter Factory Arts Centre

The Shire of Noosa operates a library at 9 Maple Street.

Cooroy Pomona Uniting Church is at 51 Maple Street (26.4204°S 152.9092°E).

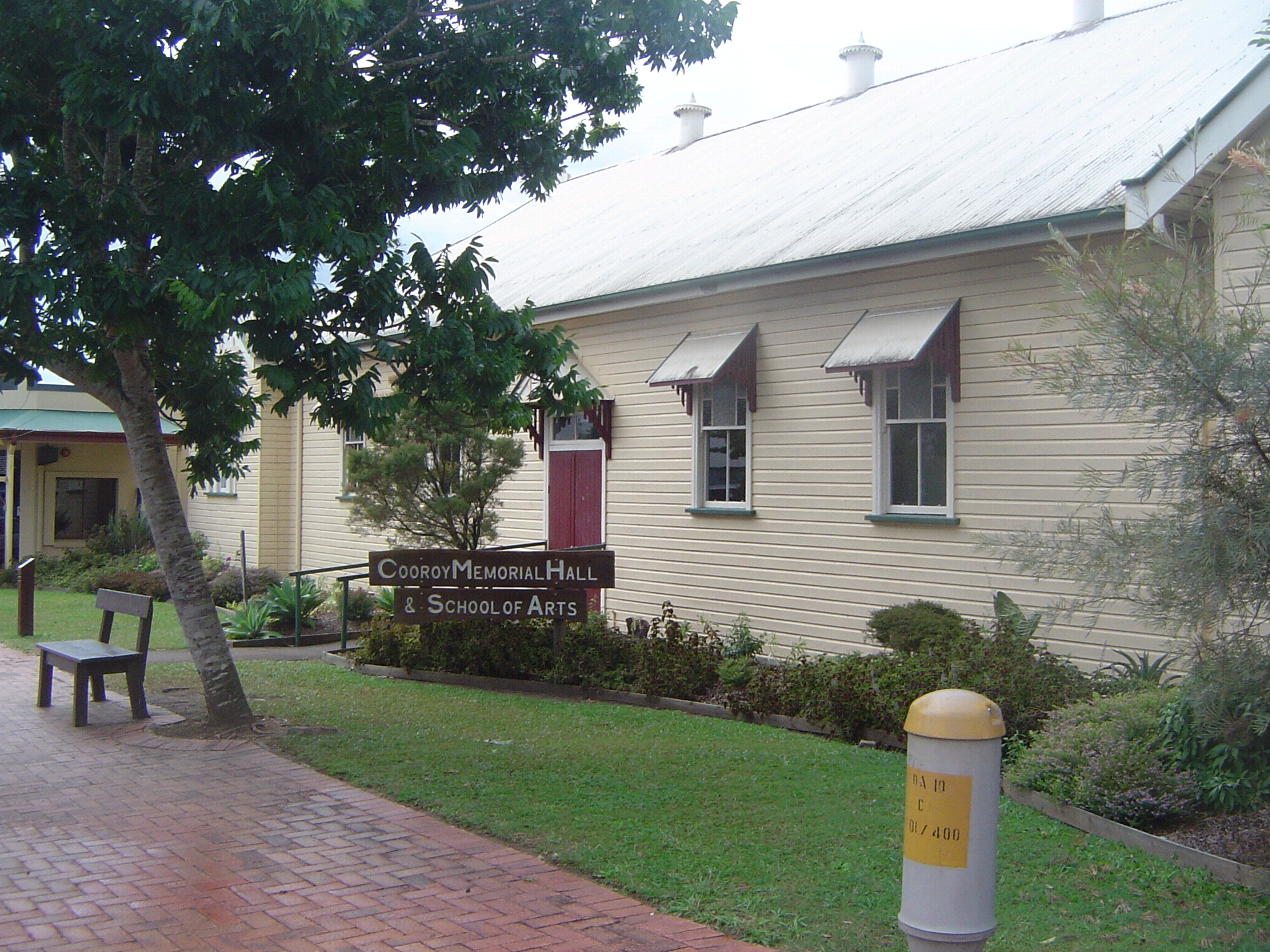
Cooroy Memorial Hall & School of Arts

The Cooroy branch of the Queensland Country Women's Association meets at the Cooroy Memorial Hall & School of Arts at 23 Maple Street.

Cooroy–Pomona RSL Sub-Branch is at 25 Maple Street.

The Hinterland Adventure Playground is in Marara Street (26.4149°S 152.9106°E).

Cooroy Golf Club has an 18-hole golf course at 28 Myall Street. The course extends south along the western side of the railway line.

Cooroy also has a hotel, a police station, a bowls club, the RSL club and sub branch. An overnight RV park has opened at Johnson Park.

== Facilities ==
Cooroy has the following emergency services:

- Cooroy Police Station, 35 Maple Street (26.4191°S 152.9102°E)
- Cooroy Ambulance Station, 41 Kauri Street (26.4162°S 152.9143°E)
- Cooroy Fire Station, 16 Myall Street (26.4204°S 152.9108°E)
- State Emergency Service, 17 Emerald Street (26.4169°S 152.9075°E)

== Transport ==
Cooroy railway station is serviced by two daily Queensland Rail Citytrain network services in each direction and is also used by Queensland Rail Travel's long-distance Traveltrain services; the Spirit of Queensland between Brisbane to Cairns, the Spirit of the Outback between Brisbane to Longreach and the Bundaberg and Rockhampton Tilt Trains.

== Notable residents ==
- Major General John Cantwell, AO, DSC (Retd.) – former Deputy Chief of Army
- Marayke Jonkers – Bronze and Silver medal Paralympic swimmer
