= Pomona Police Station and Court House =

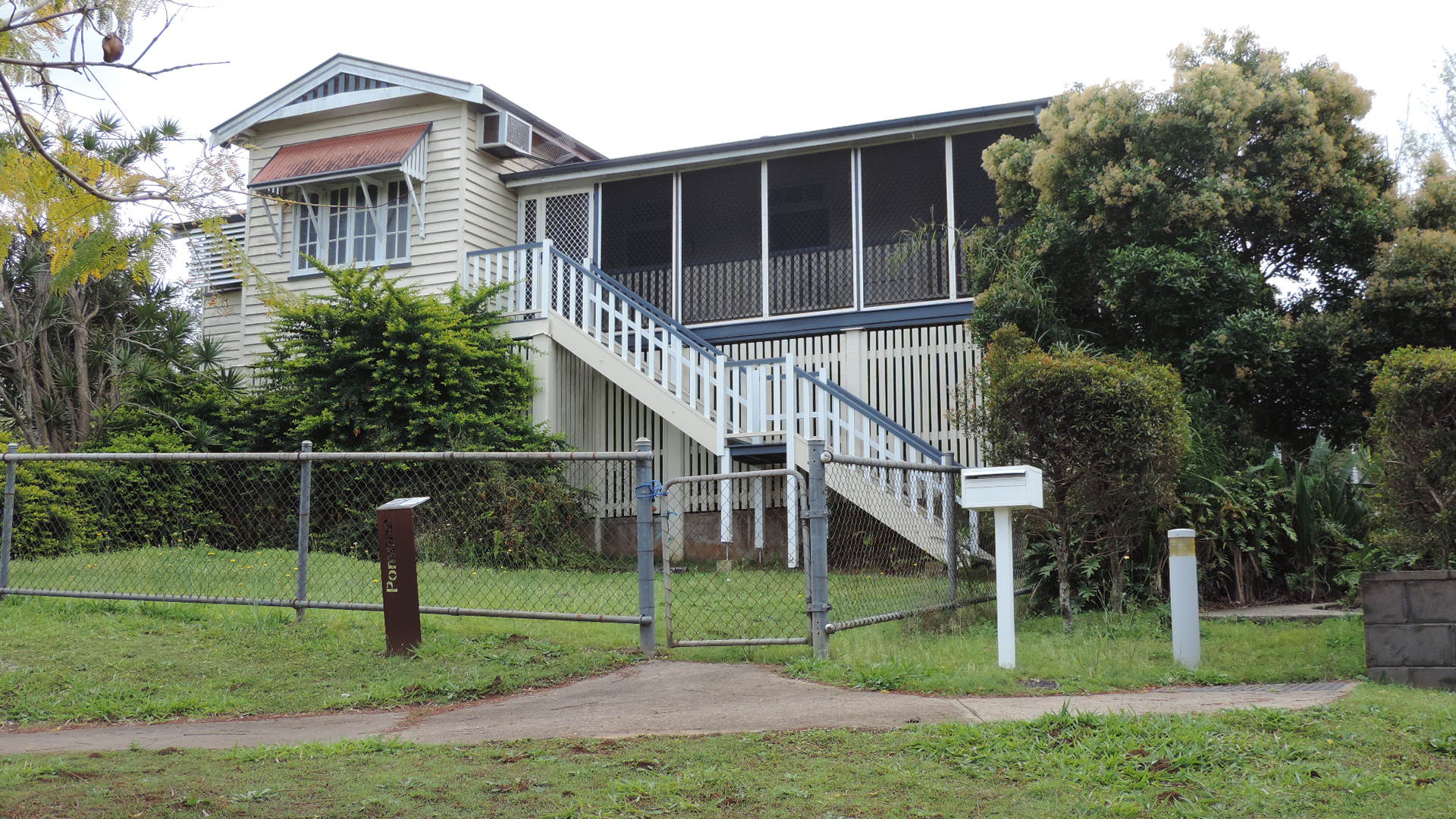
- Former Pomona Police Station (now police residence), 2015

- Location within Queensland Location within Australia
- 26.3634°S 152.8541°E
- Location: Red Street, Pomona, Shire of Noosa, Queensland, Australia

History
- Design period: 1919–1930s (interwar period)
- Built: 1934

Queensland Heritage Register
- Official name: Pomona Police residence (& former station), lock-up and courthouse
- Type: state heritage (built)
- Designated: 27 May 2005
- Reference no.: 602515
- Significant period: 1930s (historical); 1930s (fabric)
- Significant components: police station, toilet block/earth closet/water closet, residential accommodation – police sergeant's house/quarters, lock-up, court house

The Pomona Police Station and Court House is a heritage-listed former police station at Red Street, Pomona, Shire of Noosa, Queensland, Australia. It was built in 1934. It was added to the Queensland Heritage Register on 27 May 2005.

== History ==
The police and court house precinct at Pomona is bounded by Red Street and Rectory Street, and contains three significant 1930s government buildings, all of which are still in use in some form. The close spatial relationship of the wooden police residence (& former station), court house, and lock-up is typical of pre-World War II Queensland police precincts, and the history of the site reflects the history of the Pomona district.

In the 1850s the area was used for cattle runs, but by the 1860s timber getting was a local industry. The Unoccupied Crown Lands Act 1860, and the Crown Land Alienation Acts 1868 aided this process. Access to cheap land assisted the harvesting of kauri, cedar, hoop pine and beech, and hastened closer settlement. The discovery of gold at Gympie by James Nash in 1867 also stimulated development in the district. In 1868, the main road to Gympie ran a couple of miles west of the current Shire, but an alternative route ran through Tewantin, which was surveyed in 1871. The Gympie-Cooran rail link established in 1889 was used to transport timber from the Kin Kin and Pinbarren Scrub areas, and the Eumundi to Cooroy line was built in 1891. The Co-Operative Communities Land Settlement Act 1893 also led to two experimental communities being established in the shire.

Pomona was established to give settlers in the scrublands better access to the 1891 North Coast railway line. Before Pomona was surveyed in 1900, the bend where settlers hailed the train to send their goods to market was called the "Pinbarren siding". As the name Pinbarren was already taken by another settlement, Pomona, the name of the Roman Goddess of fruit, was chosen for the new town. The Pinbarren Provisional School (1897) became the Pomona State School in 1908. The current Noosa Shire was created in 1909, and covers the towns of Cooran, Pomona, Cooroy, Tewantin and Noosa, and the Shire Council office was based in Pomona until 1980.

In the first decade of the 20th century, industry in the area shifted from timber to dairying. In 1907 the Cooroy estate was resumed from a sawmiller, enabling close settlement by New South Wales dairy farmers, and fruit, sugar cane, and maize was also grown. Kin Kin was opened up for dairying after 1904, and trees were cleared for pasture. Until the establishment of a butter factory at Kin Kin (1912–1937), cream was sent by road to Cooran, and then by rail to Gympie's butter factory, established in 1898. Butter factories were also opened at Cooroy in 1915 (closed 1976), and at Pomona in 1919 (closed 1970).

However, bananas were also an important crop in the Shire after 1908, peaking in the 1920s before being decimated by "Bunchy Top" disease in the 1930s. With the decline of banana growing, dairying was the main industry in the Noosa Shire from the 1930s to the 1960s, when competition from margarine, the loss of butter markets, and pasture decline saw dairying replaced by beef cattle. By the 1990s, Pomona was relying on fruit and furniture manufacture for its livelihood.

As the district developed and evolved, so too did the system of policing in Queensland. The Police Act 1863 centralised the system under a Police Commissioner, and in 1864 the Victorian model was applied to the police force. The ranks of Chief, District and Mounted Constables were replaced with those of Inspector, Sub-Inspector, Sergeant and Constable. The Police Department was a sub-department of the Home Secretary until its 1952 move to the Health and Home Affairs portfolio. It was shifted around in the 1950s and 1960s, until the Police Act 1970 created a separate Police Department.

The police commissioner at the time the first police station was established in Pomona (1927) was William H. Ryan (January 1925 to May 1934), and he appears to have also pushed for the building of the 1934 Police Station and court house. During the building of the latter in late 1934, Cecil James Carroll was Commissioner (May 1934 to July 1949). Carroll reorganised the police force, and increased its numbers, efficiency and morale.

Pomona had been agitating for a police station since at least 1910. In February of that year, the manager of the Commercial Bank of Australia at Pomona wrote to the Home Secretary complaining that the nearest police officer was in Tewantin. The two banks at Pomona were the only permanent banks between Emundi and Gympie, and held £2000 in cash between them. Also in February 1910, Eugene Von Blanckensee, a carpenter and local Justice of the Peace, wrote that Pomona needed a police station. The only response was that the town was visited by an officer from Nambour each Monday, and by one from Gympie each Thursday. Police Commissioner William G. Cahill (April 1905 to December 1916) did not act on the recommendation of Maryborough District Inspector Marrett to temporarily station an officer at Pomona until a station was built at Cooroy. Marrett had recommended a police station in Cooroy in December 1909, giving as a reason the rapid development of the area in the preceding two years.

Pomona was persistent, however. In June 1910 a Pomona delegation consisting of A.P. Curran, J.W Napier, and J.J. Wilkinson travelled to Brisbane to see John Appel, the Home Secretary, to press their case for a police station. In July 1910 Maryborough District Inspector P. Short reported that Pomona's location was roughly halfway between Cooroy and Cooran, and halfway between Gympie and Nambour, and that it was 12 miles (19 km) from nearest policeman at Tewantin. Short noted that the Noosa Shire's population was rapidly increasing due to timber getting, and the influx of settlers and their labour; that undesirables were also passing through Pomona on their way to Gympie; and that Pomona had two banks, two butchers, two stores, a hotel, a state school and a newspaper. Short offered several potential central sites in Pomona for a police station.

However, although both Cooran and Cooroy had police stations by 1920, Pomona was still lacking. In November 1926, Maryborough District Inspector J. Mann recommended a station at Pomona, and Commissioner Ryan visited Cooran and Pomona on 15 April 1927. On 22 April 1927 Constable Howie from Cooran reported that a Mr Blanckensee was willing to build a house for the police in return for a 3-year lease. He needed 3 months notice to build it, and could rent it to the police for 27 shillings and 6p per week (by June the price was 30 shillings). The offer would stand to 1 August 1927.

The Police Commissioner recommended this offer to the Home Secretary in June 1927. On 9 July 1927, Pomona residents became indignant when the Co-op Stores and Hanlon's Store were broken into, and this may have prompted the police to accept Blanckensee's offer on 23 July 1927. Blanckensee built a four-room house with kitchen, bathroom and front and back verandas, along with a stable and feed-room, on his 34.6 perches (880 m^{2}) of land at Sub 32 of allotments 1 and 2, Section 3. The house still stands behind the current police precinct, at 1 Railway Parade.

On 3 September 1927 the vacancy for an officer at Pomona was advertised in the Police Gazette, and the new police station was rented from 1 October 1927, in the name of Ivy Elizabeth Von Blanckensee, for 30 Shillings per week. On 10 October 1927 a Short Lee-Enfield rifle and revolver, baton, tools, horse tack, a lantern, pouches and other equipment was requisitioned for the Pomona Police Station, opened on 3 November 1927 by Constable Harry England Brown (stationed at Pomona until 1932).

On 27 May 1927, the Noosa Advocate reported a visit to the area by Attorney General John Mullan and Undersecretary to the Department of Justice, G. Carter. They were deciding on a site for a Court of Petty Sessions in the Noosa Shire, and local businessmen promoted Pomona as a central location in the butter, timber and banana producing area. Both Pomona and Cooroy had lobbied for a court in 1915. In December 1927 Constable Brown wrote that since Pomona had been appointed by the Governor on 15 December 1927 to hold Courts of Petty Sessions, starting on 2 January 1928, it would need a cell. A removable single-cell lock-up and an earth closet were built by the Department of Public Works on Blanckensee's property by 9 September 1928.

On 11 January 1928 Under Secretary G.A. Carter accepted an offer from the Pomona School of Arts, built in 1926, to permit the Acting Clerk of Petty Sessions (Constable Brown) to use the office attached to the School of Arts. The weekly rent would be 7 shillings and 6p, with free use of the hall for court sessions. By July 1930 Constable Brown was complaining that this arrangement lacked privacy, that a new station and court house was needed, and that the current 30 Shillings per week rent for Blanckensee's house was too high.

In August 1930 Commissioner Ryan recommended the idea of a new station and court house to the Home Secretary, given that Pomona was at the centre of the Cooroy, Cooran and Tewantin Divisions, and that the Court of Petty Sessions was held there. Since January 1928, 63 people had been arrested at Cooran, Cooroy, Tewantin, and Pomona, and 24 Police summons cases had been dealt with. Ryan stated that Pomona was important as a farming and dairying centre, and suggested building on the Police Reserve at Pomona. However, in October 1930 the Blanckensee lease was instead renewed for 3 years, at the reduced rate of 27 shillings and 6p; the amount first suggested by Blanckensee in April 1927.

Brown tried again in December 1932, shortly before Constable Robert H. Sabien, who was to be stationed at Pomona until 1940, replaced him. Brown argued that since the Blanckensee lease would expire in October 1933, a new police station and court house, a second cell, a stable and an earth closet should be built. He mentioned that the earth closet and single cell lock-up from the Blanckensee property could be reused. With regard to his current Court of Petty Sessions office, he stated he had "put up with" a lot of interruptions in the previous 5 years, because of the use of School of Arts hall by community groups during the day. The number of people appearing before Queensland's magistrate's courts fell from 30,000 to 25,000 between 1930 and 1933, only to increase to 35,000 by 1939.

On 26 April 1933 a memorandum to the Under Secretary of the Home Department reported that about 2 and a half roods of suitable land had been found 12 chains (790 ft; 240 m) from the railway station, near the 1927 police station. The owner, L. Horrocks, wanted £100 for it. The memorandum stated that the Police Reserve on the South West of Pomona was 20 chains (1,300 ft; 400 m) from the business centre, which could be a problem when moving "obstreperous" prisoners. By this time the Court of Petty Sessions office at the School of Arts was being provided at no cost to the police.

By October 1933 Blanckensee was only willing to renew the lease on the station for a minimum of 2 years, as he claimed that other tenants were interested. However, the police seem to have gained an extension for a year, since the final lease was set to expire on September 30, 1934.

On 13 June 1934 the Department of Public Works commenced construction of a police station/residence, two-cell lock-up, court house and stable. Three carpenters and one labourer were put on the job, and it was estimated that the work would take about 10 weeks. In the end, work was completed by 31 August 1934, and Blanckensee's house was vacated on 1 September the new police station being occupied the same day. In October 1934 the Department of Public Works gave Police Commissioner Carroll official notice that Job £37537, ordered on 3 April 1934, had been completed at a cost of £1030. This notification seems to only apply to the police station/residence itself, as an identical station was erected at Mitchelton in Brisbane in 1935 for £1221. The court house apparently cost £524.

In July 1932 Assistant Supervising Architect of the Department of Public Works, Harold James Parr had designed the plans for the police station, Type Two, erected at Pomona. Records indicate that sixteen Type Two stations were built in Queensland in the 1930s. The Type Two was high-set, with wooden weatherboards, an office 12 by 11 feet (3.7 by 3.4 m), three bedrooms at 12 by 12 feet (3.7 by 3.7 m), a living room of 16 by 12 feet (4.9 by 3.7 m), and a kitchen of 11 by 12 feet (3.4 by 3.7 m). It came with a stove recess, pantry, bathroom, open 8-foot (2.4 m) verandas on two sides, an enclosed veranda to rear, two 1000-gallon water tanks on stands next to the house, and a laundry under the kitchen.

Pre-World War II police stations commonly combined an office and a residence, especially in rural areas. Accommodation problems had always been rife in the 19th century and early 20th century Queensland Police Force with the Queensland Government being slow to provide money. During the 1930s Great Depression the police were also responsible for distributing unemployed relief, and most stations needed more office space to administer the Intermittent Relief System.

Until 2004, only small changes had been made to the 1934 precinct. In 1940 Constable James Elstob (1940–1942) made a request to garage his private car under the house, noting it would be 39 feet (12 m) from the cells, 66 feet (20 m) from the court house, and 69 feet (21 m) from the stables. In 1951 Sergeant 2/c F.S. Tapsell, (1946–1951) wrote that the buildings had been painted externally, but that the five main rooms of the residence had never been painted internally and were in sore need of it. In 1956 Sergeant 2/c P.H. Gimpel, (1951–1960) requested minor repairs and additions, for example mosquito and frog-proofing of all water tanks, an awning over the back entrance landing of the residence, and repairs to the two earth closets.

Also in 1956, the stationing of a motorcycle outfit in Pomona led to a request by Gimpel to modify the disused stable by enclosing the front of the stable, and adding a door. The bottom portion of the wall at the rear of the stable would have to be removed, a double door erected, and a concrete floor laid.

In 1965 and 1967 Senior Constable Alan Walker (1964–67) requested a septic system, and in 1968 this request was repeated by Senior Constable Luis Olsen (1968–73), who also asked that the back entrance landing be enclosed, as well as part of east veranda, where rain was beating against the doors into the main bedroom and the lounge.

Pomona was a two-man station between 1949 and 1963, and there was a second police residence somewhere in Pomona. A 1963 report on staffing at Pomona by the Maryborough Inspectors Office said that one officer had managed the station for 10 months between mid 1961 and the end of 1962 and that it was possible to reduce Pomona to a one-man station again, especially since the new Bruce Highway had bypassed Pomona in December 1962. The report also noted that Courts of Petty sessions were held at Pomona for the Police divisions of Pomona, Cooran, Cooroy and Tewantin. A Stipendiary Magistrate was stationed at Gympie, and visited when required. In 1987 the Magistrates Court moved to Noosa Heads, and the lock-up ceased its role around that time. It is now a Registered Property Point for police storage.

The court house is still in use 3 days per week (Tuesday to Thursday), and the Pomona Court Registrar handles civil matters such as small claims, minor debt claims and claims, pre-trail hearings and payment of court fines as well as other general government matters including Registrar-General work and business name applications. Most work is done through the mail. In 2001 the court had a civil jurisdiction of 12000 people, in Cooran, Cooroy, Kin Kin, Pinbarren, and Pomona.

In 1963 Sergeant G. Williams (1961–1963) had requested a lowset office, as the steps up to the 1934 station's office posed a problem for the elderly and the drunk. However, it wasn't until 2004 that construction began on a new lowset concrete block police station, between the old station and the court house.

== Description ==
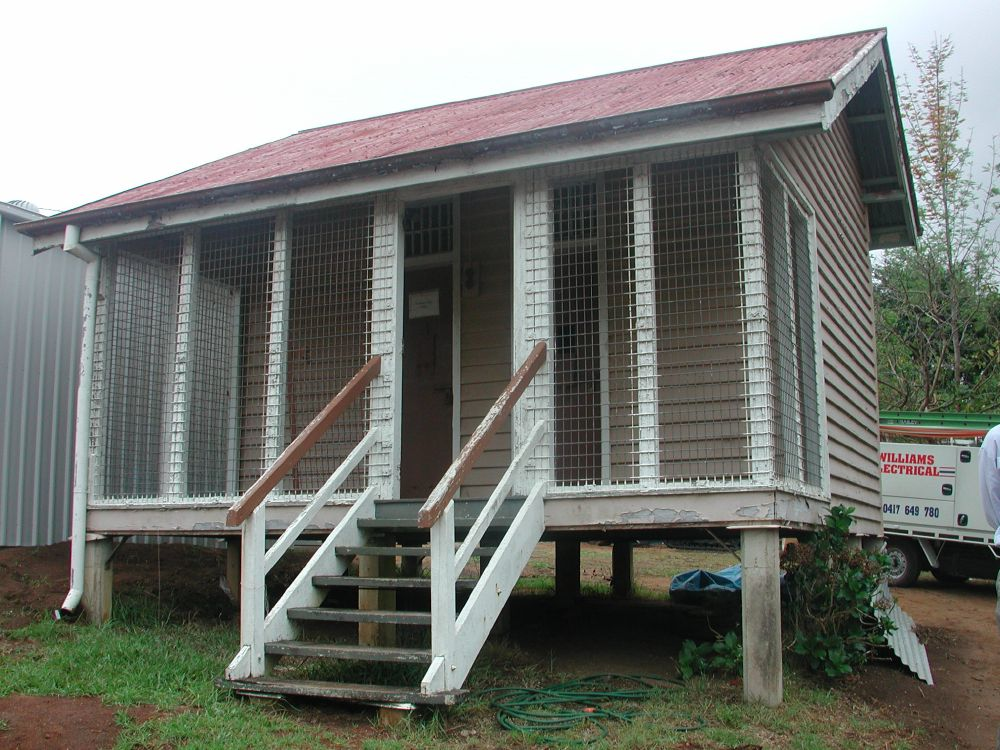
Police lock-up

The Pomona Police and Court House precinct, Lot 4, P50113, covers 3297 square metres and currently contains ten structures and an impound yard. The rectangular court house fronts Red Street, and further west the police residence (& former station) also fronts Red Street, with a side path to the office entering from Rectory Street. A new concrete block police station has been constructed between these two buildings. The 1934 lock-up lies behind the 1934 station, to the north.

The lowset weatherboard lock-up, of standard government design, consists of two cells, an oversail veranda enclosed by a steel grill, and a galvanized corrugated steel roof with lead head nails. The lock- up stands on concrete stumps. The cells have steel doors and observation ports, with barred windows above the doors, and barred rear windows, and are lined with horizontal, unpainted boards with steel tongue inserts between them. The exterior is painted a standard government colour. Judging from its construction it is possible that it pre-dates 1934, and that it was relocated to the Pomona site.

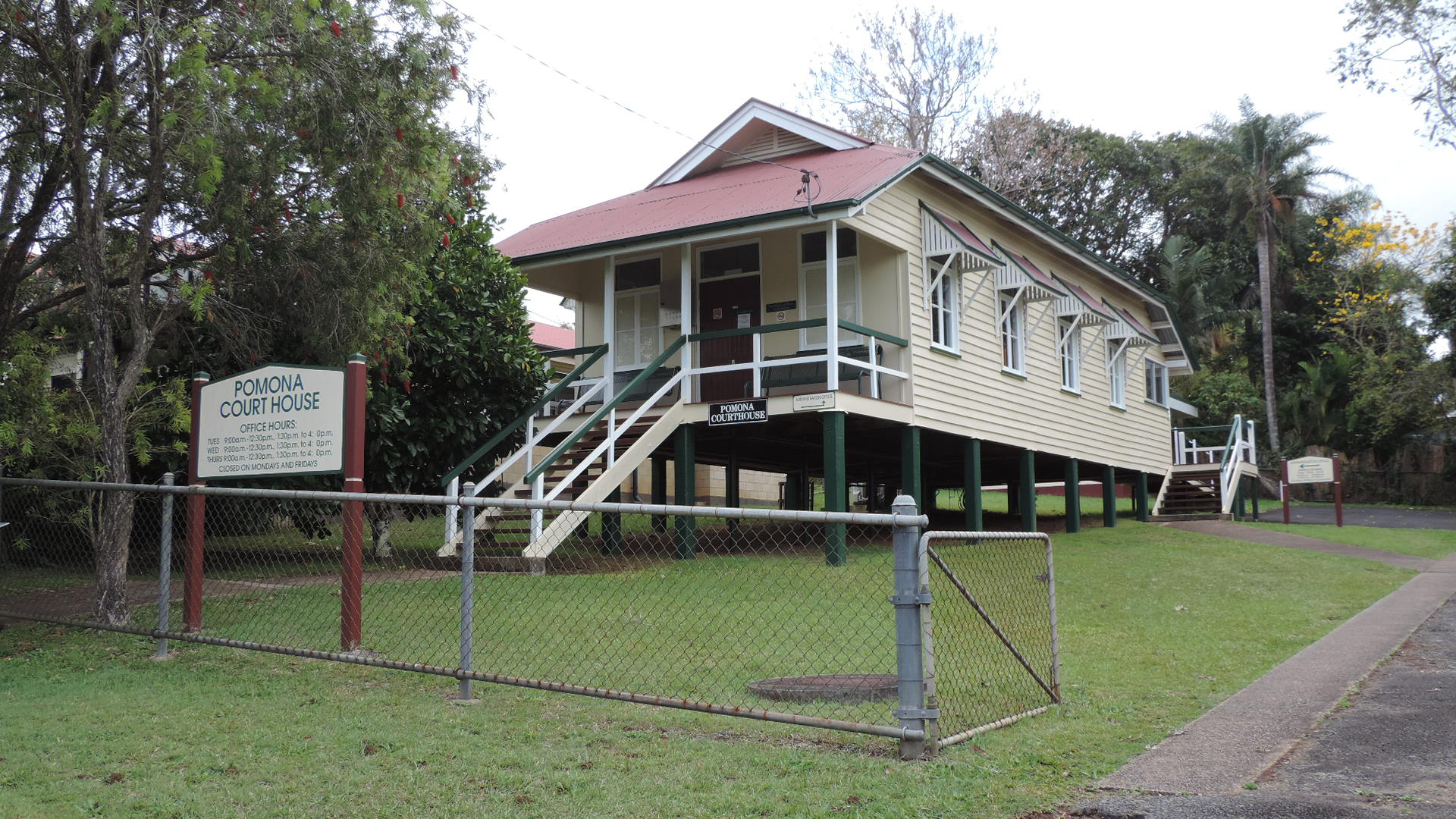
Pomona Court House, 2015

The court house is highset and clad in weatherboard, standing on concrete perimeter stumps and tubular steel centre stumps. It has timber framed window hoods clad with corrugated steel, over glass louvres, and casement windows, which have been painted white for privacy. It has vented gable ends, front and rear, with fixed louvres at the apex. Its eves are unlined, with a ventilation gap at the top of the walls. It has a wooden access ramp leading to the office at the rear of the court house, and a front veranda. Its interior is clad in vertical board, and the courtroom contains the original wooden magistrates bench, witness stand and dock. A small storage room is at the back of the courtroom.

The 1934 police residence is also clad in weatherboard and highset on concrete perimeter posts, with the same window hoods and casement windows as the court house. Its L-shaped veranda has been enclosed. A front gable contains the office, reached by side stairs leading to projecting gabled portico. A rear gable contains the kitchen. The original design contained three bedrooms and a living room, and an enclosed veranda with sliding sashes between the kitchen and bathroom at the rear of the house, but we were unable to inspect the current interior. Front and rear stairs rise parallel to the house, leading to the front veranda and rear door, respectively. Externally, apart from the enclosed verandas, the removal of the 1000-gallon water tanks, and the angle of the stairs to the office, it closely resembles the original 1932 architect's plans.

There is an unused weatherboard Earth Closet east of the lock-up. In addition there is a weatherboard shed facing Rectory Street, which is possibly the old stable that was recommended for conversion to motorcycle storage around 1956, although locals suggest that the stable was a different structure, now removed. The current shed has a casement/sash window facing the street, a single pitch skillion roof, and is timber framed and lined, with a double wooden door to the rear, and a recent roller door. Half of the shed stands on concrete stumps, with half constructed on a concrete slab.

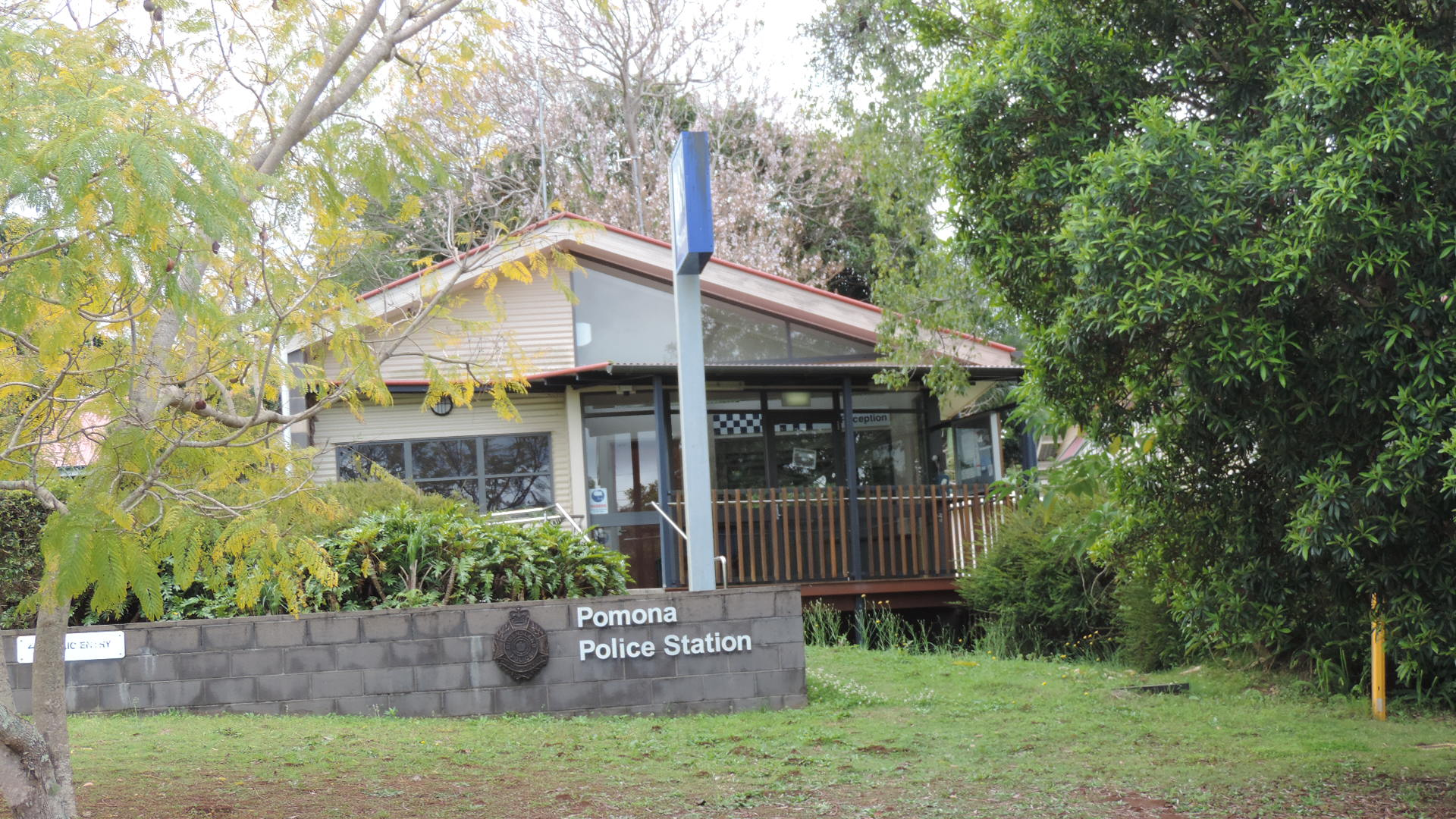
Modern Pomona Police Station, 2015

Vegetation on the property includes two large palm trees and one smaller palm in front of the 1934 police residence, and a bottle tree in front of the 1934 court house. A tubular pipe fence with wire mesh runs around the property, although sections have been removed from in front of the new station building, and a construction entrance off Rectory Street.

The new concrete block police station, the concrete block toilets behind the court house, the old chicken-pen of recycled timber and corrugated iron (1980s) to the east of the impound yard, the new aluminium shed to the west of the lock-up, and the small garage facing Rectory Street, south of weatherboarded shed mentioned above, are not of cultural heritage significance.

== Heritage listing ==
The Pomona Police residence (& former station), lock-up and court house were listed on the Queensland Heritage Register on 27 May 2005 having satisfied the following criteria.

The place is important in demonstrating the evolution or pattern of Queensland's history.

The place illustrates the relationship between the evolution of the site and the history of the development of the Pomona township and the Noosa Shire. The changes to the site also reflect changes within Police and Justice Department policies and practices. In addition, the site illustrates the use of standard building types developed by the Department of Public Works as an economical means to build symbols of "law and order" in developing townships.

The place is important in demonstrating the principal characteristics of a particular class of cultural places.

This grouping of three government buildings, built in the same year, on the same site, is important in demonstrating the principle characteristics of, and is a substantially intact example of, a small town police station / court house group, and the work of the Department of Public Works, including the development of various building "types".

The place is important because of its aesthetic significance.

As a substantially intact 1930s police station / court house group, the site is evocative of a past era of law enforcement in a small country town. The buildings including the police residence (& former station), court house and lock-up, although of modest intentions, are a good example of this type of work undertaken by the Department of Public Works, including attention to the requirements of the subtropical climate. The Interior of the court house (particularly the courtroom) is substantially intact and includes purpose built court house furniture for the courtroom, office, and verandahs.

The place has a strong or special association with a particular community or cultural group for social, cultural or spiritual reasons.

The precinct has a strong, ongoing association with the local community. Pomona went through a determined process of lobbying for a police station, and the precinct has played, and continues to play, its role of providing the essential functions of law and justice.
