= Noosa District State High School – Pomona Campus =

- Cooroora Secondary College badge, 2000-2007

Location
- 120 Summit Road, Pomona, Queensland
- 26.352664°S 152.8634922°E

Information
- Former names: Pomona State School – Secondary Department (1945–70); Pomona High School (1970–2000); Cooroora Secondary College (2000–07)
- Type: State high school
- Motto: Industria Vincit Omnia
- Established: 1945–1996 (Secondary department); 1 July 1996; 30 years ago
- Principal: Stacy Wilmore
- Head of Campus: Oliver Colmer
- Grades: 7 to 8
- Enrollment: 377; (2023)
- Colors: Green and white
- Mascot: Possum
- Yearbook: Yali
- Affiliation: Noosa District State High School
- Website: noosadistrictshs.eq.edu.au

Noosa District State High School – Pomona Campus (Note: Formerly Pomona State School – Secondary Department (1945–1970), Pomona High School (1970–2000), and Cooroora Secondary College (2000–2007)) is a high school based in Pomona in the Shire of Noosa, Queensland, Australia. It is the junior campus of Noosa District State High School.

== History ==
On 24 October 1925, the Pomona State School committee unanimously voted to develop the Noosa Shire's first Rural School. However, this did not eventuate until 1935 due to fundraising issues and the Great Depression. The school was established next to the state school and opened by Frank Arthur Cooper on 26 October 1935. In 1944, the Rural School was upgraded to a secondary department to take sub-junior students, which commenced at the start of the 1945 school year. It was the first public secondary department (high school) established in Queensland. In that same year, several regional state schools were closed, with both their students and buildings transferred to Pomona. The school buildings, formed in the shape of a 'U' laid out the high school.

=== Ellis Estate ===
In 1947, a new site for the secondary department was sought, with the Ellis Estate being the preferred option. The site was to the south-East of the town offering a sizeable footprint. In 1970, the newly named Pomona High School was moved to the Ellis Estate, and due to the area available was later joined by the state school in 1976.

=== Golden Jubilee ===
On 22 October 1995, as part of the golden jubilee celebrations of the high school, a joint project with the Cooroy-Pomona Sub-Branch of the Returned and Services League of Australia, the Pomona District School Memorial Forest was rededicated. The site was originally the Pinbarren Creek State School which was closed in 1944 with its school building moved to Pomona and used to create the Pomona High School when it was first established.

=== Summit Road ===
In 1995, the high school relocated to Summit Road onto a 25 hectare parcel of land due to the perceived increase of the student population. Construction began in December 1995 with stage one being completed and the new school opening on 1 July 1996. This allowed for year 9 and 10 students to relocate to the new site. Stage two was completed in May 1997. The campus was designed to cater for 800 students with further planned stages, including a hall, to allow for more students when needed. On 20 September 2000, the Pomona High School was renamed Cooroora Secondary College to match the school badge, Mount Cooroora.

On 25 September 2006, Cooroora Secondary College was made a campus of Noosa District State High School, with year 10 students forcibly transferred to the Cooroy campus from 2 September 2007. On 15 May 2007, a town meeting saw 687 Pomona residents sign a petition to cancel to the transfer of year 10 to Cooroy, cancel the transfer of the school to be under Noosa District State High School and to add years 11 and 12 to the school. Ultimately the town meeting and petition was unsuccessful.

=== Upgrades ===
In June 2023, a A$13 million upgrade of the school featuring a hall as well as 52 new car parks, a fire system upgrade including booster relocation and two holding tanks, and an electrical system upgrade with a pad mount transformer was announced. In June 2023, the hall was completed and opened by Sandy Bolton, Member for Noosa.

== See also ==
- List of schools in Sunshine Coast, Queensland
