= Tuchekoi National Park =

National park in Queensland, Australia

- IUCN category II (national park)
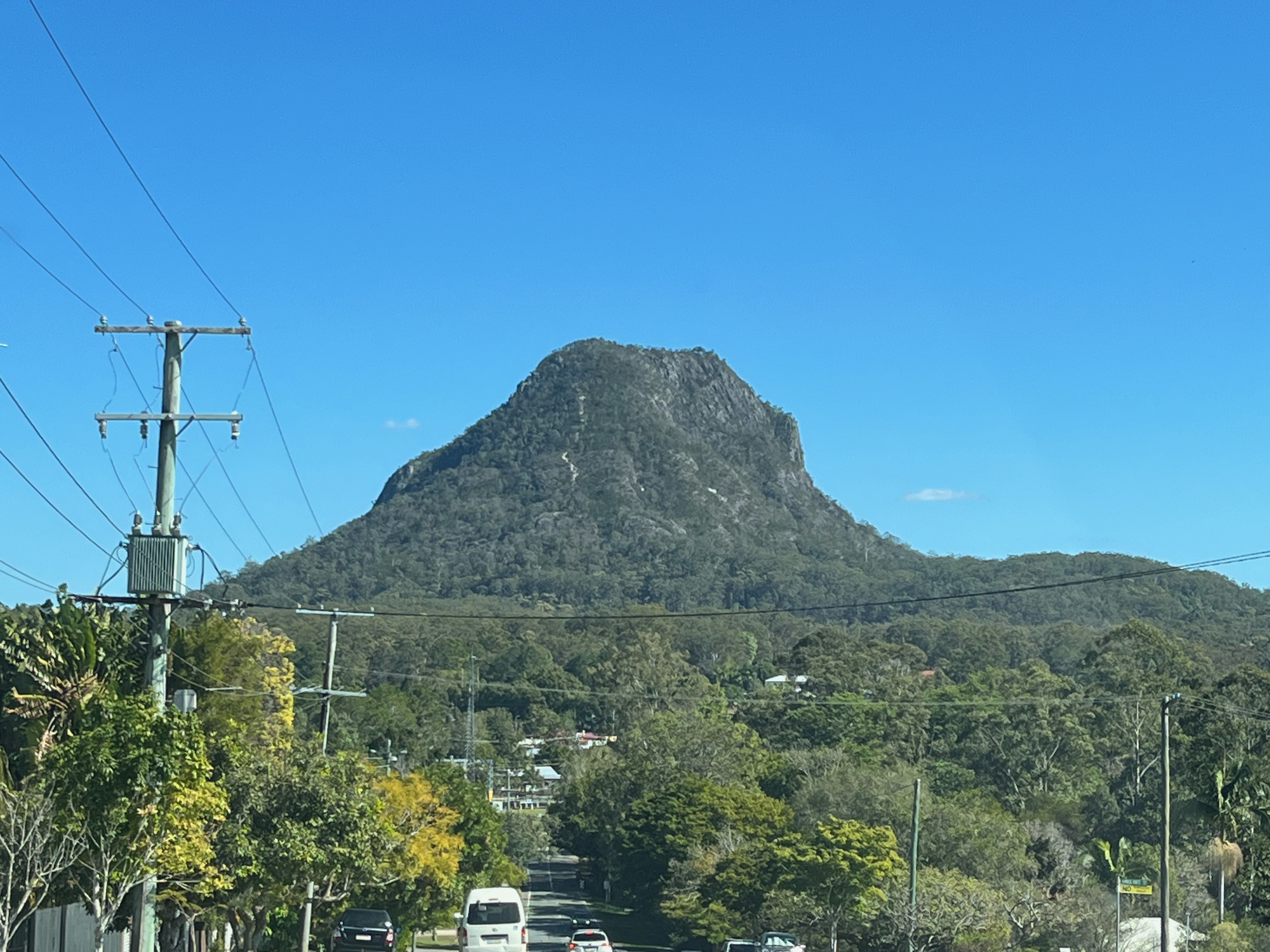
- Mount Cooroora

- Location within Queensland
- Location: Queensland
- Coordinates: 26.3679°S 152.8365°E
- Area: 3.9 km^{2} (1.5 sq mi)
- Established: 2009
- Governing body: Queensland Parks and Wildlife Service
- Website: https://parks.des.qld.gov.au/parks/tuchekoi

Tuchekoi National Park is a national park in Queensland, Australia. It is situated to the west and south-west of Pomona in the Noosa hinterland.

== Geography ==
The Park is approximately 390 hectares of bushland surrounding Mount Cooroora, a 439 metres high intrusive volcanic plug.

== Walking tracks ==
A main walking track leads from the Mount Cooroora Forest Reserve (carpark and picnic area) to the top of Mount Cooroora with several meandering tracks around the east and north sides of the mountain.

== Festival ==
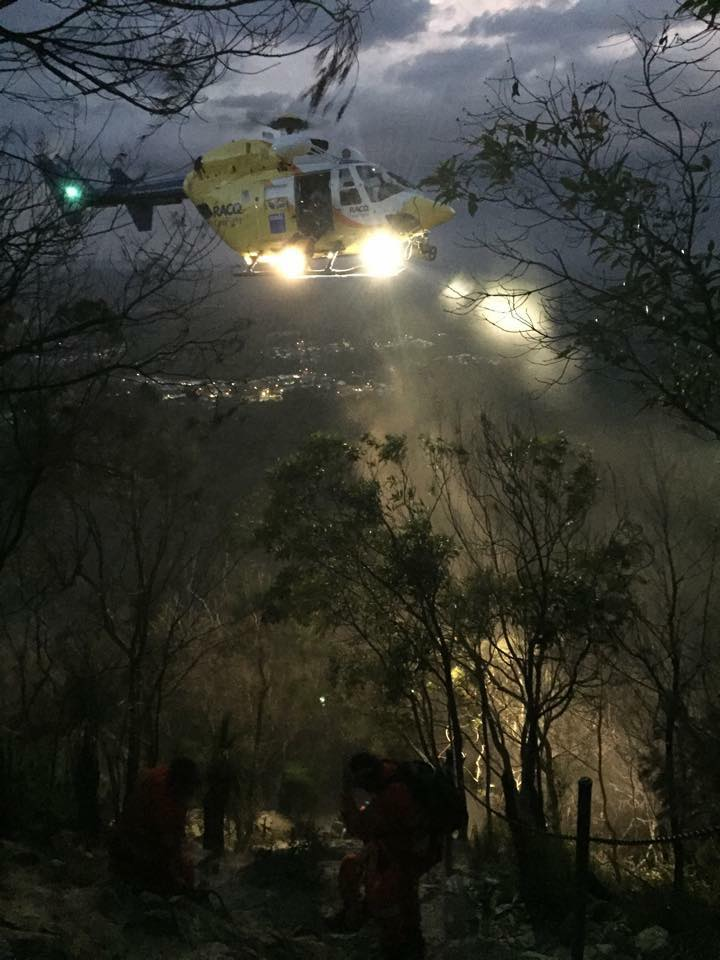
Helicopter rescue from Mount Cooroora during the 2015 King of the Mountain.

Ceasing in July 2023, the annual King of the Mountain festival and race took place, featuring runners racing from the centre of Pomona to the top of Mount Cooroora and back to be named the "King of the Mountain".

Australian band, Midnight Oil, created a theme song for the event when in 1990 they released a single about the race by the same name, King of the Mountain. Although many people think the song is a reference to Peter Brock and the Bathurst 1000 held at Mount Panorama, drummer Rob Hirst confirmed the song is actually inspired by the footrace up Mount Cooroora and the surrounding natural beauty and unique history of the Noosa hinterland.

== See also ==
- Noosa Biosphere Reserve
- Protected areas of Queensland
