= Cooroora Creek Park =

Park in Queensland, Australia

Coordinates: 26°21′49″S 152°51′30″E

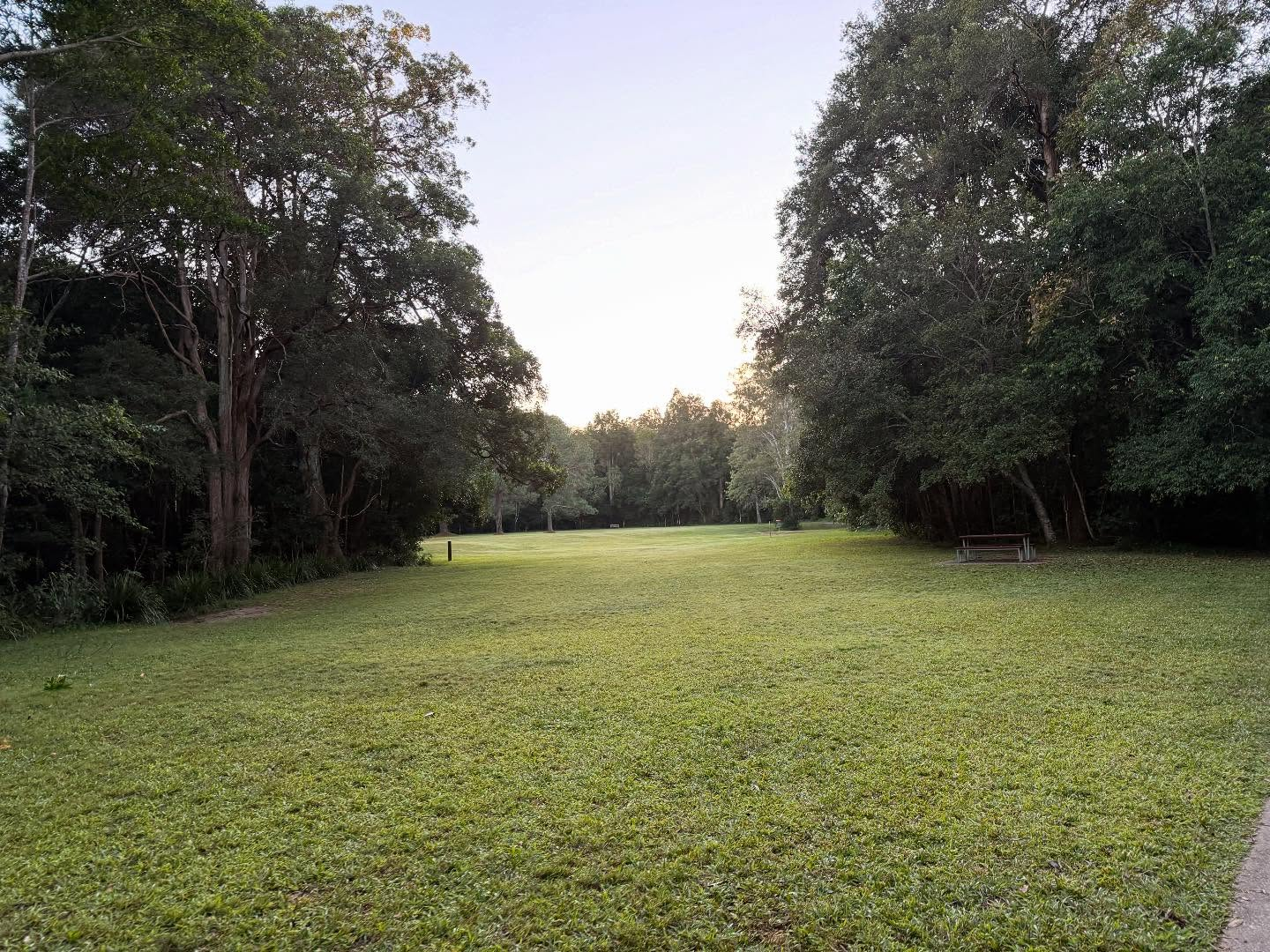
- The first green within the entrance of Cooroora Creek Park.
- Interactive map of Cooroora Creek Park
- Location: Pomona, Queensland, Australia
- Area: 9.72 hectares (24.0 acres)
- Created: 16 April 1988; 38 years ago
- Operator: Noosa Council

Cooroora Creek Park is a park in Pomona, Shire of Noosa, Queensland, Australia. It is located along Cooroora Creek on the eastern side of the centre of Pomona. The Park is used as an off-leash dog park. Several local walks start in the park including the Noosa Trail Network 7 and 8. and the Noosa Biosphere 'Yurol Trail'.

== History ==
The site, originally privately owned was only used as a cattle run due to it being a regular floodplain. In 1988 the site was resumed by the Noosa Council as a result of long standing overdue rates. The site was gazetted as 'Cooroora Creek Park' on 16 April 1988 at 9.12 hectares in size. In the 1993 Noosa Shire Council Draft Recreation and Leisure Strategy, the park was envisaged to include an adventure playground, bike and play facilities and a multi-purpose oval, a car park off Mill Street and entertainment facilities would be part of the public area. None of this ended up coming to fruition with the exception of the carpark that was built on Hill Street adjacent to Cooroora Creek on its west bank.

In March 1998, Noosa and District Landcare Group planted 1,000 trees "to expand riparian corridors" with the assistance of students from the Pomona State School.

On 30 November 1998, a land swap deal with struck between Noosa Council and Page Furnishers resulting in the park total size growing to 9.72053 hectares.

In 2001, the Cooroora Historical Society with the aide of the Noosa and District Landcare Group constructed the Speaking Circle and Reconciliation Stone on the reconciliation island. Further paths were built to link the island with the back of the Noosa Museum.

== Disc golf ==
In 2023, the Australian Flying Disc Association established the park as a permanent 18-tee public-use facility.
