= Pinbarren, Queensland =

Pinbarren
- Town
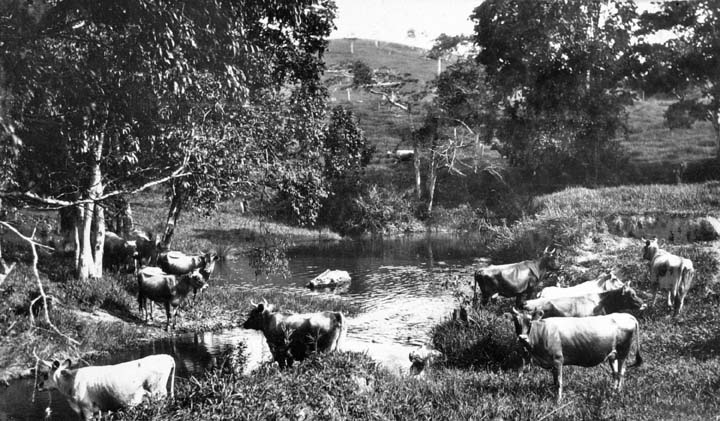
- Jersey Cattle on the banks of Pinbarren Creek, circa 1931

- Interactive map of Pinbarren
- Coordinates: 26.335°S 152.8494°E
- Country: Australia
- State: Queensland
- City: Sunshine Coast
- LGA: Shire of Noosa
- Location: 14.6 km (9.1 mi) NNW of Cooroy; 25.7 km (16.0 mi) NW of Tewantin; 32.9 km (20.4 mi) SE of Gympie; 152 km (94 mi) N of Brisbane
- Established: 1890

Government
  - State electorate: Noosa
  - Federal division: Wide Bay

Area
  - Total: 16.1 km^{2} (6.2 sq mi)

Population
  - Total: 447 (2021 census)
  - Density: 27.76/km^{2} (71.91/sq mi)
- Time zone: UTC+10:00 (AEST)
- Postcode: 4568
Localities around Pinbarren
Kin Kin	Kin Kin	Kin Kin
Cooran	Pinbarren	Cootharaba
Cooran	Pomona	Pomona

Pinbarren is a rural town and locality in the Shire of Noosa, Queensland, Australia. In the 2021 census, the locality of Pinbarren had a population of 447 people.

== Geography ==
Pinbarren is on the Sunshine Coast, 35 kilometres (22 mi) from the centre of Noosa Heads. It is located at the foot of Mount Pinbarren. Its southern boundary is marked by Six Mile Creek.

The town is in the south-west of the locality.

Mount Pinbarren is located in Mount Pinbarren National Park, which was established in 1929.

== History ==
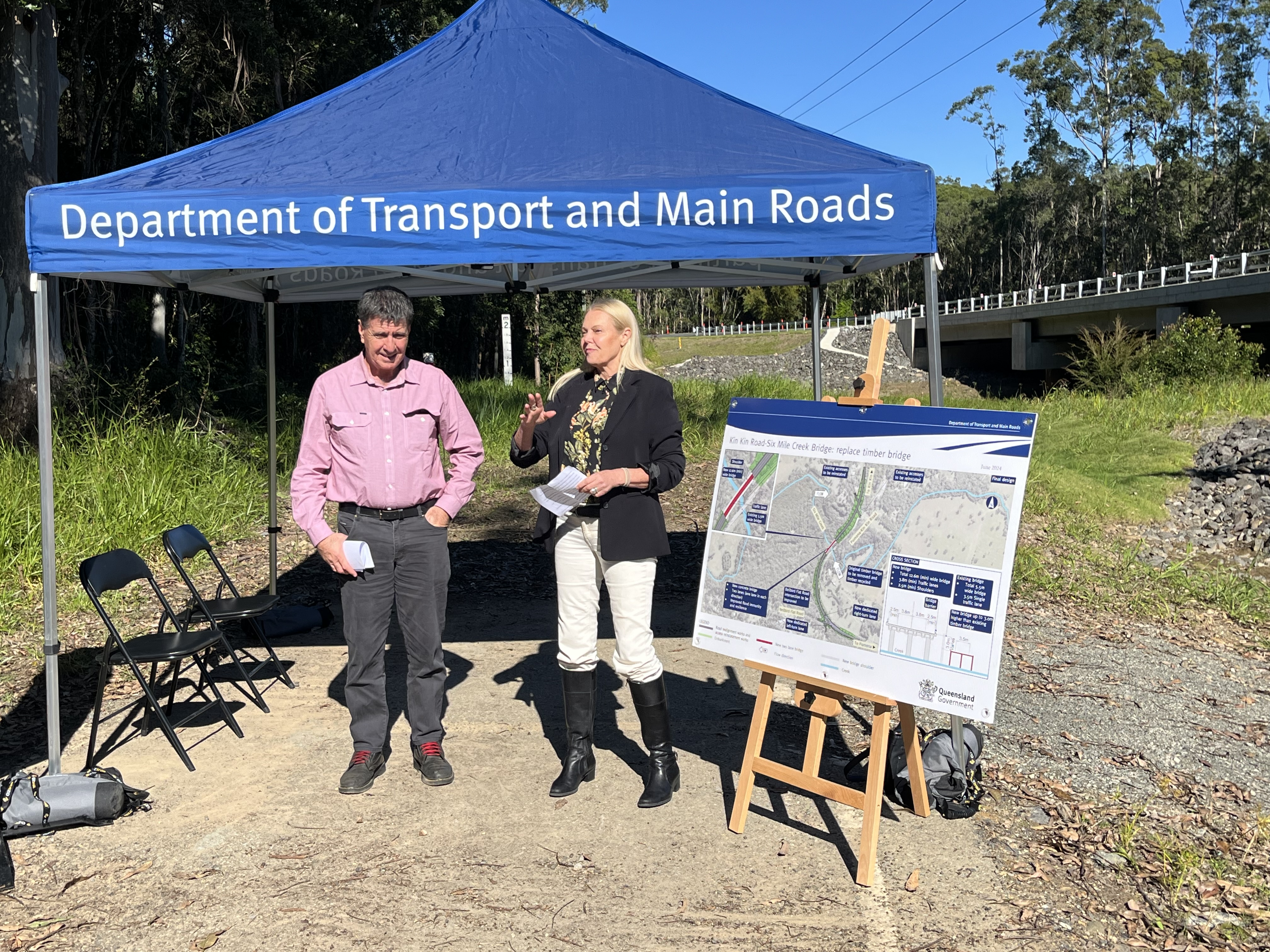
Pinbarren Bridge (Crossing 7), official opening on 3 June 2024.

The name Pinbarren appears to be a corruption of an Aboriginal name Pimperon for the local mountain.

Pinbarren Creek Provisional School opened in 1905. On 1 January 1909, it became Pinbarren Creek State School. The school was closed in 1939. From 1939 to 1943 the Pomona School Forestry Club planted Hoop Pine, Kauri Pine, Flooded Gum and Silky Oak trees on the school site and it was named the Pomona Memorial Forestry Plot on 31 October 1944. A white cross and memorial plaque are present alongside the Pomona-Kin Kin Road. The site was rededicated in 1995 as part of the Pomona High Schools golden jubilee.

Pinbarren Community Christian College opened on 10 February 2003. As at 2023, the school is closed. It was at 298 Pomona Kin-Kin Road.

Between 2008 and 2013, Pinbarren (and the rest of the Shire of Noosa) was within Sunshine Coast Region.

In 2022, work began on the replacement of the Pinbarren Bridge over Six Mile Creek. The work includes a new two lane concrete bridge raised 3 metres for flood mitigation at a cost of $18 Million dollars. This replaces the previous bridge built in 1934 for a price of £2,800. The new bridge was officially opened by Member for Noosa Sandy Bolton and Member for Maryborough Assistant Minister for Train Manufacturing, Regional Development and Jobs Bruce Saunders on 3 June 2024.

== Demographics ==
In the 2016 census, the locality of Pinbarren had a population of 343 people.

In the 2021 census, the locality of Pinbarren had a population of 447 people.

== Education ==
There are no schools in Pinbarren. The nearest government primary schools are Cooran State School in neighbouring Cooran to the west, Kin Kin State School in neighbouring Kin Kin to the north, and Pomona State School in neighbouring Pomona to the south. The nearest government school is Noosa District State High School, which has its junior campus in neighbouring Pomona to the south and its senior campus in Cooroy further south.
