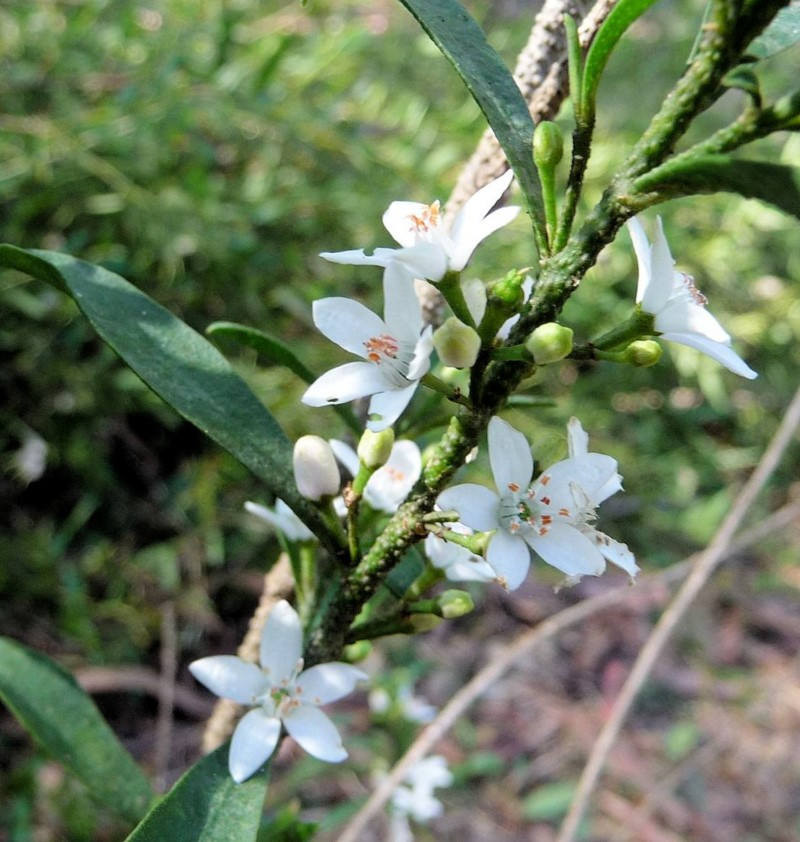
- Near Mount Cooroora

Scientific classification
- Kingdom: Plantae
- Clade: Tracheophytes
- Clade: Angiosperms
- Clade: Eudicots
- Clade: Rosids
- Order: Sapindales
- Family: Rutaceae
- Genus: Philotheca
- Species: P. queenslandica

Binomial name
- Philotheca queenslandica (C.T.White) P.I.Forst.

Synonyms
- Eriostemon myoporoides subsp. queenslandicus (C.T.White) Paul G.Wilson; Eriostemon queenslandicus C.T.White; Eriostemon myoporoides subsp. queenslandica (C.T.White) Bayly

= Philotheca queenslandica =

Species of plant

Philotheca queenslandica is a species of flowering plant in the family Rutaceae and is endemic to south-eastern Queensland. It is a wiry shrub with elliptic to egg-shaped leaves with the narrower end toward the base and densely crowded near the ends of the glandular-warty branchlets, and cream-coloured flowers tinged with pink and arranged singly in leaf axils.

== Description ==
Philotheca queenslandica is a wiry shrub that grows to a height of about 1 m (3 ft 3 in) and has glandular-warty branchlets. The leaves are densely clustered near the ends of the branchlets and are broadly egg-shaped with the narrower end towards the base, 9–30 mm (0.35–1.18 in) long, 1.5–7 mm (0.059–0.276 in) wide. The flowers are arranged singly in leaf axils on a peduncle up to 3 mm (0.12 in) long, each flower on a pedicel 3–6 mm (0.12–0.24 in) long. There are five more or less round sepals and five elliptic to oblong cream-coloured petals 4–10 mm (0.16–0.39 in) long, 1.5–4 mm (0.059–0.157 in) wide and tinged with pink. The ten stamens are hairy with longer hairs near the tip. Flowering occurs sporadically throughout the year and the fruit is 5–8 mm (0.20–0.31 in) long with a short beak.

== Taxonomy and naming ==
This philotheca was first formally described in 1942 by Cyril Tenison White who gave it the name Eriostemon queenslandicus and published the description in the Proceedings of the Royal Society of Queensland. In 2005 Paul Irwin Forster changed the name to Philotheca queenslandica in the journal Austrobaileya.

== Distribution and habitat ==
Philotheca queenslandica grows in wallum heathland in moist or seasonally flooded, boggy or sandy soil. It is found in south-eastern Queensland between Boonooroo and Bribie Island.

== Conservation status ==
Philotheca queenslandica is classified as of "least concern" under the Queensland Government Nature Conservation Act 1992.
