= Pomona, Queensland =

Pomona
- Town
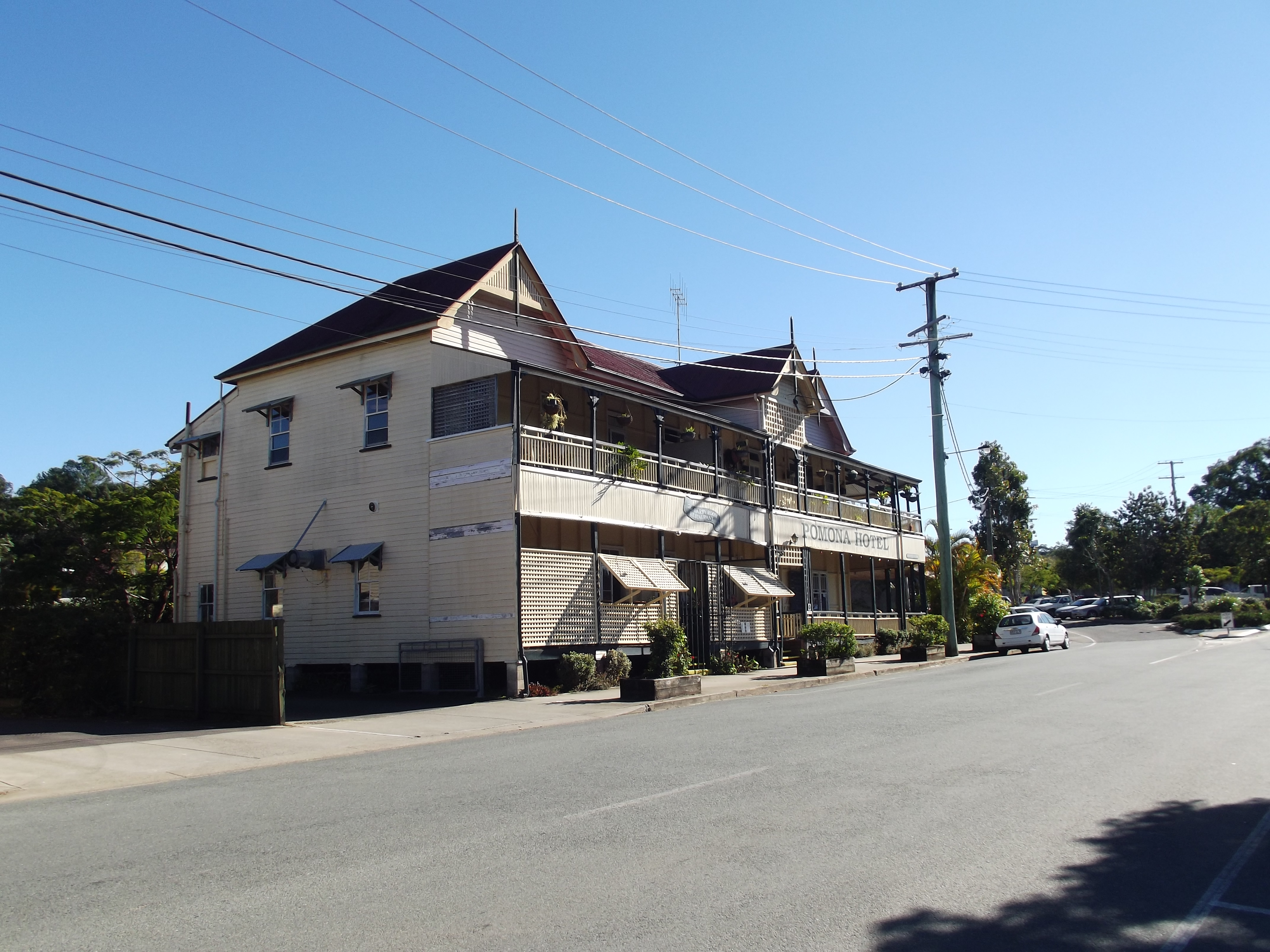
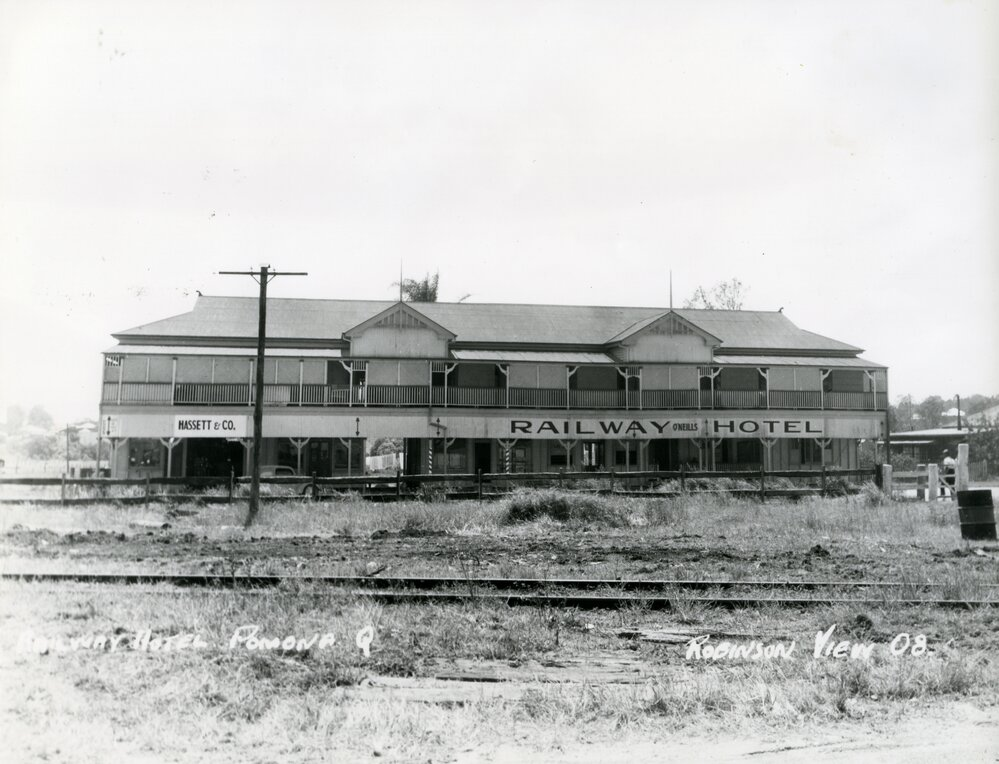
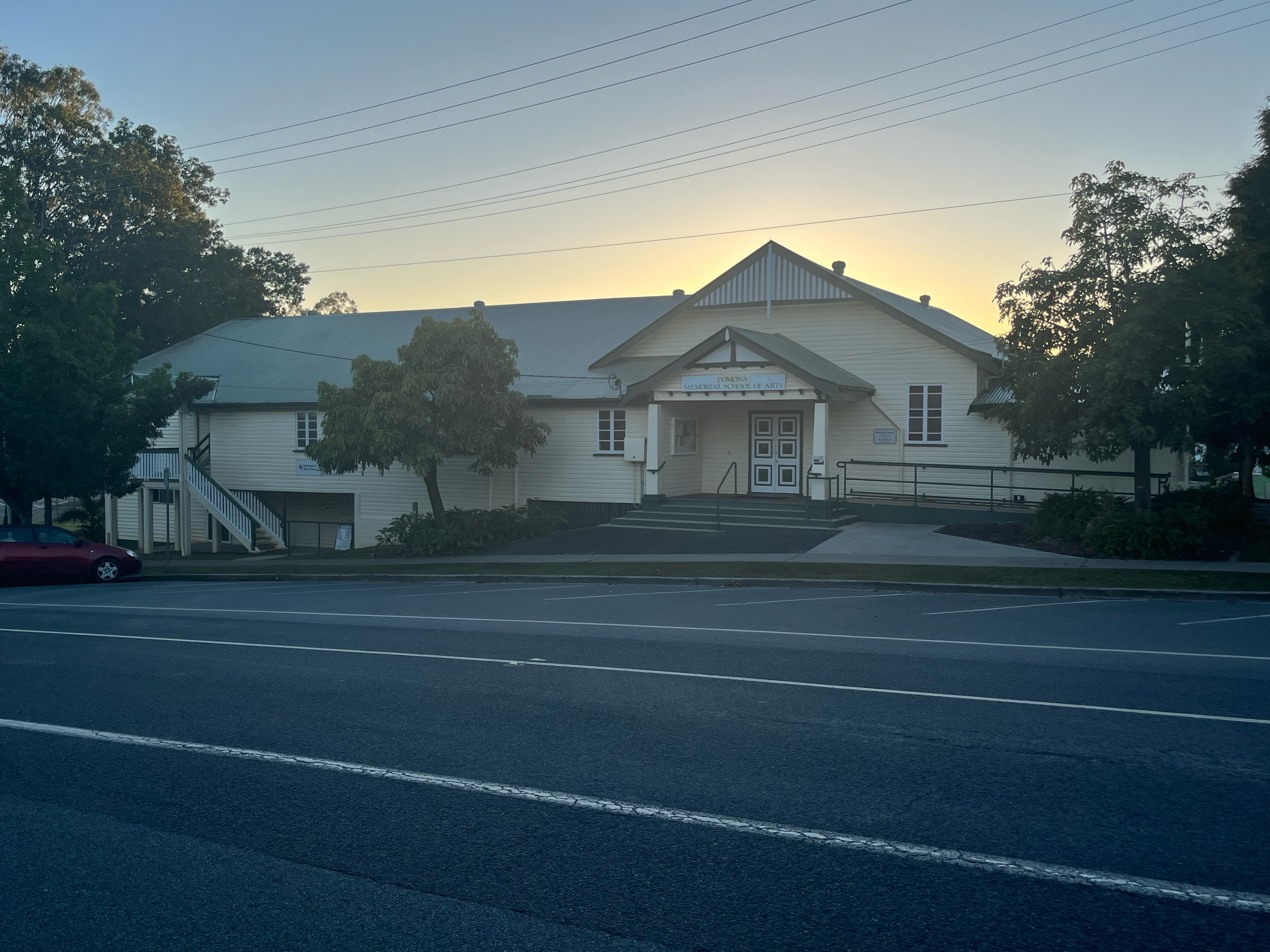
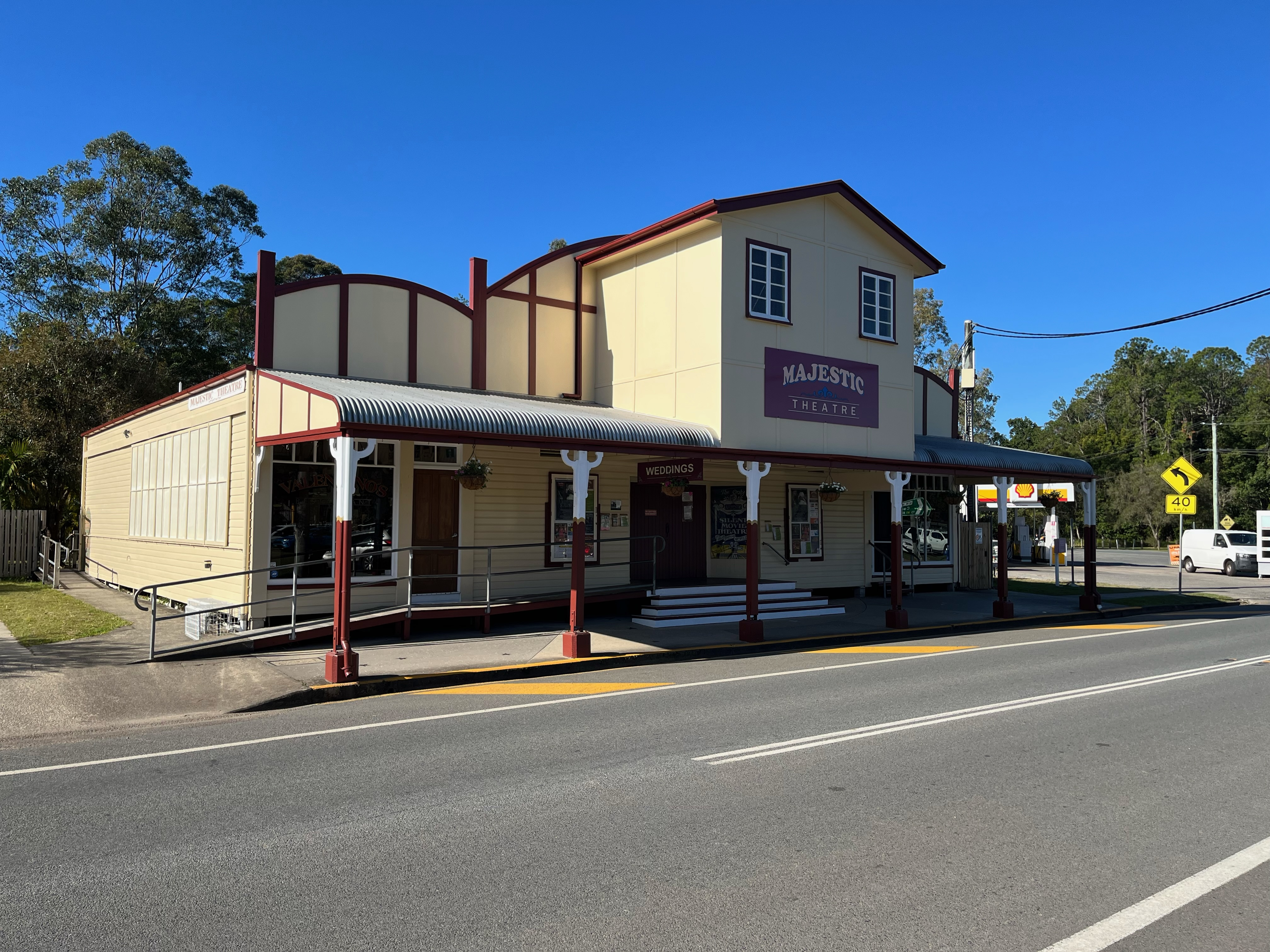
- From top to bottom, left to right: Pomona Hotel; Railway Hotel in 1947; Pomona School of Arts; Majestic Theatre

- Interactive map of Pomona
- Coordinates: 26.3659°S 152.8549°E
- Country: Australia
- State: Queensland
- City: Sunshine Coast
- LGA: Shire of Noosa
- Location: 22.2 km (13.8 mi) WNW of Tewantin; 136 km (85 mi) N of Brisbane
- Established: 1890

Government
  - State electorates: Noosa; Cooroora (Former)
  - Federal division: Wide Bay

Area
  - Total: 53.8 km^{2} (20.8 sq mi)

Population
  - Total: 2,931 (2021 census)
  - Density: 54.48/km^{2} (141.10/sq mi)
- Time zone: UTC+10:00 (AEST)
- Postcode: 4568
Localities around Pomona
Cooran	Pinbarren Cootharaba	Ringtail Creek
Tuchekoi National Park	Pomona	Lake Macdonald
Federal	Black Mountain	Cooroy

Pomona is a rural town and locality in the Shire of Noosa, Queensland, Australia. It is about 135 kilometres north of Brisbane. The town was called Pinbarren Siding from 1890–1900 as a subsidiary to Pinbarren. In the 2021 census, the locality of Pomona had a population of 2,931.

== Geography ==
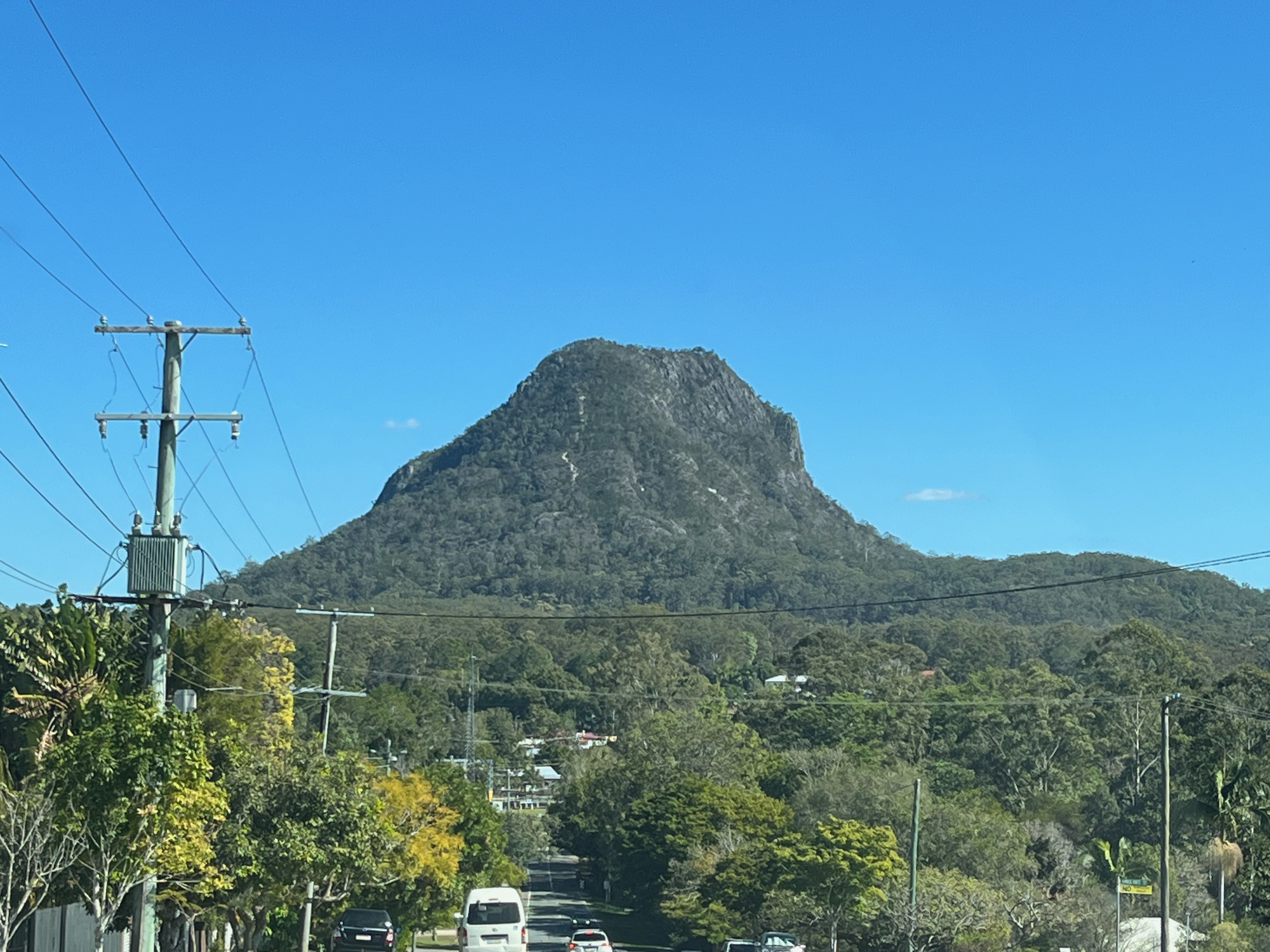
Mount Cooroora from Hill Street in July 2023

The locality of Pomona is bounded to the south by the Bruce Highway and along most of its northern boundary by Six Mile Creek.

The township of Pomona is surrounded by rural residential acreage properties and small farms. A significant portion of the locality is within Yurol State Forest, a legacy of days past when the town once was a centre of forestry activities. The forest is now preserved as koala habitat.

Mount Cooroora is in the south-west of the locality (26.3713°S 152.8380°E), rising to 439 metres (1,440 ft). It is a high intrusive volcanic plug within the Tuchekoi National Park. It is approximately 2 kilometres (1.2 mi) south-west of the town. The surrounding area is of high importance to Aboriginal people and there are many sites of Indigenous cultural importance across the region. Mount Cooroora has significant landscape, social and economic values to the town, while its vertical columns are an attraction to geologists.

Pomona is within the Noosa Biosphere recognised by the United Nations Economic, Scientific and Cultural Organization (UNESCO) in 2007 as a World Biosphere Reserve.

== History ==
=== Early to present ===
Pomona was first settled by Europeans in the late 1880s, but had been home to the Kabi Kabi/Gubbi Gubbi indigenous peoples for thousands of years before that. Early settlers collected timber from the area.

=== Railway ===
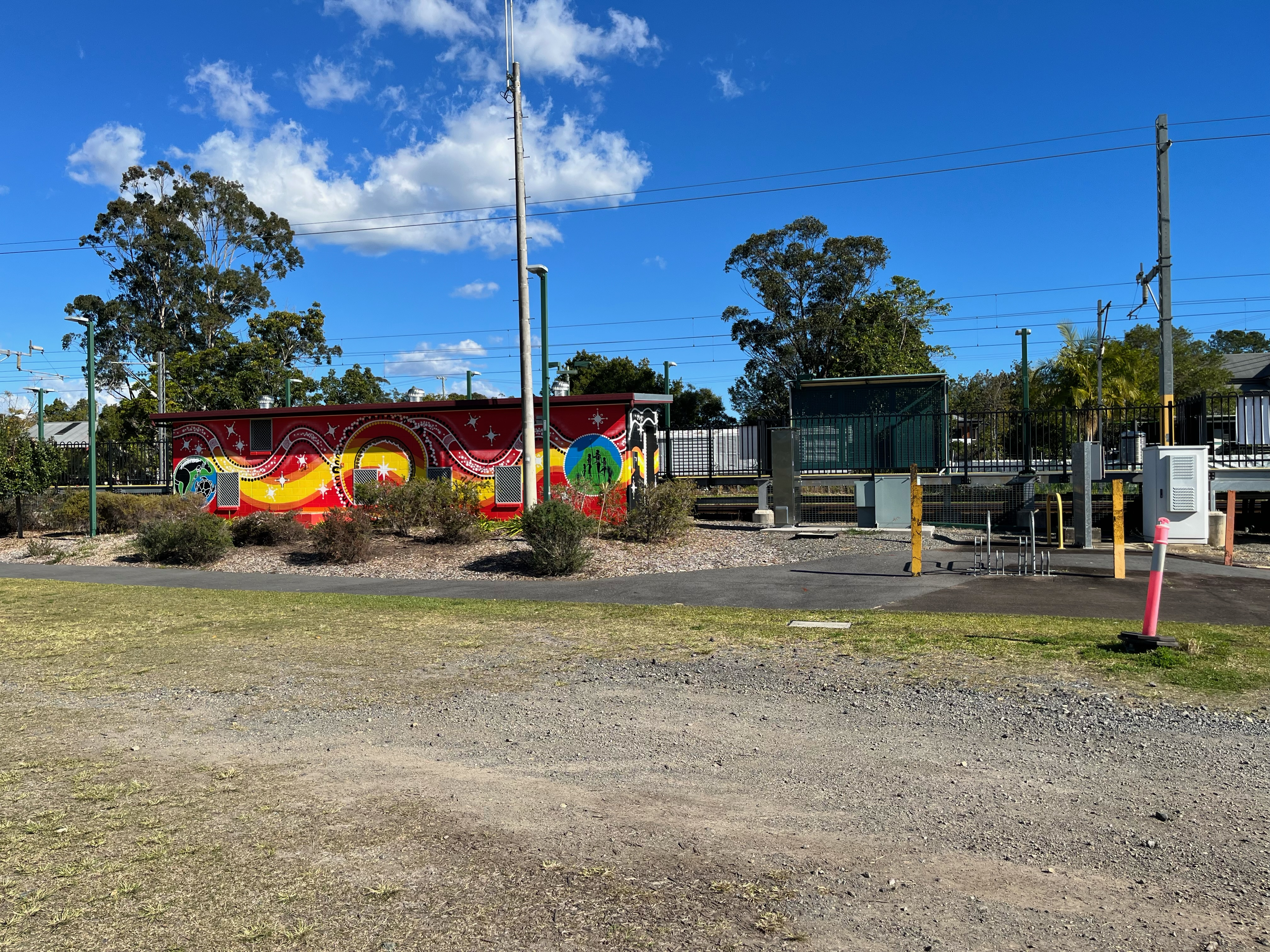
Pomona Railway Station in 2023

The railway to Pomona commenced operation in 1891, with the first station being a small wooden structure of about 12’x10’ and was under the supervision of Mrs. J. Kelleher who had to look after the general business of the Department

Construction of the railway station gave farmers the ability to sell their goods over a wide reaching area. In 1925, Pomona district farmers sent 14,924 cases of bananas alone to Brisbane and southern markets.

The Pomona station sat at the northern end of the Yurol State Forest with Yurol railway station being built in 1912 at the southern end of the Forest. The gradient within the forest was exceptionally steep and the Yurol station was the highest station in Queensland above sea level at the time.

==== Post Office ====
The first post office was run out of the main office of the railway station with Mrs. J. Kelleher conducting the duties from 1897.

=== Majestic Theatre ===
The Majestic Theatre was built in 1921 as a social hall and was later used as a movie theatre. The theatre is now the oldest silent movie theatre still operating and features a still functional rare 1936 Compton organ.

=== Noosa Council ===
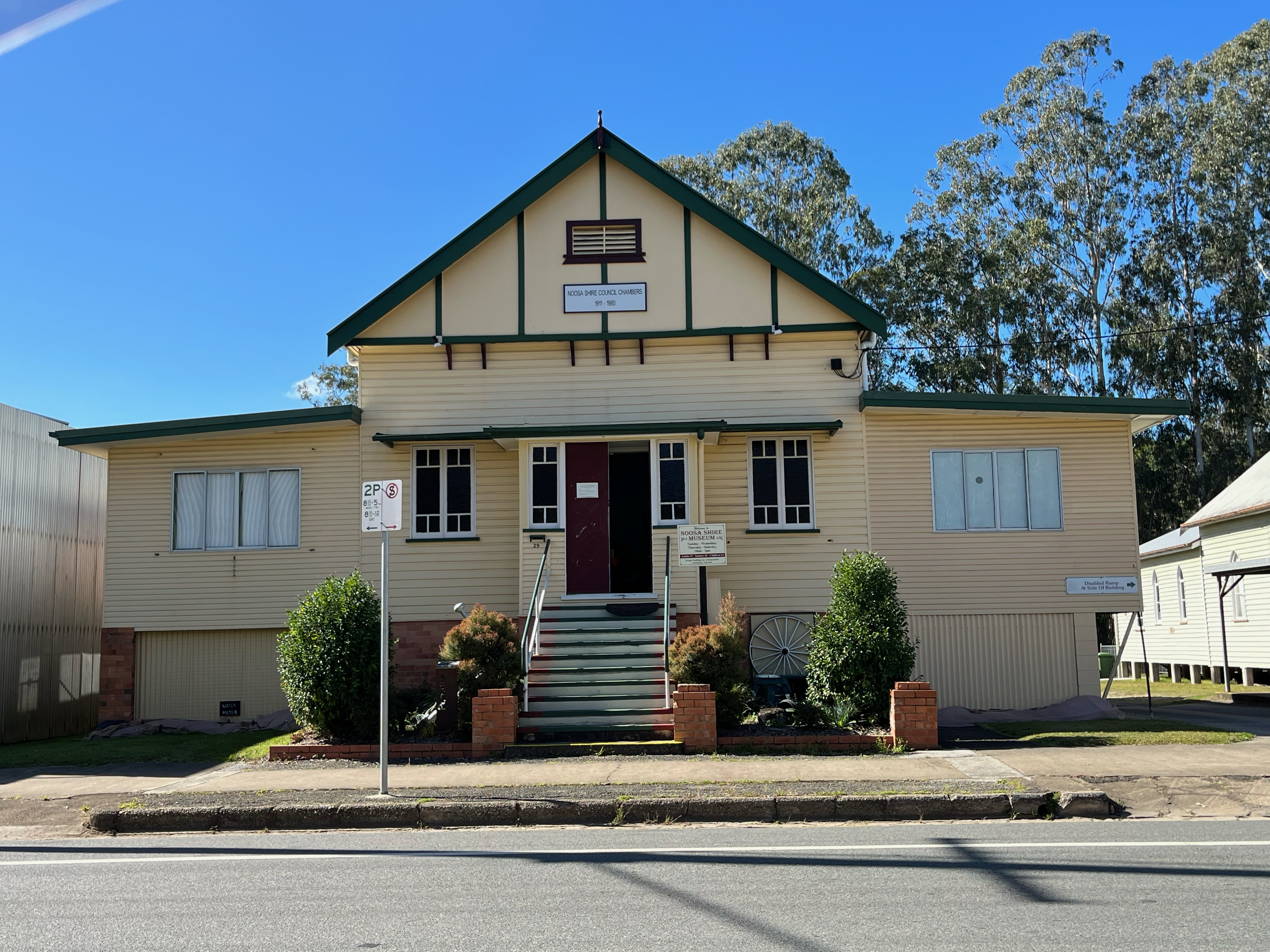
The Former Noosa Council Chambers and current Noosa Museum in July 2023

The town became the administrative centre of the Noosa Shire Council when it was established in 1910. However, on 1 December 1980 the Council chambers moved to Tewantin. The original headquarters for the Shire, which were constructed in 1911, are now used by the Cooroora Historical Society and Noosa Shire Museum. Colonial buildings are also a feature of the town and can be viewed along a signed history walk.

=== Emergency services ===
The first Pomona Fire and Rescue Station was commissioned in 1956 next to the Subway which often meant it was flooded during moderate to major storms. in 2015 it was replaced with a new station next to the Ambulance Station, this features a quad bay shed, indoor and out door training facilities.

On 17 July 1917, the Pomona branch of the Queensland ambulance service transport brigade (QATB) was established with the opening of Ambulance House in Ambulance Street, where the local Superintendent operated from. The same year this was joined by the construction of an ambulance shed within the grounds of the Pomona railway station. In 1921, the for ease of access, the shed was moved next to Ambulance House where it stayed in operation until 1951. In 1951 with the completion of the Pomona Ambulance Centre, both the superintendents residence and sheds operations were moved into town. The new centre was built next door to the ES&A building. On the day of its 100th anniversary, the Queensland Ambulance Service held an open day hosted by the district assistant commissioner. On 17 April 1971, Sir Thomas Hiley, at a public ceremony handed over a new Valiant Ambulance to the station.

The first Pomona police station opened on 23 July 1927, located at 1 Railway Parade, and today still stands as a private residence. Between 1927-1934, the Pomona Memorial School of Arts Hall was used as the shire courthouse. In October 1934, the second police station was opened along with the new shire court house next door. The new station included a new cell block. In 2004, the third and current police station was opened exactly between the first and second stations and the 1934 court house. The second police station is now solely used as the sergeants residence.

=== Religion ===
Pomona Methodist Church opened on 26 March 1921 by the Reverend Henry Youngman. In 1925, the Methodist Church building at Kareewa was relocated to behind the Pomona Methodist Church to be used as the church hall. In 1977 the Methodist Church amalgamated into the Uniting Church in Australia and the church in Pomona became the Pomona Uniting Church.

The St Patrick's Catholic Church was established on 26 March 1922. On 30 March 1949 Archbishop James Duhig laid the foundation stone for St Patrick's Catholic Primary School, located next to the Catholic Church. (26.3664°S 152.8517°E). Duhig returned on 30 November 1947 to bless and open the school, which was operated by the Presentation Sisters. The school closed in 1971.

The Anglican Church of Pomona was established on 31 March 1974, with the foundation stone being laid by the district Archbishop.

=== Schools ===
Pinbarren Provisional School opened on 1 August 1897 and was originally located on Reserve Street near the business centre of the town, in what is now called Stan Topper Park. On 1 January 1909, it became Pomona State School and from 1945 the school included a secondary department (Grades 8–10). In 1976 the primary school was relocated to the Ellis Estate to join the Pomona High School.

In 1945 the secondary department was established next door to the primary school. The department was moved in 1970 to the Ellis Estate as the Pomona High School, and joined later by the primary school in 1976. In 1995, the high school was moved again to its current location on Summit Road and renamed Cooroora Secondary College. On 25 September 2006, Cooroora Secondary College was made a campus of Noosa District State High School, with year 10 students forcibly transferred to the Cooroy campus from 2 September 2007. On 15 May 2007, a town meeting saw 687 Pomona residents sign a petition to cancel to the transfer of year 10 to Cooroy, cancel the transfer of the school to be under Noosa District State High School and to add years 11 and 12 to the school. Ultimately the town meeting and petition was unsuccessful. In June 2023, a A$13 million upgrade of the school, including the addition of a hall was announced.

=== Banks ===
On 7 October 1970, the Commercial Bank of Australia closed down It was originally built in April 1909 near the hall and was defined as "a fine building". The English, Scottish & Australian Bank building was opened in 1936, the ES&A bank became the ANZ Bank in 1970, however in October 2014 the ANZ Bank Pomona branch closed down and in the same year that the Bendigo Bank opened its Pomona branch opposite the Old railway station art gallery. The Bendigo Bank closed down on 1 April 2022.

=== Parks and memorials ===
==== Cemetery ====
A 10-acre (4.0 ha) site was surveyed for a cemetery in August 1896 on the Tewantin Road (now Pomona Kin Kin Road) and it was officially proclaimed in November 1896. The site was described as "sitting on a ridgeline" and "thickly timbered with mahogany, bloodwood and box trees". In March 1897, the initial trustees were appointed: Thomas Horsman, Michael Gearey, Henry Armitage Snr, William Martin and Eugene von Blanckensee. In 1954, the Noosa Shire Council took control of the cemetery and added a lawn cemetery in 1972.

==== School of Arts ====
The Pomona Memorial School of Arts was formally opened on 4 September 1926 by the Lieutenant-Governor of Queensland the honourable William Lennon, however construction began in 1922.

==== War memorial ====
The Rotunda and Soldiers Memorial Park were officially dedicated on 24 June 1939 as a tribute and monument to the memory of King George V and to those from the District who died in service or were killed in action during the Great War. The war memorial was built over several years by the Pomona Branch of the RSSILA, the structure was built as the feature of the 'Soldiers Memorial Park', controversially renamed 'Joe Bazzo Park' by Noosa Council. The structure is described as "octagonal stone rotunda with a diameter of about ten feet. The base and pillars comprise stone obtained from, local quarries, and the structure is finished with a red tile roof. The floor is cemented and the ceiling of the rotunda is of asbestos sheeting painted white. An electric point is situated underneath an ornamental covering, and this will be utilised to provide an eternal flame when the North Coast electricity scheme has been extended to Pomona."

In 2018 a community effort saw the rotunda restored after the Council suggested the memorial be converted into a bus stop. The former electric light was restored and replaced with a modern 'eternal' flame style flame light that is automatically turned on every night. The surrounding gardens were cleaned up and restored by the Noosa and District Land Care. On remembrance Day 2018, the memorial was rededicated by Major General John Cantwell with approximately 250 people attending the ceremony with plans for future ANZAC Day and Remembrance Day services.

==== Cooroora Creek Park ====
The Cooroora Creek Park was established in 1988, centrally located is designated as an off-leash dog park with free public use exercise equipment and walking/running paths.

=== Disasters ===
The main streets of the town were devastated by two separate fires in 1939 and 1942. Many buildings were re-constructed with brick or in the "Art Deco" architectural style of the era.

In 2014, a major bushfire resulted in Mount Cooroora and the surrounding Tuchekoi National Park burning for a week.

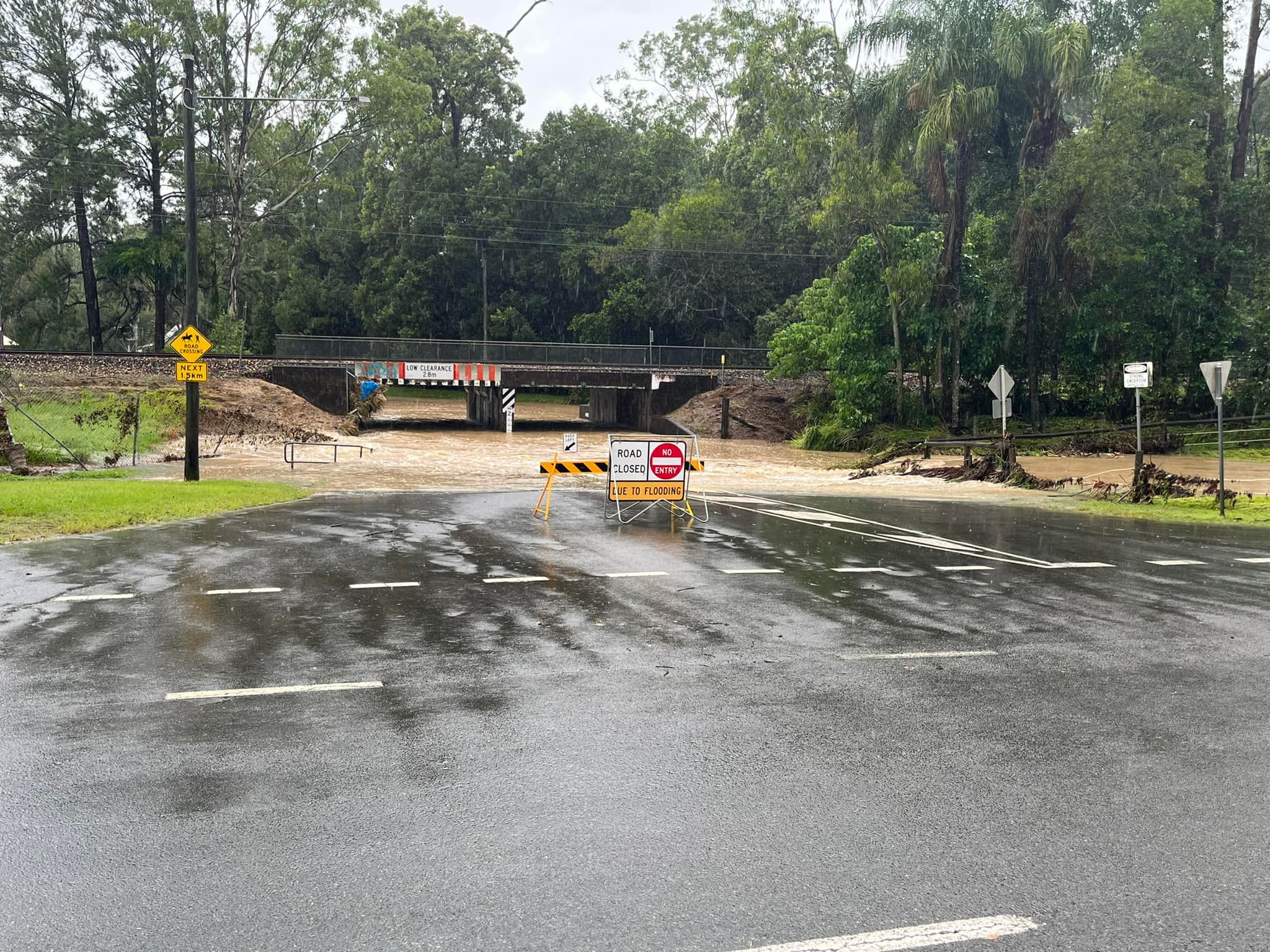
Subway Avenue, Pomona, Queensland during the 2022 eastern Australia floods

The 2022 South East Queensland flood saw significant flooding around Pomona. 450mm of rainfall was recorded from 24–25 February, the second-highest in the state; it reached 786mm later on 25 February, and more than 1,000mm by 26 February.

== Demographics ==
In the 2021 census, the locality of Pomona had a population of 2,931.

In the 2016 census, the locality of Pomona had a population of 2,910.

== Education ==
Pomona State School is a government primary (Prep–6) school for boys and girls at 74 Station Street (26.3679°S 152.8606°E). In 2018, the school had an enrolment of 303 students with 25 teachers (20 full-time equivalent) and 15 non-teaching staff (10 full-time equivalent).

Noosa District State High School is a government secondary (7–12) school for boys and girls with two campuses, the Pomona campus at 120 Summit Road in Pomona (26.3531°S 152.8631°E), for Years 7–8 and the Cooroy campus at Tulip Street in Cooroy for Years 9–12. In 2016, the school had a total enrolment of 1,335 students with 111 teachers (106 full-time equivalent) and 48 non-teaching staff (40 full-time equivalent).

== Heritage listings ==
Pomona is Noosa Shire's 'living heritage town'. It has a number of heritage-listed sites, including:

State heritage

- Majestic Theatre, 3 Factory Street, built 1921 (26.3655°S 152.8576°E)
- Cooroora Masonic Temple, 9 Station Street, built 1923 (26.3671°S 152.8569°E)
- Courthouse & former Pomona Police Station, Residence & Lockup, Red Street, built 1934 (26.3634°S 152.8541°E)

Local heritage

- Pomona Cemetery, 36 Pomona–Kin Kin Road, built 1896
- Kybong State School (former), 2 Mountain Street, built 1905
- Pomona State School (former) & Stan Topper Park, 21 Reserve Street, built 1907
- Noosa Show Grounds and Pavilion, 12 Exhibition Street, built 1910
- Noosa Council Chambers (former), 29 Factory Street, built 1911
- Pomona Hotel, 1 Station Street, built 1913
- Pomona Butter Factory (Former) & Page Furnishers (Former), 20 Factory Street, built 1919
- Pomona Uniting Church, 27 Factory Street, built 1921
- St Patrick's Catholic Church, 1 Church Street, built 1922
- Pomona Memorial School of Arts, 6 Reserve Street, built 1926
- Pomona Ambulance Station, 17 Reserve Street, built 1930's
- Pomona Post Office, 11 Memorial Avenue, built 1936
- Pomona Rotunda, 2 Reserve Street, built 1939
- Page Motors (former), 17–19 Factory Street, built 1946
- Shop, 9 Factory Street, built 1965

== Economy ==
Pomona's hinterland economy benefits from a growing agri-business sector, supported by Country Noosa, a local organisation that promotes sustainable agriculture, horticulture, and rural enterprise across the region.

The Cooroora Trail, which connects Pomona to the neighbouring town of Cooran, was upgraded in 2021 with a $1.6 million investment as part of the Local Economic Recovery program following the 2019 bushfires.

Pomona is also considered an informal access hub for the Noosa Biosphere Trails, due to its strategic location within the trail network and growing recreational appeal.

== Amenities ==
The Shire of Noosa operates a library service on a weekly schedule at the corner of Reserve Street and Memorial Avenue.

Cooroy Pomona Uniting Church is at 27 Factory Street (26.3635°S 152.8562°E).

== Facilities ==
Pomona Cemetery is at 36 Pomona Kin Kin Road (26.3441°S 152.8531°E). It is operated by the Noosa Shire Council.

Pomona Ambulance Station is at 15-17 Reserve Street (26.3656°S 152.8546°E).

== Events ==
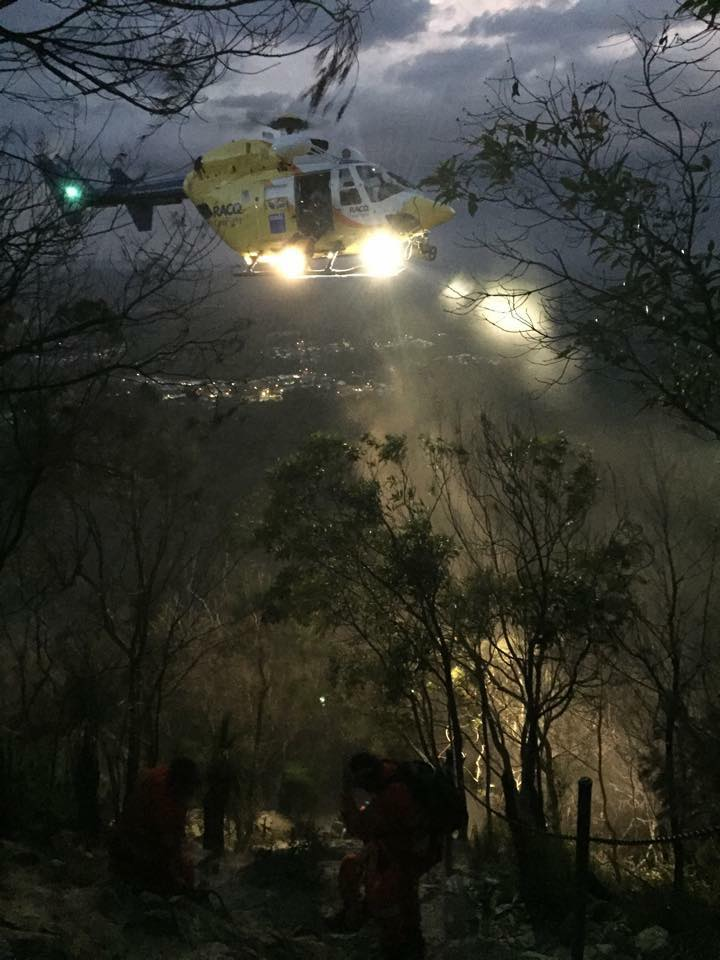
Helicopter rescue from Mount Cooroora during the 2015 King of the Mountain

The 100km Noosa Trail Network of walking tracks through the surrounding forests, farmlands and villages is popular with visitors, but especially every second October when the Great Noosa Trail Walk is held. Visitors may also walk to the top of Mount Cooroora, the solidified lava plug of an ancient volcano worn away over time. Every July, thousands of people cheer 100 runners who race to the top of the mountain and back in under 30 minutes in the annual King of the Mountain. In the past, those not fit enough to race up the mountain participated in 'billy cart' races or the world thong throwing championships (thongs of the footwear variety) with the rules stating that a size 10 thong, or larger, was required. As at 2010, the record throw was 42.8 metres.

In 2024, the Cooroy-Pomona Lions Club, organisers of the King of the Mountain Race, announced that the event will no longer be held, due to restrictions imposed by the Queensland Parks and Wildlife Service. The club said it will continue to conduct the associated annual Family Fun Day in Stan Topper Park.

The district's rural roots are celebrated every September with the staging of the annual "show" (county fair). The Noosa Country Show has been a local institution since 1909.

Local food and craft markets are held every Saturday morning. Every month, environmentally-aware enthusiasts collect and distribute seeds of native plants. The Permaculture Noosa organisation also holds a weekly harvest swap at the Cooroy Community Gardens.

== Attractions ==
Pomona is notable for its relaxed streetscape of distinctive timber and art deco buildings, the heritage-listed Majestic Theatre and the walk to the top of its imposing mountain sentinel Mount Cooroora in the Tuchekoi National Park. The Majestic, built in 1921, is claimed to be the world's oldest continuously operating silent movie theatre built for that purpose. However, it is not the first theatre in the world in which silent films were screened. The Majestic has been a community-owned enterprise since October 2006.

Australian musician Darren Hanlon's album "Fingertips and Mountaintops" was entirely recorded in the Majestic Theatre.

The Noosa Shire Museum contains objects, photographs and historic documents that explain much of the early history of the area. It is also a Keeping Place of indigenous sacred objects. The old Pomona Railway Station has been moved to the other side of the railway tracks to become the Railway Station Art Gallery.

== Geographical points of interest ==
- Former Pomona Hospital (26.3663°S 152.8531°E)
- Pomona Post Office (26.3656°S 152.8535°E)
- Former ANZ Bank (26.3659°S 152.8546°E)
- Former Pomona State School location, Current Pomona Kindergarten and main town park (26.3667°S 152.8541°E)
- Soldiers Memorial Park & King George V Memorial (26.3657°S 152.8550°E)
- Former Railway Hotel location (26.3659°S 152.8573°E)
- Pomona Hotel (26.3663°S 152.8559°E)
