= King of the Mountain (race) =

Athletic festival in Queensland, Australia

- Status: Permanently cancelled
- Genre: Foot race up Mount Cooroora
- Date: Third week in July
- Frequency: Annually
- Venue: Stan Topper Park
- Location: Pomona
- Coordinates: 26.3663°S 152.8543°E
- Country: Australia
- Years active: 1958–1960, 1979–2023
- Inaugurated: June 27, 1959
- Founder: Bruce Samuels; Barry Webb
- Previous event: 23 July 2023
- Website: kingofthemountain.com.au

The King of the Mountain is an annual mountain climb race held in Pomona, in the Australian state of Queensland and organised by the Cooroy-Pomona Lions Club. Since its first formal race in 1959 following a bet in the Railway Hotel in 1958, the race has become a local holiday involving the district schools and a carnival like atmosphere.

== Course ==
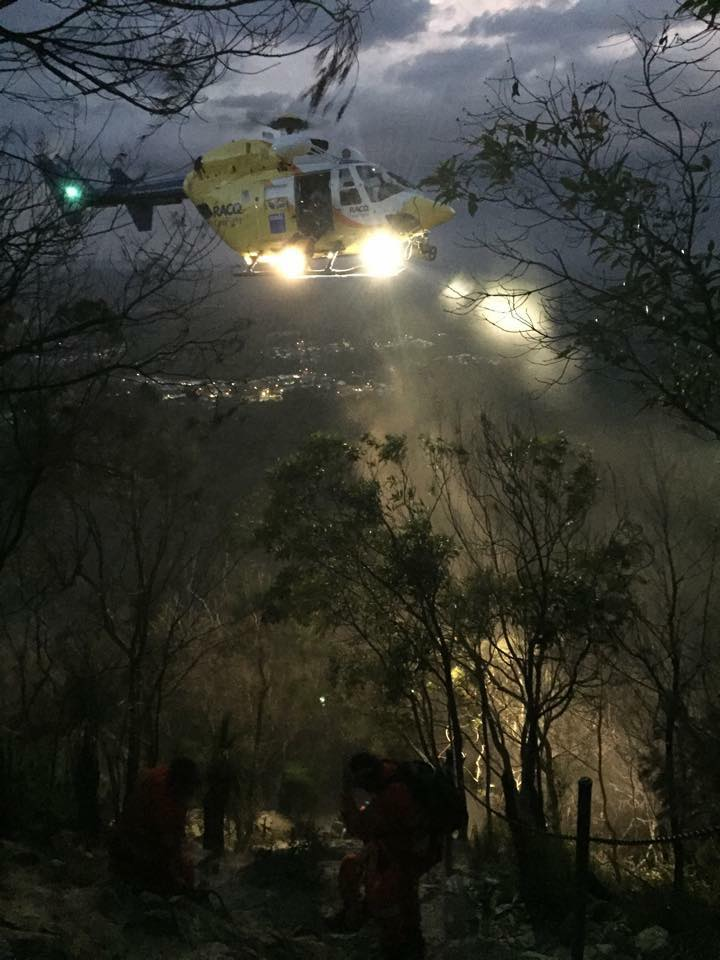
Helicopter rescue from Mount Cooroora during the 2015 race.

The original course was from the Railway Hotel (now demolished) to the top of Mount Cooroora and back. The 1979–2021 course went from the ANZ Bank to the top and back. The 2022–Present course is 1 km longer but still starts from the old ANZ Bank building.

== History ==
In 1958, Bruce Samuels, a local footballer and railway porter in the town ran to the top of Mount Cooroora as a hangover cure. After being called out, a timed run was held on 22 March 1958 with Samuels completing the run in 40 minutes. In 1959, Brisbane local Barry Webb took up the challenge and completed it in 35:00. On 27 June 1959, the first formal race was held with Frank Mainwaring taking the title with a time of 31:51.

On 1 March 2024, the Pomona Lions Club announced in a public statement that the race was permanently cancelled following a raft of strict conditions put in place by the Queensland Parks and Wildlife Service (QPWS). In a public statement by the Department of Environment, Science and Innovation issued on 2 March, they said "In recent years the entry numbers have been limited to 80 competitors at QPWS’s request, the only amendment requested this year has been that the start is staggered over two stages of 40 competitors each." The resulting public comment has called for the event to be held as per usual in July with the new condition inplace.

== Inter-school challenge ==
As part of the festival, the inter-school relay is held on the morning of the race on the road surrounding Stan Topper Park. Some schools also partake in the inter-school tug-o-war competition.

The following schools participate:

- Cooran State School
- Cooroy State School
- Federal State School
- Gympie South State School
- Pomona State School
- St Andrew's Anglican College

== Main race winners ==
Bruce Samuels completed a timed run in 1958 to prove it was possible with a time of 35:00. Barry Webb was the first to take up the challenge in 1959 with a time of 40:00, shortly after that on 27 June 1959, Frank Mainwaring took the title in the first formal race involving 5 competitors.

Year	Male		Female	
Year	Name	Time	Name	Time
1958	Bruce Samuels	40:00	—N/a	
1959	Barry Webb	35:00	—N/a	
1959	Frank Mainwaring	31:51	—N/a	
1960	Ken Fullerton	29:44	—N/a	
1979	George Fewtrell	26:14	Anne Daly	not recorded
1980	George Fewtrell	26:25	—N/a	
1981	George Fewtrell	26:03	Bernadette Evans	45:25
1982	George Fewtrell	26:13	Anne Daly	33:11
1983	George Fewtrell	24:51	Bernadette Evans	38:43
1984	George Fewtrell	25:42	Anne Daly	31:32
1985	Graham Barralet	23:27	Rosalie Hyland	31:37
1986	Barry Posser	23:48	Maureen Lawson	30:48
1987	Graham Barralet	22:50	Suzy Walsham	30:04
1988	Barry Posser	22:53	Sue Malaxos	27:48
1989	Graham Barralet	22:55	Maureen Lawson	29:53
1990	Graham Barralet	23:20	Lynette Gordon	32:07
1991	Graham Barralet	23:13	Lynette Gordon	31:13
1992	Barry Posser	24:32	Lynette Gordon	31:34
1993	Barry Posser	25:14	Kim Beckinsale	30:53
1994	Barry Posser	24:04	Meagan Burton	28:55
1995	Matthew Kaluder	24:45	Meagan Burton	29:09
1996	Aaron Strong	28:18	Meagan Burton	34:37
1997	Aaron Strong	23:27	Meagan Burton	29:30
1998	Matthew Kaluder	24:45	Corallea Edwards	31:14
1999	Barry Posser	24:46	Terri Kolb	33:40
2000	Anthony Smith	24:36	Corallea Edwards	31:43
2001	Aaron Strong	25:02	Meagan Edhouse	30:34
2002	Michael Wakelin	24:13	Corallea Edwards	31:04
2003	Chris Morrissey	24:25	Kim Beckinsale	31:01
2004	Michael Wakelin	24:13	Kim Beckinsale	31:10
2005	Chris Morrissey	24:39	Hubertien Wichers	31:04
2006	Neil Labinsky	24:25	Hubertien Wichers	30:45
2007	Neil Labinsky	23:54	Hubertien Wichers	31:36
2008	Neil Labinsky	22:56	Hubertien Wichers	30:37
2009	Neil Labinsky	22:43	Maree Stephensen	29:05
2010	Neil Labinsky	23:38	Maree Stephensen	28:17
2011	Neil Labinsky	24:16	Hubertien Wichers	32:38
2012	Neil Labinsky	24:20	Demelsa Murrihy	32:56
2013	Ben Duffus	24:22	Helen Roundtree	28:55
2014	Ben Duffus	23:47	Kim Beckinsale	31:11
2015	Hayden Wilde	25:42	Leslie Saunders	33:14
2016	Mark Bourne	23:53	Leslie Saunders	31:19
2017	Mark Bourne	24:36	Ruby Muir	27:49
2018	Ben Duffus	23:30	Meg Reeves	30:47
2019	Boaz Clark	26:30	Reesha Lewis	29:49
2020	Race cancelled due to COVID-19 pandemic			
2021	Jorge Hernaez Navarro	27:11	Leslie Saunders	33:04
2022	Mark Bourne	31:24	Lee Cleary	40:39
2023	Jorge Hernaez Navarro	31:15	Ange Harries	40:22

== Popular culture ==
Australian band, Midnight Oil, created a theme song for the event when in 1990 they released a single about the race by the same name, King of the Mountain. Although many people think the song is a reference to Peter Brock and the Bathurst 1000 held at Mount Panorama, drummer Rob Hirst confirmed the song is actually inspired by the footrace up Mount Cooroora and the surrounding natural beauty and unique history of the Noosa hinterland.
