= Cooroora Masonic Temple =

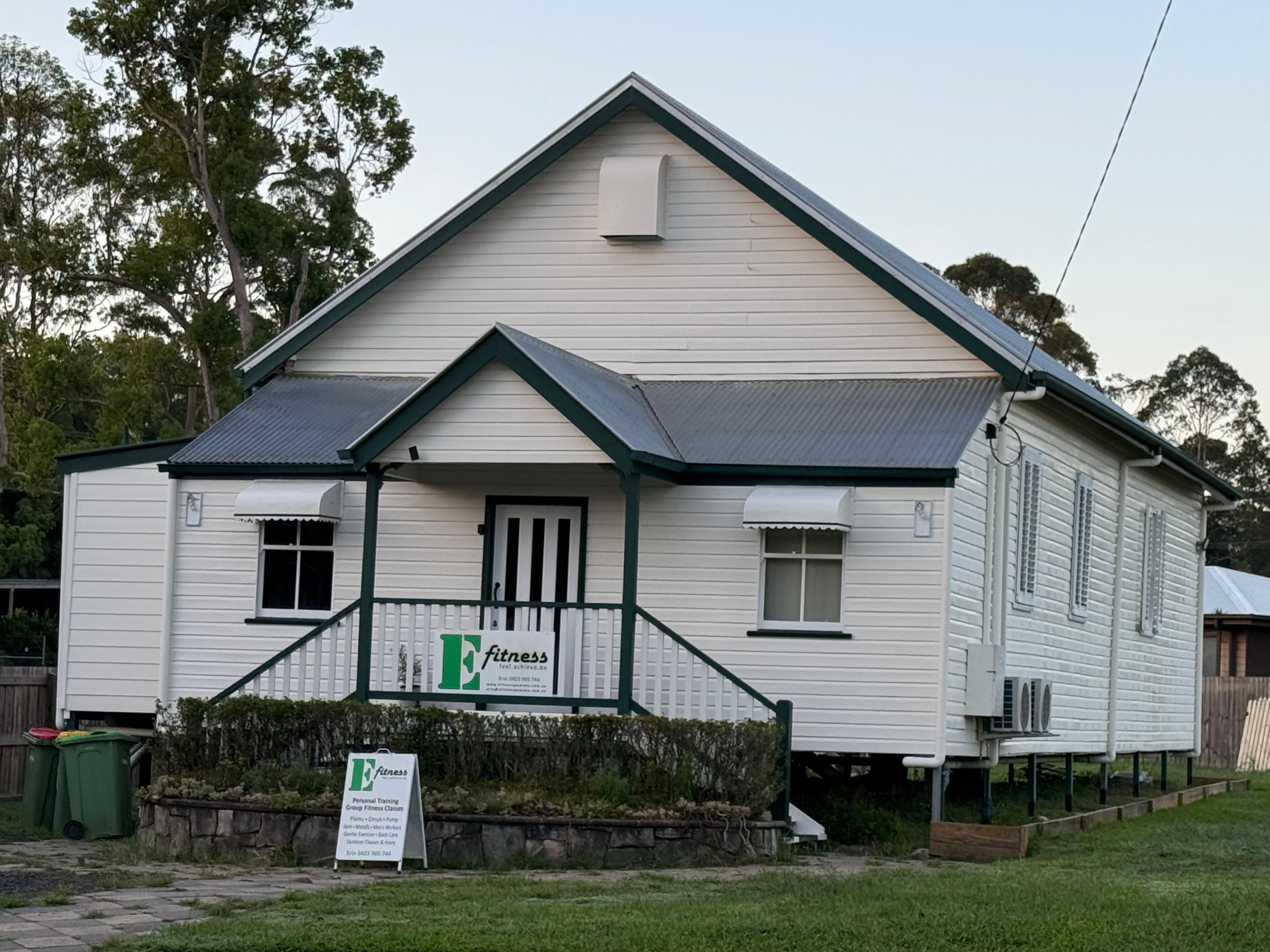
- Former Cooroora Masonic Temple in 2026

- Location within Queensland Location within Australia
- 26.3671°S 152.8569°E
- Location: 9 Station Street, Pomona, Shire of Noosa, Queensland, Australia

History
- Design period: 1919–1930s (interwar period)
- Built: 1923–1923

Queensland Heritage Register
- Official name: Cooroora Masonic Temple (former)
- Type: state heritage (built)
- Designated: 12 December 2003
- Reference no.: 602423
- Significant period: 1923, 1925–1938 (fabric); 1923–c. 2003 (historical)
- Significant components: mural / fresco, furniture/fittings

Cooroora Masonic Temple is a heritage-listed community hall at 9 Station Street, Pomona, Shire of Noosa, Queensland, Australia. It was built in 1923. It was added to the Queensland Heritage Register on 12 December 2003.

== History ==
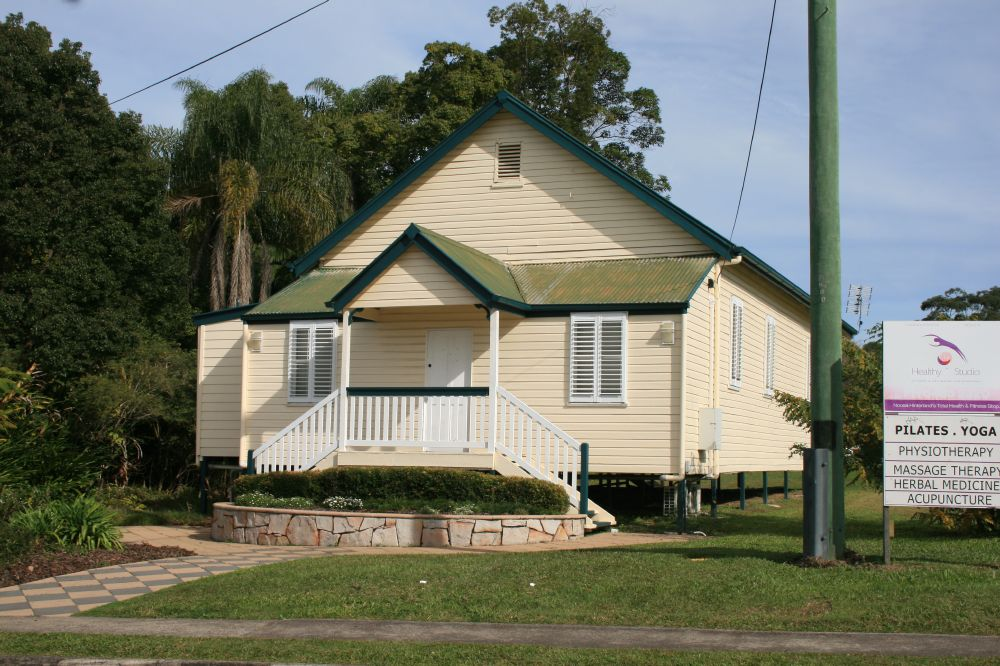
Cooroora Masonic Lodge in 2016

The former Cooroora Masonic Temple was erected in 1923 and is opposite the Pomona railway station in the small Sunshine Coast hinterland town of Pomona.

The land on which it is situated was part of an Agricultural Allotment of 160 acres (65 ha) occupied under license by Robert Peter Grant in 1896. The area developed in the early 20th century with an economic base of timber, dairying and fruit growing. Page Furnishers Pty Ltd, a furniture making company operated between 1919 and 2025, was also a major source of local employment. The township of Pomona was named in 1900 for the Roman goddess of fruit and for much of the 20th century acted as a service and administrative centre for Noosa Shire.

Freemasonry was established in Pomona in 1913. It had arrived in Australia with the first European settlers and spread from New South Wales into Queensland in individual lodges. The first Freemason's lodge in Queensland was established in 1859, shortly before Separation from New South Wales. New lodges were formed as settlement spread, as when a group of 17 Masons in Pomona applied to the Grand Lodge of Scotland to form a Lodge under the Scottish Constitution. This was consecrated as Lodge Cooroora No 1128 on 15 November 1913 at a ceremony at which 78 people were present. The first ordinary meeting was held on 13 December 1913. In 1920 the Lodge affiliated with the Grand Lodge of Queensland under the English Constitution and on 21 April 1921 joined the United Grand Lodge of Queensland as Cooroora Lodge No. 232.

For the first ten years of its existence, the Cooroora Lodge met in a hall at the Noosa Showgrounds. On 22 May 1923 the Trustees of the Lodge purchased a block of land across the road from the railway station. A temple was erected using volunteer labour and cost £800. The first meeting in the new building was held on 23 June 1923.

A local fruiterer and restaurateur, William (Bill) Hodge, who had joined the Lodge in 1920, was Master in 1924–25. In 1925 he began a project to embellish the temple that was to take nine years to complete. Working mainly in the evenings he painted trompe l'oeil murals on all four internal walls of the lodge room. These murals are replicas of those that decorated the Masonic Temple at the Criterion Restaurant, London and were featured in an article in the September 1921 edition of an English Masonic magazine, the Masonic Record. Using the small black and white photographs accompanying the article as a guide, Hodge reproduced the scenes of classical and biblical architecture on the walls of the Pomona temple. Between 1925 and 1928 he painted the Eastern and Western walls and between 1932 and 1934 the southern and northern walls. Hodge mixed the lead-based paints himself, using a neutral palette of beige, grey, black and white. During both periods he worked by kerosene light, as electricity was not supplied to Pomona until 1941. Hodge died in 1949 and is buried in Pomona cemetery.

The subjects and symbols depicted are regarded as highly important to Masonic tradition and philosophy. Although materially modest in value, reflecting the economic status of the small community who met there, the murals are subjectively seen as providing a sense of wealth and elegance to what would otherwise be a very simple interior. They are valued and have been cared for by the members, remaining in good condition.

It is believed that the Criterion Restaurant and the original murals were destroyed during the bombing of London during World War II and that no other known copies of the murals have been made. .

Some of the furniture in the temple was made locally by Page, possibly by Herb Page who established the original cabinet-making workshop in Pomona in 1919.

The number of lodge members peaked in 1965 at 55. Falling membership numbers and lack of funds to maintain the building made the lodge unviable and the building was sold in 2005, with the lodge then meeting at the Tewantin Masonic Lodge before being wound up entirely in 2008.

== Description ==
The former Masonic temple is a rectangular timber-framed building clad externally with hardwood chamferboard. It is set on low metal stumps and has a gabled roof clad with corrugated iron. A verandah along the front appears to have been built in and a small gabled timber porch shades the front entrance and is accessed by timber stairs to each side. Windows along both sides and the front have been blocked but the front windows lighted the anterooms and not the hall proper. The blocking of the side windows to the hall has enabled the murals painted on the interior to cover the whole of each wall.

The front part of the building is an anteroom and contains portraits of Lodge Masters and Members. The interior of the lodge room is lined with vertical boards and has a coved ceiling. The ceiling and upper section of the walls is painted a traditional light blue, which also provides a suggestion of sky. Below this each wall is covered with a trompe l'oeil mural depicting famous buildings replete with Masonic symbolism. The Eastern wall depicts the Temple of Demeter and Dionysus at Eleusis, the western wall the temple of Theseus at Corinth, the Southern wall the Choragic monument of Lysicrates at Athens and the Northern wall the building of the Temple of Solomon at Jerusalem.

The lodge room currently retains equipment and furniture pertaining to Masonic use including chairs was locally manufactured by Page.

== Heritage listing ==
The former Cooroora Masonic Temple was listed on the Queensland Heritage Register on 12 December 2003 having satisfied the following criteria.

The place is important in demonstrating the evolution or pattern of Queensland's history.

The former Cooroora Masonic Temple is important in demonstrating the development of Pomona in the early 20th century and the spread of Freemasonry through Queensland in the wake of European settlement.

The place demonstrates rare, uncommon or endangered aspects of Queensland's cultural heritage.

The interior murals, which embody much of the symbolism and beliefs of Freemasonry, are thought to be unique in Australia. As the original murals appear to have been destroyed by bombing during World War II, the Pomona paintings may now be the only record of this work, originally carried out in the temple of the Criterion Restaurant in London.

The place is important in demonstrating the principal characteristics of a particular class of cultural places.

The former Cooroora Masonic Temple is an intact example of a regional timber Masonic temple, a category of building prominent in the streetscape and important in the social life of many country towns.

The place is important because of its aesthetic significance.

The murals cover all four interior walls of the temple and were painted by William (Bill) Hodge over a period of several years, using small-scale black-and-white photographs as references.

The place has a strong or special association with a particular community or cultural group for social, cultural or spiritual reasons.

The former Cooroora Masonic Temple has a special association with those Freemasons living in and around Pomona and with the Freemasonry movement as an early 20th century temple in Queensland.
