= Noosa District State High School =

Coordinates: 26°25′29″S 152°54′38″E

- Former logo
- Cooroy Campus; Tulip Street, Cooroy, Queensland Pomona Campus; 120 Summit Road, Pomona, Queensland Mimburi Campus; Newspaper Hill Road, Belli Park, Queensland

Information
- Type: State high school
- Motto: Industria Vincit Omnia
- Established: 1996 (Pomona); 1963 (Cooroy)
- Principal: Stacy Wilmore
- Grades: 7 to 8 (Pomona); 9 to 12 (Cooroy)
- Enrollment: 524 (Pomona); 851 (Cooroy)
- Campuses: Pomona; Cooroy; Mimburi
- Colors: Green and white
- Mascot: Possum
- Yearbook: Yali
- Website: noosadistrictshs.eq.edu.au

Noosa District State High School is a twin campus high school based in Cooroy and Pomona in the Shire of Noosa, Queensland, Australia.

The Cooroy campus was established in 1963, and as of 2016, had 1335 students. The school has two campuses in Cooroy and Pomona. The Pomona Campus was originally the Cooroora Secondary College before the two schools merged. Years 7–8 are taught at the Pomona campus, while Years 9–12 are taught at the Cooroy campus. Mimburi campus is located at Belli Park and is used for agricultural ventures and school excursions. There is a permanent cattle farm present at Mimburi. The school's motto is Industria Vincit Omnia (Industry Conquers All).

The school offers certificates in Hospitality, Business, Communication and Technology, Event Production, Media, Agriculture, and Skills for Work and Vocational Pathways. Each year, it runs the Australian Business Week (ABW) program for its Year 11 students. The school has four sports houses – Cooroora, Eerwah, Pinbarren and Tinbeerwah. The houses are named after the mountain ranges in the school's area.

== Administration ==
Stacy Wilmore is the school's acting principal, having taken up the role in 2022. The Deputy Principals at Cooroy are Stacey Daveson, Nick Banks, and Michele Kirland. At Pomona, the Head of Campus is Oliver Colmer and the Deputy Principal is Amelia Tolliday.

== Hall ==
The hall on the Cooroy campus is the biggest in the Noosa area, and is used by many private companies such as dance studios, music schools, and other state schools. It has advanced lighting and audio systems with fifty static lighting channels and a total of twenty-nine audio channels with twenty Sends, five Receives, and two communication channels. The stage was designed to be used for large productions, such as the annual musical, with its many lighting bars, numerous intelligent lights, and extra power circuits for the bigger shows. The hall can seat approximately one thousand people. The technical side of the hall is run by the senior live productions classes.

== Studio ==
Noosa District State High School was one of the first state schools in Queensland to get a fully functional recording studio. Funding was provided by the P&C. It has a vocal booth and radio room which broadcasts audio throughout the school during breaks as part of the Certificate II and III in Live Production, it is also capable of recording an 8 track band. The studio also produces videos using a green screen and chromakey and is used by students to prepare and present multimodal presentations for their class assessments in a range of subject areas including English, Sose/History, Science, Drama and Business. The studio was designed by Live Production students and Pete Gorman. Known as TARDIS, the studio also produces a Newscast which can be seen on the school website. The studio was named after a machine from the long-running science fiction television program Doctor Who, due to the fact that it is larger than it would seem from the outside.

== Notable alumni ==
- Issa Schultz – a Chaser on The Chase Australia
- Steven Rooke – Australian actor and stage performer
