= Mount Cooroora =

Mountain in Australia

- Mount Pomona
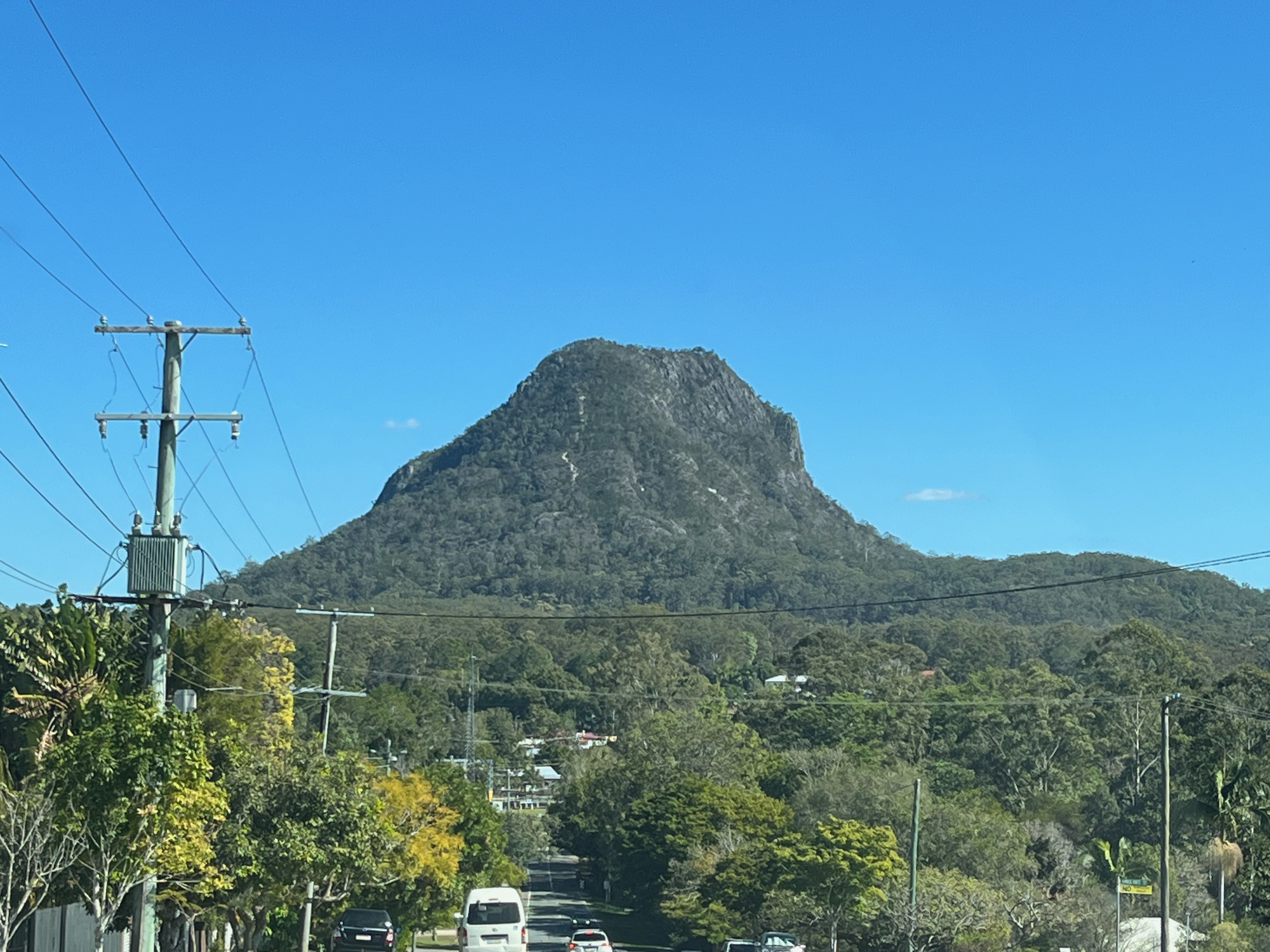
- Mount Cooroora from Hill Street in July 2023

Highest point
- Elevation: 439 m (1,440 ft)
- Coordinates: 26°22′17″S 152°50′17″E

Geography
- Location within Queensland
- Location: Pomona, Queensland

Geology
- Mountain type: Volcanic plug

Climbing
- Easiest route: Hiking trail

Mount Cooroora is located west of the town of Pomona in the Noosa hinterland, Queensland, Australia. The peak is a 439 metres high intrusive volcanic plug and is the highest point and main feature of the Tuchekoi National Park. The former Electoral district of Cooroora was named after the mountain.

== Festival ==
Mount Cooroora plays host to the King of the Mountain festival. The main event at the festival is a footrace straight up the mountain drawing participants from all over the world. Winners of the race complete the run to the summit in a little over 20 minutes. The first run by a local footballer to the top of the mountain occurred in 1958. The Mountain Challenge race began in 1959 and has been run every year since.

== Access ==
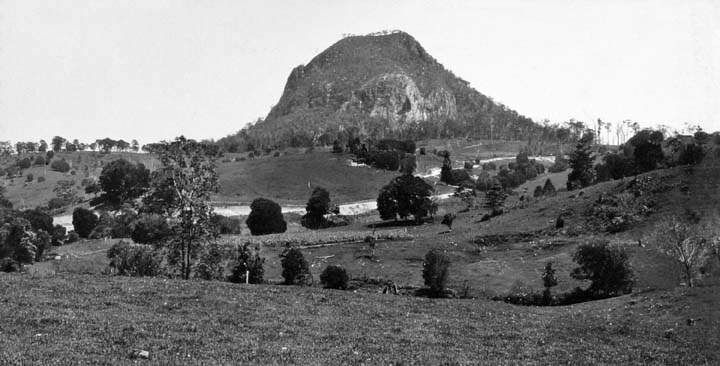
Mount Cooroora in 1931

A maintained stoney path helps guide hikers to the mountain's peak, where good views of the surrounding area are available. The walk takes about two hours and is graded moderate to hard. One section of the climb includes steep metal stairs fixed to rock.

== See also ==
- List of mountains of Australia
