= Pomona State School =

Coordinates: 26°22′08″S 152°51′38″E

- Pomona State School logo
- 74 Station Street; Pomona, Queensland, 4568; Australia

Information
- Type: Primary school
- Motto: Sibi Fidelis ("Be Faithful To Oneself")
- Established: 31 August 1897; 128 years ago
- School district: North Coast Region
- Principal: Alyson Covey
- Faculty: 37 (2022)
- Grades: P–6
- Enrollment: 277 (2023)
- Colors: Blue & yellow
- Mascot: Pomona
- Website: pomonass.eq.edu.au

Pomona State School is a government primary school in Pomona, Shire of Noosa, Queensland, Australia. It was established on 31 August 1897.

== History ==
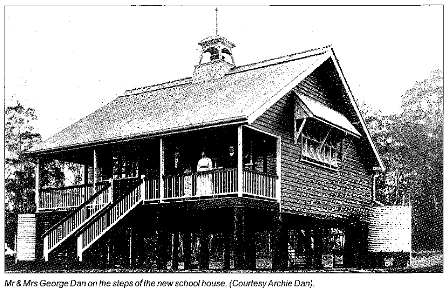
Pomona State School, circa 1909

Originally named Pinbarren Provisional School from its establishment until 1909, when it was upgraded from a provisional school to a state school, and renamed Pomona State School. The school cost £813 for a simple high-set timber building with one large room and a verandah.

=== School district ===
The local school district was a patchwork of small schools in what would become the Shire of Noosa. The 1910 establishment of the Noosa shire and Pomona being selected as a central hub saw Pomona State School become the main school of the district. Smaller schools closed with the expansion of Pomona State School and the eventual establishment of a school bus.

==== Mill School ====
Mill School was the first school to be opened in the district in 1874. Located by Lake Cootharaba two kilometres north of Elanda Point. Mill School was closed in 1892.

==== Pinbarren Creek State School ====
Pinbarren Creek State School was opened as a provisional school on 22 February 1905 and upgraded in 1908. The school closed in July 1939 just after the start of the Second World War.

==== Cooloothin Creek State School ====
Cooloothin Creek State School was established on 16 August 1915 located on the corner of Boreen Point Road and McKinnon Drive. The school eventually closed on 31 December 1936 from low attendance.

==== Cootharaba Lake State School ====
Cootharaba Lake State School opened on 23 August 1909. Located on the corner of Kildey's road and Lake Flat road it was closed during 1943.

==== Ringtail State School ====
Ringtail State School, was opened May 1912 and closed December 1943. The school was located on Ringtail road, west of the Pomona township. The building of Ringtail state school were pulled down in 1946, before being relocated to Pomona State School as a classroom. The building was transferred into the school library.

=== 1940s expansion ===
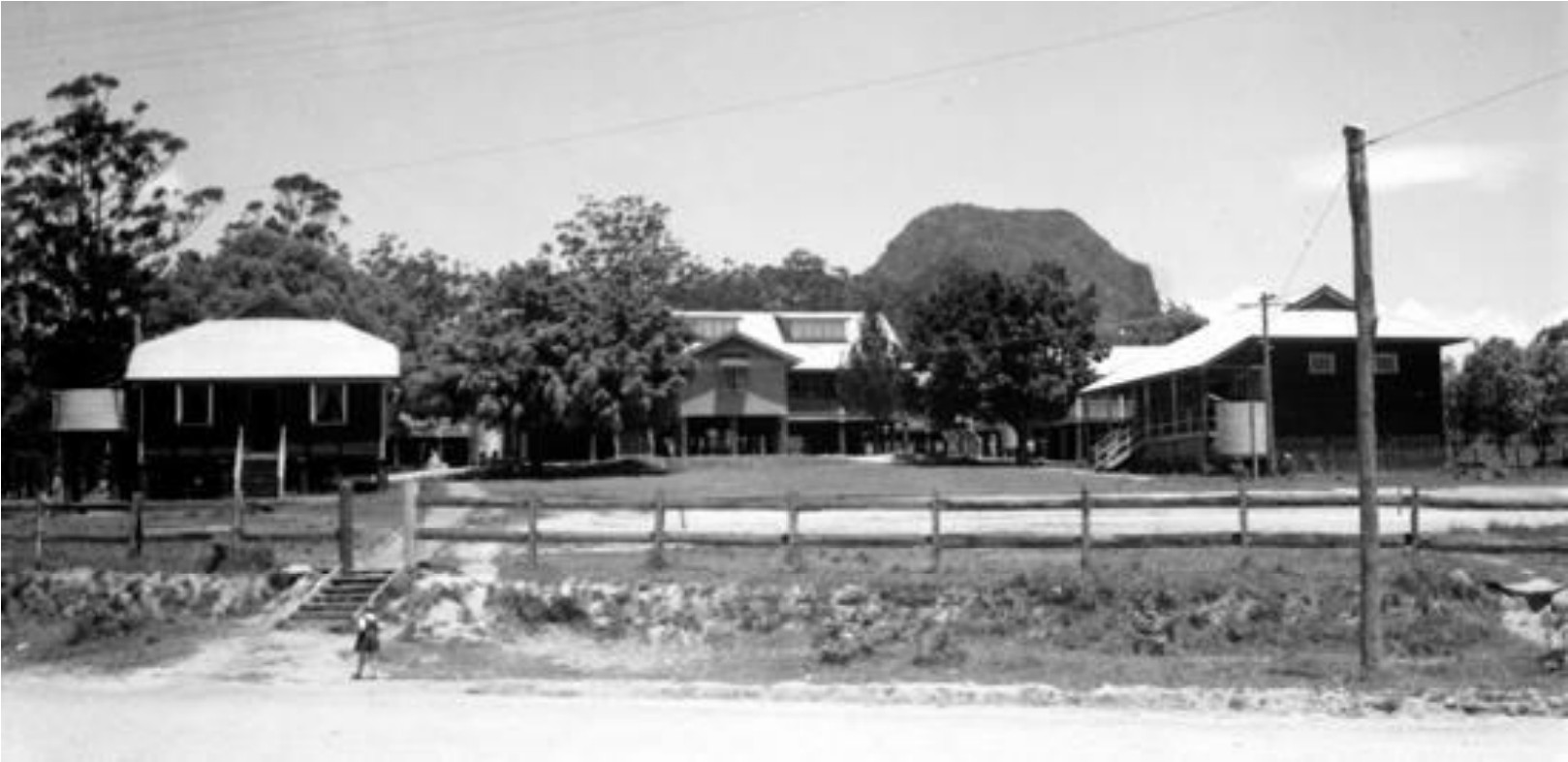
Pomona State School, 1947. Now the site of Stan Topper Park

At the conclusion of the Second World War, the focus was shifted from fighting to education. The general concern was the lack of available higher education options, most students want to go on from primary school had to enlist in a boarding school. At the end of 1944, the Department of Education established the first secondary department for a public school in Queensland. The addition of 432 secondary students to the school became overcrowded, the remaining building's from the various local schools that had closed over the previous 30 years were relocated to Pomona State School to help accommodate the extra students and staff.

The vocational study program which had been in place since 1925, had 146 enrolled students in 1950. 1947 saw some ease to the large number of students attending the school when St Patrick's Convent primary school was opened in Pomona. St Patrick's convent was eventually closed and burnt down in 2011 by Arson.

=== Ellis estate ===
Pomona State School was moved to a new site called Ellis Estate. The new site would provide more room for the school's eventual growth in the future. Ellis estate was located on what is today, 74 Station Street. The new school site was officially opened on 9 October 1976 by The Hon. C.A. Wharton, MLA the minister for Aboriginal and Islander's Advancement and Fisheries.

The new site featured most of the original buildings including some new ones. The D.A. Lowe memorial library was one of the new buildings, it was heavily renovated in 2012/13 as part of the Queensland governments better schools program.

One of the main buildings at the old site, which contained the principals office was kept on site for use as the pre-school. The pre-school was eventually moved to the new site joining the other grades, the building was then taken over by the Kindergarten. The Kindergarten, still occupying the building is the last remaining onsite. The original site is today used as a main feature in the Pomona community as the Stan Topper Park. A portion of the park was taken over by the State Emergency Service, which operate from a complex attached to the original courtyard of the Pomona State School.

=== Cooroora Secondary College ===
The secondary department of Pomona State School, having been established in 1944 was relocated to its own site. The newly named Cooroora Secondary College was established in 1996 at 120 Summit Road. The college was intended to make the grades 8–12 available to the local population. Grades 8–12 was already available at Noosa District State High School however was too far for some families.

The college was purpose built around a paved courtyard, with ample free land on its grounds. The school was transferred to Noosa District State High School at the beginning of the 2006 school year, as part of the state government's school amalgamation program. The college was renamed Noosa District State High School – Pomona Campus at the start of 2006. Grade 10 was transferred to Noosa District SHS's Cooroy campus in preparation for transferring grade 7 to Pomona campus. Grade 7 is expected to begin at Pomona campus at the beginning of the 2015 school year.

== Principals ==
Since 1897, there have been 28 principals and 2 acting principals;

- Mary Hensley (1897)
- Gertrude Cullen (1898)
- Helen Gibson (1899–1900)
- Marguerite Manwaring (1900–1902)
- Emily Mayhew (1902–1908)
- Mary Kelly (1908)
- George Dan (1908–1932)
- Charles Mitchell (Acting 1932)
- George Dan (1932–1941)
- Alfred Horne (1941–1949)
- Lionel Stevens (1949–1951)
- Arthur Vise (1951–1952)
- Norman Adsett (1952)
- Arthur Vise (1953–1956)
- Richard Ellis (Acting 1957)
- Peter Carter (1957–1960)
- Eric Twine (1960–1962)
- Malcolme McCartney (1962–1965)
- Amos Dixon (1965–1969)
- Ronald Wright (1969–1970)
- Viacheslav Von Treifelft (1971)
- Leonard Shea (1972–1979)
- Dennis Brennan (1980–1983)
- Ronald Finney (1984–1988)
- Murray Judge (1989–1993)
- Tracey Jessie (1994–1995)
- Wade Haynes (Acting 1996)
- Peter Bradford (Acting 1997–2005)
- Mick Byrne
- Alyson Covey (2015–present)

== See also ==
- List of schools in Sunshine Coast, Queensland
