= Gilburri =

Escaped Irish convict who lived with the Wakka from 1842 to 1854

John Fahy (28 March 1814 – 23 December 1902), also known as Gilburri, was an escaped Irish convict who lived with the Wakka people of the South Burnett in Queensland, Australia.

== Convict life ==
On 11 May 1838 he was put on board the ship Clyde. The ship arrived in Sydney on 12 September 1838. Every convict on board was suffering from scurvy.

In Australia, he worked as part of the New England road-gang building Major's Line, a road from Port Macquarie to the wool-producing Walcha region. Fahy escaped from the road gang for the first time on 11 November 1841. He was captured and escaped a second time on 24 April 1842.

== Adopted by Aboriginal people, 1842 - 1854 ==
On Sunday 24 April 1842, Fahy escaped again.

Fahy reached Bunya Mountains at the triennial Bunya feast in January 1843. He was adopted by a tribe there, who scarred his body with their tribal marks. He spent twelve years with them.

Thomas Petrie writes in Tom Petrie's reminiscences of early Queensland (dating from 1837), "Two or three convicts in the old days, who escaped and lived afterwards with the blacks—James Davis ("Duramboi"), Bracefield ("Wandi"), and Fahey ("Gilbury")".

Archibald Meston writes about Gilburri in "The Genesis of Toowoomba". "'We may be fairly sure that the first white man who ever stood on Mowbullam and saw the Bunya feasts, the fights and Corroborees, was John Fahy, a life sentence prisoner. He was adopted by the local tribe, who called him. "Gillburri- the bell bird" and he remained with them – until brought to Brisbane – in December 1854."

There is another explanation to the meaning of the name Gilburri from linguist, Des Crump at Queensland State Library. He looked at the Warwick/Gidhabal wordlists, and made the assessment that gil/kil was the shortened for to die or be dead, while buri means to come back. This may well refer to Gilburri being saved by his adopted Aboriginal father who believed his dead son had been reincarnated; meaning bought back from the dead.

As an outsider, the Aboriginal people would be suspicious of John Fahy, but his life was spared by one of the oldest chiefs of that Clan. "Lie down black fella, wake up white fella", he was later to say explaining how he was thought to be the reincarnation of an old chief's son that had been killed in battle. Over time he received that clan's traditional body marking and scaring, and took the name, Gilburri; the name according to Archibald Meston means Bellbird. However the true meaning Gilburri means Bell Bird that has come back from the dead. The Totem of the dead chief's son was the Bell Bird so it also became Gilburris.

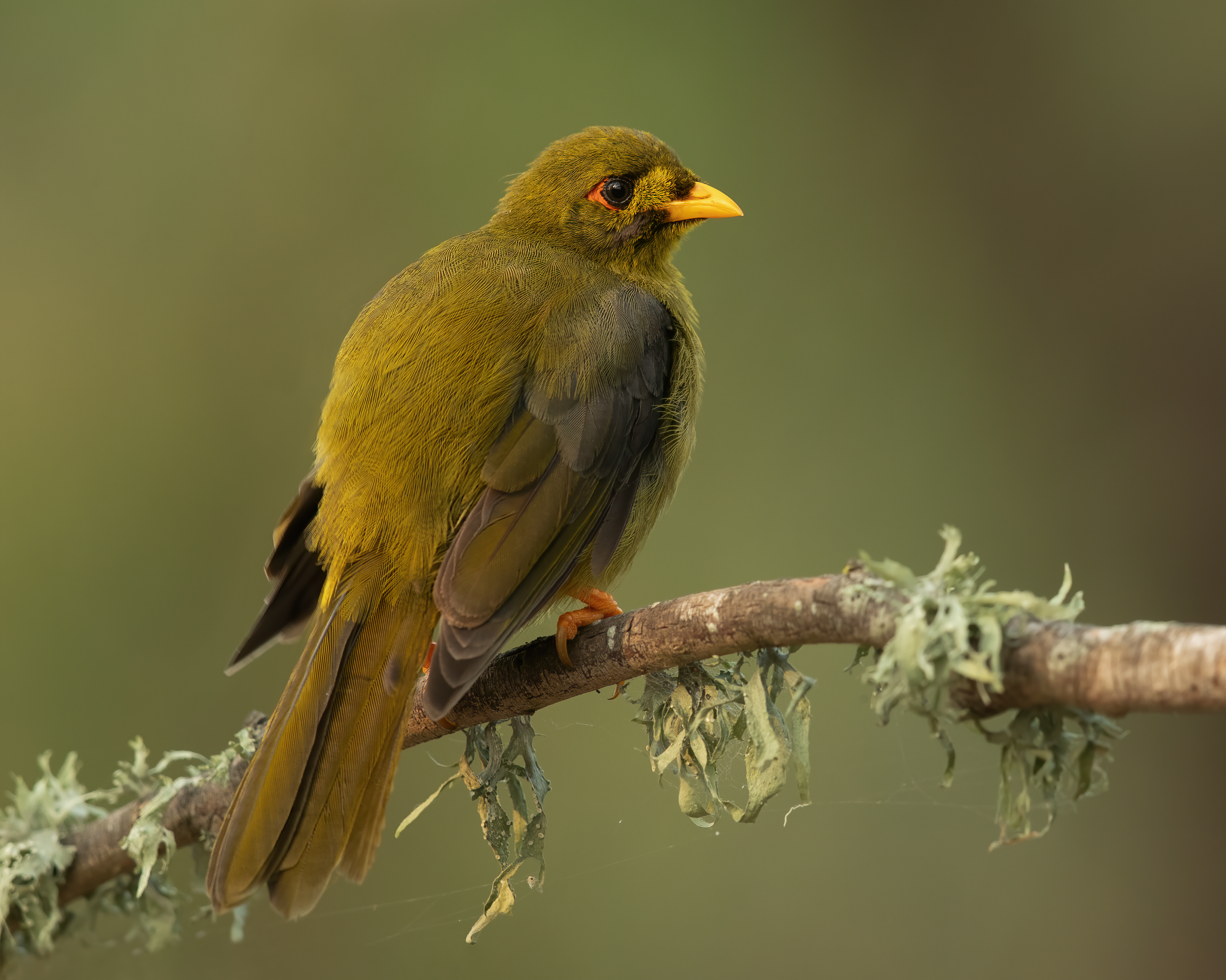
Gilburri means Bell Bird back from the dead.

Fahy had red hair, which was considered sacred amongst Aboriginal people. Fahy said he lived in the lands from Wide Bay to Dalby, from the Bunya scrub and as far up as Port Curtis.

When brought in by the Native Police in 1854, Fahy was naked, and on his body were the ornamental tattoo markings known as "Moolgarra". These unmistakable Bora marks on his breast and left shoulder, clear proof that he bad been through that ceremony, called Boorool in the Bunya country, and he referred to it in the most respectful and flattering terms. Boorool is the term used for man making ceremony.

Fahy spoke in high terms of the truthfulness and honesty of the Aboriginal people, their fondness for their children, their respect and veneration for their old people, and their politeness and kindness to each another.

He lived with the Aboriginal people occupying the country lying between Wide Bay and Dalby, called by the Aboriginal people, as Fahy says, "Bulduer". This is traditional name for Bollier, a rural locality in the Gympie Region.

Fahy understood the dialects of the several tribes occupying that tract of country. From the day of his absconding, until his apprehension, he says that he never saw a white man, or the track of one, nor had he heard among the Aboriginals of any party of white men crossing that part of the country.

Fahy was seen near current day Kenilworth. The people from that part of the Mary River around Gympie, were known as Kabi Kabi.

== Russell meets Fahy, 1844 ==
Henry Stuart Russell was leading an exploration team through Wide Bay in 1844 using a map and information he received from Duramboi (James Davies). Henry Russells team were deep in the Bunya scrub Wide Bay, when they came across a mob of about 50–60 strong. The exploring party halted within about 14 metres (15 yd) of them. Russell says the tribe neither approached nor retreated, but then one white man (Gilburri), came forward, and to Russells astonishment addressed them with, "Who are you, white fellow?"

Russel writes in his diary that Fahy was from the South and had committed some depredations, he was afraid of being shot; the tribe he was with had never seen white men before, though they had heard of them.

"We allowed this fellow to come close up, desiring him to tell the others to stand back. I stationed our native boy behind, to see that they did not steal round us. They wished to be friendly, but we declined further intercourse, upon which they gently retreated, making no attempt to molest us. Had they seen us first, they would, in all probability, have tracked us unseen, and, taking a favourable opportunity, have attacked us."

== Pine River, 1846 ==
Frederick Walker of the Native Police states that "Gilberry is always seen accompanying some of the Mrs Shannon murderers".

== Wide Bay, 1852 ==
On 25 December 1852, a report appeared in the Moreton Bay Courier stating that Mr Robinson, the person who was actively engaged in the search for the missing seamen of the wrecked ship Thomas King, ascertained from some Aboriginal people belonging to the north coast that a white man, whom they called Gilvery, was with the tribes further to the northward; Through his Aboriginal informants, Mr Robinson urged Gilburri to come into Brisbane, telling him that if he did not the Native Police would be sent after him. Gilburri replied that "he would not come, and did not care for the Native Police"; indicating that he and the Aboriginal people could easily avoid them by going into the Bunya Scrub. He is described as being a tall and powerful man without clothing.

== Captured by native police, 1854 ==
One evening, a little before sunset, Lt. Bligh, of the Native Police and his troopers came galloping up to the station and surrounded all the blacks, male and female, also the blacks that were in constant work on the station, and handcuffed them all around a large gum tree all that night. His object in doing so was that he (Bligh) was after a white man (Gilburri) who had been living with the blacks some 'time; and this white man was supposed to be amongst the, blacks at the Bunya Bunya Scrub, about 16 miles from Barambah Station.

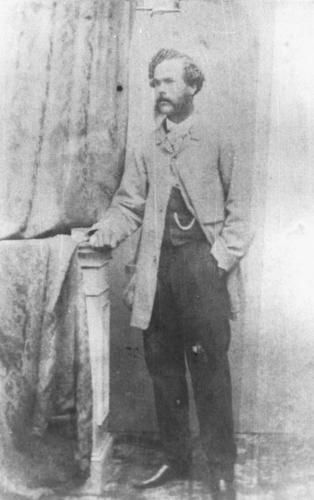
John O'Connell Bligh captured Fahy in 1854

On 11 October 1854, Walker referred to his report from 2 January 1854, of a collision between the Wide Bay Aboriginal people and the Native Police when the group had resisted the passing of the police at Obi Creek. The cause of the collision had been unknown. Although a wanted Aboriginal man named Durobberee was present, Walker had not thought this sufficient. The Aboriginal people easily escaped. Walker later reported he had discovered that the real reason was to prevent the police from observing a runaway convict named Gilberry. Walker wrote that he had arranged a plan for his capture. It had appeared strange to Walker that none of the patrol parties had ever discovered the tracks of this man as the track of a white man was different from that of an Aborigine. However, this could be explained as some of the women followed Gilburri and covered his tracks.

On 20 December 1854, Sub-Lieutenant Bligh reported to Marshall that after receiving information that the escaped convict Fahy, was encamped with Aboriginal people at Ubee Ubee flats at Mary River. They were sixteen miles from Barambah Station. He searched the camp and found him. Bligh had taken Fahy and brought him to Brisbane and delivered him into the charge of the constabulary there. John Fahy did not speak English for two days.

"John Fahy was very difficult to track as his women would cover his footprints. He was always seen accompanying the murderers of Mrs. Shannon" — John O'Connell Bligh (Dec 1854). (Note: According to Libby Connors book Warrior the murderers of Mrs Shannon included Dundalli, Oumulli, Billy Barlow, Stinkabed, Mickelo, Burra, Dunroburri, Millbong Jemmy, DickBen.)

Chief Commissioner of Lands Arthur E. Halloran mentions Gilburri in his 1854 Report on Aborigines. "During my last journey to inspect runs, in a distant and unoccupied part of the District a white man, known as Gilburri, who for the last fifteen years has been living among the Aborigines, and who is said to have instigated them to commit depredations was fortunately captured by Lieutenant Bligh and his Native Police who were with me. The circumstance caused great excitement amongst the Blacks who hung about us in considerable numbers on the mountains during our stay".

== A.C Gregory expedition, 1855 - 1856 ==
Fahy was sentenced to 12 months hard labour for escaping in 1842. After three months he was scouted by explorer A.C Gregory who offered him a pardon if he acts as a bush guide. Gregory was planning to find Ludwig Leichhardt and explore the Northern interior. Fahy accepts the offer and is released from Cockatoo Island. He leaves for Brisbane with Gregory on 18 July 1855.

"There is also a man named FAHY, a prisoner from Cockatoo Island, who is expected to be useful. It may be remembered that this man was for a long time living in a state of barbarism with the aboriginal blacks, in the neighbourhood of the Bunya Mountains, and that he was captured by Lieutenant BLIGH, of the Native Police."

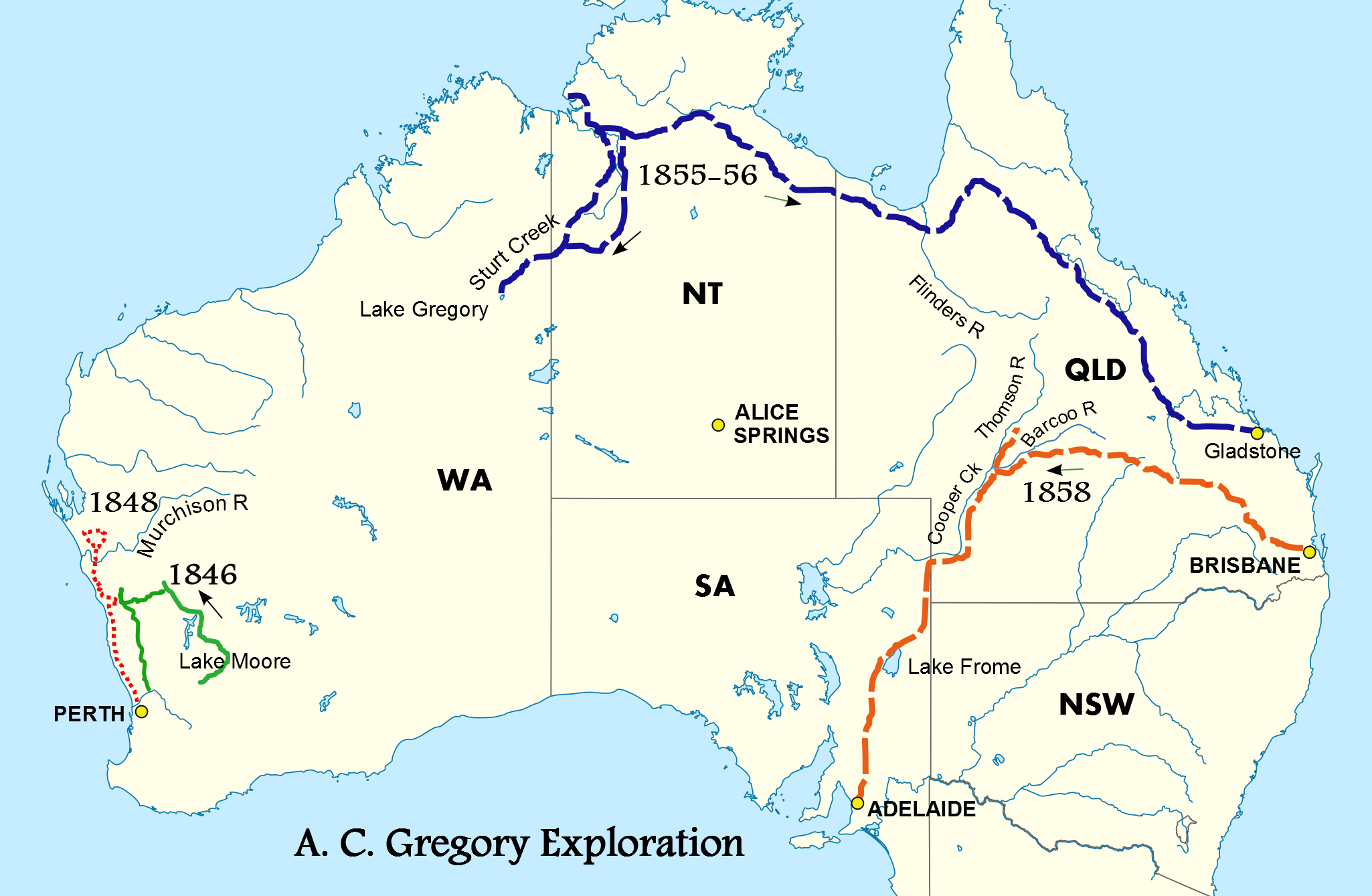
Gregory Expedition. Fahy follow Blue line

Gregory only mentions Fahy a few times in his journal.

19 November 1855 - "Fahey is on the sick list"

21 November 1855. - "Fahey, being convalescent, was employed as cook"

2 April 1856 - "At 6.45 am started from the depot with Messrs. H. Gregory, Baines, and John Fahey, taking four riding and two pack horses, carrying eighteen days' rations, etc"

5 April 1856 - "Fahey obtained a large quantity of mussels from the pools in the creek; they proved an excellent addition to our supper, though rather deficient in flavour."

19 May 1856 - "Fahey and Selby burning charcoal and general camp duties."

== Pardoned, 1857 ==
Fahy received a pardon on 27 April 1857 on the condition that he could not return to Ireland or England.
