= Belli Park, Queensland =

Belli Park
- Suburb
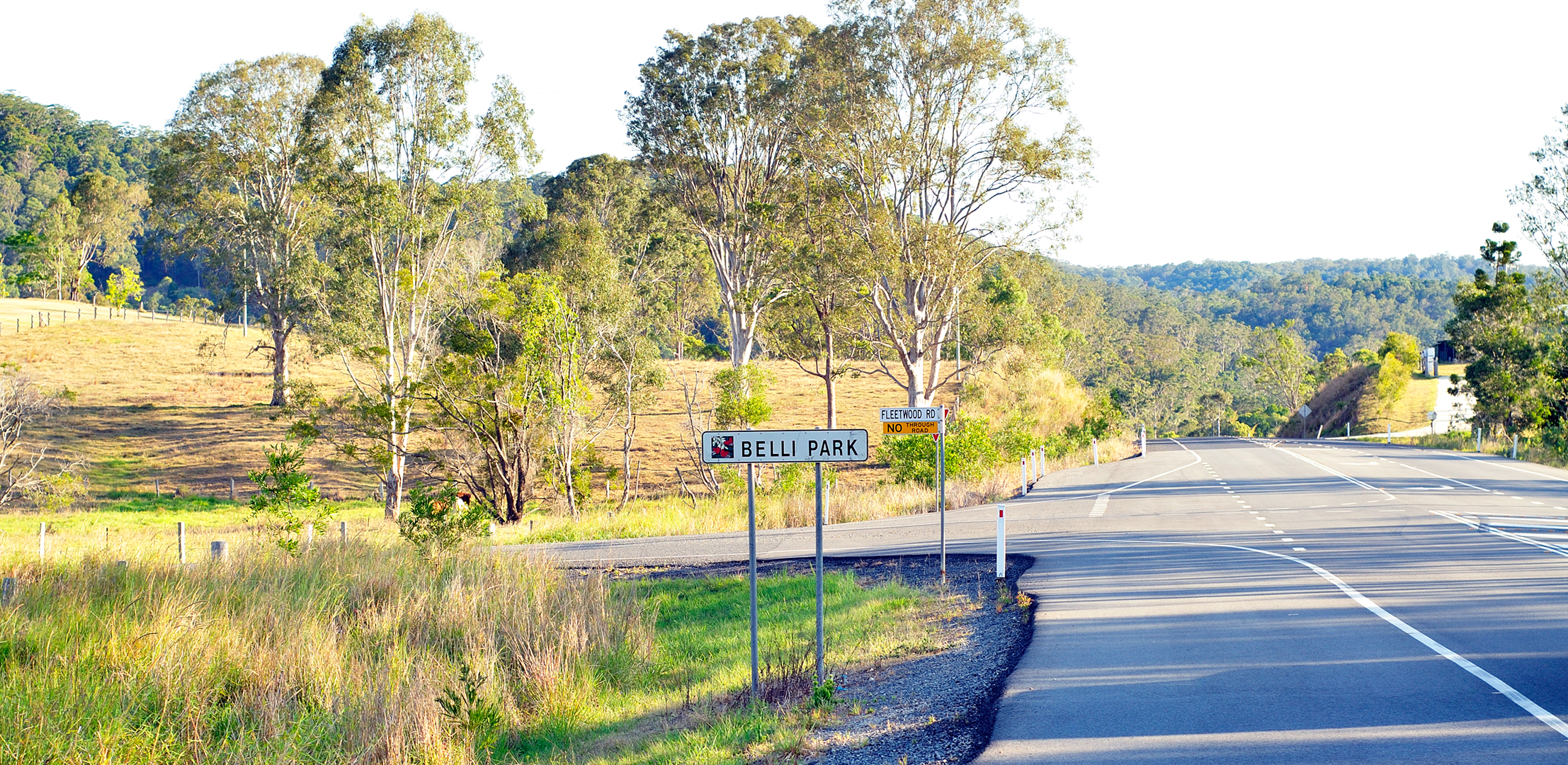
- Belli Park (2013)

- Interactive map of Belli Park
- Coordinates: 26.5169°S 152.8169°E
- Country: Australia
- State: Queensland
- City: Sunshine Coast
- LGA: Sunshine Coast Region
- Location: 15.9 km (9.9 mi) WSW of Eumundi; 18.1 km (11.2 mi) SW of Cooroy; 34.6 km (21.5 mi) NW of Nambour; 61.2 km (38.0 mi) NNW of Caloundra; 142 km (88 mi) N of Brisbane

Government
  - State electorate: Nicklin
  - Federal division: Fairfax

Area
  - Total: 81.2 km^{2} (31.4 sq mi)

Population
  - Total: 724 (2021 census)
  - Density: 8.916/km^{2} (23.093/sq mi)
- Time zone: UTC+10:00 (AEST)
- Postcode: 4562
Suburbs around Belli Park
| Carters Ridge | Ridgewood | Cooroy |
| Bollier | Belli Park | Eerwah Vale |
| Moy Pocket | Gheerulla | Cooloolabin |

Belli Park is a rural locality in the Sunshine Coast Region, Queensland, Australia. In the 2021 census, Belli Park had a population of 724 people.

== Geography ==
Kenilworth Road is the main road (and also a popular tourist drive) that connects Belli Park to its nearest townships, being Eumundi (to the east) and Kenilworth (to the west).

The Belli Creek and the Belli Park area is a part of the Mary River catchment.

== History ==
The locality takes its name from Belli Creek, which derives its name from the Kabi language word belai or billah referring to the she oak tree (Casuarina glauca)

Belli Park Provisional School opened on 20 January 1908. On 1 January 1909 it became Belli Park State School. It closed on 31 December 1963.

== Demographics ==
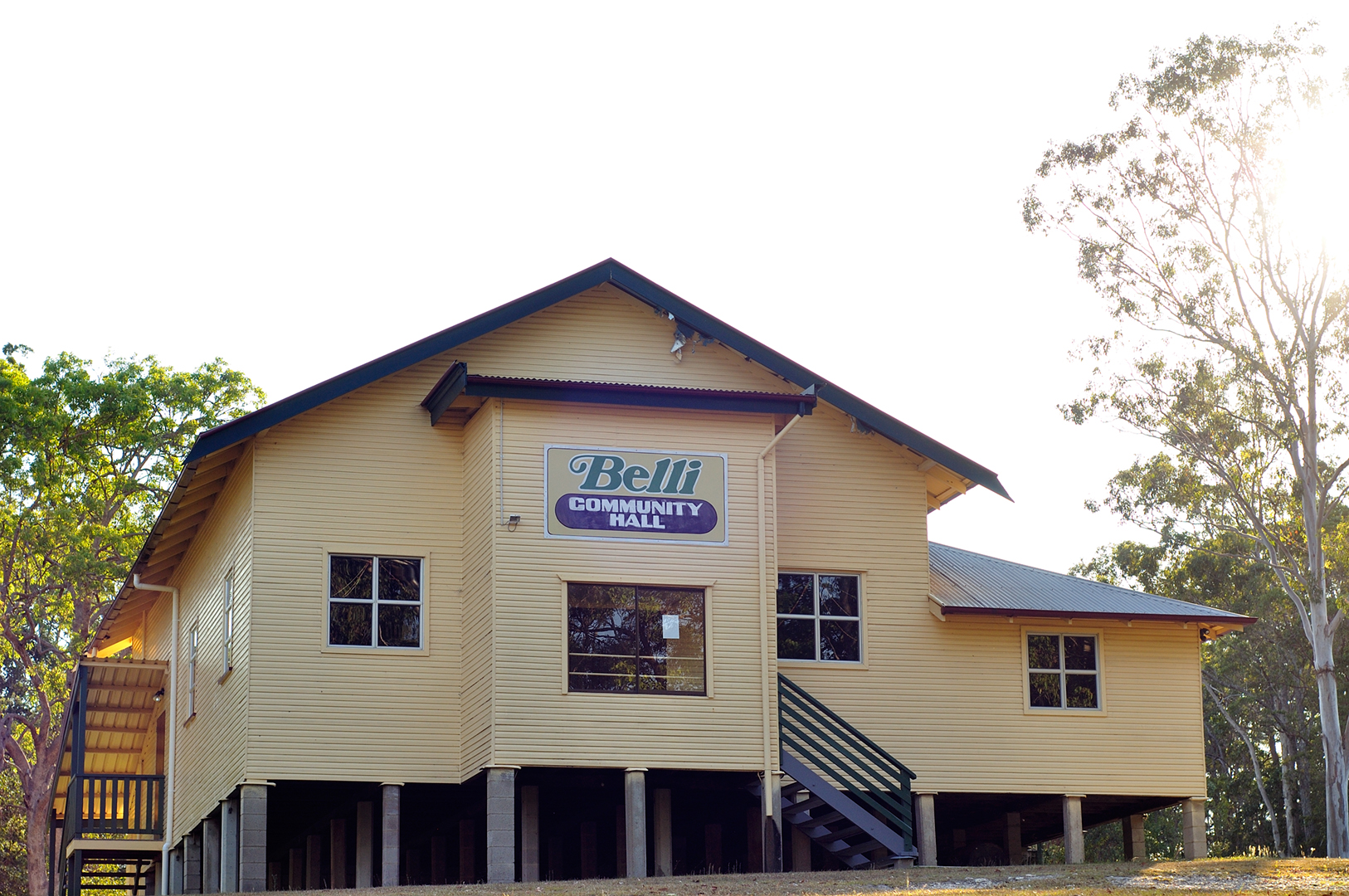
Belli Community Hall

In the 2011 census, Belli Park recorded a population of 584 people, 50.9% female and 49.1% male. The median age of the Belli Park population was 44 years, 7 years above the national median of 37. 74.6% of people living in Belli Park were born in Australia. The other top responses for country of birth were England 7.4%, New Zealand 2.6%, Scotland 1%, Germany 0.9%, Netherlands 0.9%. 90.7% of people spoke only English at home; the next most common languages were 1% German, 0.9% Gilbertese, 0.5% Polish, 0.5% Dutch.

In the 2016 census, Belli Park had a population of 679 people.

In the 2021 census, Belli Park had a population of 724 people.

== Education ==
There are no schools in Belli Park. The nearest government primary schools are:

- Cooroy State School in neighbouring Cooroy to the north-east
- Eumundi State School in Eumundi to the north-east
- Yandina State School in Yandina to the south-east
- Kenilworth State Community College in Kenilworth to the south-west
- Mary Valley State College in Imbil to the west
- Federal State School in Federal to the north-west

The nearest government secondary schools are:

- Noosa District State High School (junior campus) in Pomona to the north
- Noosa District State High School (senior campus) in neighbouring Cooroy to the north-east
- Nambour State College in Nambour to the south-east
- Mary Valley State College (to Year 10) in Imbil to the west

== Amenities ==
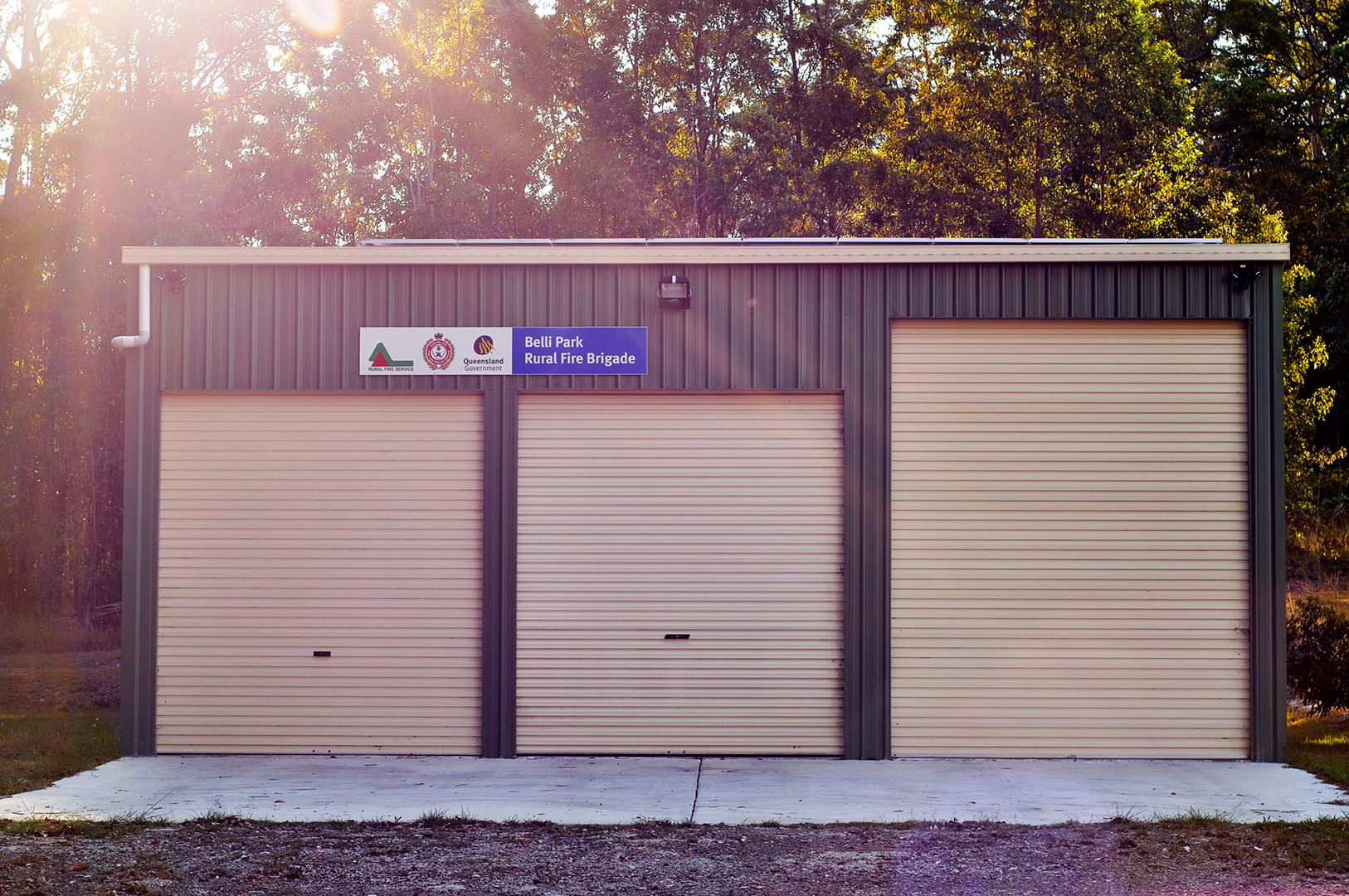
Belli Rural Fire Brigade

Belli Park has a community hall and a Rural Fire Brigade.
