= Moy Pocket, Queensland =

Moy Pocket
- Suburb
- Interactive map of Moy Pocket
- Coordinates: 26.5277°S 152.7430°E
- Country: Australia
- State: Queensland
- LGA: Gympie Region
- Location: 34.2 km (21.3 mi) SW of Cooroy; 44.9 km (27.9 mi) S of Gympie; 55.6 km (34.5 mi) NNW of Maleny; 158 km (98 mi) N of Brisbane

Government
  - State electorate: Gympie
  - Federal division: Wide Bay

Area
  - Total: 18.1 km^{2} (7.0 sq mi)

Population
  - Total: 120 (2021 census)
  - Density: 6.63/km^{2} (17.2/sq mi)
- Time zone: UTC+10:00 (AEST)
- Postcode: 4574
Suburbs around Moy Pocket
Brooloo	Bollier	Belli Park
Brooloo	Moy Pocket	Belli Park
Kenilworth	Gheerulla	Gheerulla

Moy Pocket is a rural locality in the Gympie Region, Queensland, Australia. In the 2021 census, Moy Pocket had a population of 120 people.

== Geography ==
The locality is bounded to the north by Spiller Road. The Mary River forms the south-eastern boundary of the locality, then meanders through the centre of the locality, then becomes the north-eastern boundary of the locality.

Moy Pocket has the following mountains:

- Bloolou in the west of the locality (26.5177°S 152.7214°E) rising to 368 metres (1,207 ft) above sea level
- Mount Kenilworth on the south-western boundary with Brooloo (26.5169°S 152.7541°E) rising to 529 metres (1,736 ft)

Moy Pocket Road is the main route through the locality, entering from the south (Gheerulla) and exiting to the north-west (Brooloo).

The land use is a mix of grazing on native vegetation and irrigated modified pastures with some rural residential housing.

== History ==
The locality appears to take its name from a farm operated by Peter Henry Sutton circa 1911 in the pocket of Mary River at the end of Suttons Lane in the south-east of the present locality (26.5327°S 152.7579°E).

== Demographics ==
In the 2016 census, Moy Pocket had a population of 115 people.

In the 2021 census, Moy Pocket had a population of 120 people.

== Education ==
There are no schools in Moy Pocket. The nearest government primary schools are Mary Valley State College in Imbil to the north-west and Kenilworth State Community College in neighbouring Kenilworth to the south-west.

The nearest government secondary schools are:

- Mary Valley State College (to Year 10) in Imbil to the north-west
- Gympie State High School (to Year 12) in Gympie to the north
- Noosa District State High School (to Year 12) which has its junior campus in Pomona and its senior campus on Cooroy, both to the north-east
- Maleny State High School (to Year 12) in Maleny to the south-east
