= Pterostylis vitrea =

Glassy leafy greenhood

Scientific classification
- Kingdom: Plantae
- Clade: Tracheophytes
- Clade: Angiosperms
- Clade: Monocots
- Order: Asparagales
- Family: Orchidaceae
- Subfamily: Orchidoideae
- Tribe: Cranichideae
- Genus: Pterostylis
- Species: P. vitrea

Binomial name
- Pterostylis vitrea (D.L.Jones) Bostock

Synonyms
- Bunochilus vitreus D.L.Jones

Species of orchid

Pterostylis vitrea, commonly known as the glassy leafy greenhood, is a plant in the orchid family Orchidaceae and is endemic to Queensland. Non-flowering plants have a rosette of leaves on a short stalk. Flowering plants lack a rosette but have up to seven translucent green flowers with darker green lines on a flowering stem with between five and seven stem leaves.

== Description ==
Pterostylis vitrea is a terrestrial, perennial, deciduous herb with an underground tuber. Non-flowering plants have a rosette of between three and six leaves, each leaf 10–40 mm (0.4–2 in) long and 3–5 mm (0.1–0.2 in) wide on a stalk 30–60 mm (1–2 in) high. Flowering plants have up to seven translucent green flowers with darker markings on a flowering spike 150–400 mm (6–20 in) high. The flowering spike has between five and seven stem leaves which are 25–90 mm (1–4 in) long and 2–4 mm (0.08–0.2 in) wide. The flowers are 13–17 mm (0.5–0.7 in) long, 6–8 mm (0.2–0.3 in) wide. The dorsal sepal and petals are joined to form a hood over the column with the dorsal sepal having a brown tip. The lateral sepals turn downwards and are 12–15 mm (0.5–0.6 in) long, 6–8 mm (0.2–0.3 in) wide, joined to each other for more than half their length with brown tips. The labellum is 5–7 mm (0.2–0.3 in) long, 2–3 mm (0.08–0.1 in) wide and cream-coloured with a dark stripe along its mid-line. It flowers from April to July.

== Taxonomy and naming ==
The glassy leafy greenhood was first formally described in 2006 by David Jones who gave it the name Bunochilus vitreus and published the description in Australian Orchid Research from a specimen collected near Maleny. In 2008, Peter Bostock changed the name to Pterostylis vitrea. The specific epithet (vitrea) is a Latin word meaning "glassy", referring to the glassy appearance of the flowers.

== Distribution and habitat ==
Pterostylis vitrea grows in wet forest and on rainforest margins, sometimes near rocky cliffs between the Kenilworth and the McPherson Range.
