= Kenilworth Homestead =

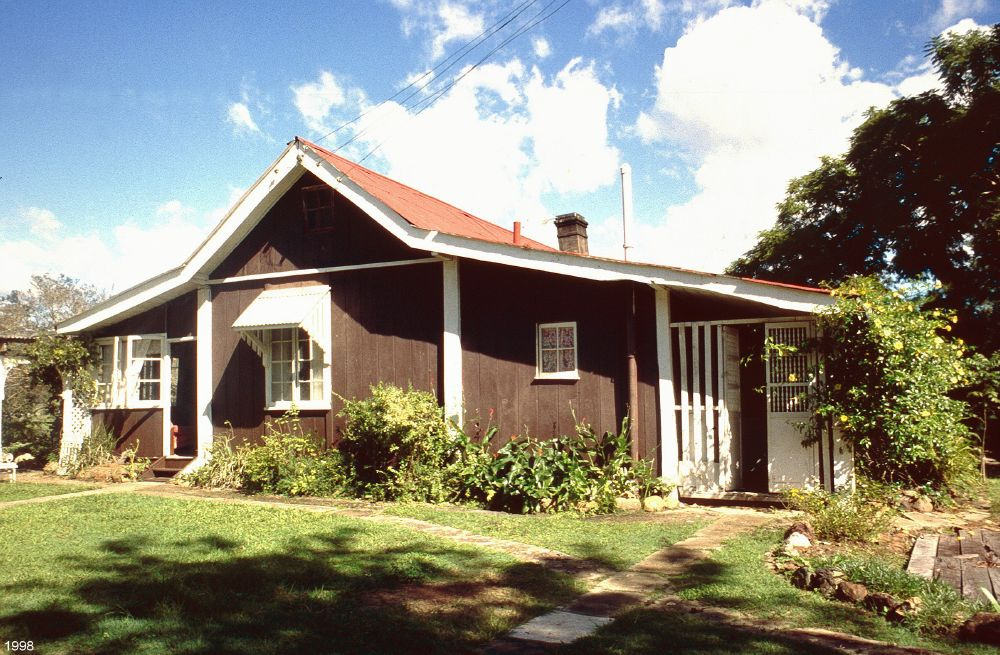
- Kenilworth Homestead, 1998

- Location within Queensland Location within Australia
- 26.5826°S 152.7336°E
- Location: Eumundi Kenilworth Road, Kenilworth, Sunshine Coast Region, Queensland, Australia

History
- Design period: 1840s - 1860s (mid-19th century)
- Built: c. 1865

Queensland Heritage Register
- Official name: Kenilworth Homestead, Kenilworth Station
- Type: state heritage (built)
- Designated: 30 November 1998
- Reference no.: 602043
- Significant period: 1860s-1920s (historical); 1860s-1870s (fabric residence); 1900s (fabric barn) ongoing (social)
- Significant components: barn, headstone, graveyard, out building/s, residential accommodation - main house, trees/plantings, furniture/fittings

Kenilworth Homestead is a heritage-listed homestead at Eumundi Kenilworth Road, Kenilworth, Sunshine Coast Region, Queensland, Australia. It was built c. 1865. It was also known as Kenilworth Station. It was added to the Queensland Heritage Register on 30 November 1998.

== History ==
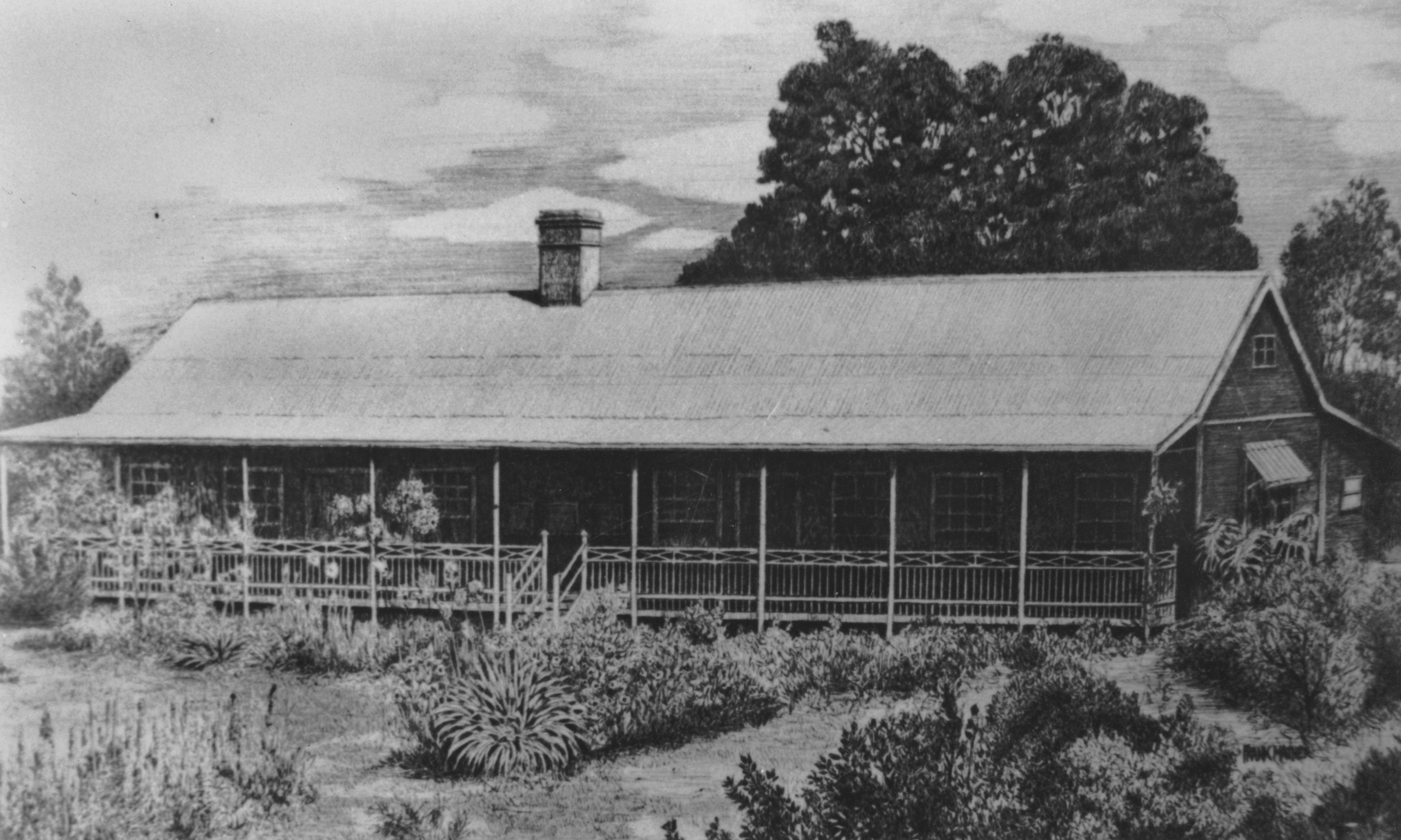
Sketch of Kenilworth Homestead ca. 1865

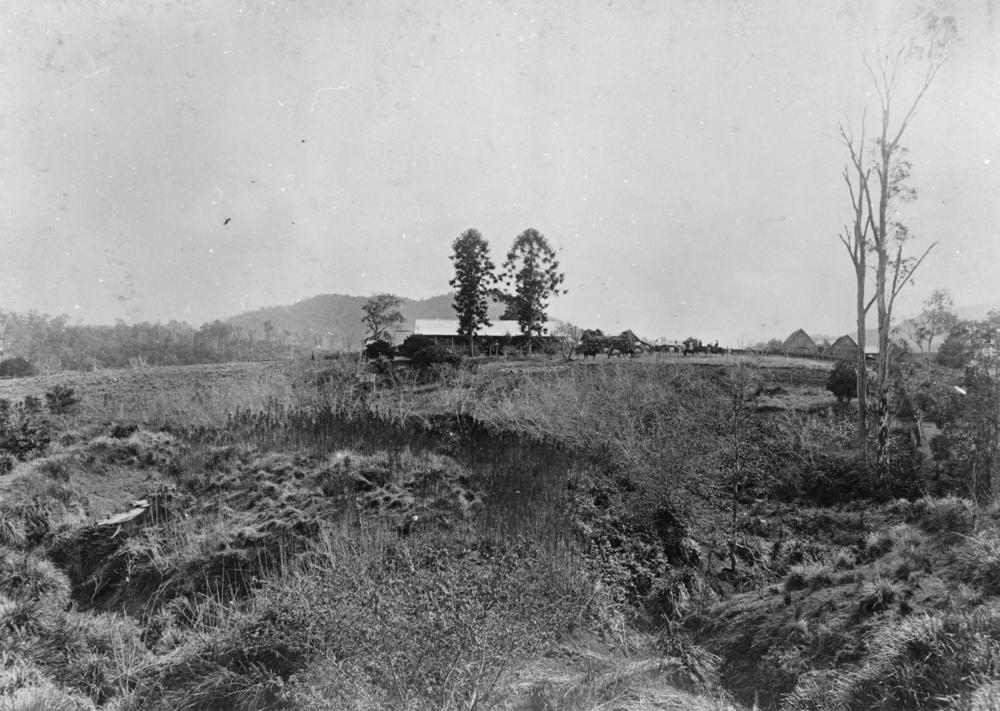
View of Kenilworth Station on the Mary River, Kenilworth, 1907

The Kenilworth Station was taken up in 1850 by Joseph Smith. A substantial timber residence was constructed on the station in about 1865 by a later and longtime owner, Isaac Moore. The Rowe family purchased the property in 1925 and have retained Kenilworth since then. During their ownership the focus of the former pastoral property has become tourist oriented.

The area of the original Kenilworth Station, along with a vast area in the Wide Bay district was initially inspected by Dr Stephen Simpson, the Commissioner of Crown Lands and Reverend Stephen Eiper in 1843. Eiper was determining the suitability of the area for establishing a German settlement, and Simpson was investigating a crime. Joining the pair on this early exploration was Richard Joseph Smith, a soldier who later became the original lessee of what was to become Kenilworth Station. The area was opened up for leasing in 1850, prior to which depasturing licenses were issued each year. Smith applied for a five-year lease of 22,000 acres (8,900 ha) on the east bank of the Mary River on 18 August 1850 on which to run about 640 cattle. On the following day Smith tendered for another 18,000-acre (7,300 ha) run, known as North Kenilworth and adjoining the northern boundary of the Kenilworth Run. Smith's tender for both runs was officially accepted on 30 April 1855 following a Commissioner's report of the area, although presumably Smith was occupying the land prior to this.

Smith retained Kenilworth Station for several years before transferring the lease to Charles Frederick Parkinson and Colin Fraser, who are believed to have been managing the station already. Parkinson and Fraser were, like Smith, ex-military and it was Parkinson or his wife who is thought to have named the run in memory of the Walter Scott novel Kenilworth. Parkinson and Fraser transferred the run to Ipswich merchant, Walter Gray in July 1860. Gray died shortly after acquiring Kenilworth and the property was transferred to Isaac Moore in 1863 who owned it for many years and is believed to be responsible for the construction of the early homestead.

Isaac Moore (1811–1903) arrived in Fryerstown on the Victorian gold fields in 1853 and ran a successful store. He then relocated to Queensland to embark on pastoral pursuits. Moore went into partnership with William Henry Baynes on the Barambah Station and following Baynes' death Baynes' interest in the station was purchased by Moore's sons. Moore was well known in the Wide Bay/Burnett district as a local politician. Moore increased the size of the Kenilworth Run to about 100 square miles by adding to it other adjacent runs including Cambroon and Cordalba which he purchased at the same time as Kenilworth.

It is believed that during the occupancy of Isaac Moore at Kenilworth from 1863 until 1875, the early homestead was constructed. The present owners of the house believe the date to be closer to 1865. The construction of the building has been attributed by descendants of the Moore family to two cabinet-makers from Orkney Islands. The high quality of the finish of the internal timber work and the unusual construction technique support this proposition. The construction technique of the principal residence will be further explained in the description section of this report but varies from other Queensland homesteads of this age in its high quality finish and absence of visible horizontal framing or bracing.

A census taken in 1871 suggests that two inhabited buildings were extant at the Kenilworth Station. It is suggested that these buildings were an original slab hut (now rebuilt) constructed by Smith and the principal residence constructed in about 1865. A survey plan, dated 14 December 1878, shows two building in approximately the position of the current residence.

In 1873 an application was made by Isaac Moore under section 14 of the Land Act 1868 to lease 400 acres (160 ha) of pastoral land on the Kenilworth Run under the pre-emption. Moore was to pay a £10 annual rental and a £7 survey fee. The 400 acres (160 ha) selected by Moore ran across the Kenilworth Station and also an adjoining station, Obi Obi. The improvements on the selection included a dwelling house worth £800, another dwelling house worth £100, stockyard and paddock fences worth £300. Although Moore paid rent for his selection from January 1873, the lease was not formalised until 20 October 1879 after an official survey.

Isaac Moore remained on his selection until 1875 when his 14 month old daughter, Henrietta, died and was buried on a hill overlooking the homestead. The management of Kenilworth was taken over by Patrick Lillis. Although some reports suggest Lillis purchased the property at some time during his management this conjecture is not supported by primary documentary evidence. Some confusion exists over the management of Kenilworth Station during the 1870s and 1880s. In 1890, still under the ownership of Isaac Moore, Duncan Beattie assumed the management of Kenilworth replacing Lillis who was experiencing serious financial problems.

In about 1901 it is believed that a large silky oak barn lined with quandong was constructed under the direction of Beattie who was renowned for the Hereford herd and thoroughbreds he raised on the Kenilworth Run. The barn is believed to have been constructed by an early timber getter and gold miner, Ned Allen using timber from the Walli Valley. The building was designed to house six stalls on each side of a large central enclosed area. A ball was held to open the building and to raise money for the Gympie Hospital.

Following the death of Isaac Moore in 1903, Kenilworth Station was passed in equal one-quarter shares to his four children Hugh Moore, Isaac John Moore, Frances Annie Moore and Emma Isabella Mary Clarke. The sons assumed the property and on Hugh Moore's death the property, still measuring 400 acres (160 ha) was transferred to Isaac John Moore.

In 1921 Kenilworth Station was subdivided and in the following year large areas of the property were sold. In 1924 the town of Kenilworth was established on a resumed part of former run and the postal services which were formerly managed at the homestead were transferred to the new town.

In 1924 a Frank Rodgers of Kenilworth became the owner of 100 acres (40 ha) of the subdivided Kenilworth Station being that part which housed the residence and barn. This was transferred to longtime owner of the property Henry Faris Rowe on 13 July 1925. Henry Rowe was married to Frances Hassall of the nearby Mount Ubi Station. In 1964 on the death of Henry Rowe the title was transferred to James William Faris Rowe who transferred the property to his son, Justyn Rowe in 1997.

During the ownership of the Rowe family Kenilworth Station has gradually changed from a working pastoral station to a museum, farm stay and school camp site. Many buildings have been constructed on the site to further this endeavour. A large timber extension was added to the eastern end of the principal residence in two stages from the 1950s. Near the principal residence has been built a slab hut based on the original slab hut of Richard Smith; a self-contained timber cottage dating from about the 1960s and an 1880s worker's cottage moved to the site from Gympie. Two small buildings; a blacksmith's store and an office administration area have been constructed adjacent to a central circular driveway. The 1901 barn has been extended and renovated. Abutting the barn is a modern concrete block stage and dormitory wing (not completed as at May 1998). Adjacent to this is a number of reconstructed timber buildings and a stockyard. The timber buildings on the site have been constructed in sympathy with the early structures.

For many years the Rowe family have been interested in understanding the history of the Gubbi Gubbi people, particularly where they were involved with Kenilworth Station. Recently reconciliation celebrations have been held by the family and the Gubbi Gubbi people.

== Description ==
Kenilworth Homestead is a large complex on about 38 hectares (94 acres) of land to which access is provided via the Eumundi-Kenilworth Road, about 3 kilometres (1.9 mi) west from Kenilworth. The land on which Kenilworth Homestead is situated undulates from a hill on the eastern side of the property toward the Mary River on the eastern side, on a bluff overlooking which is the homestead complex, incorporating the early house. Access roads run north through the property providing access to the homestead as well as a complex of outbuildings, incorporating the barn.

The homestead complex, incorporates a number of buildings, structures, gardens and established tree planting. The c. 1865 homestead is centrally located with a 20th-century extension to the east. To the west of the homestead is a reconstructed slab hut, a nineteenth century timber cottage moved to the site from Gympie and a 20th-century timber kitchen/residence. The outbuildings, to the east of the homestead complex, include a 1901 silky oak barn with extensions and a number of other timber buildings all constructed during the occupation of the Rowe family.

The complex houses two important early buildings relating to the pastoral workings of the place; the principal residence dating from about 1865 and a 1901 barn. Also related to the early history of the site are a number of large established trees and a small cemetery overlooking the property from a hill on the eastern end of the site.

The principal residence is a single storeyed timber building facing north with a rectangular plan and verandahs lining the two long sides. Part of the verandah has been closed in creating additional rooms. The main gabled roof is clad with corrugated iron and reduces in pitch at the verandah line. The timber construction technique is unusual, without visible horizontal support and using very high quality and well finished cedar slabs. The foundations of the building are a system of load-bearing bed logs that support floor joists and tongue and groove timber floors. The single skinned wall construction comprises regular 2-inch (51 mm) thick cedar boards measuring about 10 inches (250 mm) wide, joined with beaded tongue and groove joints and fixed into the foundations below the floor boards and into the ceiling joists above the ceiling, resulting in the absence of visible horizontal timber members. Doorways and windows are formed within frames of thinner beaded cedar boards with beading.

The building is arranged with a row of five central principal rooms running parallel to the long sides of the house. These rooms are lined on the north side by an open verandah and on the south side with a line of smaller rooms to the south of which is another partially enclosed verandah. Without halls the rooms provide direct access to each other through hand crafted panelled and moulded single doors and a series of "secret" doors made from the cedar wall slabs. The interior joinery, including all of the walls, ceilings and floors, is stained but not painted. The doors which lead from the principal rooms to the northern verandah are also quite unusual, not being of standard size or proportion. One of the door openings is fitted with wide French lights where the door sleeves are divided with fine timber mullions into a number of square panes. These square panes are repeated on the windows in the house and on several half glazed doors.

Internally the building has significant furniture and fittings, including several carved timber sideboards, an early light fitting, Aboriginal artefacts given to the owners of the homestead by the Gubbi Gubbi people in commemoration of a long association, and other documents including photographs. Two of the main rooms, the drawing and the dining rooms share masonry fireplaces which a substantial square planned chimney services.

A timber one and two storeyed extension wing, dating from the 1950s, abuts the south-eastern corner of the house from the kitchen. Despite the substantial size of the wing, it is partially concealed by the large fig tree to the south of the house. The wing reflects the massing, form, proportion and fenestration patterns of the principal house, with a gabled corrugated iron clad roof and door and window openings similar to those of the house. To the west of the house is a car shade, to the north of which is a reconstructed slab hut, constructed, like many of the other reconstructed buildings on the site from building materials from earlier dismantled outbuildings. To the west of the slab hut and diagonally placed facing north west is a timber worker's cottage with pyramidal roof and verandahs which was relocated from Gympie.

Large established trees and established gardens surround the homestead complex, significantly a c. 1901 fig tree to the south of the house, a garden area to the north of the house and several other trees in the vicinity.

The 1901 barn is part of a large complex of outbuildings. It is one storeyed timber structure constructed from single skinned horizontal timber weatherboards on a timber frame with internal bracing. The building comprises a large central room, flanked to the east and west by a row of six smaller stalls. Dividing the stalls from the central room is horizontal boarding which is separated at a high level to produce horizontal cavities between the boards. The stalls have been internally lined with fibrous cement sheeting and fitted with bunk beds. The roof of the building is clad with corrugated iron and is gabled with a shallower pitch over the two rows of stalls. The barn is now on a concrete slab and this forms a walkway around the building. Abutting the southern end of the barn is an open are constructed from recycled materials and abutting this is a modern concrete block covered stage area and dormitories which are in the final stages of completion.

The other outbuildings in this area include a stockyard and house; toilet blocks, and a small building now used as a chapel. These buildings are constructed from concrete block and timber and all have corrugated iron clad roofs.

To the west of the buildings on the site is a large hill only the eastern side of which is on the property. Near the crest of the hill is a small enclosed cemetery, housing a grave with three headstones; Henrietta Lillian Josephine (1873–1875); Alma Blanche Claudine Beattie (1895) and unmarked rock said to mark the grave of a small aboriginal girl. Alongside this formal grave is a large cairn with a memorial with a plaque in memory of the Gubbi Gubbi people who also used this area as a burial ground. Between the buildings and the hill are substantial trees, a pair of bunya pine trees and a pair of hoop pine trees.

== Heritage listing ==
Kenilworth Homestead was listed on the Queensland Heritage Register on 30 November 1998 having satisfied the following criteria.

The place is important in demonstrating the evolution or pattern of Queensland's history.

Kenilworth Homestead, on one of the earliest stations established in the Gympie district, demonstrates the pattern of development in the area from nineteenth century pastoralism. The resumption of a large part of Kenilworth during the 1920s, and the subsequent division into smaller farming properties and the nearby town of Kenilworth, is important in demonstrating the pattern of land use and occupancy in rural Queensland during the early twentieth century.

The place demonstrates rare, uncommon or endangered aspects of Queensland's cultural heritage.

The principal residence, thought to date from about 1865, is an uncommon and rare example of an early timber house demonstrating unusually high craftsmanship and quality of finish.

The place has potential to yield information that will contribute to an understanding of Queensland's history.

The place has the potential to provide archaeological evidence of building construction techniques from the mid nineteenth century and of the formerly extensive pastoral station complex. As evidenced by recent reconciliation ceremonies Kenilworth Homestead has a long association with and strong importance for the local Aboriginal community, in particular the Gubbi Gubbi people, and has the potential to reveal further evidence of this association.

The place is important in demonstrating the principal characteristics of a particular class of cultural places.

The residence and the stables, with associated grounds including the gardens, paddocks, cemetery and driveway, provide a good example of a mid-nineteenth century pastoral run.

The place is important because of its aesthetic significance.

The buildings and grounds have aesthetic value, enhanced by their picturesque natural setting incorporating the Mary River and surrounding ranges. The gardens, trees and grounds surrounding the buildings contribute to their setting.

The place is important in demonstrating a high degree of creative or technical achievement at a particular period.

The construction technique of single skinned wide vertical slabs with tongue and groove beaded joints with concealed framing is unusual and demonstrates the skills of the two cabinet makers thought to be involved with the construction of the building.

The place has a strong or special association with a particular community or cultural group for social, cultural or spiritual reasons.

The homestead is of social value for its long association with the local community and as the earliest surviving homestead in the area.
