= Mary Valley Art Festival =

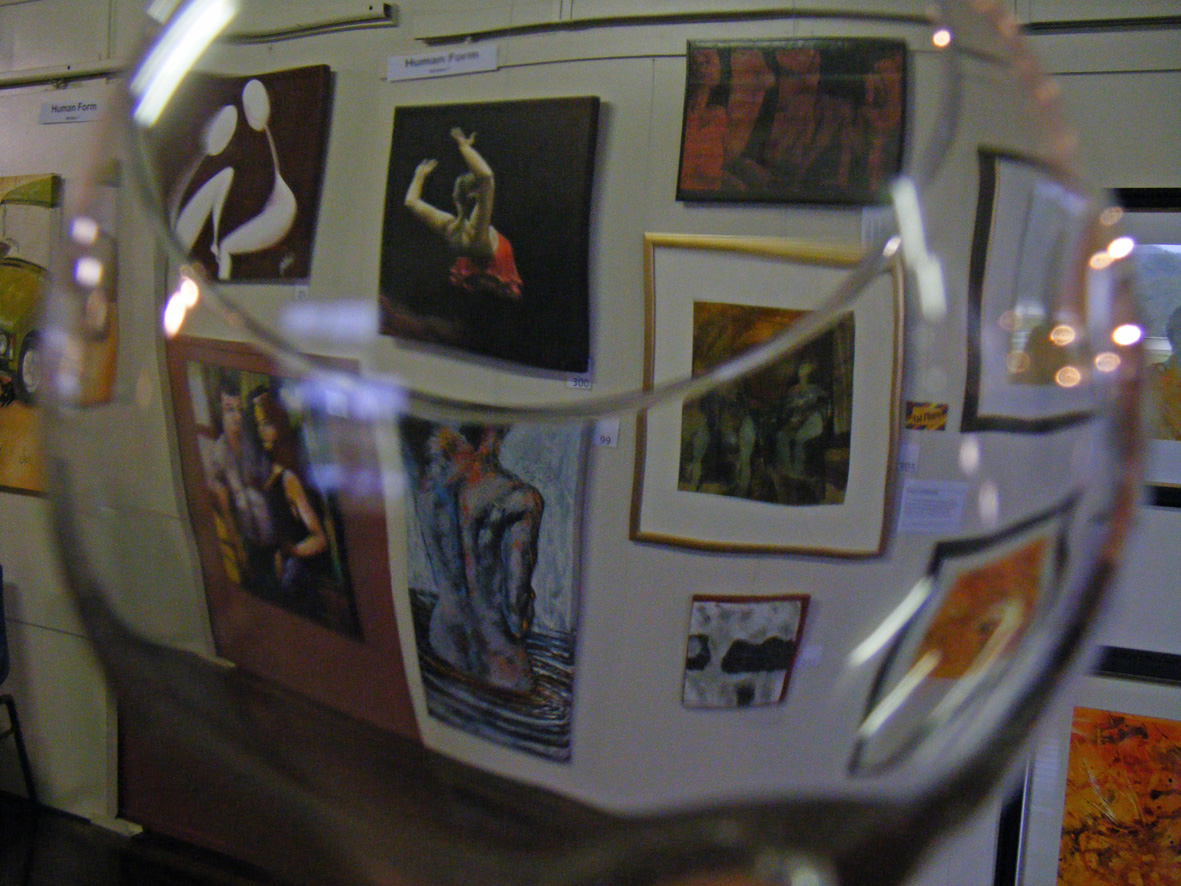
- A creative view of the 2010 Mary Valley Art Festival
- Frequency: annual
- Locations: Imbil, Queensland, Australia
- Years active: 2000 - present
- Participants: ~300
- Website: www.maryvalleyartfestival.org

The annual Mary Valley Art Festival is a three-day festival event held in the rural village of Imbil, near Gympie in South East Queensland, Australia.

The festival was started in 2000 and is held at the Imbil Public Hall in July each year. Prizes are awarded across a number of categories including novice, animalia, still life, human form and abstract amongst others. Total prize money topped $5,000 in 2011, and over $100,000 worth of artworks were shown during the 2010 festival.

Visitors and exhibitors alike enjoy the opening night of the festival, where they can take the opportunity to view the exhibition and mix with other artists, to a backdrop of nibbles and music. The People's Choice Awards are held at the end of the weekend festival, when the favourite entry by popular vote is revealed.

== Origins ==
The festival was belonged to the Mary Valley Show. When it outgrew the pavilion at the annual show, organisers split the arts festival from the event but remained with the Mary Valley Show Society.

== "Mary Valley Alive" 10/10 ==
The festival received statewide recognition in 2011 for its 2010 commemorative project "Mary Valley Alive" 10/10, when committee representatives presented the 10/10 project as a case study at the Queensland Regional Arts and Culture Conference - artspoken 2011 - in Bundaberg.

Mary Valley Alive was a collaborative project developed and managed by Heinke Butt to celebrate the 10th anniversary of the Mary Valley Art Festival.

The project's theme was rebuilding place and community through the arts, and the Mary Valley Alive project celebrated 10 years of the Mary Valley Art Festival (MVAF), recognising the need to tell stories of celebration, environment, transitioning communities, community renewal and reclaiming place after the scrapping of the controversial Traveston Crossing Dam proposal.

Mrs Butt, as the artistic director, developed a themed major art work utilising 113 individual pieces from selected participants from across the Sunshine Coast, Wide Bay Burnett and Gympie regions.

A special booklet reproduced every art work and written story and the additional production of a selection of postcards highlighting specific artists also provided professional development opportunities for the participating artists.

The fact that Artspoken Queensland Regional Arts and Culture Conference in 2011 recognised the Mary Valley Alive project with a place on its program recognises its importance as a community project as well as an art and cultural event.

== See also ==
- List of festivals in Australia
