= Frederick Walker (native police commandant) =

- Born: 14 April 1820; Hampshire, England
- Died: 19 November 1866 (aged 45 or 46); Floraville Station, Colony of Queensland
- Other name: Morum Billak
- Occupations: Station manager, police officer, explorer
- Title: Commandant of the New South Wales Native Police Force (1848–1854)

Frederick Walker (14 April 1820 – 19 November 1866) was a British public servant of the Colony of New South Wales, property manager, Commandant of the Native Police, squatter and explorer, today best known as the first and much feared Commandant of the death squads known as the Native Police Force that operated in the colonies of New South Wales and Queensland. He was appointed commandant of this force by the NSW government in 1848 and was dismissed in 1854. During this time period the Native Police were engaged in what was known as “dispersals” of other indigenous people from their lands and were active from the Murrumbidgee/Murray River areas through the Darling River districts and into what is now the far North Coast of NSW and southern and central Queensland. Despite this large area, most operations under Walker's command occurred on the northern side of the Macintyre River (i.e., Queensland). Detachments of up to 12 troopers worked on the Clarence and Macleay Rivers in NSW until the early 1860s and patrols still extended as far south as Bourke until at least 1868. After his dismissal from the Native Police, Walker became involved in the pastoral industry as a squatter, as well as organising a private native police force and leading a number of expeditions into Northern Queensland.

== Early years ==
Walker was born in Hampshire, England in 1820. His father, John Walker, an officer in the British Army, lived until 1837 and was a landholder at Purbrook Park. His mother, the French-born Maria Teresa Henrietta Swinburne, was a daughter of Henry Swinburne, and granddaughter to Sir John Swinburne 3rd Baronet. Frederick's sister, Harriet Walker, was married to Reginald Yorke, a rear-admiral in the Royal Navy. Two other siblings of Frederick were apparently handicapped. It has been claimed that Robert George Walker, who also became a Native Police officer, achieving the rank of first lieutenant in 1861, was also a brother but it has been argued that this officer was not a relative.

Frederick emigrated to Australia by the Ceylon in 1844 and was shortly after employed on William Charles Wentworth's massive Murrumbidgee River station Tala (also known as Yanga) where he served as superintendent. In the same year, he was made a corporal in the paramilitary Border Police unit based in the Murrumbidgee District. In 1845, Walker was appointed as Clerk of Petty Sessions in Tumut and in April 1847 he attained the same position at Wagga Wagga. On 18 August 1848 he was appointed "Magistrate of the Territories and its Dependencies" and Commandant of newly established Native Police Force on the recommendation of his former employers William Charles Wentworth (1790–1872) and Augustus Morris (1820?–1895), both members of the New South Wales Legislative Council.

== Native Police ==
Walker had attracted attention, it was later stated, by his capacity to engage local Aborigines, understand their culture, speak their language and use this to secure peaceful coexistence between them and the white settlers. He also had previous practical experience in the Murrumbidgee District of using intertribal hostility for the benefit of colonisation. In 1847, Walker was called upon by frontier squatter Edmund Morey to punish the local Tati Tati people for interfering with the formation of his Euston pastoral station on the Murray River. Walker set out with two armed Aboriginals named Robin Hood and Marengo from the neighbouring Edward River tribe. At Lake Benanee, with the aid of other squatters they shot dead a number of Tati Tati in a skirmish that ended the tribe's resistance. Walker appears to have obtained his Aboriginal name of Morum Billak or Muroo Billi while living in the Murray River area. There is conjecture as to the actual meaning of the name but it has been stipulated to mean either Long Legs or Big Nose.

The Native Police Force that Walker was to command was formed in August 1848 in the Deniliquin area on the Edward River and commenced training later that year. Fourteen 15- to 25-year-old Aboriginal troopers were picked from four different Murrumbidgee tribes, by all accounts a well drilled and highly disciplined band greatly committed and attached to their Commandant who remained exceedingly proud and protective of his men. Subsequently, Walker travelled with his force up the Darling River, arriving at the Macintyre River (at the present-day southeastern border of Queensland) on 10 May 1849. Once arriving on the Macintyre River on 10 May 1849, the force aggressively pacified the local aboriginals resulting in "some lives lost". They were then deployed to the Condamine River where the "Fitzroy Downs blacks" were routed and another group were "compelled to fly" from the area.

Walker found most of the squatters and magistrates in the region thought the Native Police were there to shoot down the natives so they wouldn't have to. Walker encouraged the squatters to admit the local aboriginals onto their runs so that they could be easily observed and controlled. This was done and Walker's measure of success was the resulting increase in land values. These first actions of the Native Police reduced to great effect Aboriginal attacks and resistance against squatters in the Macintyre and Condamine regions. Walker was successful in ending the attacks of the Bigambul people in the Macintyre district. His stated aim was their annihilation, and by 1854 only 100 of the Bigambul people were left alive.

Walker expanded the Native Police force during the early 1850s into the Wide Bay-Burnett, Maranoa, Clarence River, Macleay River, Dawson River, Port Curtis and Darling Downs regions. They conducted wide-ranging and frequent operations resulting in many dispersals and summary mass killings. Governor Fitzroy noted in the 1851 end of year report "that a great many blacks were killed," however no official action was taken to change the aggressive functioning of the force.

On 11 October 1854, Walker referred to his report from 2 January 1854, of a collision between the Wide Bay Aboriginal people and the Native Police when the group had resisted the passing of the police at Obi Creek. The cause of the collision had been unknown. Although a wanted Aboriginal man named Durobberee was present, Walker had not thought this sufficient. The Aboriginal people easily escaped. Walker later reported he had discovered that the real reason was to prevent the police from observing a runaway convict named Gilberry. Walker wrote that he had arranged a plan for his capture. It had appeared strange to Walker that none of the patrol parties had ever discovered the tracks of this man as the track of a white man was different from that of an Aborigine. However, this could be explained as some of the women followed Gilburri and covered his tracks.

A large contingent of Native Police troopers were used in an invasion of Fraser Island. Walker with Lieutenant Richard Purvis Marshall and Sergeant Doolan and three divisions of troopers, together with local landholders set out from Maryborough. The force landed on the west coast of the island where the divisions split up to scour the region. Marshall's section shot a number of Badtjala and captured several. Bad weather hampered operations and Commandant Walker subsequently allowed his division to track down other groups of Badtjala without him. This group chased the local Aboriginals across to the east coast where they mustered them into the ocean. When the first overlanding pastoralists entered the Port Curtis area, the 1st Division of Native Police under Commandant Walker was sent into the region to "have a month's sharp shooting."

The size of the Native Police expanded further in 1854 to 10 Divisions and as a consequence their violent methods were becoming increasingly noticeable. Supporters of the force had to defend charges of "wanton cruelty" perpetrated by the force by justifying the need of "cutting a lane to the culprit through the bodies of his defenders". Further official complaints to the government in Sydney of massacres of peaceful "station blacks" by the Native Police were brushed off in parliament by the Attorney-General as unfounded or exaggerated. Embarrassing information like these reports and further complaints from squatters, such as William Forster, who felt they didn't get enough protection from the force, as well as certain financial irregularities, pushed the NSW Government into organising an inquiry into the Native Police. Commandant Walker was suspended from duty in September and the inquiry, to be held in Brisbane, was set for December. The inquiry was closed to the public and the report was kept secret for two years and even then only fragments of information were released. It revealed that Walker arrived at the inquiry completely drunk and surrounded by nine of his black troopers. The troopers were denied entry, and after an attempt to continue with proceedings, the inebriation of Walker forced an adjournment to the inquiry which was later quickly and conveniently abandoned altogether. An attempt by 2nd Lieut. Irving to confront Walker, resulted in the ex-Commandant drawing a sword against him. Eventually, Walker wandered off and was subsequently dismissed from the Native Police. He was later apprehended at Bromelton, charged with the embezzlement of £100 and sent to Sydney.

== Run-hunter and private militia ==
By 1857, Walker was back on the northern frontier of European colonisation in Australia, employed on Serocold and Mackenzie's Cockatoo station. Here he formulated plans with squatter George Serocold to examine land for occupation in the upper reaches of the Comet River. He set out with another squatter named Wiggins and three Aboriginal men, two of whom were Peabody and Jamie Sandeman, to hunt for these pastoral runs. On returning to Cockatoo, Walker's camp was attacked by local Aboriginals at Conciliation Creek in the Zamia Valley. Walker received two severe spear wounds and with difficulty made his recovery at nearby Palm Tree Creek station owned by squatters Scott and Thompson. At this time the Hornet Bank massacre occurred and Andrew Scott requested assistance from the now recovered Walker to assist with the protection of his newly acquired land. Walker recruited ten of his ex-Native Police troopers and formed a private militia that roamed the Dawson River area conducting punitive missions against local Aboriginal groups. Walker used Hornet Bank station as a base and travelled as far as Mount Abundance during his patrols. His troopers included Larry, Boney, Jingle, Billy, Coreen Jemmy and Coreen Neddy. The troopers were actively recruited from the discharged members of the Native Police and were financed by local squatters unhappy with the government run force. George Serocold described the situation as a Border War and even called for the importation of the Cape Mounted Rifles from Africa to give a lesson to "these savages as will enable us to gain our moral ascendency, let them be made to feel the miseries of war". The Queensland Government eventually determined that Walker's private militia was illegal and ordered its dissolution in 1859. William Wiseman, the Commissioner for Crown Lands in the region, was sent to the Dawson River to enact the order. He found that Walker's troops were conveniently already dissolved and working on Andrew Scott's Hornet Bank and Pollet Cardew's Eurombah stations as shepherds earning £35 per annum. Frederick Walker was also employed as overseer and ex-Native Police officer Ross was superintendent.

In September 1859, Walker officially became a pastoral squatter, taking up the Meteor Creek, Clematis, Carnarvon Creek and Consuelo runs in conjunction with established squatters Serocold, Wiggins and Mackenzie. He expanded his property interests in 1860 by establishing the Planet Downs station on the Comet River with Daniel Cameron, and helped Rolleston and the Dutton brothers take up their runs nearby. Walker continued his method of pacification of local Aboriginals by allowing those who submitted to European colonisation to remain on their land as indentured labour. This strategy went against official Queensland Government policy at the time which encouraged the forcible removal or elimination of Aboriginals from desirable frontier grazing lands. As a result, Walker and the other squatters who associated with him made frequent official complaints against the actions of magistrates and Native Police in the area. Walker wrote letters to the Attorney-General complaining of the actions of Lieutenant Patrick of the Native Police killing peaceable Aboriginals on his run. He also described how magistrates in the area viewed the "native blacks" as aliens in their own land, legally voiding them of any rights and refusing to prosecute white people who had murdered them. Walker also wrote about the Juandah massacre, where many innocent Aboriginals were shot and killed by vigilantes in the Juandah courthouse.

Around this time, Walker was also commissioned by a Sydney pastoral company to locate a suitably large area of land to graze 100,000 head of sheep. Walker located this area on the Barcoo River and as a result of this expedition became one of the first British people to enter this region.

== 1861 Burke and Wills recovery expedition ==
In 1861 Walker led a party, ostensibly in search of the ill-fated Burke and Wills expedition, but his focus was more upon hunting for new pastoral runs. His meticulous journal of the search is often transcribed from the abridged version published by the Royal Geographical Society, but the full version is found in the correspondence of the Gulf of Carpentaria exploration expedition of Commander Norman. On 25 August 1861, Walker set out from Rockhampton accompanied by ex-Native Police troopers Jingle, Rodney, Patrick, Coreen Jemmy and Jemmy Cargara. These aboriginal men had served Walker for many years and were vital in ascertaining the terrain and communicating with the local indigenous people. Walker acknowledged their importance by naming mountains and rivers after them. However, this mutual respect was not extended to some aboriginal groups met with along the way. On 30 October near the Stawell River, the party met with a group of locals who they deemed hostile. Walker writes that 'It was now for us to be doing...Now was shown the benefit of Terry's breech loaders, for such a continued steady fire was kept up.' Out of around 30 aboriginals armed with spears, 12 were killed and 'few if any escaped unwounded.' On 1 December near the Leichardt River, Walker's party charged another group of aboriginals resulting in 'a heavy loss.' Despite the obvious advantages in weaponry, Walker managed to find himself in a dangerous situation on 4 December. Walker and Jingle, being separated from the others and with only limited ammunition and one horse, were being surrounded and had to flee in panic for eighteen miles before considering themselves safe. Three days later, the group, having reformed, achieved the rendezvous point with Captain Norman. They had failed to locate Burke and Wills and their party.

== 1866 Electric Telegraph survey and death ==
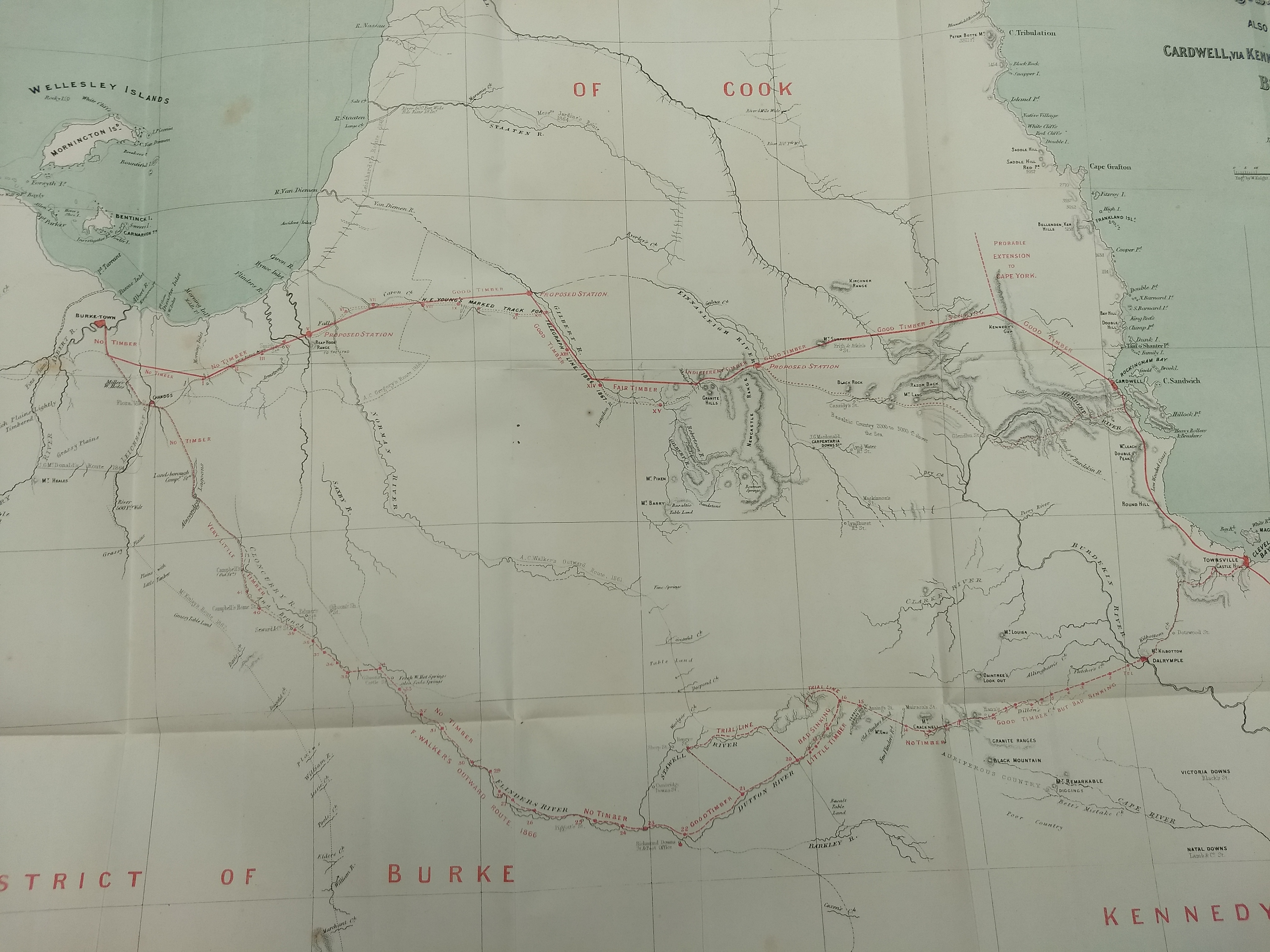
Frederick Walker's route (dotted red line) for the proposed electric telegraph in 1866

In 1866, Walker was employed by the Superintendent of Electric Telegraph to survey a 500-mile route from Bowen to Burketown in a bid to compete against South Australia for the end of the Trans-Oceanic link from Europe. Although the South Australian project won the race and Darwin became the terminus, Walker did manage to lead an expedition to survey a route for the Burketown line. His expedition consisted of himself as leader, H.E.Young, Mr. Perrier, Mr. Ewan, Mr. Merryweather and four Aboriginals who went by the names of Paul, Alfred, Charley and Tommy. On making their way to the starting point of Bowen, Walker had a severe fall from a horse and was subsequently unwell for most of the remainder of his journey. He arrived in Burketown with his party at the height of the Gulf Fever – a typhoid which affected the Gulf after the arrival in Burketown of a vessel on which all the crew except the Captain died. To compound matters, Walker's camp just outside the settlement was described by H.E.Young as the "worst camp that I had ever seen", with no shade and poor water. Walker had chronic diarrhoea while he was at this camp. The party commenced their return journey but at Floraville, Walker became too weak to continue and after several days he died on 19 November 1866. The entry in H.E.Young's journal recorded Walker's passing: "as soon as the horses were brought up and a couple saddled, Perrier and Ewan were starting for the doctor of the Leichhardt search expedition which was camped about six miles off. But he died before they mounted. He died at noon and was buried on the evening of the same day."

The administration of Walker's will was completed in London on 13 April 1867. His entire effects of £1160 14s 11d were left to his sister Harriet Yorke.

== Legacy ==
Frederick Walker's grave is located near the bank of the Leichardt River on Floraville Station, 71 kilometres (44 mi) south-southeast of Burketown in far north Queensland. The grave was discovered in 1979 by Floraville grazier Walter Camp, who also erected a small monument to Walker nearby. The inscription on the grave reads:

On August 17 1848 Frederick Walker, aged 28, was appointed to the position of Commandant of the Corps of Native Police having emigrated from Australia from England. The Corps commenced with fourteen troopers recruited from four different New South Wales tribes. In 1850 Walker had three units and two lieutenants in the corps and by 1852 he increased the Corps with 48 additional Aboriginal troopers who were drilled and trained in the use of carbines, swords, saddles and bridles. On 12 October 1854 Walker was dismissed from the service for impropriety of conduct due to his heavy drinking. After his dismissal he continued to live on the frontier and briefly formed an illegal force of ten ex-troopers from the Native Police Corps to protect settlers in the Upper Dawson region. In August 1861 fears had grown for the safety of the Burke and Wills expedition and Walker was sent at the insistence of the Royal Society of Victoria to search for the ill-fated expedition. Frederick Walker was in many ways a remarkable man. His exploration of the Gulf assisted in opening up the region and his maps were considered accurate. Walker did not find Burke and Wills but he did find Camp 119, the last Burke and Wills camp before they turned south on their return journey. After lengthy explorations of the Gulf region Walker was then employed by the Superintendent of Electric Telegraph to survey a 500 mile route from Bowen to Burketown in a bid to compete against South Australia to have Burketown the end of the Trans-Oceanic link from Europe. Although Frederick Walker lost the race and Darwin became the terminus, he did survey the line. He arrived in Burketown with his party of four Europeans and four Aboriginal assistants at the height of the Gulf Fever - a typhoid which affected the Gulf after the arrival in Burketown of a vessel on which all the crew except the Captain died. Walker commenced his return journey but at Floraville he became ill and after several days he also died of the Gulf Fever on 19 September 1866. The entry in the expedition's logbook recorded the passing of a pioneer of the gulf: 'as soon as the horses were brought up and a couple saddled Perrier and Ewan were starting for the doctor of the Leichhardt search expedition which was camped about six miles off. But he (Walker) died before they mounted. He died at noon and was buried on the evening of the same day. So ended the life of a remarkable Australian.'

There are two memorial plaques to Frederick Walker in Hughenden commemorating his actions in attempting to find the Burke and Wills expedition party.

Walkers Creek, located near Marathon Station in far north Queensland is named after Frederick Walker.

The original letter from Frederick Walker to the Colonial Secretary regarding an attack of the Native Police on "Friendly Blacks" at a station in Central Queensland, killing and wounding several of them. was ranked No. 45 in the ‘Top 150: Documenting Queensland’ exhibition when it toured to venues around Queensland from February 2009 to April 2010. The exhibition was part of Queensland State Archives’ events and exhibition program which contributed to the state's Q150 celebrations, marking the 150th anniversary of the separation of Queensland from New South Wales.
