= Cambroon, Queensland =

Cambroon
- Suburb
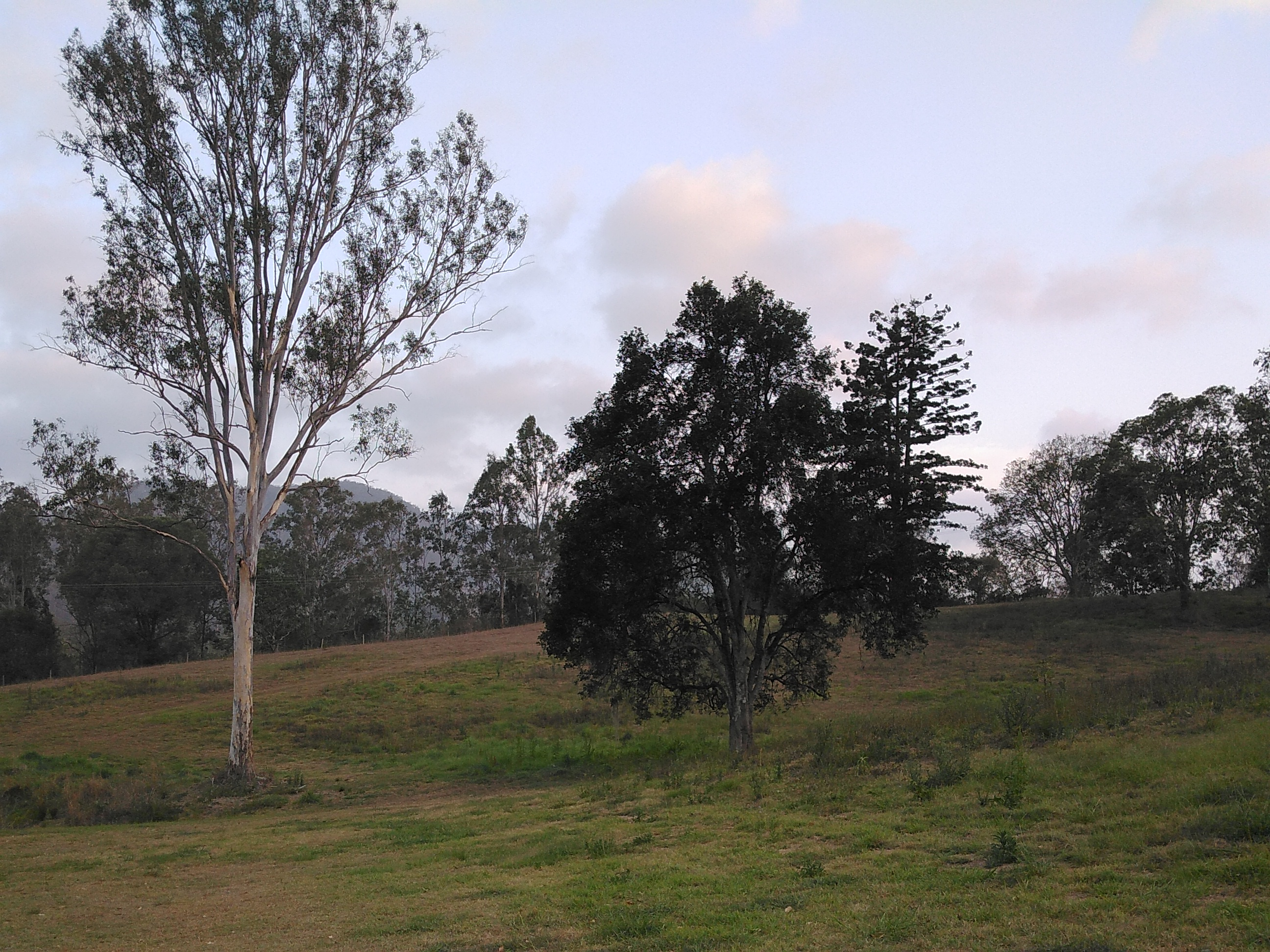
- Cambroon, 2019

- Interactive map of Cambroon
- Coordinates: 26.6494°S 152.6741°E
- Country: Australia
- State: Queensland
- LGA: Sunshine Coast Region
- Location: 28.6 km (17.8 mi) S of Imbil; 31.8 km (19.8 mi) NW of Maleny; 41.2 km (25.6 mi) W of Nambour; 65.3 km (40.6 mi) NW of Caloundra; 133 km (83 mi) N of Brisbane

Government
  - State electorate: Glass House
  - Federal division: Fisher

Area
  - Total: 37.5 km^{2} (14.5 sq mi)

Population
  - Total: 211 (2021 census)
  - Density: 5.627/km^{2} (14.57/sq mi)
- Time zone: UTC+10:00 (AEST)
- Postcode: 4552
Suburbs around Cambroon
Kenilworth	Kenilworth	Kenilworth
Kenilworth	Cambroon	Curramore
Kenilworth	Conondale	Conondale

Cambroon is a rural locality in the Sunshine Coast Region, Queensland, Australia. In the 2021 census, Cambroon had a population of 211 people.

== Geography ==
Cambroon is located on the Mary River. It is on the Maleny-Kenilworth Road.

== History ==
Cambroon takes its name from the pastoral run of the same name, which was established in 1855 by J. D. MacTaggart. The name of the pastoral run is believed to be the name of an Aboriginal leader at the time of first contact.

In 1887, 16,000 acres (6,500 ha) of land were resumed from the Cambroon pastoral run for the establishment of small farms. The land was offered for selection on 17 April 1887.

Residents began to lobby for a school in 1919. Cambroon Provisional School opened on 5 February 1923 and became Cambroon State School on 1 December 1924. The school closed in May 1944. It was on a 5-acre (2.0 ha) site at 1038 Eastern Mary River Road (26.64263°S 152.68739°E). In 1949, tenders were called to remove the school building and re-erect it at Wamuran State School.

== Demographics ==
In the 2011 census, Cambroon had a population of 373 people. Almost all the people living in Cambroon speak English.

In the 2016 census, Cambroon had a population of 219 people.

In the 2021 census, Cambroon had a population of 211 people.

== Education ==
There are no schools in Cambroon. The nearest government primary schools are Kenilworth State Community College in neighbouring Kenilworth to the north-east and Conondale State School in neighbouring Conodale to the south-east. The nearest government secondary schools are Mary Valley State College (to Year 10) in Imbil to the north and Maleny State High School (to Year 12) in Maleny to the south-east.
