= Brooloo, Queensland =

Brooloo
- Town
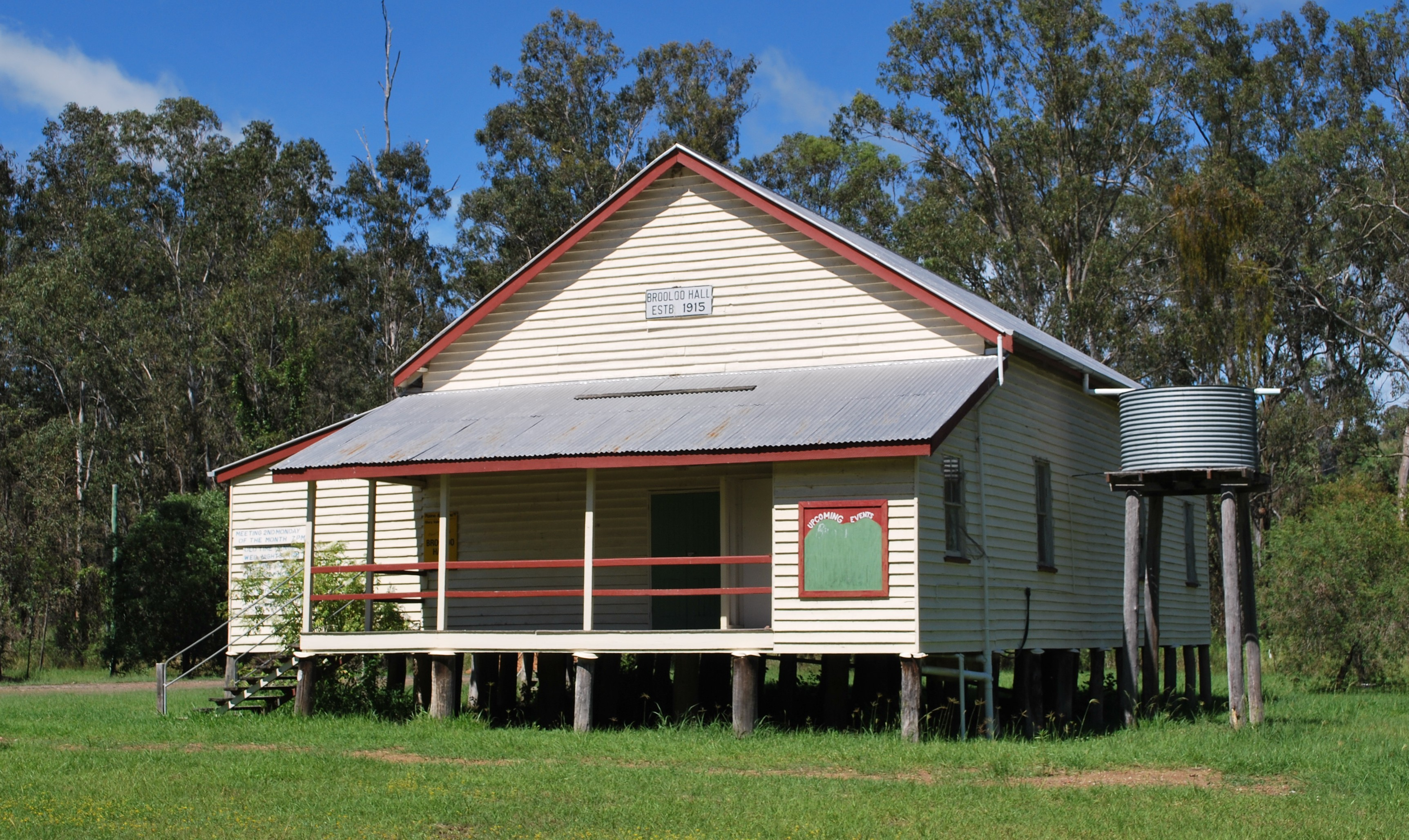
- Brooloo Public Hall, established 1915

- Interactive map of Brooloo
- Coordinates: 26.4872°S 152.7008°E
- Country: Australia
- State: Queensland
- LGA: Gympie Region
- Location: 4.8 km (3.0 mi) SSE of Imbil; 15.1 km (9.4 mi) N of Kenilworth; 40.9 km (25.4 mi) S of Gympie; 169 km (105 mi) N of Brisbane

Government
  - State electorate: Gympie
  - Federal division: Wide Bay

Area
  - Total: 27.8 km^{2} (10.7 sq mi)

Population
  - Total: 369 (2021 census)
  - Density: 13.27/km^{2} (34.38/sq mi)
- Time zone: UTC+10:00 (AEST)
- Postcode: 4570
Localities around Brooloo
Imbil	Bollier	Bollier
Imbil	Brooloo	Moy Pocket
Imbil	Kenilworth	Kenilworth

Brooloo is a rural town and locality in the Gympie Region, Queensland, Australia. In the 2021 census, the locality of Brooloo had a population of 369 people.

== Geography ==
The town is located in the hinterland behind the Sunshine Coast, 160 kilometres (99 mi) north of the state capital, Brisbane.

Mary Valley Road enters the locality from the north-west (Imbil), passes through the town (in the north of the locality), and then exits to the south-east Kenilworth.

Brooloo railway station is an abandoned railway station on the now-closed Mary Valley railway line (26.4873°S 152.6998°E).

== History ==
The Bluff Provisional School opened in July 1907 under head teacher Samuel B. Bridges. On 1 January 1909, it became The Bluff State School. In May 1915, it was renamed Brooloo State School. It closed in 1970. It was on the western side of the junction of Mary Valley Road and Moy Pocket Road (26.4918°S 152.7053°E).

Brooloo Hall opened in 1915.

Brooloo Post Office opened by June 1915 (a receiving office had been open from March 1914). In 1922, the Brooloo Rail office was renamed Brooloo and replaced the previous office. It closed in 1972.

== Demographics ==
In the 2006 census, the locality of Brooloo and the surrounding area had a population of 333.

In the 2016 census, the locality of Brooloo had a population of 348 people.

In the 2021 census, the locality of Brooloo had a population of 369 people.

== Heritage listings ==
Booloo has one heritage-listed site. It is Brooloo Hall at 3726 Mary Valley Road (26.48566°S 152.70356°E).

== Education ==
There are no schools in Brooloo. The nearest government primary schools are Mary Valley State College in neighbouring Imbil to the north-west and Kenilworth State Community College in neighbouring Kenilworth to the south. The nearest government secondary schools are Mary Valley State College (to Year 10) in Imbil and Gympie State High School (to Year 12) in Gympie to the north.
