= Bollier, Queensland =

Bollier
- Suburb
- Interactive map of Bollier
- Coordinates: 26.4583°S 152.7305°E
- Country: Australia
- State: Queensland
- LGA: Gympie Region
- Location: 6.4 km (4.0 mi) E of Imbil; 36.2 km (22.5 mi) S of Gympie; 154 km (96 mi) N of Brisbane

Government
  - State electorate: Gympie
  - Federal division: Wide Bay

Area
  - Total: 32.7 km^{2} (12.6 sq mi)

Population
  - Total: 221 (2021 census)
  - Density: 6.758/km^{2} (17.50/sq mi)
- Time zone: UTC+10:00 (AEST)
- Postcode: 4570
Suburbs around Bollier
Imbil	Kandanga	Tuchekoi
Imbil	Bollier	Carters Ridge
Brooloo	Moy Pocket	Belli Park

Bollier is a rural locality in the Gympie Region, Queensland, Australia. In the 2021 census, Bollier had a population of 221 people.

== History ==
The locality takes its name either from the Aboriginal word for a vine in the area used for climbing trees, or from Bo-aldha in the Aboriginal language means "place of the little wallaby that runs in a circle".

Runaway Irish convict John "Gilburri" Fahy made a reference to "Bulduer" when he was captured in 1854. Fahy lived with the Aboriginal people for thirteen years, occupying the country lying between Wide Bay and Port Curtis, called by the Aboriginal people, as Fahy says "Bulduer"

The name "Bollier Flats" is shown on a 1865 survey map of the Yabba and Bunya Creeks.

Bollier Provisional School opened on 22 January 1894 with 14 students. The initial school building was 20 by 12 feet (6.1 by 3.7 m). It was located on a 10-acre (4.0 ha) at 287 Tuckeroi Road on the corner of Lowe Road (26.4353°S 152.7340°E). In 1907 a new school building was built with the old school building demolished and sold as timber. On 1 January 1909 it became Bollier State School. In 1929 it closed due to low student numbers, but reopened and then closed again in 1930. On 8 February 1934 it reopened as Bollier State School and finally closed in 1946. The students from Bollier were then taken by bus each day to the Imbil State School (now the Mary Valley State College). In 1949 the school building was relocated to Amamoor State School.

Bollier School of Arts was established circa 1900. It was located at the southern end of Chippendall Road.

== Demographics ==
In the 2016 census Bollier had a population of 200 people.

In the 2021 census, Bollier had a population of 221 people.

== Education ==
There are no schools in Bollier. The nearest government primary schools are Mary Valley State College in neighbouring Imbil to the west and Kandanga State School in neighbouring Kandanga to the north-west. The nearest government secondary schools are Mary Valley State State College (to Year 10) in neighbouring Imbil to the west and Gympie State High School (to Year 12) in Gympie to the north.
