= Gheerulla =

- Suburb
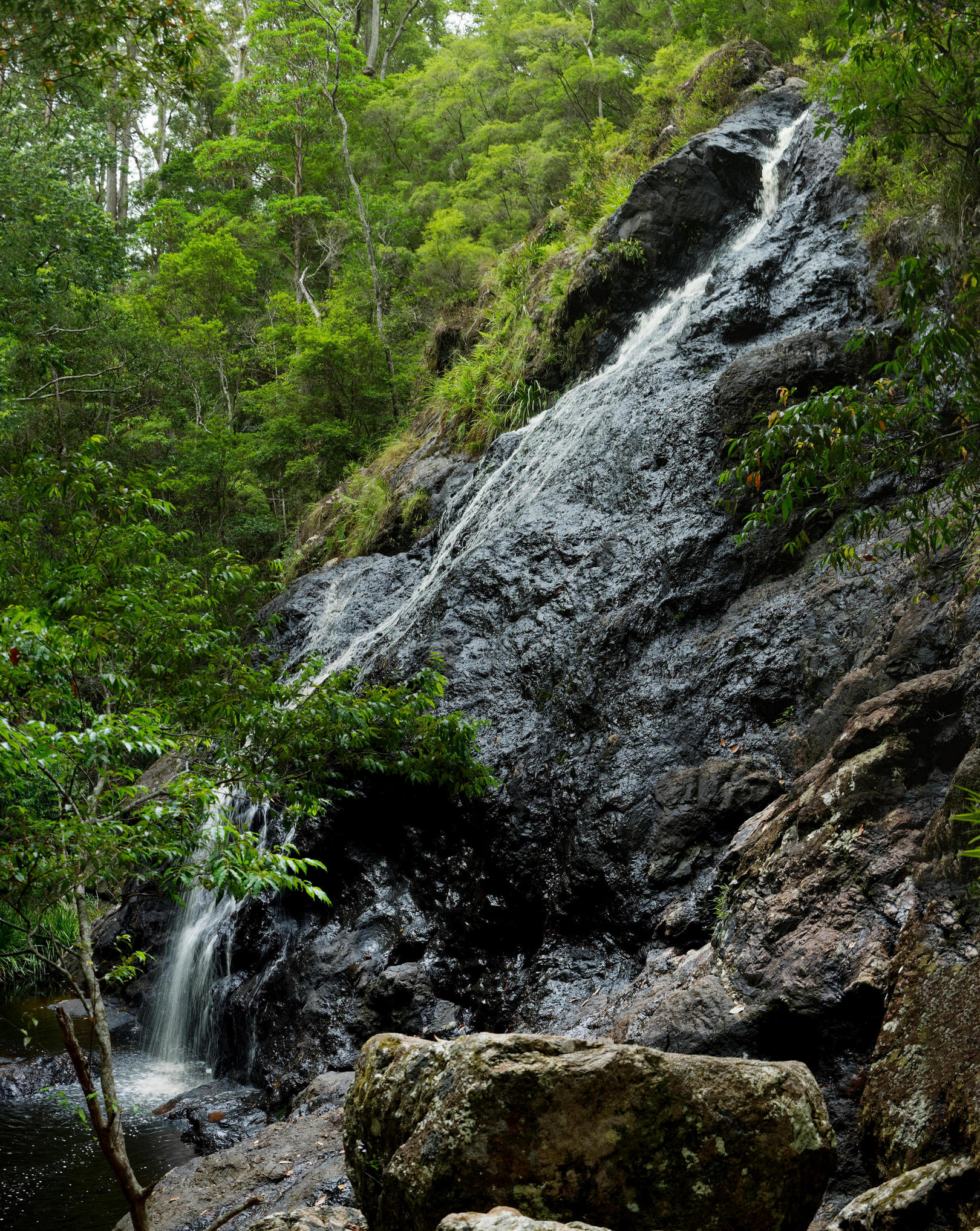
- Gheerulla Falls, 2020

- Interactive map of Gheerulla
- Coordinates: 26.5763°S 152.8147°E
- Country: Australia
- State: Queensland
- LGA: Sunshine Coast Region
- Location: 24.0 km (14.9 mi) SW of Eumundi; 42.8 km (26.6 mi) NW of Nambour; 69.0 km (42.9 mi) NW of Caloundra; 150 km (93 mi) N of Brisbane

Government
  - State electorate: Nicklin
  - Federal division: Fairfax

Area
  - Total: 89.9 km^{2} (34.7 sq mi)

Population
  - Total: 291 (2021 census)
  - Density: 3.237/km^{2} (8.384/sq mi)
- Time zone: UTC+10:00 (AEST)
- Postcode: 4574
Suburbs around Gheerulla
Moy Pocket	Belli Park	Cooloolabin
Kenilworth	Gheerulla	Kiamba
Coolabine	Obi Obi; Mapleton	Kureelpa

Gheerulla is a rural locality in the Sunshine Coast Region, Queensland, Australia. In the 2021 census, Gheerulla had a population of 291 people.

== Geography ==
Much of the locality is within the Mapleton National Park, which extends into neighbouring Belli Park, Cooloolabin, and beyond. The Blackall Range (26.6070°S 152.8728°E) runs through the east and north-east of the locality within the national park.

Gheerulla has the following mountains and cliffs:

- Mount Thilba Thalba (26.5793°S 152.7860°E) 464 metres (1,522 ft)
- Gheerulla Bluff (26.5769°S 152.7847°E)
- Rocky Bluff (26.5508°S 152.8072°E)

Apart from the national park, the land use in the locality is predominantly grazing on native vegetation and some rural residential housing.

== History ==
Gheerulla is an Aboriginal word meaning empty creek.

The Blackall Range was named in 1868 by Edward Parker Bedwell, a hydrographic surveyor in the Royal Navy, after the Governor of Queensland Samuel Wensley Blackall.

Kenilworth Provisional School was built by the community and opened on 22 January 1900. On 1 January 1909, it became Kenilworth State School. On 19 September 1928, it was renamed Kenilworth Lower State School. It closed on 3 July 1959. This school was on the western side of Eumundi Kenilworth Road (approx 26.5621°S 152.7673°E), now within Gheerulla.

St Matthew's Anglican Church was dedicated on 28 June 1926 by Archbishop Gerald Sharp. 200 people attended the opening. Its closure was approved by Bishop Jonathan Holland with a final service on Sunday 17 May 2015. The church was at 2210 Eumundi Kenilworth Road (26.5563°S 152.7729°E) on a 0.4-hectare (0.99-acre) site. It was sold on 14 March 2016 for $210,000.

== Demographics ==
In the 2016 census, Gheerulla had a population of 214 people.

In the 2021 census, Gheerulla had a population of 291 people.

== Education ==
There are no schools in Gheerulla. The nearest government primary schools are Kenilworth State College in neighbouring Kenilworth to the west and Mapleton State School in neighbouring Mapelton to the south. The nearest government secondary schools are Mary Valley State College (to Year 10) in Imbil to the north-west and Noosa District State High School (to Year 120 which has its junior campus in Pomona to the north and its senior campus in Cooroy to the north-east.

== Attractions ==
There are a number of lookouts in Gheerulla:

- Gheerulla Valley Viewpoint (26.5958°S 152.8127°E)
- Oaky Creek Lookout (26.5555°S 152.8002°E), its name is presumed to refer to nearby Oaky Creek
- Thilba Thalba Viewpoint (26.5794°S 152.7891°E), it was suggested by the Sunshine Coast Environment Council as part of the Great Walk Project believed to have been found on an old map and probably of Aboriginal origin
- Ubajee Viewpoint (26.6063°S 152.8319°E), its name (pronounced yu'ba'djee) is an Aboriginal word in the Gubbi Gubbi and Butchulla languages meaning home

Although in Gheerula, Gheerulla Falls are accessed from Delicia Road in Mapleton via a walking track (26.60806°S 152.82944°E).

The rugged Sunshine Coast Hinterland Great Walk takes at least four days to complete. It leaves from Baroon Pocket Dam and traverses 58.8 kilometres (36.5 mi) through the Blackall Range. Sections 2, 3 and 4 of the Great Walk pass through this area.

== See also ==
- List of long-distance hiking tracks in Australia
