= Kenilworth, Queensland =

Kenilworth
- Town
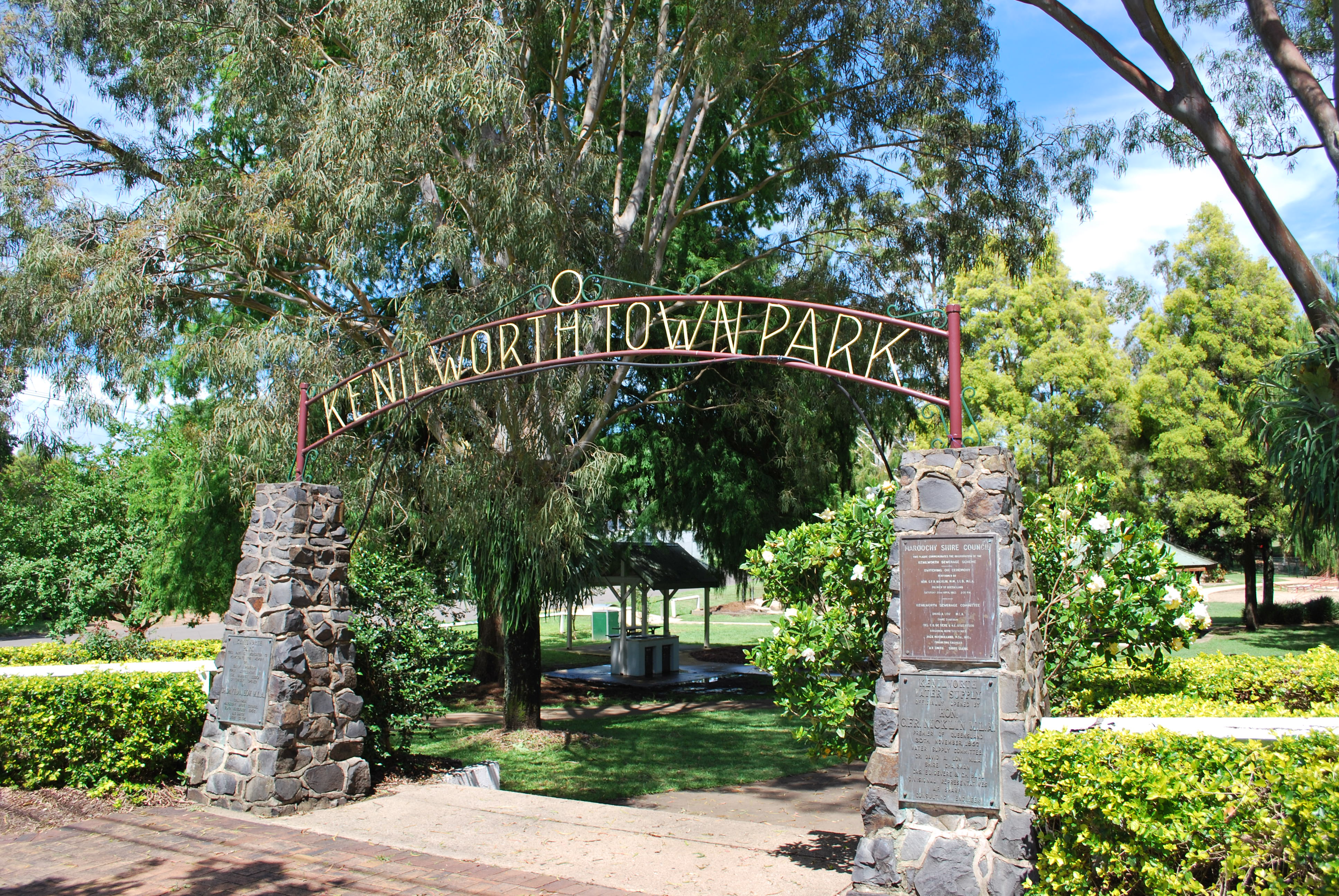
- Kenilworth Town Park

- Interactive map of Kenilworth
- Coordinates: 26.595°S 152.7275°E
- Country: Australia
- State: Queensland
- City: Sunshine Coast
- LGA: Sunshine Coast Region
- Location: 20.2 km (12.6 mi) S of Imbil; 32.8 km (20.4 mi) W of Nambour; 40.1 km (24.9 mi) NW of Maleny; 149 km (93 mi) N of Brisbane CBD

Government
  - State electorates: Nicklin; Glass House
  - Federal divisions: Fairfax; Fisher

Area
  - Total: 188.5 km^{2} (72.8 sq mi)

Population
  - Total: 604 (2021 census)
  - Density: 3.204/km^{2} (8.299/sq mi)
- Time zone: UTC+10:00 (AEST)
- Postcode: 4574
Localities around Kenilworth
Lake Borumba	Imbil Brooloo	Moy Pocket
Jimna	Kenilworth	Gheerulla Coolabine
Jimna	Conondale Cambroon	Kidaman Creek Curramore

Kenilworth is a rural town and locality in the Sunshine Coast Region, Queensland, Australia. In the 2021 census, the locality of Kenilworth had a population of 604 people.

== Geography ==
Kenilworth is in the heart of the Mary Valley area of the Sunshine Coast. It is a rural area, about 50 kilometres (31 mi) from the coast, with dairy farming as the major industry.

The western part of the locality is within the Conondale National Park while the northern part of the locality is within Imbil State Forest. In the south-west is the Walli State Forest.

Maleny–Kenilworth Road enters from the south-west, and Obi Obi Road enters from the south-east.

== History ==
Dalla (also known as Dalambara and Dallambara) is a language of the Upper Brisbane River catchment, notably the Conondale Range. Dalla is part of the Duungidjawu language region includes the landscape within the local government boundaries of the Somerset Region and Moreton Bay Region, particularly the towns of Caboolture, Kilcoy, Woodford and Moore.

The Mary River was known to the Aboriginals as the Numabulla and the name for the Kenilworth area being Hinka Booma. In 1842, Andrew Petrie named the river as the Wide Bay River. In 1847, that Governor Fitzroy renamed the river after his wife Mary.

Richard Joseph Smith tendered to set up the first cattle run on the east bank of the Mary River in 1850. At the time Mrs Smith was reading Sir Walter Scott's novel Kenilworth and she decided to name the property after the novel.

In 1877, 17,280 acres (6,990 ha) of land was resumed from the Kenilworth North pastoral run to be used as small farmers. The land was offered for selection from 17 April 1877.

In October 1921, the Kenilworth Estate of 6,000 acres (2,400 ha) was auctioned having been subdivided into town lots, dairy blocks and grazing blocks. Up to £30 was paid for a town lot while the dairy blocks fetched up to £18 per acre and grazing blocks up to £7 per acre, realising a total of £46,000 from the sale overall.

Other settlers arrived in 1891 originally intending to grow small crops. There was a ready market at the goldfields in Gympie but after the floods of 1893, 1895 and 1898 had wiped out their crops, most ventured into dairying and pig breeding. In 1901, the Kenilworth Farmers' Association was formed and, in 1907, they built the Kenilworth Farmers Assembly Hall. This later housed a library and hosted dances. In 1905, the Association was responsible for establishing a co-operative butter factory which opened in Caboolture in 1907.

Kenilworth Post Office opened by 1926 (a receiving office had been open from 1896).

The first store was opened in Kenilworth on 2 January 1924 as well as the new hall opening and the first butcher's shop appeared in 1925.

Kenilworth Provisional School was built by the community and opened on 22 January 1900. On 1 January 1909, it became Kenilworth State School. On 19 September 1928, it was renamed Kenilworth Lower State School. It closed on 3 July 1959. This school was on the western side of Eumundi Kenilworth Road (approx 26.5621°S 152.7673°E), now within Gheerulla.

Kenilworth Township Provisional School opened 21 October 1924. On 1 October 1926, it became Kenilworth Township State School. On 15 May 1939, it was renamed Kenilworth State School. On 6 March 2003, it became Kenilworth State Community College. On 31 December 2008, the school ceased to provide secondary schooling (previously up to Year 10).

Kenilworth Hall opened in the Kenilworth Township on 21 October 1924. In 1926, the hall was equipped to show silent movies. The site for a public recreation ground was purchased in 1927 and, in 1933, the hall was moved to this new location.

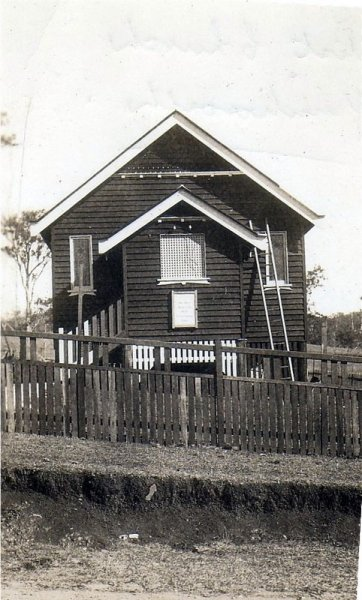
Kenilworth Baptist Church, 1937

Kenilworth Baptist Church was built from timber in 1937. It was officially opened on Sunday 1 August 1937. It is no longer operating and the church building is no longer extant. It was at 31 Elizabeth Street (26.59398°S 152.72744°E).

St John Bosco Roman Catholic Church was built from timber in 1938. It was opened by Archbishop James Duhig on Sunday 10 April 1938 on a piece of land donated by Mr C. Sharry on the top of a hill overlooking the town. It was dedicated to Saint John Bosco.

The Kenilworth Cheese Factory was originally opened in 1952 by the Kraft Foods Inc. It was purchased from the Kraft Corporation in 1990 by a group of former employees. Today it has retitled its name to Kenilworth Dairies.

St Luke's Anglican Church was built from timber in 1954. The foundation stone was laid on Saturday 19 June 1954. It opened in 1955.

The Kenilworth Library opened in 1986 with a major refurbishment in 2000.

== Demographics ==
In the 2006 census, the town of Kenilworth had a population of 238 people.

In the 2011 census, the locality of Kenilworth had a population of 559 people.

In the 2016 census, the locality of Kenilworth had a population of 558 people.

In the 2021 census, the locality of Kenilworth had a population of 604 people.

== Heritage listings ==
Kenilworth has a number of heritage-listed sites, including:

- Kenilworth Homestead, Eumundi-Kenilworth Road

== Education ==
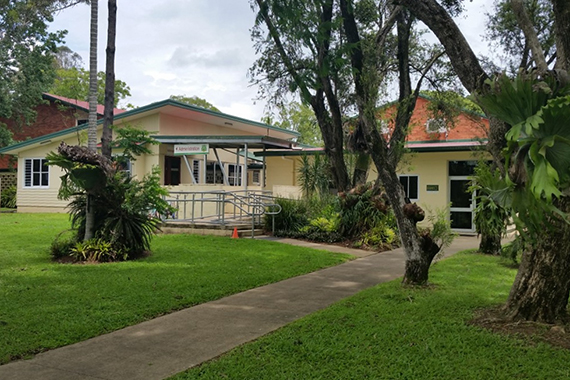
Kenilworth State Community College

Kenilworth State Community College is a government primary (Prep-6) school for boys and girls at 3717 Maleny-Kenilworth Road (26.5991°S 152.7257°E). In 2018, the school had an enrolment of 59 students with 9 teachers (5 full-time equivalent) and 9 non-teaching staff (5 full-time equivalent). It includes a special education program.

There are no secondary schools in Kenilworth. The nearest government secondary schools are Mary Valley State College (to Year 10) in neighbouring Imbil to the north and Maleny State High School (to Year 12) in Maleny to the south-east.

== Amenities ==
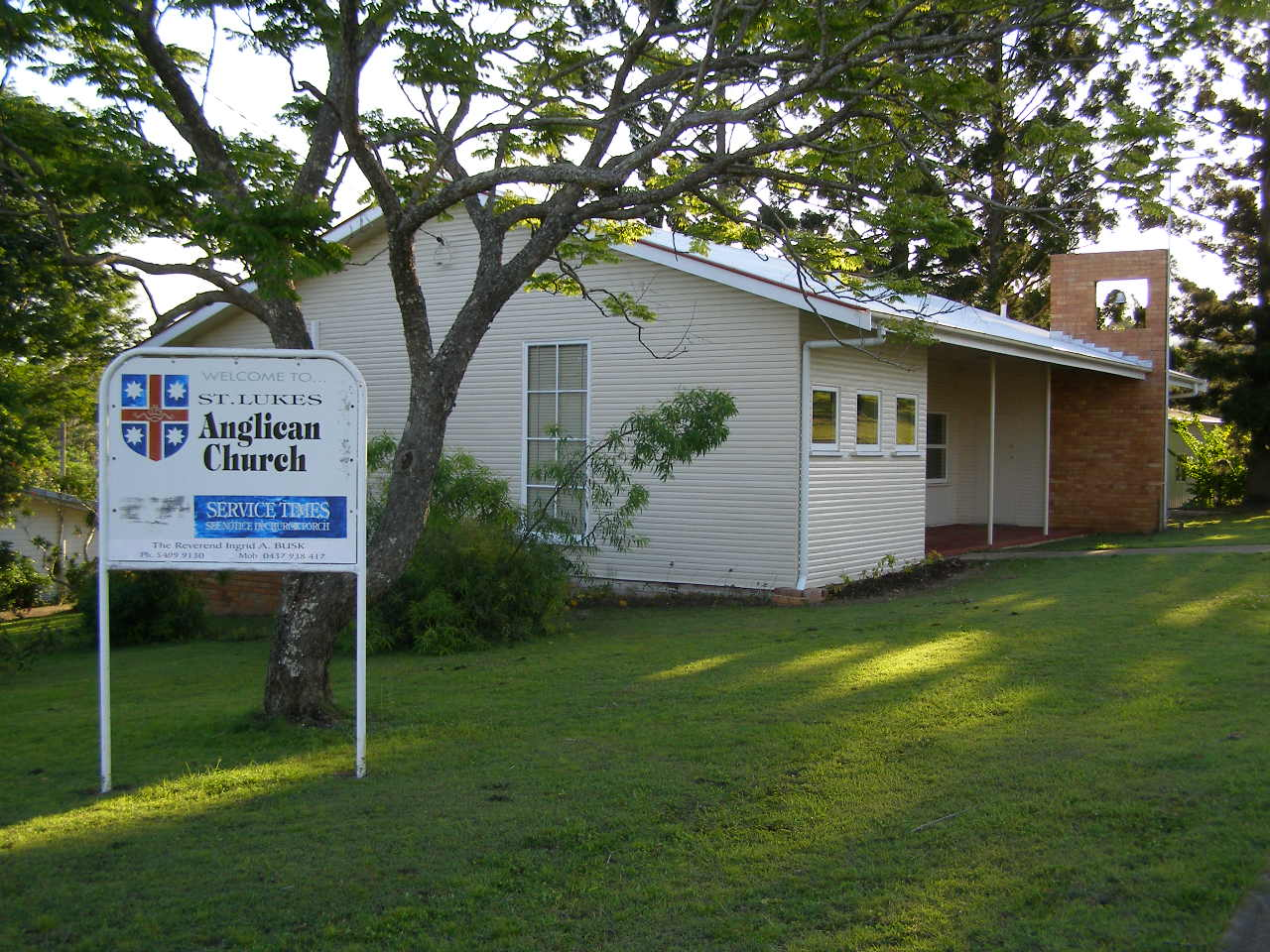
St Luke's Anglican Church, 2006

The Sunshine Coast Regional Council operates a public library at 4A Elizabeth Street.

St Luke's Anglican Church is at 17 Anne Street (26.594905°S 152.726°E).

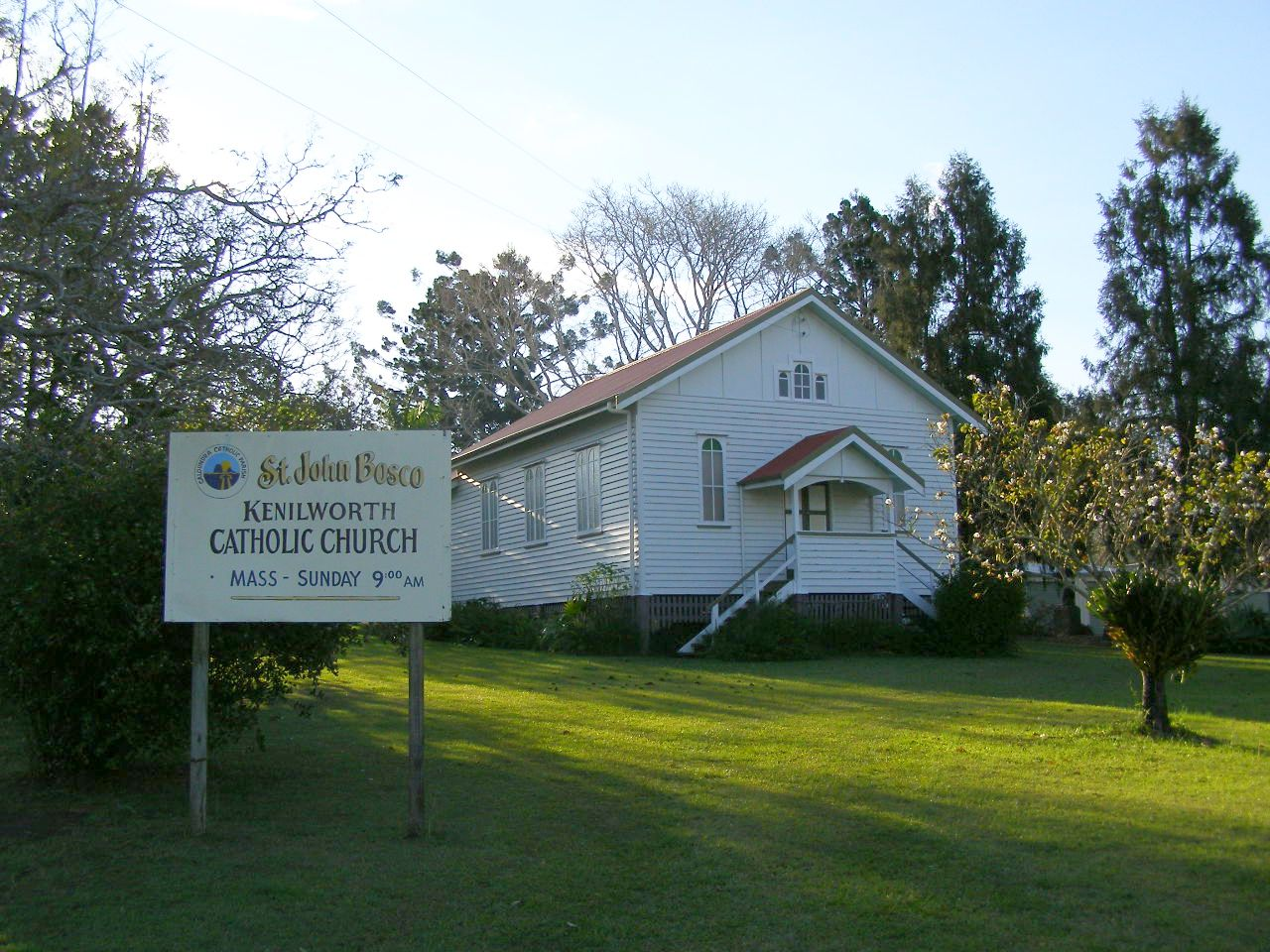
St John Bosco Roman Catholic Church, 2006

St John Bosco Roman Catholic Church is at 21 Anne Street (26.594578°S 152.7263°E).

== Attractions ==
Kenilworth has a 'Living History' Museum with a theatrette which shows a history of the district to visitors, together with displays covering many areas of history past.

Other attractions include a cheese factory as well as walking, camping and 4-wheel driving in the Kenilworth State Forest.
