= Imbil =

- Town
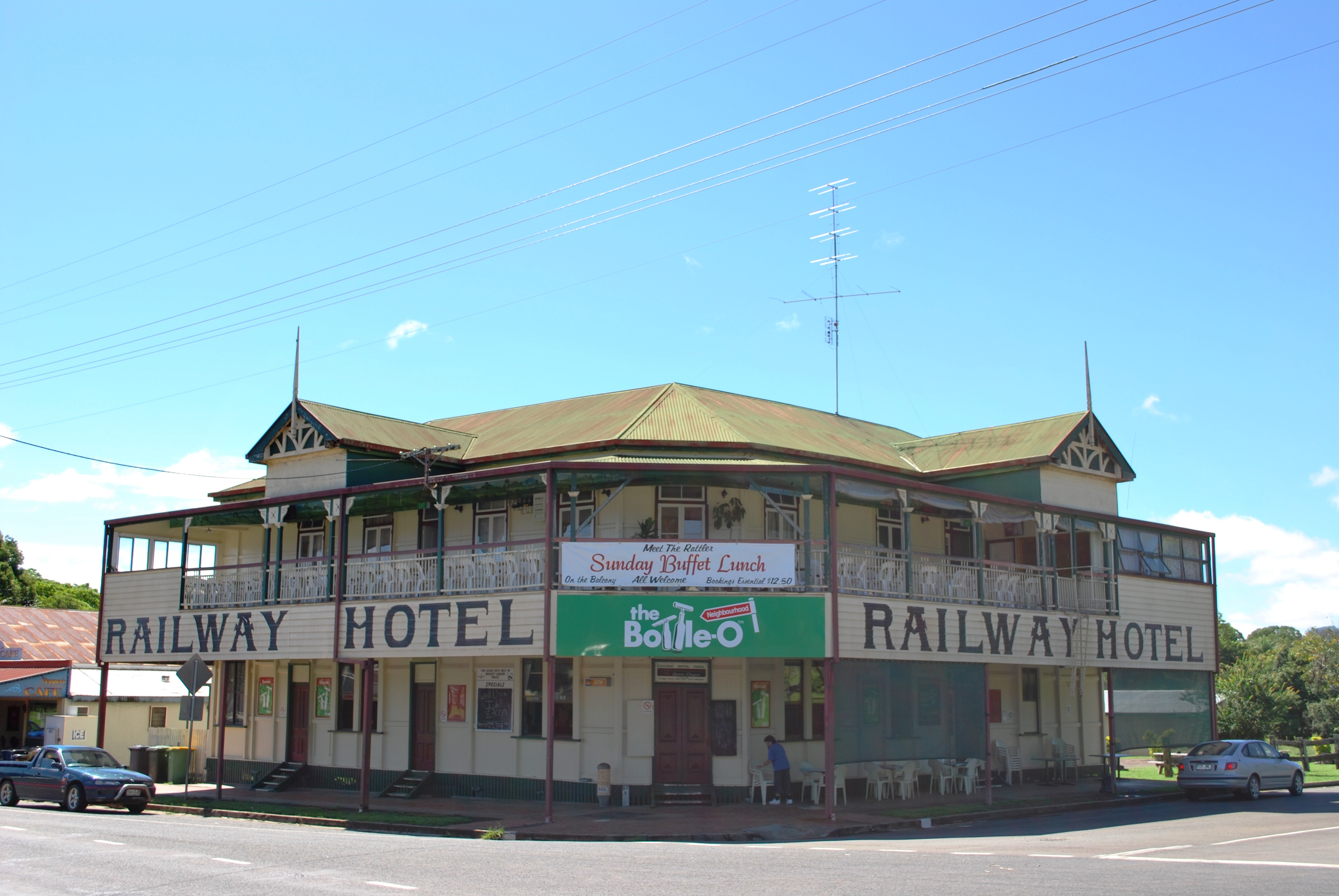
- The historic Railway Hotel

- Interactive map of Imbil
- Coordinates: 26.46°S 152.6775°E
- Country: Australia
- State: Queensland
- LGA: Gympie Region
- Location: 20.1 km (12.5 mi) N of Kenilworth; 35.7 km (22.2 mi) S of Gympie; 169 km (105 mi) N of Brisbane
- Established: 1868

Government
  - State electorate: Gympie
  - Federal division: Wide Bay

Area
  - Total: 196.9 km^{2} (76.0 sq mi)

Population
  - Total: 1,071 (2021 census)
  - Density: 5.439/km^{2} (14.088/sq mi)
- Time zone: UTC+10:00 (AEST)
- Postcode: 4570
Localities around Imbil
Upper Kandanga	Kandanga Creek; Melawondi	Kandanga; Bollier
Bella Creek	Imbil	Brooloo
Lake Borumba	Kenilworth	Kenilworth

Imbil is a rural town and locality in the Gympie Region, Queensland, Australia. In the 2021 census, the locality of Imbil had a population of 1,071 people.

== Geography ==
Imbil is in the Wide Bay–Burnett district in the Mary River valley, 160 kilometres (99 mi) north of the state capital, Brisbane.

== History ==
The town takes its name from the Imbil pastoral run which was named 1857 by the pastoralists Clement Francis Lawless and Paul Lawless. Imbil is a Kabi word referring to the bamboo vine, and is also used to refer to a lagoon below the Imbil station house.

The town was established in 1868 at the start of the gold rush in the area.

In 1887, 21,760 acres (8,810 ha) of land were resumed from the Imbil pastoral run. The land was offered for selection for the establishment of small farms on 17 April 1887.

The first Imbil post office opened on 9 July 1870 and closed in 1872. The second office opened in 1877 and closed in 1907. The third office opened by 1919.

Imbil Provisional School opened on 19 July 1897. Due to fluctuating student numbers, it closed and reopened a number of times before closing in 1911. In 1915 it reopened as Imbil State School. On 30 January 1962 a secondary school section was added. On 30 November 2002 it was renamed Mary Valley State College.

The opening of the Mary Valley branch railway line (now the Mary Valley Rattler) in 1914 brought a second surge of development to the town. Imbil was served by the Imbil railway station at William Street (26.4606°S 152.6761°E).

An Imbil Railway Station Post Office opened in 1917 (a receiving office had been open from 1915) and closed in 1920.

Imbil United Protestant Church was built at 3 Elizabeth Street (26.4607°S 152.6751°E) by the Congregational Church with an official opening on Thursday 15 May 1919 by Reverend Stanley Morrison, the President of the Congregational Union. In 1940 it was sold to the Methodist Church for £125, becoming Imbil Methodist Church.

Christ Church Anglican was dedicated on Wednesday 28 May 1924 by Archbishop Gerald Sharp. Its closure circa 2018 was approved by Bishop Jeremy Greaves. It is located at 88 Yabba Road (26.4602°S 152.6732°E).

On Saturday 13 November 1926 William Lennon, the Queensland Lieutenant-Governor, officially opened the Imbil Memorial School of Arts, which was built by the Imbil sub-branch of the R.S.S.I.L.A. to commemorate those who served and died in World War I.

In 1955 St Columba's Presbyterian Church was opened on the corner of Myers Street and Yabba Road (approx 26.4599°S 152.6738°E). In 1976 in the lead-up to the amalgamation of the Methodist, Presbyterian and Congregational Churches into the Uniting Church in Australia in 1977, the Presbyterian church building was relocated to be adjacent to the Methodist Church building in Elizabeth Street and is now the Imbil Uniting Church, while the former Methodist Church building is now used as the church hall.

The Imbil Public Library building opened in 1987.

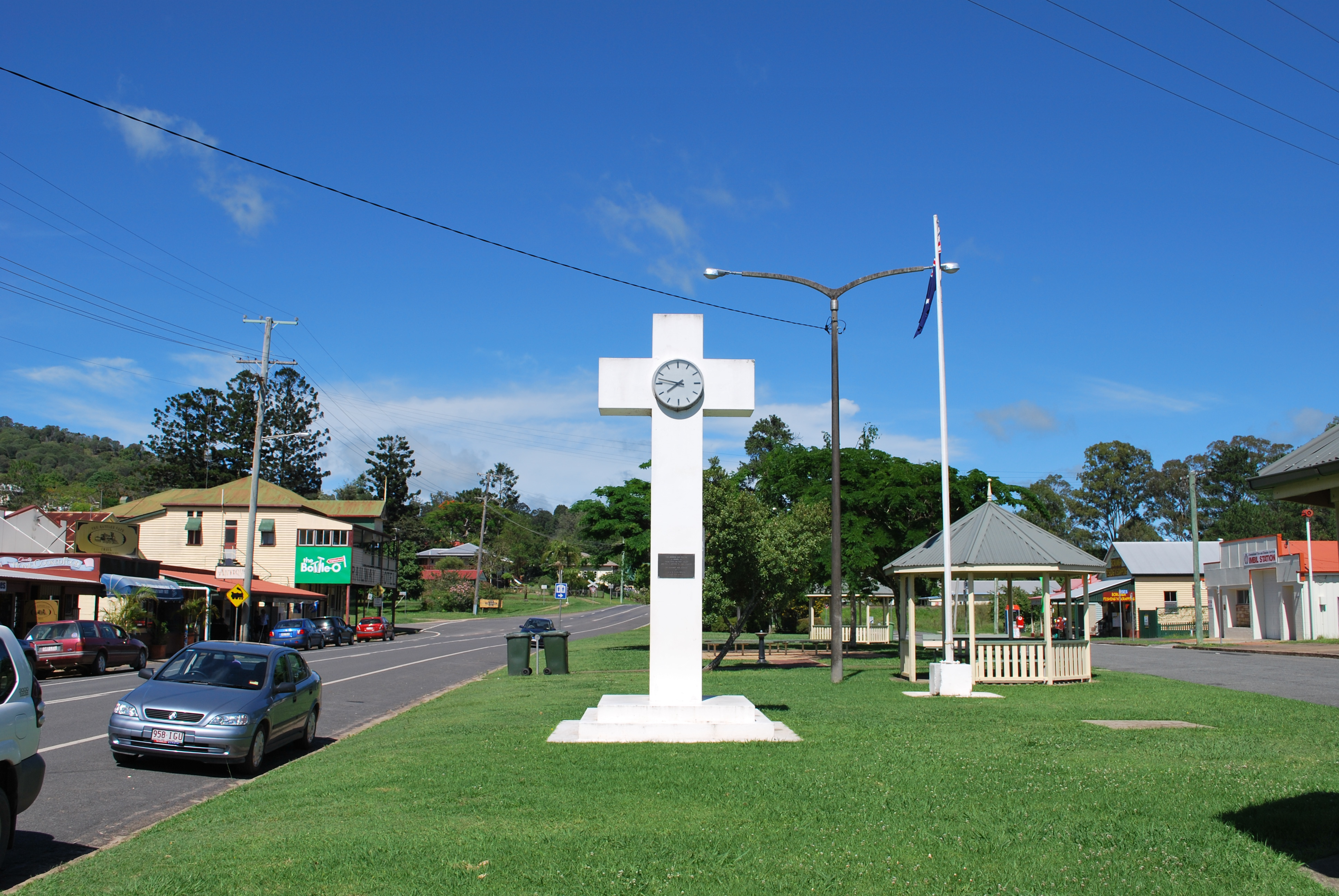
Imbil War Memorial, 2008

The Imbil War Memorial is dedicated to those who served in World War II. It was dedicated on 11 November 1997 by the president of the Mary Valley Returned and Services League of Australia, Clive Colburn.

== Demographics ==
In the 2011 census, the locality of Imbil had a population of 942 people.

In the 2016 census, the locality of Imbil had a population of 924 people.

In the 2021 census, the locality of Imbil had a population of 1,071 people.

== Heritage listings ==
Imbil has a number of heritage-listed sites, including:

- Imbil Railway Bridge, on the Mary Valley Rattler line over Yabba Creek (26.4583°S 152.6756°E)
- Imbil State School, 15 Edward Street
- Imbil Uniting Church, 1 Elizabeth Road
- Imbil railway station, William Street
- Imbil Masonic Hall, 34 Williams Street
- Imbil Police Station, 95 Yabba Road
- Imbil General Store, 100 Yabba Road
- Imbil Hotel, 110 Yabba Road
- former Empire Theatre, 112 Yabba Road
- The Wild Vine Cafe and Restaurant (previously the Empire Bakery), 116 Yabba Road
- Imbil Butcher Shop, 122 Yabba Road
- Imbil RSL Hall, 127 Yabba Road

== Education ==
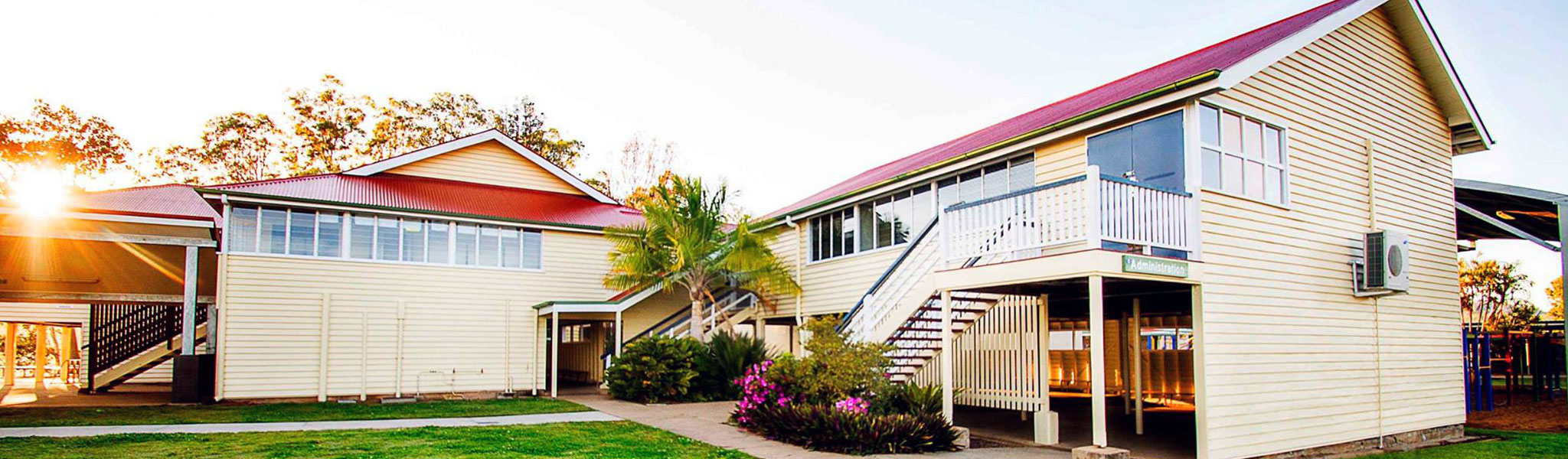
Mary Valley State College, 2023

Mary Valley State College is a government primary and secondary (Prep–10) school for boys and girls at 15 Edward Street (26.4617°S 152.6792°E). In 2017, the school had an enrolment of 155 students with 17 teachers (15 full-time equivalent) and 16 non-teaching staff (9 full-time equivalent). It includes a special education program.

For secondary schooling to Year 12, the nearest government secondary school is Gympie State High School in Gympie to the north.

== Amenities ==
The Gympie Regional Council operates a public library in Imbil at 123–125 Yabba Road (26.4592°S 152.6774°E).

The Imbil branch of the Queensland Country Women's Association meets at the Imbil Public Hall in Edward Street.

Imbil Uniting Church is at 3 Elizabeth Street (26.4609°S 152.6751°E). It is part of the Mary Burnett Presbytery of the Uniting Church in Australia.

Imbil Bowls Club is on Yabba Road.

The town is the home of the Mary Valley Stags Rugby League Club.

== Events ==
Imbil is home to the annual Mary Valley Art Festival. The festival began in 2000. Viewing of entrants artwork is conducted at the Imbil public hall.

The town is also home to the motor rally event, the International Rally of Queensland, a long running event on the Queensland and Australian Rally Championships. It was recently promoted to international standing as a round of the Asia Pacific Rally Championship. Stages are held in surrounding forests and the show grounds are converted into the garage facilities for approximately 70 race cars over the course of the three-day event. It is now the longest running national level rally event in the country.

== See also ==
- Mary Valley Rattler
