= Brisbane General Hospital Precinct =

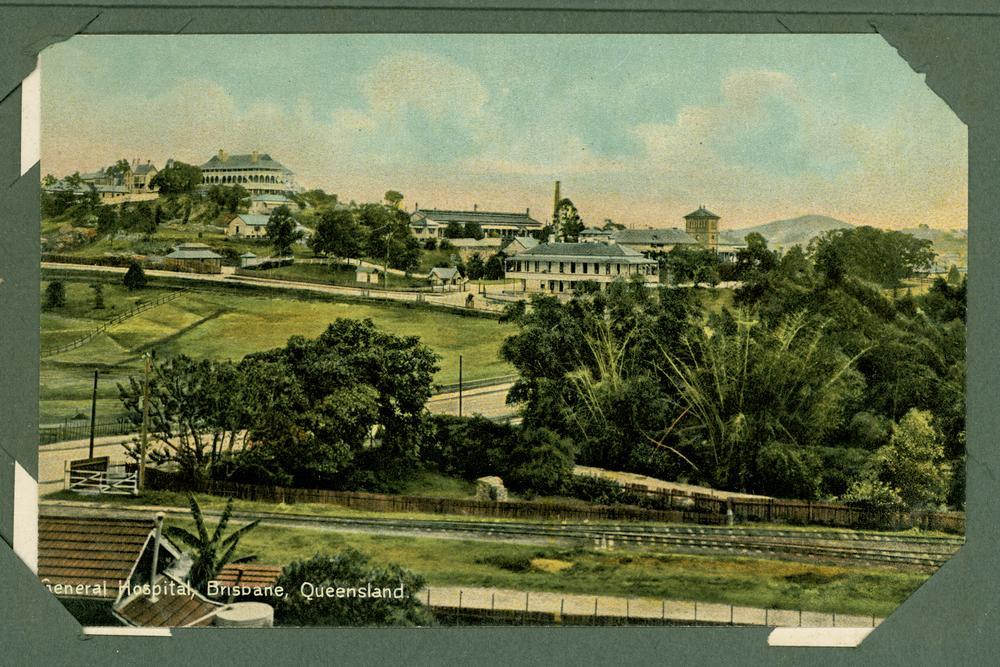
- Brisbane General Hospital, circa 1906

- Location within Queensland Location within Australia
- 27.4486°S 153.0273°E
- Location: 40 Bowen Bridge Road, Herston, City of Brisbane, Queensland, Australia

History
- Design period: 1870s–1890s (late 19th century)
- Built: 1875–1941

Queensland Heritage Register
- Official name: Brisbane General Hospital Precinct, Royal Brisbane Hospital, Herston Hospitals Complex (current name), Royal Children's Hospital, Royal Women's Hospital
- Type: state heritage (built)
- Designated: 28 March 2003
- Reference no.: 601903
- Significant period: 1875–1941 (fabric); 1867–1917, 1917–ongoing (historical, social)
- Significant components: terracing, garden – ornamental/flower, ward – block, pathway/walkway, driveway, wall/s – retaining, trees/plantings, residential accommodation – nurses' quarters, residential accommodation – superintendent's house/quarters

Brisbane General Hospital Precinct is a heritage-listed hospital precinct at 40 Bowen Bridge Road, Herston, City of Brisbane, Queensland, Australia. It was built from 1875 to 1941. It includes six historic buildings associated with the Royal Brisbane and Women's Hospital and the former Royal Children's Hospital, as well as aspects of their grounds and landscaping. It was added to the Queensland Heritage Register on 28 March 2003. A number of buildings in the precinct, in particular the Lady Lamington Nurses Home, will be redeveloped as part of the Herston Quarter development.

== History ==
A landmark group of buildings occupying a large parcel of land bordered by Bowen Bridge Road, Butterfield Street, Garrick Terrace, Bramston Terrace and Herston Road, the Herston Hospitals Complex comprises the Royal Brisbane Hospital, Royal Children's Hospital and Royal Women's Hospital. When established on the site in 1867, the General Hospital contained a ward block with accommodation for 100 patients, a residence for the medical superintendent and a block with kitchen facilities and nurses accommodation. At the end of the 20th century the site contains more than 90 buildings and structures. The place is the largest hospital complex in Australia and provides the most extensive range of general and specialist services, is the major teaching facility for medical, nursing and paramedical training and is a major medical research facility for Queensland.

Initially, the Brisbane General Hospital was managed by a voluntary committee and funded by public subscriptions and government subsidies. In 1863, the Queensland Government established a hospital reserve of 15 acres (6.1 ha) on Bowen Bridge Road which the Hospital Committee reluctantly accepted expressing concern that it was an inconvenient site for the residents of Brisbane. The site, known as "The Quarries", was bounded by Bowen Bridge Road to the east, O'Connell Terrace to the north and the open space of Victoria Park to the west and south. The General Hospital was an impressive two-storeyed, masonry building with a central tower designed by the Queensland Colonial Architect Charles Tiffin and constructed by John Petrie. The building contract was awarded in 1866 to Petrie for a sum of £20,000 and was opened in January 1867.

By the early 1900s the Hospital Committee faced a severe financial crisis. The growth in population was not matched by increases in voluntary contributions and new facilities and upgrading of existing facilities were necessary. Considerable construction work was undertaken during 1909–20 including open air pavilions, new operating theatre, outpatients building, mental ward and extensions to the Lady Lamington Nurses Home.

The Queensland Government assumed control of the Hospital in 1917 after the committee experienced severe financial difficulties in the operation of the hospital facilities. The Hospital Act of 1923 signalled the transition from hospitals operating as charitable institutions to being regarded as essential public community services funded and maintained by government. Developments in medicine, increasing population and changing social conditions and attitudes to health care resulted in increasing numbers of people seeking treatment at the Hospital. The Brisbane and South Coasts Hospitals Board was established in 1924 and assumed responsibility for the General Hospital and Hospital for Sick Children.

The 19th century British convention of local authorities administering isolation or infectious diseases hospitals was adopted in Queensland when the Health Act of 1900 vested responsibility for the treatment of persons with infectious diseases with local authorities. Responding to this legislation, the Metropolitan Joint Board for Infectious Diseases was formed in Brisbane and in 1902 the Wattlebrae Infectious Disease Hospital was established on property adjacent to the Hospital for Sick Children. Substantial buildings for the Wattlebrae Hospital were designed by the architectural firm Hall and Dods. Constructed in 1911 the complex included four open air pavilions with a small central brick building for ablutions and a two-storey timber administration block. Three open air pavilions and the administration block were demolished in 1999.

=== 1866–1923 ===
From 1866 to 1923 there was an intense program of building on the site in response to increasing demands for health care from a growing population. Building constructed during this time include the General Hospital Tower Block (1866), Nurses' Quarters (1866), Surgeon's Cottage (1866), Fever Ward (Ward 6) (1875), Male and Female Fever Wards (1880), Hospital for Sick Children (1884), Children's Fever Ward (1884), Outpatients Building (1885), Operating Theatre (1887), Female Wards (5 and 7) (1885), Lady Norman Block (1895), Lady Lamington Nurses Home (1896), O'Connell Block (1899), Courier Building (1908), Wattlebrae Infectious Diseases Hospital Open Air Pavilions (1911), Wattlebrae Administration Block (1911), Outpatients Department (1916), Ward 16 (1918), Mortuary Chapel (1918), Edith Cavell Block (1922) and a number of ancillary buildings and structures. The following buildings constructed during this period remain on the site:

=== Fever Ward (now Building 19) ===
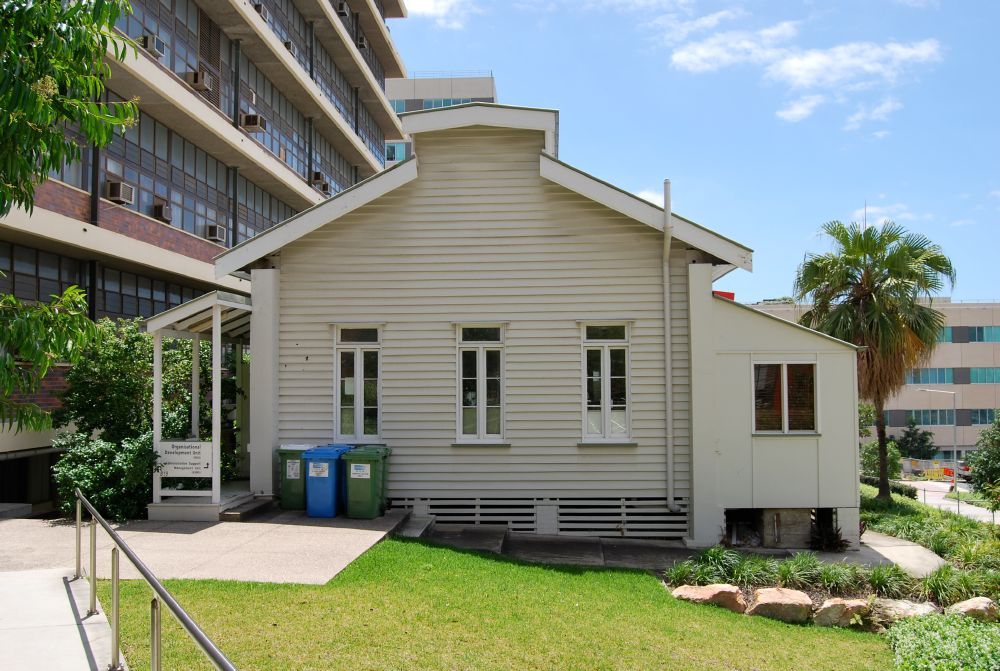
The Fever Ward of the hospital

The Hospital expanded throughout the 19th century in response to increased demands for health care from a growing population. The building program included a single storey brick building for the treatment of fever cases erected in 1875 to the north of the site overlooking O'Connell Terrace. Modelled on the pavilion plan, this building contained a single open ward surrounded by verandahs providing accommodation for twenty-five patients. Known as Ward 6 it was converted to a gynaecological ward in 1890 and with adjacent wards 5 and 7 constructed in 1885 became the focus of female health care in the Hospital. In 1999, Ward 6 remains as building 19 (Wardsmen's Amenity Building).

=== Lady Norman Wing ===
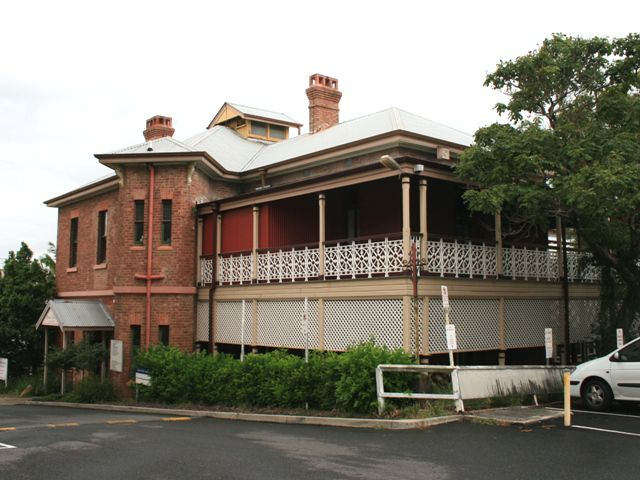
The Lady Norman wing was used for sick children

The Hospital for Sick Children was established in 1883 in a two-storeyed timber building to the western end of the site. Responding to the constant problem of overcrowding in the Children's Hospital, a two-storeyed brick building, designed by John James Clark and Charles McLay, was constructed in 1895 to the pavilion plan and named the Lady Norman Wing in honour of the wife of Queensland Governor Sir Henry Norman who opened the building. Between 1908 and 1923 major development of the Children's Hospital was undertaken in response to the increasing population and advances in medicine and surgery.

=== Edith Cavell Block ===
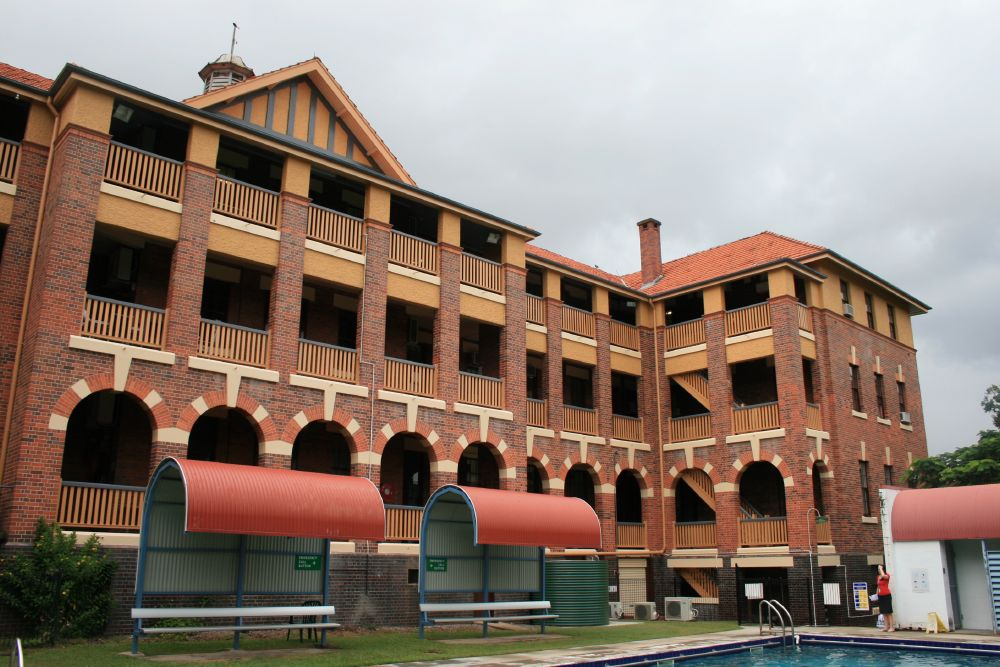
The Edith Cavell Block of the hospital

The Hospital Committee purchased a portion of the Herston Estate and erected the Edith Cavell Nurses' Home to accommodate the increasing numbers of nurses required for the expanding Children's Hospital. Designed by the Department of Public Works, the building was completed in 1922. The building was named in honour of Edith Cavell, a British nurse executed for helping refugees escape in Brussels during World War I. A swimming pool with associated landscaping was constructed to the north of the building in 1958 and the area remains one of the few extensive open spaces on the site.

=== Mental Ward: Ward 16 (Ward 15) ===
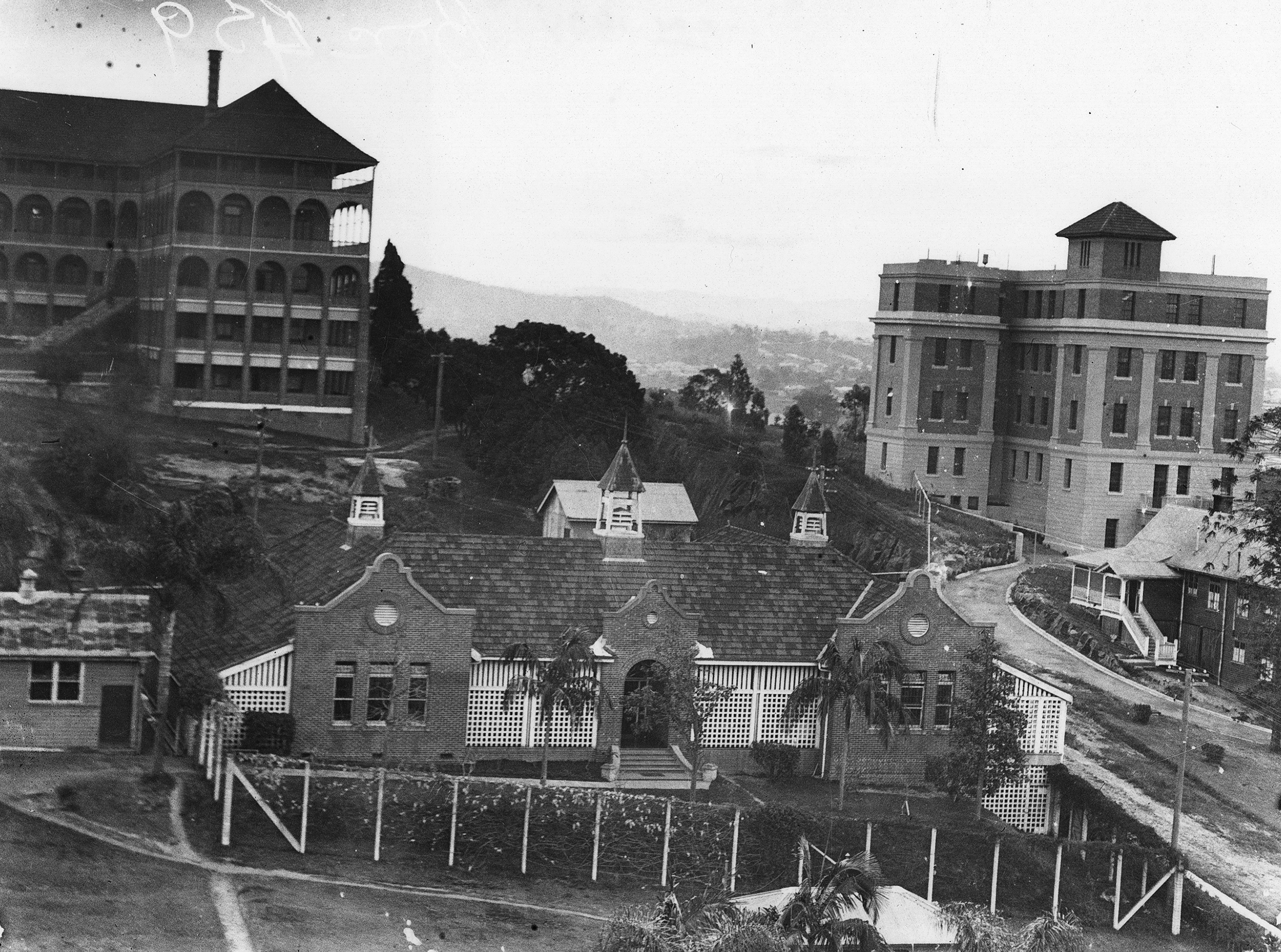
View of Brisbane General Hospital with number 14 ward in the foreground, circa 1934

In 1918 a single-storey, brick building was constructed to accommodate patients with mild psychiatric problems. Known as Ward 16, it heralded a new approach in the treatment of mental illness. Previously patients requiring psychiatric treatment could only be admitted to hospitals for the insane at Goodna, Ipswich and Toowoomba. This was the first ward in a general hospital in Queensland to provide treatment for the mentally ill. Initiative for constructing this ward came from Henry Byam Ellerton, Inspector of Hospitals for the Insane who was closely involved in the design with the Department of Public Works. Responsibility for individual projects within the Department of Public Works is seldom clear-cut but the files of the Department suggest that Thomas Pye had a major influence on the design of projects in the office during this time. Residential in scale and characteristic of the Arts and Crafts architectural style, the U-shaped building accommodated male and female patients in separate wings divided into cells, a marked difference from the dormitory type buildings at contemporary mental hospitals. The garden was an important element of the setting of the building with grassed areas to the front planted with trees. Following increased demand to accommodate acute alcoholics and prisoners requiring medical treatment locked cells were erected to the rear in 1948. The rear portion was known as Ward 14 and front became known as Ward 16. In 1958 the former Wattlebrae Infectious Diseases Hospital (1930) was converted into a psychiatric unit and named Lowson House and Ward 16 became known as Ward 15. The building currently houses offices. Externally, the building retains its original form except that front parapets have been removed from the north and south wings and infilled with fibrous cement sheeting, the front verandahs to the main wing have been enclosed with glass and metal louvres and the verandahs to the north and south wings have been enclosed with timber and glass. The building interior has been altered but the integrity of the building form and plan remains.

=== 1923–1945 ===
Between 1926 and 1938, there was a major redevelopment of the Brisbane General Hospital with the construction of blocks 1 (1928), 2 (1930), 3 (1938) and 4 (1937); service buildings including the laundry (1926), kitchen (1935) and boiler house (1935); and additional staff accommodation including major extensions to the Lady Lamington Nurses' Home.

=== Superintendent's Residence (Social Workers' Office) ===
Located to the east of the Lady Lamington Nurses' Home, the Residence for the Medical Superintendent designed by Atkinson and Conrad in an Old English style was completed in 1941. Aubrey Pye, was the first Superintendent to occupy this residence. In office from 1935 to 1967, Pye was the longest serving Superintendent of the Hospital, presiding over a period of extraordinary development and dramatic change. The building is now used as offices by social workers. Few changes have been made to the building.

=== 1945 to the 1990s ===
By the end of the 1930s the site had become the largest hospital complex in Australia and has continued to expand to the late 1990s except for disruptions during 1940–45 caused by World War II. During the 1950s new buildings included the Lady Ramsey Wing, a nurses home for the Women's Hospital. From the mid-1950s an increasing proportion of the capital works budget was devoted to facilities and equipment for support services. The first major building on the site to specifically accommodate specialist services, Block 8 commenced in 1956 and built in three stages over fourteen years, accommodated the pathology department and the Queensland Radium Institute. The continuing role in medical education was reflected in the construction of the Edwin Tooth Lecture Theatre (1957) and the Clinical Sciences building (1966). During the 1970s, the major building project was the fourteen-storey Block 7 completed in 1977 with accommodation for casualty and outpatients, general wards and administration.

Hospital blocks 1, 2, and 3, built successively in the early 1930s, were demolished and their site on Bowen Bridge Road now occupied by the Education Centre and Centre for Clinical Research. The first coronary care unit was established in Ward 1A in 1971. The Women’s Hospital was demolished and now occupied by the James Mayne Building.

Block 7 was organised, for example, as follows: main entrance on Lower Ground (street level on the corner of Bowen Bridge and Herston Roads), emergency department on Ground, radiology on the 2nd floor, operating theatres and intensive care unit on the 6th floor, and a staff recreation area on the top floor. The emergency department was previously on the ground floor between blocks 2 and 3.

An aerial passageway linking the Women’s and Royal Brisbane Hospitals was completed in 1979. Blocks 6 and 9 were completed in 1984. Block 6 was a non-clinical building and block 9 housed radiotherapy, haematology and oncology wards. The multi-story carpark, with aerial walkway into Block 7, was opened in 1985.

Redevelopment and expansion of the Hospital has continued from 1970s with demolition, construction of new buildings, additions and renovations to existing stock and acquisition of additional property. More recent developments include new blocks for the Children's Hospital and the Queensland Institute for Medical Research. An extensive redevelopment of the northern part of the site has been undertaken during the 1990s and is expected to reach completion around 2004.

=== The grounds and landscaping ===
The grounds contain strong evidence of the layering and close conjunction of garden areas or elements from different periods of hospital development. The steepness of the site has required terracing and stone retaining walls for major buildings and roads. The site contains a wide range of landscaping elements. The use of porphyry, obtained from quarries on site, is a major element of the landscaping. One of the most striking walls is the large porphyry wall to Bowen Bridge Road constructed in the 1930s as a result of a road widening.

Roads, pathways and walls throughout the site demonstrate the early planning and subsequent development of the site.

The roadway from Bramston Terrace running between the Lady Norman Wing and the Edith Cavell block was formerly part of O'Connell Terrace and was the main entrance to the Children's Hospital. The pathway connecting the Lady Lamington Nurses' Home to the main Hospital complex is an integral element of the site.

The hospital grounds have two distinct garden styles - the 1930s hybrid character of picturesque and gardenesque beds and stone work and the more recent style of mixed shrubbery of native and exotic plants. Distinctive features of the grounds include the planting of large flowering trees (in particular Poinciana and Jacaranda); palms; large shade trees (Ficus and camphor laurel) and pines (hoop pine, bunya pine, Callitris and kauri).

The Lady Norman Wing, Edith Cavell Block, Superintendent's Residence, Ward 15 and Lady Lamington Nurses' Home form a gardened residential precinct within the Hospital site.

== Description ==
=== Former Pavilion Ward: Fever Ward (building 19) ===
The former pavilion ward, constructed in 1875, is important as a rare example of a single-storey 19th century pavilion plan ward. As the oldest ward on the site, the place is important in demonstrating the early development of the hospital.

The former Fever Ward, now the wardsmen's amenities building, is a rectangular, single-storey, brick building located towards the middle of the site overlooking the portion of O'Connell Terrace within the Hospital complex. The building contains a single open ward with timber verandahs to the north, east and west with a timber pedimented entrance to O'Connell Terrace. Despite demolition of part of the building and the enclosure of verandahs, the remaining fabric including the verandahs, doors, windows and clerestory, demonstrate its previous form as a pavilion ward. The connecting link with the adjoining pavilion ward remains. The interior has been altered but the original queen post trusses and timber ceiling remain intact above a suspended plasterboard ceiling.

=== Lady Norman Wing (C18) ===
The Lady Norman Wing, important in demonstrating the early development of the Children's Hospital, was opened in 1896 and is the only building surviving from the pre-1920 era of the Children's Hospital complex. Built in response to problems of overcrowding in the children's hospital, the building is a well designed two-storey late Victorian hospital block based on the pavilion plan. The building was designed by architects JJ Clark and CH McLay, who both made important contributions to Queensland architecture including the Treasury Building (JJ Clark) and the Customs House (CH McLay).

An L-shaped, two-storey brick building designed to the pavilion plan, each floor consists of a large ward with a smaller ward opening onto wide verandahs. Two brick towers with distinctive pyramidal roofs attach to the western side of the building accommodating ablutions facilities. Recently refurbished to accommodate administration facilities for the Children's Hospital, the building retains the principal spaces and planning. Many original features remain including a large internal staircase and brick towers to the west. The upper ward has been partitioned for offices but the lower ward remains as one space. Many internal finishes are intact. The corrugated iron ceiling to part of the upper floor remains.

=== Lady Lamington Nurses Home ===
The Lady Lamington Nurses Home was separately listed on the Queensland Heritage Register in 1992.

=== Mental Ward (Ward 15) ===
Originally known as Ward 16, this single-storey red facebrick building constructed in 1918 heralded a new approach in the treatment of mental illness. This was the first ward in a general hospital in Queensland to provide treatment for the mentally ill and was the forerunner of psychiatric wards attached to general hospitals. Henry Byam Ellerton, Inspector of Hospitals for the Insane from 1909 to 1937 was instrumental in initiating the concept of mental health facilities as part of a general hospital and was influential in the design of Ward 15. The building is important for its later use as a hospital for prisoners and acute alcoholics.

Located within the garden setting for the Lady Lamington Nurses' Home and the Superintendent's Residence, Ward 15 is a single-storey, U-shaped building to the northeast of the Lady Lamington Nurses' Home. Residential in scale, the detailing and massing are characteristic of the Arts and Crafts idiom. Symmetrical about a rectangular central wing which terminates in rectangular wings to the north and south, the building is distinguished by the steeply pitched roofs covered with terracotta tiles and three large roof ventilators. Approached from the east up a flight of concrete steps from the garden below, the central arched entrance of the main wing sits beneath a bullseye vent within a bell-shaped parapet with a decorative concrete capping. The verandahs flanking the main entrance have been enclosed with glazing. The parapets to the north and south wings have been removed and are now sheeted with fibrous cement. Verandahs to the north and south wings have been enclosed.

=== Edith Cavell Block (27) ===
The Edith Cavell Block is important in the development of the Children's Hospital during the early twentieth century. Constructed in 1922 to accommodate the increasing numbers of nurses required for the expanding Children's Hospital, the building was designed by the Department of Public Works and is a good example of a public building in the Arts and Crafts idiom. The building is enhanced by the swimming pool and open space with mature plantings to the north established in 1958. The building is a memorial to Sister Edith Cavell (1865–1915), a British nurse executed by a German firing squad in 1915 for assisting in the escape of allied prisoners in Brussels. The portico entrance contains a marble and sandstone memorial commemorating the laying of the foundation stone by the Governor, Sir Matthew Nathan.

Dramatically posed on the west ridge at the summit of the steeply sloping Hospital site, the Edith Cavell Block affords sweeping views across to the north of Brisbane. The building is a three-storey, H-shaped, facebrick building with a partial basement. The south elevation is symmetrical about a projecting central bay with a polychrome arched loggia entrance at ground level. This bay is divided by brick piers between which there are concrete spandrel infills and sash windows. The central wing terminates in pavilions to the east and west. The external walls are faced at ground and first floor level with glazed brown bricks and above with a rough cast finish. The south elevation has a regular rhythm of flat arched window openings with prominent rendered keystones and rendered sills. The striking north elevation consists of a polychrome arched loggia to the ground level opening from the building to the garden and swimming pool area. Verandahs to the first and second floors are divided into bays by brick piers and infilled with painted timber slat balustrading. These verandahs overlook the garden and swimming pool. The associated grounds of the Edith Cavell Block form part of the larger residential precinct associated with the Lady Lamington Nurses' Home, Superintendent's Residence and Ward 15.

=== Superintendent's Residence (22) ===
The former Superintendent's Residence (now the Social Workers' Office) is important in demonstrating the practice of accommodating the medical superintendent on the Hospital site. The medical superintendent had resided on the hospital site since 1866. Constructed in 1941, this building replaced two earlier residences. Aubrey Pye, medical superintendent from 1933 to 1967, was the first superintendent to occupy this residence. Pye exercised significant influence over the administration of the Hospital and oversaw major changes and expansion to all facets of the Hospital activities. Residential in scale and materials, the former residence belongs to a cohesive group of residential buildings in the centre of the Hospital site. The building was refurbished in 1966. It is no longer used as a residence and now accommodates offices.

Situated to the east of the Lady Lamington Nurses' Home and between the now demolished resident medical officers' quarters and Ward 15, the building forms part of a well defined group of residential buildings in the centre of the Hospital complex. The building was skilfully designed and detailed in the Old English style by architects Conrad and Gargett. A two-storey building, the lower floor is constructed in cavity brickwork and the upper floor is stucco over a timber stud frame. The house has a tiled roof and a distinctive asymmetrical front elevation to the east. The lower level contains living rooms and the upper floor contains bedrooms. Maids quarters are provided in a single storey semi-detached portion to the rear. There is a distinctive decorative bargeboard above a large bay window to the north of the arched entrance. The form and integrity of the place remain. The associated north lawn and planted gardens are part of the larger residential precinct of the Lady Lamington Nurses' Home, Lady Norm Wing, Edith Cavell Block and Ward 15.

=== Grounds and landscaping elements ===
The grounds contain strong evidence of the layering and close conjunction of garden areas or elements from different periods of hospital development. The steepness of the site has required terracing and stone retaining walls for major buildings and roads. The site contains a wide range of landscaping elements.

The use of porphyry, obtained from quarries on site, is a major element of the landscaping. One of the most striking walls is the large porphyry wall to Bowen Bridge Road constructed in the 1930s as a result of a road widening.

Roads, pathways and walls throughout the site demonstrate the early planning and subsequent development of the site.

The roadway from Bramston Terrace running between the Lady Norman Wing and the Edith Cavell block was formerly part of O'Connell Terrace and was the main entrance to the Children's Hospital. The pathway connecting the Lady Lamington Nurses' Home to the main Hospital complex is an integral element of the site.

The grounds associated with the Edith Cavell Block are one of the few open spaces remaining on the site and provide the building with a pleasant garden setting and opportunities for sweeping views across the north of Brisbane. The garden area contains a fenced swimming pool area with garden seats, mature plantings and a stone edged circular bed. Two large poincianas remain from early planting.

The garden area surrounding the Lady Lamington Nurses' Home, the Superintendent's Residence and Ward 15 is the most extensive area of landscaping on the site. This area contains two mature poincianas on the southern lawn terrace, concrete paths with brick edging, circular stone edged beds with azaleas around palms, two Queen palms, two phoenix dactylifera, two livistona palms, a circular rose bed, camphor laurels, jacarandas and a number of other mature trees. There are two poincianas on the terrace of Ward 15, along with a path with raised porphyry edging, steps at the upper end and a stone spoon drain, stone edged rose beds, mature araucaria cunninghamii and ficus.

The associated grounds of the Lady Norman Wing, Edith Cavell Block, Superintendent's Residence, Ward 15 and the Lady Lamington Nurses' Home form the residential precinct within the Hospital site.

== Heritage listing ==
Brisbane General Hospital Precinct was listed on the Queensland Heritage Register on 28 March 2003 having satisfied the following criteria.

The place is important in demonstrating the evolution or pattern of Queensland's history.

The Brisbane General Hospital Precinct is important for its association with the development of hospital health care in Queensland since 1866 and in demonstrating on the one site the major changes in hospital health care since that time. The place demonstrates changes in government involvement in the financing and control of health services in Queensland from the mid-nineteenth century. The place is important for its association with the development of nursing training, medical education and medical research in Queensland.

As the oldest ward on the site, the Fever Ward is important in demonstrating the early development of the Hospital.

The Mental Ward (known as Ward 16, now known as Ward 15) is important in demonstrating changing attitudes in the treatment of patients with mental illnesses in Queensland. The place is important for its later use as a hospital for the treatment of prisoners and acute alcoholics.

The Edith Cavell Block is important in demonstrating the development of the Children's Hospital during the early 20th century.

The place demonstrates rare, uncommon or endangered aspects of Queensland's cultural heritage.

The Fever Ward (now Building 19) is important as a rare example of a single-storey 19th century pavilion plan ward.

The place is important in demonstrating the principal characteristics of a particular class of cultural places.

The Lady Norman Wing is important in demonstrating the early development of the Children's Hospital and is a fine example of a well planned two-storey late Victorian hospital block.

The Superintendent's Residence (now the Social Workers' Office) is important in demonstrating the practice of accommodating the medical superintendent on the site since the 1860s.

The following buildings have been identified as being of cultural heritage significance satisfying one or more criteria as contained in the Queensland Cultural Heritage Act 1992:

- Fever Ward. 1875. Now Building 19
- Lady Norman Wing. 1895. Building C18.
- Mental Ward. 1918. Building 15.
- Edith Cavell Block. 1922. Building 27.
- Superindendent's Residence (1941), Building 22
- Lady Lamington Nurses Home (1897–1938), Building 25

These elements of the grounds and landscaping have been identified as being of cultural heritage significance satisfying one or more of the criteria of the Queensland Heritage Act 1992:

- Roadway from Bramston Terrace between Lady Norman wing and Edith Cavell block
- Pathway from Lady Lamington Nurses' Home to main hospital complex
- Bowen Bridge Road porphyry wall
- Edith Cavell associated grounds
- Associated grounds for Lady Lamington Nurses' Home, former Superindendent's Residence, and Ward 15

The place is important because of its aesthetic significance.

The Brisbane General Hospital Precinct is notable for the collective quality of groups of buildings and landscaping elements. The place is important for the range of building types and architectural idioms employed, the extensiveness site and the dramatic sitings made possible by the steeply sloping site.

Occupying a prominent site on Bowen Bridge Road, a major arterial road for Brisbane, the place is a major landmark within the inner northern suburbs townscape. The porphyry wall to Bowen Bridge Road provides an imposing presence to this Road and has a synonymous association with the Hospital. The drama of the view up hill towards Lady Lamington Nurses' Home contrasts with the repose of the garden setting for the Superintendent's Residence and Ward 15 nestled in the gully below. The Edith Cavell Block and associated grounds occupy the upper west ridge of the site and command sweeping views across the north of Brisbane.

The garden setting amplifies the picturesque presentation of the building (the Mental Ward) and provides an area of repose within the Hospital.

A substantial 1920s public building in the Arts and Crafts idiom sited on the western ridge of the steeply sloping site, the Edith Cavell commands a dramatic view to the north and its striking north elevation is enhanced by the open space and mature plantings to the rear of the building.

Discrete in scale and materials it (the Superindendent's Residence) belongs to a cohesive group of residential buildings within a garden setting in the centre of the Hospital site.

These designated roads, pathways, walls and gardens are important in demonstrating early planning and subsequent development of the Hospital site and contribute to the aesthetic qualities of the settings of the structures, buildings and groups of buildings on the site: the roadway from Bramston Terrace between Lady Norman Wing and the Edith Cavell Block; the pathway from the Lady Lamington Nurses' Home to the main Hospital complex; the porphyry wall to Bowen Bridge Road; the grounds associated with the Edith Cavell Block; the grounds associated with the Lady Lamington Nurses' Home, Superintendent's Residence and Ward 15.

The Lady Norman Wing, the Edith Cavell Block, the Superintendent's Residence, Ward 15 and the Lady Lamington Nurses' Home are important as a residential precinct within the Hospital site.

The place is important in demonstrating a high degree of creative or technical achievement at a particular period.

The Mental Ward was the first ward in Queensland attached to a general hospital for the treatment of patients with acute psychiatric disorders and a model for other psychiatric wards within a general hospital.

The place has a strong or special association with a particular community or cultural group for social, cultural or spiritual reasons.

The Brisbane General Hospital Precinct has a special association for the Brisbane community as the principal hospital complex in the City since 1866.

The place has a special association with the life or work of a particular person, group or organisation of importance in Queensland's history.

The Brisbane General Hospital Precinct is important for its association with major figures in the development of medicine and health services in Queensland including Aubrey Pye and HB Ellerton. The Brisbane General Hospital Precinct is important for its association with the work of architects Hall and Dods; JJ Clark and CH McLay; architects of the Department of Public Works.

The Lady Norman Wing is important for its association with the work of architects JJ Clark and CH McLay.

The Mental Ward is important for its association with HB Ellerton who was instrumental in introducing the concept to Queensland and was influential in the design of this Ward.

The Edith Cavell Block is important for its association with the Department of Public Works.

The Superindendent's Residence is important for its association with Aubrey Pye, medical superintendent from 1933 to 1967, and the first superintendent to occupy this residence.

== Notable staff ==
- Beryl Emma Burbridge OBE (1902–1988) trained here and was the general matron from 1958 to 1968.
- Errol Solomon Meyers, prominent Brisbane doctor and one of the founding fathers of the University of Queensland School of Medicine
