= Victoria Park Golf Clubhouse =

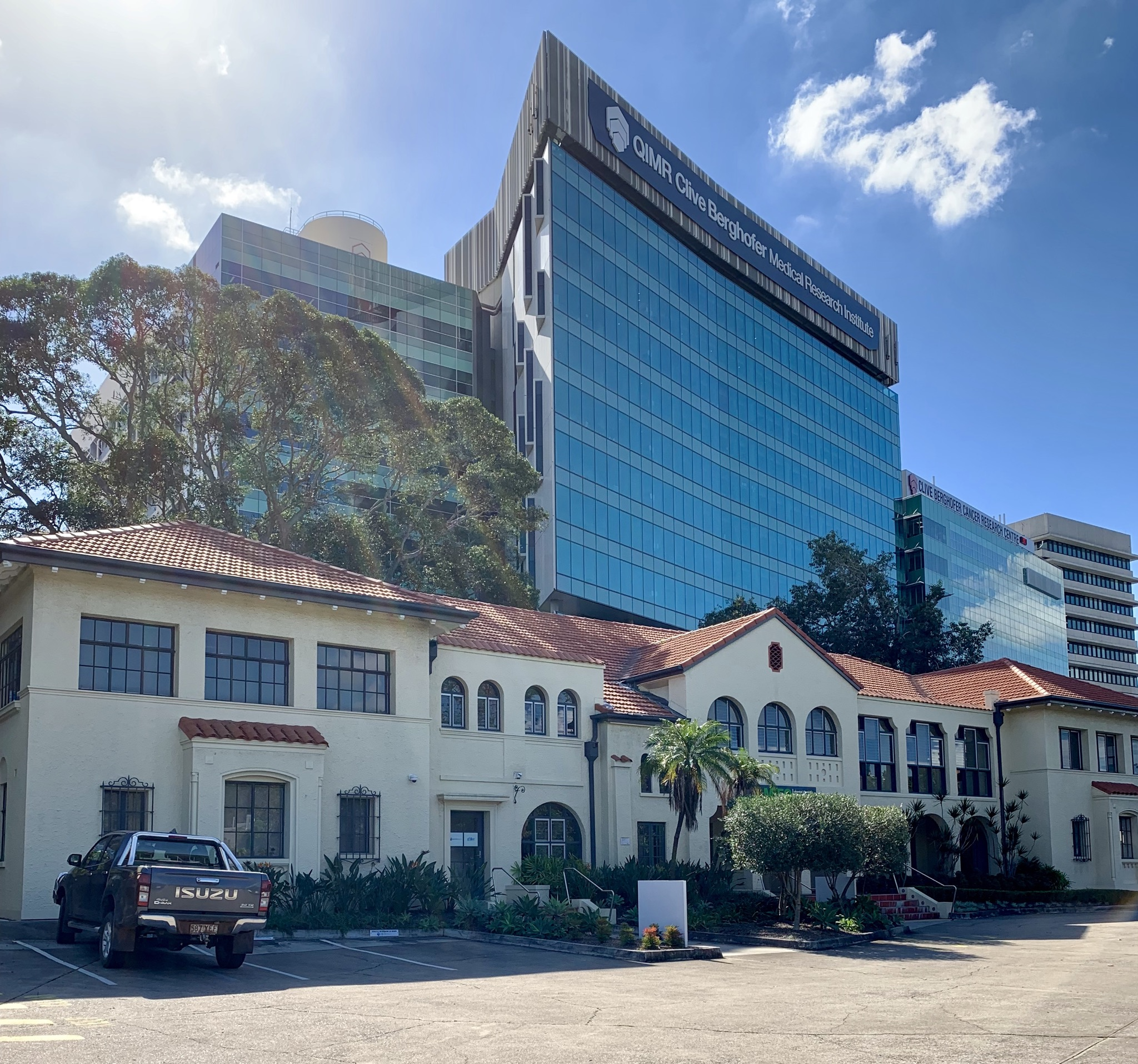
- Former Victoria Park Golf Clubhouse, 2019

- Location within Queensland Location within Australia
- 27.4501°S 153.0267°E
- Location: 309 Herston Road, Herston, City of Brisbane, Queensland, Australia

History
- Design period: 1919–1930s (interwar period)
- Built: 1931, 1939, 1948

Site notes
- Architect: Reyburn Jameson
- Architectural style: Spanish Mission

Queensland Heritage Register
- Official name: Victoria Park Golf Clubhouse (former), Lone Parents Club
- Type: state heritage (built)
- Designated: 17 December 1999
- Reference no.: 602034
- Significant period: 1931, 1939, 1948 (fabric); 1931–1975 (historical/social)
- Significant components: wall/s – retaining, trees/plantings, dance floor, residential accommodation – staff quarters, steps/stairway

The Victoria Park Golf Clubhouse is a heritage-listed former club house at 309 Herston Road, Herston, City of Brisbane, Queensland, Australia. It was designed by Reyburn Jameson and built in 1931 and extended in 1939 and 1948. It is also known as the Pink Palace, after a nightclub which operated out of the building in the late 1970s and 1980s. The building now serves as offices for the Mental Illness Fellowship of Queensland. It was added to the Queensland Heritage Register on 17 December 1999.

== History ==
The Victoria Park Golf Clubhouse was constructed in two stages, 1931 and 1939, as the clubhouse for Brisbane's first municipal golf links, established in Victoria Park in 1930–1931.

The modern game of golf originated in Scotland in the 18th century. By the late 19th century it was popular throughout Britain, and in the 1880s and 1890s, British immigrants established golf clubs throughout the British Empire.

Golf was introduced to Queensland in the 1880s by two Scots, Francis Ivory and his brother Alexander, who laid out a six-hole course on their Eidsvold cattle station, near Gayndah. Golf courses at Ravenshoe and Townsville (1893) are the first recorded Queensland courses. The Brisbane Golf Club, formed in 1890, was the first organised golf club in Queensland. It established a course at Chelmer in 1896 and subsequently relocated to Yeerongpilly in 1904. It was a private club, attracted the patronage of Lord Lamington (Governor of Queensland 1896–1901), and until 1920 was the only golf club in Brisbane. The City Golf Club Toowoomba was formed in 1896 with a nine-hole course on Drayton Road and the Ipswich City Golf Club was established in 1897.

However, golfing was not widespread in Queensland by the turn of the century. The game was the preserve of the affluent, with founders and club members mostly from professional and business sectors. High membership fees and the cost of golfing equipment often excluded the less well-to-do from the sport.

Queensland entered a period of prosperity in the 1920s, which engendered a new enthusiasm for public sport and recreation. Bowling and golfing in particularly became very popular. Many new players were women, who had gained a greater social freedom during World War I, although generally in golf clubs they were admitted as associates rather than as full members.

Several new private golf clubs were established in Brisbane in the 1920s: the Royal Queensland Golf Club at Hamilton in 1920, followed by clubs at Sandgate (1921), Wynnum (1923), Goodna (now Gailes) (1924), Indooroopilly (1926), Oxley (1928) and Nudgee (1929). A round of golf was considered to be eighteen holes but by 1929 there were only three eighteen-hole courses in Brisbane: Brisbane, Royal Queensland and Indooroopilly. The other Brisbane courses were nine-hole courses played twice to achieve the stipulated round.

In the 1920s, municipal golf courses were established throughout Australia, enabling broader social access to the game. Successful municipal courses established in Sydney (1920) and Adelaide (1922), which provided the public with affordable facilities and at the same time generated municipal revenue, stimulated moves for the creation of Queensland municipal courses. The Queensland Golfing Association, eager to foster golf in Queensland, first approached the Mayor of Brisbane in 1922 with a proposal for a nine-hole municipal course at Victoria Park. In 1924 the Toowong Town Council investigated the possibility of establishing a municipal course on One Tree Hill (Mt Coot-tha) and Taringa Shire Council also investigated developing a course, but both proposals were abandoned. In 1923 the Ipswich City Council took over the Ipswich Golf Club and established the first municipal course in Queensland, with public play commencing in 1924.

Following the formation of Greater Brisbane in 1925, the Brisbane City Council prioritised the provision of parks and public reserves, and the establishment of sport and recreation facilities within these areas. A large section of Victoria Park – established in York's Hollow in 1865 – had been reserved as the site for a new University of Queensland since c. 1906, and had lain largely undeveloped. When the university announced in 1926 its decision to build at St Lucia instead, the Queensland Golf Association again raised the issue of establishing municipal golf links at Victoria Park. This time the proposal was greeted with enthusiasm by the council. Both the first Lord Mayor of Greater Brisbane, Alderman William Jolly, and the Town Clerk, Stanley Eldred Travill, were tireless supporters for the establishment and development of the municipal golf course at Victoria Park. Jolly became the inaugural president of the Victoria Park Golf Club and remained in this office until 1934. He was made a life member in 1935 in recognition of his services to the club. The proposal was supported also by Parks Superintendent Harry Moore, who estimated that the cost of developing the land as a park would be £50,000 to £60,000 – far in excess of the cost of establishing a golf links.

Some delay in implementation was experienced due to the slow process of transferring much of Victoria Park back to the City Council. A course was designed by Stan Francis, who laid plans before the council in February 1930 and who supervised the laying out. Much of the work on the course was completed under the Intermittent Relief Scheme, and was well in hand by September 1930 when the council put out tenders for the construction of the clubhouse. This building was situated at the northeast corner of the course because it allowed players to return in an easterly direction, as advised by Francis. It was also close to the tram along Bowen Bridge Road, which was convenient for players. The clubhouse was designed in the office of the City Architect, Alfred Herbert Foster, with plans drawn by Assistant Architect Reyburn Jameson. The building was in the Spanish Mission style, popular for recreational interwar buildings such as bathing pavilions and picture theatres, and which had been used in the design of the council's Moora Park Kiosk at Sandgate (erected 1928).

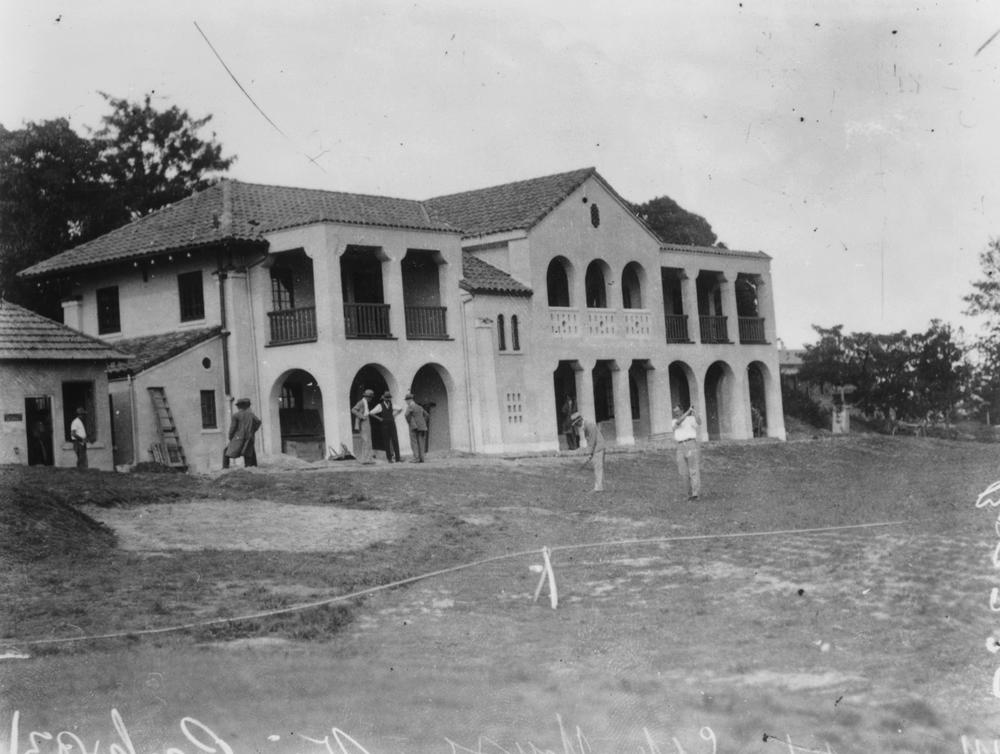
The 1931 clubhouse

Work on the clubhouse commenced early in 1931, and it was ready for occupation in September. The links were completed a couple of months later, and the Victoria Park Golf Course was opened officially on 20 November 1931. Final construction cost for the course and clubhouse was £13,919 (course £9,794; clubhouse £4,125).

To ensure the successful functioning of the new course, the Victoria Park Golf Club was formed at a public meeting on 20 March 1931, at which it was confirmed that the council provided the course, clubhouse, the salaries of a club secretary and club professional, and assumed responsibility for the upkeep of the course, while the club members were responsible for the operations of the club. Any casual player was entitled to play the course without joining the club, on payment of the appropriate green fees.

The Victoria Park Golf Clubhouse boasted every modern facility, but no bar, as many members of the council were not in favour of making alcohol available. There were protests about this lack, both as a facility to members and as a revenue-earner. The council eventually gave permission for a bar, which was opened on New Year's Day, 1935.

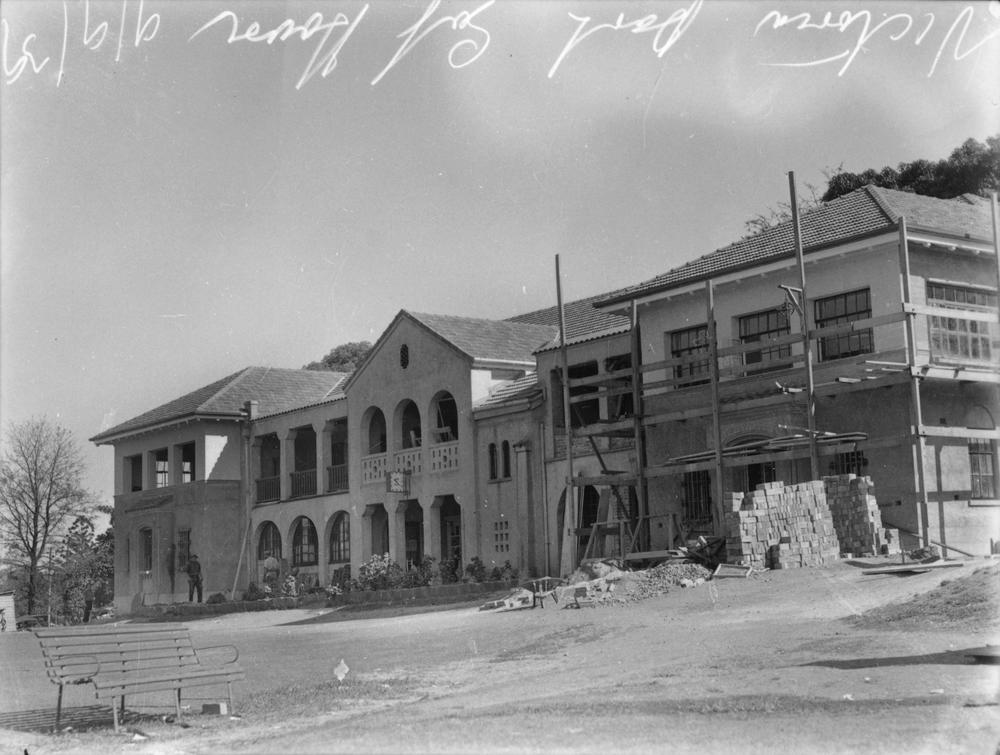
Constructing the 1939 extensions

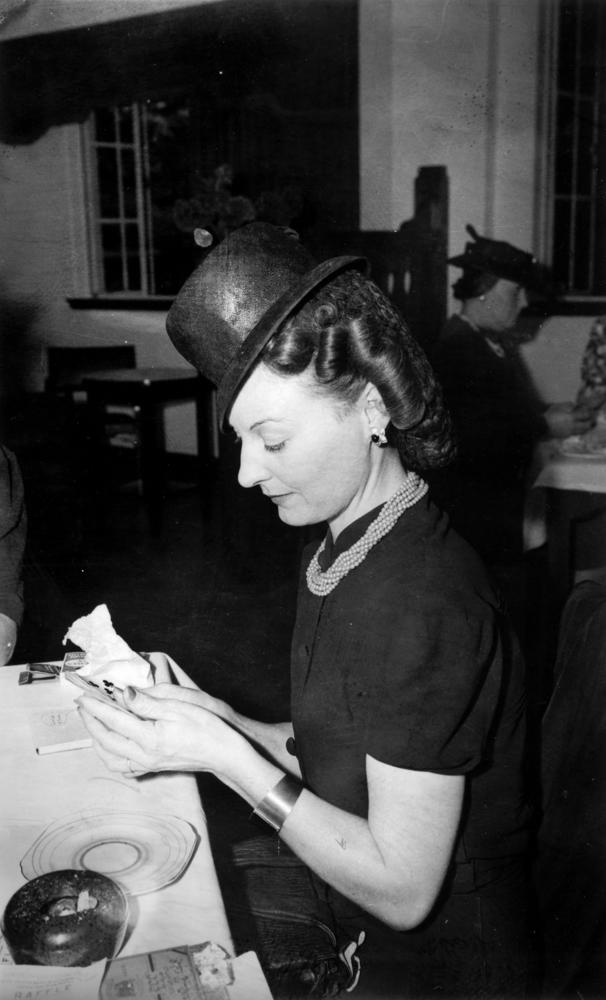
Associates (women members) playing cards, 1940

During the depression years of the 1930s many private golf clubs lost membership, but that of the Victoria Park Golf Club doubled between 1933 and 1937. In response to this expansion and to be able to continue to attract membership, the clubhouse was extended and remodelled in 1939 by City Architect, Harold Erwood. Wings were added to either side of the existing building, with the additions and alterations focussing on improved member and associate services and facilities, including new lounge and dining room areas with a timber dance floor upstairs; a doubling of locker space, toilet and shower facilities; private rooms; modern kitchen; independent access for women; and new exterior lighting. The upper floor also provided new living accommodation for the club secretary, in the eastern wing. The layout, incorporating facilities for women in the west wing and those for men in the east wing, reflected a marked social separation between the sexes. The extended building opened on 26 October 1939 and continued in use throughout the Second World War, despite the original 17th and 18th fairways being occupied as a military encampment. The lounge area of the clubhouse was extended in 1948 and the ground floor was refurbished in 1963.

The Victoria Park Golf Clubhouse was one of the larger public buildings erected by the Greater Brisbane Council, and the golf links remained the only municipal course in Brisbane until the establishment of the St Lucia Golf Course in 1985. Other civic work produced by the Brisbane City Architect's office during the interwar period included bandstand rotundas, kiosks, dressing sheds and toilet blocks. This work ranged across a number of styles and generally care was given to their design. Tramway substations and the New Farm Powerhouse were designed by engineers in the council's Tramways Department.

The course was considered to be one of the finest municipal golf courses in Australia and has been described as the cradle of golf in Brisbane. Under the tutelage of Arthur Everett Gazzard, foundation professional 1931–1972, some players went on to become professional golfers in the Queensland and Australian arenas. In the mid-1970s a new clubhouse was constructed on the brow of the hill between Herston Road and Gilchrist Avenue, and was opened on 14 December 1975. The links were altered so that the ninth and eighteenth holes were near the new clubhouse, changing Francis' orientation of the course. The 1930s clubhouse was vacated at this time.

It was tenanted from 1978 by the Lone Parent Club of Queensland, and through the 1980s operated as a disco venue for single parents known as "The Pink Palace", named for its then brightly painted facade. It was then abandoned for many years, during which time it was vandalised and inhabited by squatters. In 2009–2010, it was restored by its owners, the Brisbane City Council, in order to serve as office space for the Mental Illness Fellowship of Queensland.

== Description ==
The former Victoria Park Golf Clubhouse is a large, freestanding, two-storeyed brick building rendered with a rough cast finish, located in the north-east corner of the Victoria Park Golf Course bounded by Gilchrist Avenue and Herston Road, Herston. The main entrance towards Gilchrist Avenue overlooks Victoria Park below and a bitumen carpark occupies the former putting green terrace between the building and the road.

The main elevation is symmetrical about a centrally projecting gabled entry porch which was the core of the 1931 building. The 1939 alterations and additions are in the non-identical wings flanking the central bay and the terminating pavilions to the east and west. The building conveys the impression of a Spanish-Mission or Mediterranean character established in the 1931 design but the overall impact is of thoughtful classicism within a restrained use of Spanish references.

The three bays of the main entrance porch, now glazed to form an enclosed entry vestibule, are punctuated by square columns with rounded concrete brackets. The balcony above the entrance porch has three round arched openings with decorative concrete balustrade panels. The glazing to these openings was a later addition. A gable vent of curved tiles sits below the low pitched gable roof clad with Marseilles tiles.

Within the west loggia, a stairtower sits between the formal entrance and the minor entry porch which has a decorative roof edge capping of round tiles. The upper loggia has two sets of paired open round arches screened with timber blinds.

At ground level in each of the end pavilions, a projecting central bay capped with round roof tiles is flanked by pairs of casement windows decorated with wrought-iron window grilles. Slender half columns in a stylised Corinthian order define the corners of the bay and casement windows with a scalloped fringed sill are recessed within the bay. At the upper level of each pavilion a continuous sill wraps around the corners below three generous window bays which in the west wing are filled with sets of casement windows and in the east with louvres. The wings have Marseilles-tiled hipped roofs with bracketed eaves.

From Herston Road the tiled roof and upper level of the building peep through the vegetation around the perimeter of the property. This elevation is asymmetrical about a central gabled bay. Three separate pedestrian bridges cross from Herston Road to the upper level connecting with the latticed porch entrance to the living quarters and the dining room.

The south-west and south-east corners continue as wrap-arounds from the main elevation. A plain pilaster with a round tile decorative coping above the capital is located one-third the way along each side elevation and finishes the corner. To the west four bays of metal framed casement windows at the upper level afford views across the Golf Course.

The building plan accommodates access and vertical circulation within the loggias to the front of the building and services and storage along the rear. At ground level the pavilions contain the locker/changing areas. The upper level contains the large dining room, ancillary service areas, meeting spaces and the living quarters in the east pavilion.

From the reception vestibule a metal staircase to the right arrives at the upper level loggia. The reception vestibule opens into the main bar area. Evidence suggests that later openings have been made in the wall between the main bar area and the west pavilion. The stair from here arrives at the upper loggia which connects to the dining area. At ground level, the east wing houses a billiard room and toilet/shower facilities. An acoustic tile ceiling has been inserted in the new reception and main bar areas. Plain plaster ceilings are found elsewhere throughout the ground floor. The toilets in the west wing retain original finishes and the former women's shower area has been altered to accommodate male toilets. The men's shower, change and toilet facilities in the east wing remain.

The upper floor contains a spacious lounge and dining area, kitchen, bar, storage, meeting room and living quarters. Windows to the west offer an extended view across the Golf Course. The low-ceiling of the dining space is punctuated by plain plaster rendered ceiling beams finished with decorative corbels at the wall junctions. An extensive hardwood dance floor survives. The dining area and the meeting room open to the front balcony and east loggia which offer a fine prospect to the old Exhibition Building, the RNA showgrounds and lower Victoria Park. The living quarters of the east pavilion are accessed from the east loggia and include a bathroom, kitchen, living room, bedroom, storage area, balcony and rear verandah entrance to Herston Road. In contrast to the restrained decoration of the public areas the living quarters has a number of decorative cornices in an Art Deco style.

Some mature trees from the original landscaped setting remain around the former Clubhouse. A chain wire fence on a tuff base sits on the retaining wall to the rear. Housings in the tuff base suggest that this was formally a timber fence. Concrete steps and a buggy ramp from the tram/bus stop in Herston Road provide smooth access for golfers and buggies from the roadway to the Course. Access from Course to Clubhouse is provided by a similar set of concrete steps and buggy ramp adjacent to the former first tee. A low painted stone wall with two sets of steps to the old Clubhouse forms an edge to the carpark. Approximately half way along the former first fairway a substantial set of stairs arrives on the Course from Gilchrist Avenue. The stairs are of concrete and hammered tuff with a concrete plaque bearing the date 1936.

== Heritage listing ==
The former Victoria Park Golf Clubhouse was listed on the Queensland Heritage Register on 17 December 1999 having satisfied the following criteria.

The place is important in demonstrating the evolution or pattern of Queensland's history.

The former Victoria Park Golf Clubhouse, erected in the 1930s, is important for its association with the development of golf as a popular recreational sport in Queensland. The establishment of the Victoria Park Golf Course in 1930–1931 as Brisbane's first municipal golf links, along with the formation of the Victoria Park Golf Club and the construction of a purpose-designed clubhouse, illustrates the Greater Brisbane City Council's strong commitment to the development of public recreational facilities during the interwar period.

The former Victoria Park Golf Clubhouse is an integral element within an historic precinct situated around York's Hollow and along Bowen Bridge Road between Gregory Terrace and Breakfast Creek, which has been important in the evolution of Brisbane's and Queensland's history. This area includes the residential, ecclesiastic and educational structures along Gregory Terrace overlooking Victoria Park, Bowen Park, an early tram shelter shed adjacent to Bowen Park along Bowen Bridge Road, the RNA Grounds, the former Exhibition Building (Old Museum Building) at the northeast corner of Gregory Terrace and Bowen Bridge Road, the Exhibition Railway, Victoria Park, Centenary Pool Complex, the Electricity Sub-station at the northwest corner of Bowen Bridge Road and Gregory Terrace, Victoria Park Golf Course, the former Victoria Park Golf Clubhouse, Royal Brisbane Hospital, and the University of Queensland Mayne Medical School.

The place demonstrates rare, uncommon or endangered aspects of Queensland's cultural heritage.

It is both a good example of Brisbane City Council civic architecture of the period, and a rare interwar recreational building designed and constructed by the Brisbane City Council.

The place is important in demonstrating the principal characteristics of a particular class of cultural places.

The former Victoria Park Golf Clubhouse is a substantial interwar civic building in Brisbane. It is both a good example of Brisbane City Council civic architecture of the period, and a rare interwar recreational building designed and constructed by the Brisbane City Council. In its Spanish Mission references, the building embodies the then popular association of this style – often employed in designs for picture theatres and bathing pavilions – with recreational activity. The more formal neo-Georgian 1939 extensions are mindful of its civic presence, reflecting the success of the municipal golf links as a council venture in the 1930s.

The former Victoria Park Golf Clubhouse is important in demonstrating the principal characteristics of an interwar clubhouse, accommodating the principal elements necessary to the successful functioning of a golf clubhouse of this era, including locker and associated ablutions areas for members and associates, segregated by gender; a separate entrance and lounge area for female players; an administrative station; living quarters for the club secretary; and clear physical and visual links with the golf course proper. The building retains clear evidence of the 1939 gender segregation in the arrangement of internal spaces and circulation patterns.

The place is important because of its aesthetic significance.

Despite having lost much of its park setting, the building retains an aesthetic value: the exotic suggestion of the Spanish Mission references, tempered by the neo-Georgian restraint, combine to create a robust, elegant sports pavilion.

The place has a strong or special association with a particular community or cultural group for social, cultural or spiritual reasons.

The place has social significance for its close association with the popularisation of golfing in Brisbane and in Queensland for over four decades. It also has one of the last large timber dance floors in Brisbane, and has been associated with Brisbane social functions such as balls, dinners, and receptions for many decades.
