= Victoria Park, Brisbane =

Victoria Park / Barrambin
- Barrambin (Yagara)
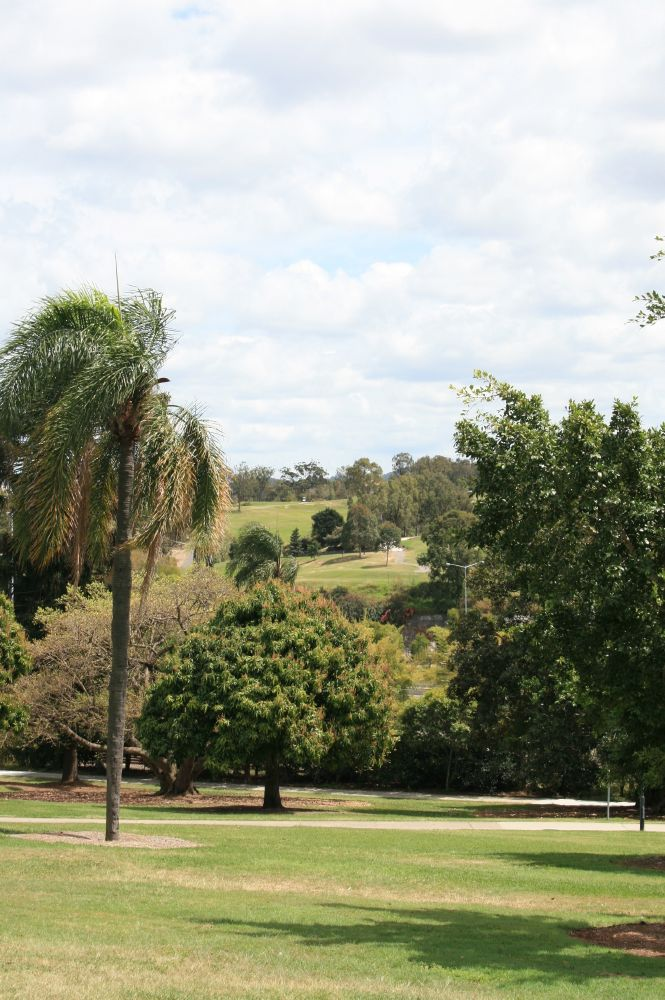
- Victoria Park / Barrambin in 2008

- Location within Queensland Location within Australia
- 27.4546°S 153.0248°E
- Location: Spring Hill and Herston, Brisbane, Queensland, Australia

History
- Settlement: 1840s

Site notes
- Owner: Brisbane City Council

Queensland Heritage Register
- Type: State heritage (built, landscape)
- Designated: 3 December 2007
- Reference no.: 602493
- Significant period: 1870s (fabric); 1870s–ongoing (historical use)

Victoria Park, also known by its Turrbal name of Barrambin, is a heritage-listed park located in Spring Hill and Herston in Brisbane, Australia. It was added to the Queensland Heritage Register on 3 December 2007. The site was formerly a public golf course that opened in November 1931, before it was converted back into a public park in June 2021 as part of ongoing urban renewal. In March 2025, it was announced that a 63,000-seat stadium will be constructed at Victoria Park / Barrambin for the 2032 Summer Olympics. The stadium will host the opening and closing ceremonies, as well as the track, field and athletics events.

Prior to colonisation, Victoria Park / Barrambin was a traditional meeting place of local groups and the site of cultural gatherings with approximately 400 people residing on the land. A British settlement was formed on part of the land in the 1840s, named York's Hollow, which was initially co-existent with Aboriginal camps before it gradually grew and displaced the local Turrbal groups. Several killings of Aboriginal people and burning of camps also occurred throughout the 1850s and 1860s, as well as individual killings of Aboriginal Elders.

== Indigenous history ==
Victoria Park is also known as Barrambin, which means "the windy place" in the traditional language of the Turrbal peoples. The area of Victoria Park closest to the site of the Royal Brisbane and Women's Hospital and the Mayne Railway Yard at Bowen Hills was likely known more specifically as "Walan". It was traditionally a meeting and gathering place for Indigenous groups travelling through the area, as well as a cultural site for corroboree, dance, hunting and fishing. Traditional spearing challenges between Indigenous families would also be held at the site, near the RNA showgrounds, which attracted white spectators after settlement of the surrounding areas.

At the time of British settlement, the number of Aboriginal Australians living at Barrambin was significantly more than the number of settlers. Dr Ray Kerkhove of the University of Queensland described the sharing of resources between Indigenous camps and the York's Hollow settlement on the site. During this period however, there were two significant attacks against Aboriginal groups by colonial police and the British Army, as well as several killings of Aboriginal leaders and Elders.

From the time of settlement through to as late as the 1910s, some settlers would allow Aboriginal people to camp on land despite the colonial government not designating any land in the Brisbane region for use by Aboriginal groups.

There were a large number of creeks that snaked through Barrambin, serving as de facto borders between Aboriginal families camping on the site. British settlement resulted in Aboriginal people being chased off land by police and having to cross these borders. Areas across from borders were recalled as places where communities could live and hunt without being attacked or molested by colonial forces. It has been proposed that due to Aboriginal traditions, new settlers that would cross these borders without seeking permission were often assaulted and robbed.

By the 1860s, most Aboriginal people had been either been removed from, or had left, Barrambin.

In 2009, Brisbane City Council and Turrbal traditional owners agreed to add the traditional name of Barrambin as a dual name for Victoria Park, and in 2020, the Council announced plans to build an Indigenous cultural learning centre on the land.

== History ==
Victoria Park covers an area of 64 hectares of undulating land in Brisbane city, in the suburb of Herston and Bowen Hills. Named for the reigning British monarch at the time, Queen Victoria, the park was gazetted in 1875.

Victoria Park provides recreational facilities such as cricket pitches, swimming pool and golf course (redesigned with a new clubhouse in 1974). It also provides much needed parking facilities during the annual Brisbane Exhibition (Ekka) held in the adjacent Brisbane Exhibition Ground.

=== Settlement and colonisation in the mid-1800s ===
Herston was first colonised by Europeans in 1859, although the area was being utilised from as early as the 1820s for major industrial activities such as brick-making and timber getting. This resulted in the denuding of the land, the sullying of the water, and dispossession of the local Aboriginal people, the Turrbal peoples. Victoria Park initially spanned an area of 130 hectares, however colonial development of the adjacent suburbs of Herston, Bowen Hills and Spring Hill grew into the park over the following years. Housing developments, schools, hospitals, golf courses and show grounds were permitted to be built on the park land.

During the early colonial period, British settlers named the site "York's Hollow" referencing the colonial name given to the local Turrbal Elder, "Duke of York". During the 1840s up to 400 Aboriginal people of the Turrbal group would reside around the waterholes at York's Hollow.

In 1846, police led by Constable Peter Murphy dispersed a major Aboriginal campsite, killing at least 3 people and burning camps.

In 1849, a detachment of the British Army's 11th Regiment conducted another burning, also wounding several Aboriginal people.

By the 1860s, most Aboriginal people were either removed from or had left the site.

During the mid 1800s, Brisbane was faced with an influx of immigrants due to the New South Wales Government's immigration schemes. As a result, areas of York's Hollow (the name prior to Victoria Park) provided a settling point for various immigrant camps. York's Hollow was also utilised as a site for brick manufacturing. The arrival of John Dunmore Lang's pioneering emigrant ship Fortitude in Brisbane in early 1849 is recognised as one of the landmark events of Queensland's history, and York's Hollow on the edge of the new township was put to good use for their accommodation. According to the Moreton Bay Courier, 253 immigrants were permitted "to form a temporary village on some of the slopes running parallel to the chains and waterholes in the neighbourhood of York's Hollow". During this time 'York's Hollow' included the area to the east of the park that is now the Brisbane Showgrounds in Bowen Hills. Many recent immigrants to Queensland in the mid-1800s stayed in these temporary camps. As Herston and the surrounding area became a popular urban development, these camps were deemed unhealthy and its residents "moved along". Several beautification projects of Victoria Park were undertaken during the late nineteenth century. This included planting avenues of trees.

When Queensland separated from New South Wales in 1859, the Queensland Government made a concerted effort to provide recreational lands for the people of Brisbane, then and for the future. It was believed that the fledgling society would benefit from having open spaces included in the infrastructure. At a time when industry was choking many of the large cities in Britain and Europe, the Queensland Government did not want the same fate to befall Brisbane. Terms such as "lungs of the city" and "breathing space" were used to describe established parks in Brisbane. A Board of Trustees was created at this time to manage Victoria Park; they "expeditiously drew up a code of by-laws which provided, not only for the protection and good government of the park, but also laid down the rules for raising revenue for the improvement of the park". This revenue raising included leasing arrangements for the park.

=== Late 1800s ===
Victoria Park borders Spring Hill on the Gregory Terrace side at the south end of the park. This area is one of the oldest suburbs in Brisbane, and Victoria Park was seen as part of this suburb. Spring Hill was home to a cross section of Brisbane society, from the very poorest living in small cottages in the lower slopes of the hill, to the prestigious and wealthy homes overlooking Victoria Park on Gregory Terrace. By the end of the nineteenth century Spring Hill was the most populated suburb in Brisbane. Victoria Park provided an open space for residents of Spring Hill, some of whom lived in crowded and poor conditions at the bottom of the hill. In the period 1870 to 1900, Victoria Park was the largest open reserve within the immediate city area.

In 1877 the Queensland Rifle Association constructed a rifle range in the north-east corner of Victoria Park. This was used both recreationally and for military and police training purposes; the range was used until 1883, when it was closed. The military, however, maintained a presence in Victoria Park, even though it was designated a "public park for recreation, convenience, health and amusement of the inhabitants of the City of Brisbane".

The importance of an extensive railway system throughout Brisbane and the surrounding areas contributed to Queensland's successful development. Victoria Park played a part in this development with a line from Roma Street railway station to Sandgate being constructed through the park in 1882. The line was routed around the outskirts of the inner-city and through Victoria Park to minimise costs. This divided the park into two sections. After the railway was run through the middle of the park (1882), the park was further reduced with the building of The Hospital for Sick Children in 1883. The children's hospital was built on the Herston side of the park as the hill rose to the north. The park's land was reduced over time by the provision of sporting facilities at the south west of the park for Brisbane Grammar School, Brisbane Girls' Grammar School and St Joseph's College, Gregory Terrace. At the start of the 1900s a site in the north-west of the park was considered for a new Government House; however Fernberg in Rosalie was leased for that purpose and later purchased in 1910.

=== 1900s ===
==== Early 1900s ====
In 1913, Victoria Park played host to a globally significant scientific experiment carried out by the Department of Terrestrial Magnetism of the Carnegie Institution of Washington. The purpose of the experiment was to study the earth's magnetism, and the magnetic variation from "true" north and "magnetic" north so as to eventually gain accurate bearings. The Institute placed small stations in various locations over the earth. The Victoria Park station (a small tent) was placed on the slope below the former Children's Hospital and on the northern side of the existing busway corridor. A sandstone block denoting the exact place where the station was placed was recovered in an archaeological dig carried out in 2001. It was inscribed C.I.W. 1913.

The Brisbane City Council (BCC) Substation No. 4 to the Bowen Bridge end of Victoria Park was designed in 1928 during a period of expansion in Brisbane. The building was designed by City Architect, Alfred Herbert Foster, and may be the earliest surviving unaltered substation designed by him. BCC substations were supplied with bulk energy from BCC power stations and converted it for use by consumers. The introduction of electricity to Brisbane was a slow and complex process. The first public supply of electricity was from the Barton and White generator in Edison Lane to the General Post Office in 1888. The situation was confused by the fact that within the Brisbane metropolitan area there were fourteen separate local authorities and numerous suppliers. Between 1904 and 1925 a number of rationalisations helped reduce this complexity and with the establishment in 1925 of the Brisbane City Council a single public authority was created which could plan for the provision of electrical services throughout the entire city. From 1925 there was a rapid expansion in the provision of infrastructure by the BCC for the delivery of electricity throughout Brisbane.

The park was again reduced by the construction of Victoria Park Golf Club. In the 1920s, municipal golf courses were being established throughout Australia and in 1922 the Queensland Golf Association proposed to the Lord Mayor of Brisbane, William Alfred Jolly, that a municipal golf course be established in Victoria Park. In 1926 the proposal was accepted. The opportunity came after the section of Victoria Park, reserved as the intended site for the University of Queensland, was no longer required after the university acquired their St Lucia site from a generous donation of £63,000 to resume over 200 acres (81 ha) by James and Emelia Mayne. The eighteen hole golf course was laid out by the surveyor Stan Francis, who was an ardent golfer. It was constructed during the Depression by men employed in the Intermittent Relief Scheme . The Victoria Park Golf Course was opened in 1931. The first Victoria Park Golf Clubhouse was designed in the Spanish Mission style by Alfred Herbert Foster and was built in 1931; it is now listed on the Queensland Heritage Register.

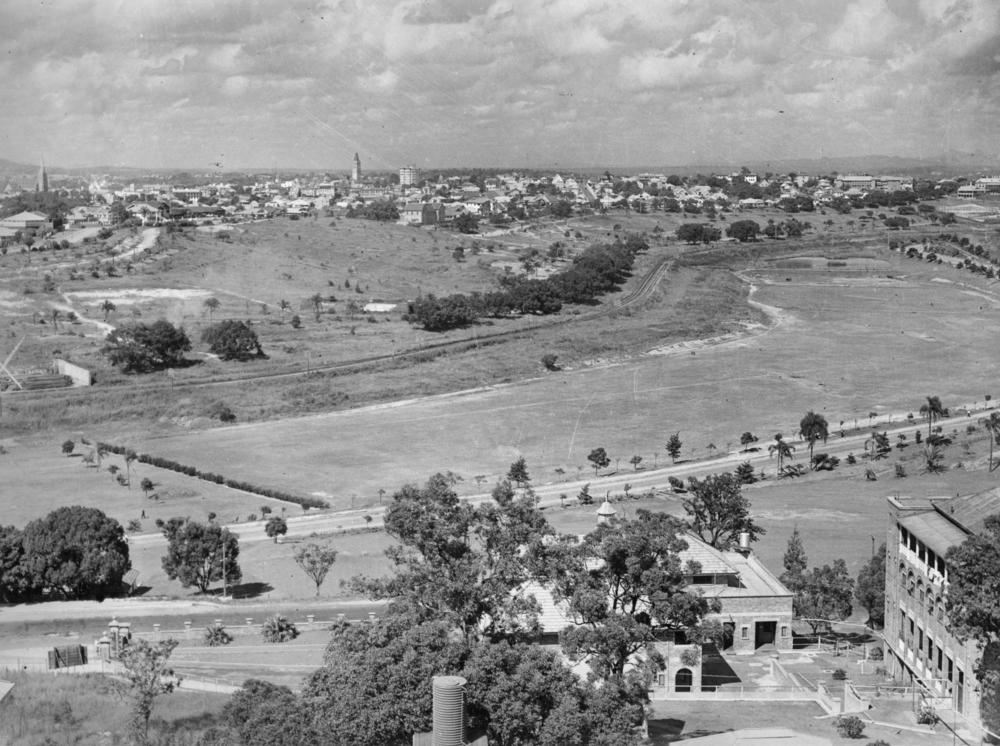
View from Herston to Brisbane CBD across Victoria Park, looking south, circa 1936

Other work was undertaken during the Depression for unemployed persons including landscaping and reclamation, notably Gilchrist Avenue constructed in 1931. The Avenue caused some adjustment of the site of the golf course. It was lined with Silky Oak and Poinciana trees as part of the beautification of the park at this time. Drainage in the lower part of the park was improved to control flooding and an existing lake developed as an ornamental feature of the park. In 1936, the entrance at the corner of Bowen Bridge Road and Gregory Terrace was improved with stone piers constructed of Brisbane Tuff.

==== World War II and afterwards ====
During the Second World War, a number of fibrolite military buildings were constructed at various points in Victoria Park by the forces of the United States of America. Following the outbreak of war in the Pacific in late 1941, Brisbane was transformed into a locale of intense military activity with thousands of American troops stationed there before being shipped off to fight the Japanese forces in the Pacific. While most of the accommodation was canvas tents, a number of huts of fibrolite on timber stumps were constructed south of Herston Road and Gregory Terrace. After the war until 1947 many of these huts were used to house Australian war brides (Australian women who had married American servicemen). After these women married an American they became stateless, losing their Australian citizenship but unable to acquire U. S. citizenship or legal rights as several years of residence in the U.S.A was required. This left many women in a very difficult position.

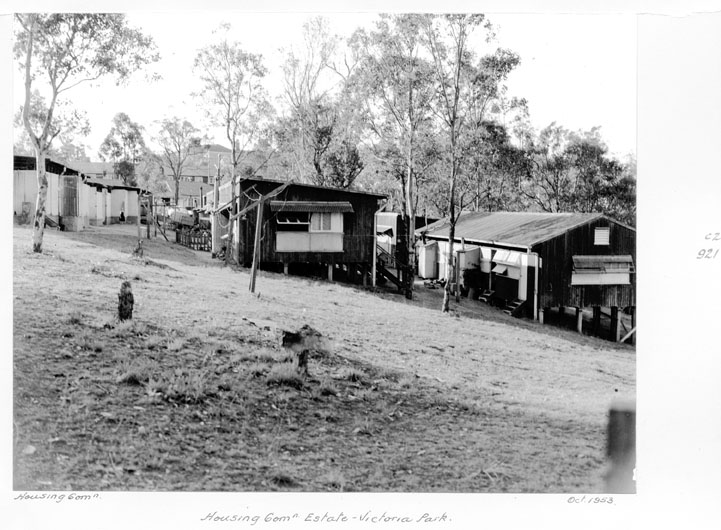
Housing Commission Estate, Victoria Park, October 1953

The post-war reconstruction process heralded an era of rapid population growth in Queensland, leading to an acute shortage in housing.

In 1946, there was pressure on the Queensland Government to take over the site but no decision was made so families took it upon themselves to occupy with vacant huts on the site. In February 1947, after a phone call from the Prime Minister to the Queensland Premier offering the site, the Queensland Government eventually agreed to take the site and have the Queensland Housing Commission convert to for accommodation.

Temporary housing became a necessity. The Queensland State Housing Commission made use of the military facilities in Victoria Park; it became the second largest temporary housing settlement in Brisbane. Each hut would house several families. By 1950 Victoria Park was the impermanent home for 460 families (usually for not more than three years). It is believed that up to 100,000 Queenslanders lived in temporary housing between 1946 and 1960 (by the Housing Commission 1947 to 1960); this demonstrates the importance of this period in Victoria Park's history, as well as to Queensland's social history. The temporary housing camps in Victoria Park were closed in 1960. The University of Queensland purchased several of the fibrolite military buildings immediately after the war. These were then used by the School of Medicine to house the anatomy and physiotherapy departments prior to their permanent move to St. Lucia in 1961 and 1972. The Queensland Institute of Medical Research also purchased a military building. These buildings were all vacated by 1977, and subsequently demolished.

In the 1950s, an extensive flowering tree planting program was initiated for the slopes and gullies of the golf course; poincianas, oleanders, jacarandas and flame trees were planted to line the fair ways. Harry Oakman, the Superintendent of Parks and Gardens was the prominent landscape architect on this project.

Harry Oakman was one of the pioneers of landscape architecture in Australia. In 1945 he began a seventeen-year appointment with the Brisbane City Council as Superintendent of Parks and Gardens and became the Director of Separate Parks Branch. He was in charge of transforming many of Brisbane's parks that had been damaged by the military use during the Second World War, including Victoria Park. Oakman was recognised as a Fellow of the British and Australian Institutes of Landscale Architects and the Royal Australian Institute of Parks and Recreation.

==== The Centenary of Queensland ====
In 1959, Queensland celebrated its Centenary (100 years since Queensland was declared a separate colony (State) from New South Wales with its own local government). Victoria Park played a large role in these celebrations in Brisbane. The Centenary Pool Complex was constructed in this year by the Brisbane City Council as its principal contribution. The pool was placed at the south-east corner of Victoria Park bordering Gregory Terrace. The complex was designed to fit into the slope of the hill overlooking Victoria Park and was designed by Brisbane City Architect James Birrell. The initial design of the complex included a landscaped entrance road designed by Oakman.

Another commemorative gesture was made within Victoria Park with the planting of 1000 eucalypt trees in the south east of the park. Named "The Gundoo Memorial Grove", this large area of planting was accomplished by the students of The Brisbane Girls' Grammar School as their contribution to the celebrations. The trees were provided by the Forestry Department and were nine varieties of eucalypt trees. This area of Victoria Park was in need of beautification as it had previously been the site of some of the Housing Commission buildings, recently demolished. In a memorandum from Harry Oakman he stated "that tree planting along forest lines in this parkland would give a unique feature to the city of Brisbane, particularly if the trees chosen are Eucalypts". He believed that the grove of eucalypts would have advantages such as low cost and little maintenance whilst still being attractive and shade giving.

==== Middle and late 1900s ====
In 1968, the Department of Electricity acquired land in the south east of the park and built an office building behind the Substation. They also purchased a large stores building previously used by the Queensland Railway Department in the same corner of the park.

In 1988, the lake area in Victoria Park was officially named 'York's Hollow'.

=== 2000 and onwards ===
The Inner City Bypass was completed in 2003. It provides a direct link from Kingsford-Smith Drive at Hamilton through to Hale Street in Paddington and from there onto the South East Freeway. The bypass sits parallel to the railway that runs through Victoria Park. It is another example of the encroachment of Victoria Park's land. The bypass was undertaken to reduce traffic congestion in the Brisbane central business district and Fortitude Valley.

==== Redevelopment plans ====
In December 2020, Council released Victoria Park Vision for the parklands. Community engagement for the Victoria Park Vision included over 2,000 submissions, and identified a number of key themes including environmental restoration, Aboriginal engagement and co-design, delivering small-scale experiences, diverse types of parkland spaces, safety and accessibility, access to transport options, and collaboration with local residents. As part of this process, the Brisbane City Council confirmed that a new visitor and Aboriginal cultural learning centre would be built.,

In 2022, Council held community consultation on the Victoria Park / Barrambin Draft Master Plan, a comprehensive proposal to redevelop Victoria Park into a community parkland following the Victoria Park Vision. The Draft Master Plan includes community feedback from over 51,000 submissions, and includes the development of new infrastructure as well as the site of a new BMX track for the Brisbane 2032 Summer Olympics.

In February 2024, former South Bank chair Steve Wilson and his wife, Jane, advocated for the construction of a new 50,000 seat stadium in Victoria Park, which would host the opening and closing ceremonies of the 2032 Olympics, as well as the cricket and AFL. The proposal was rejected by the then-premier of Queensland, Steven Miles, as well as the lord mayor of Brisbane, Adrian Schrinner.

In March 2024, a 60-day review of Olympic infrastructure led by former lord mayor of Brisbane, Graham Quirk, recommended that plans to redevelop the Gabba be scrapped, and a 55,000 seat stadium be constructed on a site in Victoria Park. The new stadium was estimated to cost approximately $3.4 billion, compared to $3 billion to redevelop the Gabba. However, the plan was quickly dismissed by the Miles government, who instead committed to upgrade Lang Park, which would host the Games ceremonies, and QSAC, which would host the athletics events. Despite this, Miles accepted 27 of the report’s 30 recommendations.

On 21 March, four days after the release of the infrastructure review, then-Queensland opposition leader, David Crisafulli, publicly rejected Quirk’s recommendation to build a stadium in Victoria Park, and pledged not to construct any new stadiums if elected later that year. Instead, he committed to appoint an independent infrastructure authority that would be required to report back within 100 days on the best path forward.

Following his election as premier in October 2024, David Crisafulli commissioned a 100-day review into Olympic infrastructure that would identify priorities for a main stadium. However, Crisafulli refused to be drawn on whether he would veto a recommendation for a new stadium if it arose. The review was completed in March 2025. On 25 March, Crisafulli announced that a new 63,000 seat stadium would be built on greenfield land at Victoria Park. According to the infrastructure review, the stadium will cost approximately $3.785 billion, although this figure is yet to be publicly confirmed.

The plan for a Victoria Park stadium has been a subject of contention, largely due to the fact that Aboriginal elders have voiced their opposition to the stadium's development, as Victoria Park is a sacred and culturally significant site to First Nations people in Brisbane. In support of Traditional Owners, the Goori Camp Embassy was created, marked by the establishment of a cultural fire on 5 April 2026. The gatherings at Goori Camp Embassy have included Aboriginal ceremonies and cultural fires, which the organisers say is part of maintaining living cultural heritage under the Aboriginal and Torres Strait Islander Heritage Protection Act. The development of a Victoria Park stadium has been subject to at least ten legal challenges under Section 10 of Australia's Aboriginal and Torres Strait Islander Heritage Protection Act, two of which were rejected by the environment minister, Murray Watt, in May 2026.

== Description ==
Victoria Park occupies undulating land which generally falls steeply from the ridge at Gregory Terrace down to the railway line, across the railway line, north to Gilchrist Avenue. The ridge offers expansive views across to the Old Museum, RNA Showgrounds (Brisbane Exhibition Ground), Royal Brisbane Hospital, University of Queensland Mayne Medical School, Victoria Park Golf Course, Red Hill, Mt Coot-tha and across to the Brisbane CBD and beyond.

A pair of Brisbane Tuff entrance gate piers stand to Bowen Bridge Road. The tall stepped and tapered Brisbane Tuff piers have dressed stone bases and dado panels with quarry-faced stone corners. Decorative metal lamp holders crown the piers.

The Park has large open grassed areas and is planted with mature figs, eucalypts, shade trees, ornamental trees, palms and planted beds. The Gundoo Memorial Grove of eucalypts stands to the south east end of the park.

A freestanding, single-storey red face and rendered brick pavilion, former BCC Substation No. 4 stands to the corner of Gregory Terrace and Bowen Bridge Road opposite the Old Museum. The Substation addresses the corner at an angle to Bowen Bridge Road complementing that of the more prominent Old Museum to the northeast across Bowen Bridge Road.

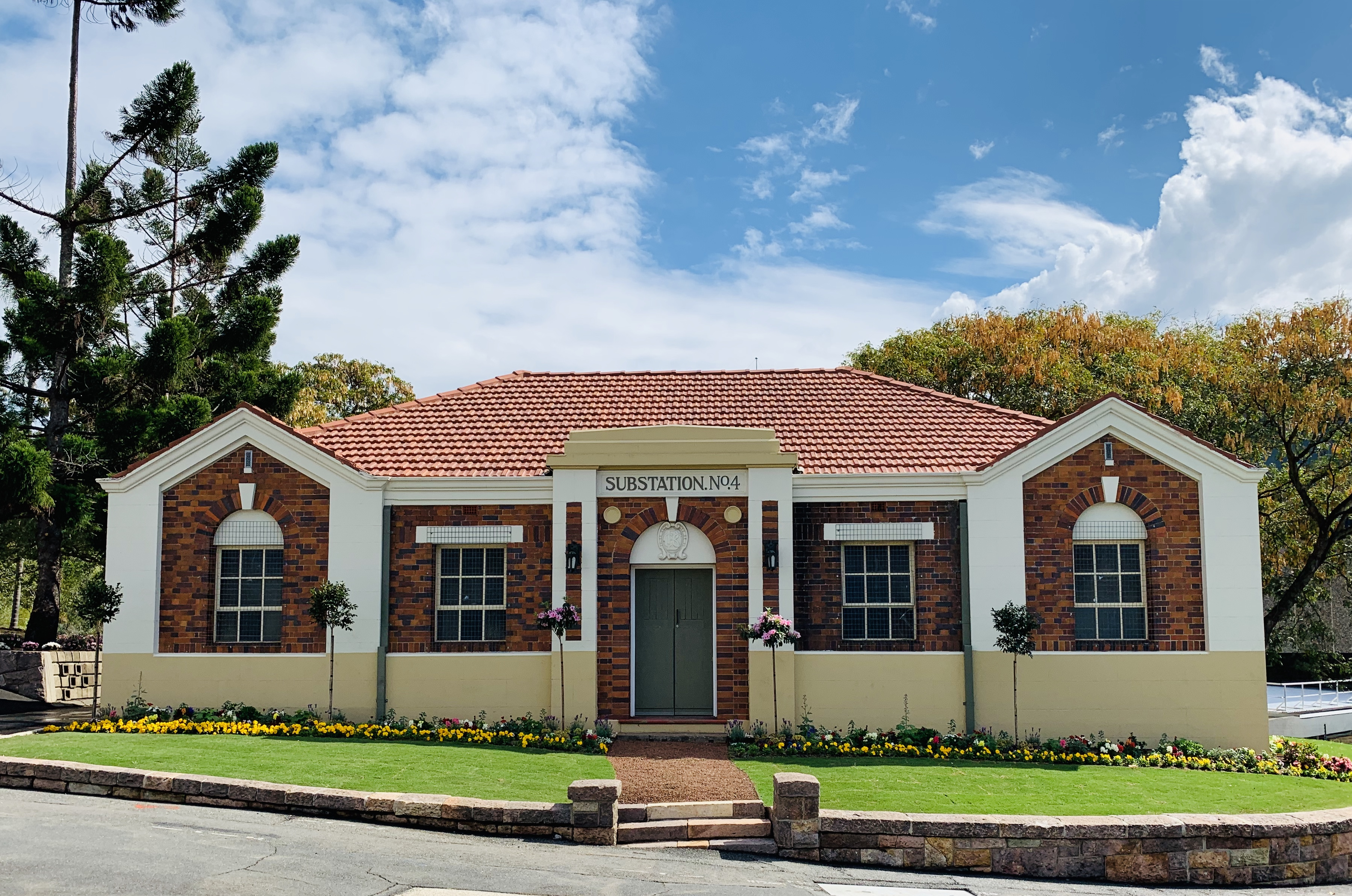
Substation, 2019

The Substation building is rectangular in plan with a timber-framed tiled hip roof behind a rendered brick parapet with a moulded cornice. The elevations are characterised by arch openings, accented keystones and rendered lintels. The front elevation is symmetrical about a projecting central entrance porch in which a decorative crest bearing the lettering BCC sits within an arched doorway. The front elevation end bays are capped by gable fronts to the parapet. The side elevations have parapets with a central gable front. A number of small metal plaques are embedded in the lower part of the front elevation, to the riser of the front concrete stair and to the front stone fence.

A random course quarry-face ashlar wall of Brisbane Tuff runs to the front of the Substation from the Gregory Terrace corner and around into Bowen Bridge Road terminating in a tall capped pier. A small flight of stone stairs flanked by low piers within the wall defines an entrance from Bowen Bridge Road.

The railway and inner-city bypass run directly through the park from the south west to the north east and divide the two sections of the park. This division is approximately 150 metres (490 ft) in width throughout the park. The northern section of the park contains several sheltered barbeque and picnic areas amid large expanses of lawn and playing fields. Gilchrist Avenue has been made a cul-de-sac. A wooden and steel footbridge has been constructed over the lake from the end of Gilchrist Avenue over the lakes. The lake contains water-lilies and high grasses. At the east end of the lake is a bronze statue.

== Controversies ==
The March 2025 decision to build a 63,000-seat stadium in Victoria Park sparked widespread criticism from community groups, environmental advocates, and political opponents. Critics argue that the development breaks an election pledge by Premier David Crisafulli not to construct a new stadium and threatens to destroy valuable green space that has been preserved for over 160 years. They also question the suitability of building on a heritage-listed site with cultural significance to First Nations communities, as well as the estimated multibillion-dollar cost. While the government maintains that environmental and heritage requirements will be met, opponents have indicated they may pursue legal challenges. The proposal for the stadium have been met with opposition from across the political spectrum, including previous Queensland LNP premier, Campbell Newman and Greens councillor Seal Chong-Wah. The stadium plans have now been revealed and have been met with concern from Traditional owners and community groups because of the cultural and environmental importance of the site.

== Heritage listing ==
Victoria Park was entered in the Queensland Heritage Register on 3 December 2007. Additional land was added to the heritage boundary on 10 December 2021 and a much larger area of land was added on 5 September 2025. As of 2025, the place satisfies the following criteria:

- The place is important in demonstrating the evolution or pattern of Queensland's history.
  Victoria Park, a place that has been formed by a range of uses over time, is important in demonstrating the establishment and evolution of Queensland’s early public recreation reserves. Established at a site of cultural importance for Aboriginal people across the region, Victoria Park was granted to the Brisbane Municipal Council for use as a public park in 1864 and was formally gazetted as a recreation reserve in 1875, during the early period of the establishment of such reserves in Queensland. It has remained a large public park, used for sport and recreation, on the fringe of the state capital’s CBD. Its green spaces, mature trees, and sports facilities have been maintained and improved over time. The park has been enhanced by ornamental and memorial features, including plantings, Gilchrist Avenue, stone walls, planter beds, and a lake. The park contains examples of the work of professional horticulturalists Henry Moore (Brisbane Parks Superintendent 1912-40) and Harry Oakman (Brisbane Parks Superintendent 1946-63), including mature tree plantings, planter beds, and the Gundoo Memorial Grove plantings of native trees in 1959 to celebrate the centenary of Queensland, and remnants of the adjacent subtropical plantings in the early 1960s. Victoria Park is also regionally important and distinctive for its long history of non-park uses, including: its role as social, cultural, and sustenance grounds for Aboriginal people; resource extraction, such as timber felling and industrial brick-making (until the 1860s); stock agistment (from 1860s); temporary housing and camps for displaced people, including early immigrants (1840s), the unemployed during the Great Depression (1930s), war brides (1945-7), and families awaiting Housing Commission residences (1947–60); the provision of municipal services, such as official rubbish dumping (1870s to 1901), and an electricity substation (1928); and defence uses, including a rifle range (1860s-80s), and military camps, air raid shelters, and an anti-aircraft battery during World War II (WWII) (1942-5). The park retains physical evidence of its varied and evolving uses – some have left visible legacies, in built and landscape form, while others have contributed to the archaeological potential of the site.
- The place has potential to yield information that will contribute to an understanding of Queensland’s history.
  Victoria Park has the potential to contribute knowledge that will lead to a greater understanding of Queensland’s early and evolved urban material culture, consumption and disposal habits, utilities infrastructure, and occupation activities on the urban fringe. Archaeological investigations of the extensive late-19th and early-20th century municipal refuse deposits have the potential to reveal artefacts that may provide further information on the lifestyles, diet, and health of urban colonial occupants, and facilitate studies of market access, consumer choice, refuse disposal patterns, and social and economic life. The progressive disposal of refuse across the park also provides an opportunity to explore changes in material culture over time. Archaeological investigations of areas subject to late-19th and early-20th century reclamation and drainage improvements, and in the vicinity of the interwar Brisbane City Council (BCC) Electricity Substation No. 4, have the potential to reveal surface and sub-surface features that could contribute to a greater understanding of the planning, design, and construction of drainage and electrical distribution infrastructure. Historical use of the park for a variety of purposes has resulted in the potential for rare subsurface archaeological evidence that could inform about the nature and extent of early- to mid-19th century meeting, camping, rifle range, and brick-making activities in the historically low-lying ‘York’s Hollow’ area, and occupation of the place during the Great Depression and WWII.
- The place is important in demonstrating the principal characteristics of a particular class of cultural places.
  BCC Electricity Substation No. 4 (1928), located in the northeast corner of Victoria Park, is an excellent example of an electricity substation constructed during the interwar period in Brisbane. Highly intact in its form, fabric, and materials, it is important in demonstrating the principal characteristics of its type, which include its: inner urban location; domestic scale and form with modest Classical influences; masonry construction with red-brown face brick walls and render details; parapet to the main entrance; use of robust materials with simple detailing; large operable windows for abundant interior ventilation and roller doors to permit large machinery; and open, robust interior with concrete floor, designed to accommodate electrical equipment.
- The place is important because of its aesthetic significance.
  Victoria Park is significant for its aesthetic attributes, as an extensive, well-kept green space juxtaposed within a metropolitan context. Its undulating terrain has expanses of lawn, sports fields, and mature tree plantings, and affords picturesque views from the park out into its urban surrounds. This is particularly impressive from two high points, affording broad views centred on the Brisbane CBD’s high rise towers. Highly intact, BCC Electricity Substation No. 4 has aesthetic importance for its beautiful attributes and streetscape contribution through its form, scale, materials, skilful use of modest Classically-influenced Interwar architectural style, and prominent location fronting Gregory Terrace and Bowen Bridge Road. The building is an attractive, well-considered design with symmetrical composition, central parapet and projecting end gables, and complementary material palette of red-brown face brick, terracotta roof tiles, and render details.
- The place has a strong or special association with a particular community or cultural group for social, cultural or spiritual reasons.
  Victoria Park has a long and special association with the people of Brisbane as an inner-city park for organised and informal sport and recreation, officially since its formal gazettal as a recreation reserve in 1875.
