= Herston, Queensland =

Herston
- Suburb
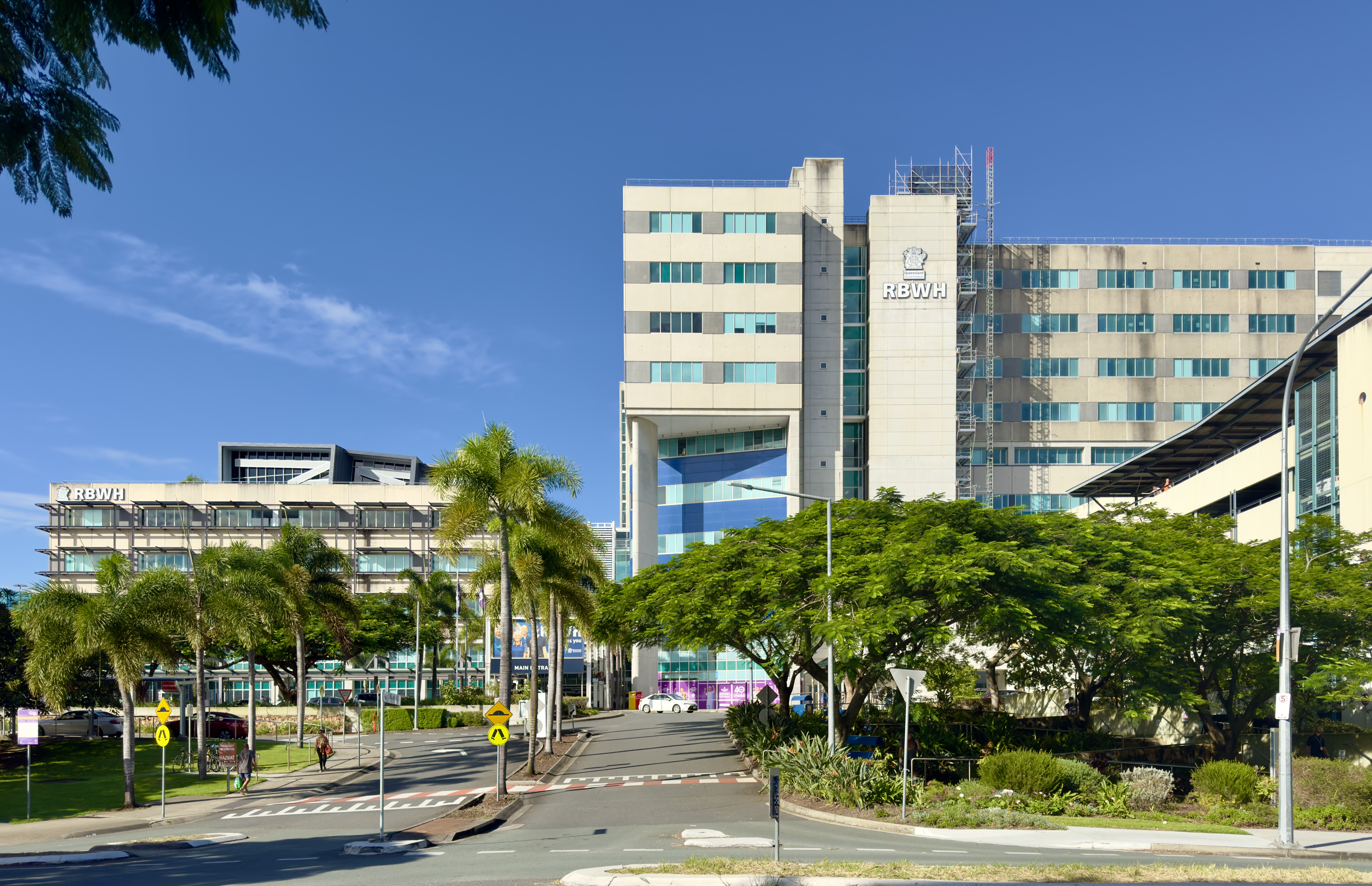
- Royal Brisbane and Women's Hospital

- Interactive map of Herston
- Coordinates: 27.4505°S 153.0211°E
- Country: Australia
- State: Queensland
- City: Brisbane
- LGA: City of Brisbane (Central Ward)
- Location: 5.2 km (3.2 mi) N of Brisbane CBD

Government
  - State electorate: McConnel
  - Federal division: Brisbane

Area
  - Total: 1.6 km^{2} (0.62 sq mi)

Population
  - Total: 2,311 (2021 census)
  - Density: 1,440/km^{2} (3,740/sq mi)
- Time zone: UTC+10:00 (AEST)
- Postcode: 4006
Suburbs around Herston
Wilston	Windsor	Windsor
Kelvin Grove	Herston	Bowen Hills
Kelvin Grove	Spring Hill	Spring Hill

Herston is an inner suburb of the City of Brisbane, Queensland, Australia. In the 2021 census, Herston had a population of 2,311 people.

== Geography ==
Herston is located 2.9 kilometres (1.8 mi) by car north of the Brisbane CBD.

The area of Herston includes the Herston Health Precinct on its eastern side. This includes the Royal Brisbane and Women's Hospital, the Queensland Institute of Medical Research and the Herston Quarter which is a development site to replace the former Royal Children's Hospital which moved to another site in 2014. Herston also includes the Ballymore Stadium Rugby Union venue in the northwest and Victoria Park on the southern side of Herston Road. The park includes the Victoria Park golf facilities and the heritage-listed former Victoria Park Golf Clubhouse built in 1931.

The Herston Quarter is a 5-hectare (12-acre) development site in Herston adjacent to the Royal Brisbane and Women's Hospital on the site of the former Royal Children's Hospital which was merged into the Queensland Children's Hospital in South Brisbane. The site includes the restoration of the historic Royal Brisbane Hospital Nurses' Homes.

The rest of Herston is mostly a residential suburb.

== History ==
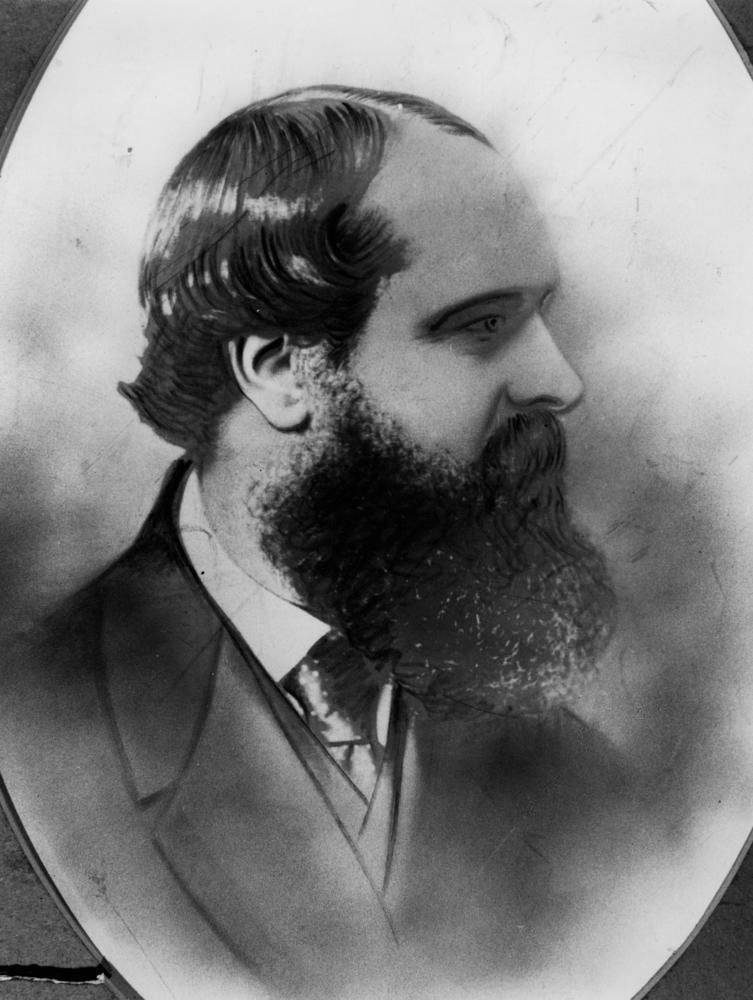
Robert Herbert

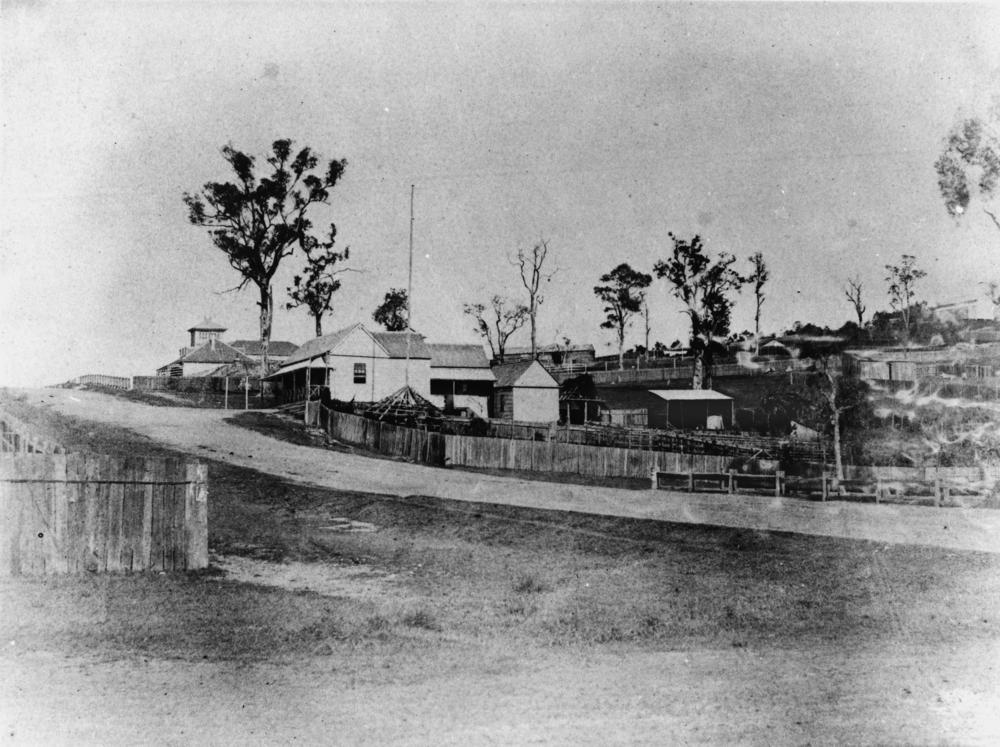
View of Bowen Bridge Road from the corner of O'Connell Terrace in 1869

Herston was first settled by Europeans in the 1850s. Sir Robert Herbert, Queensland's first premier, built a farm in the area, and lived in the farmhouse with his then Attorney-General, John Bramston. They named their house Herston, a combination of their surnames, which eventually became the name of the suburb. It has been speculated that the two men may have been in a kind of homosexual relationship at the time or at least a kind of very strong and intimate male friendship.

Many of Herston's streets were named after local identities of the time. Bowen Bridge Road and Bowen Park were named after Sir George Bowen, Queensland's first governor. Butterfield Street was named after local schoolmaster William Butterfield. Hetherington Street was named after coal industry identity John William Hetherington, and Garrick Terrace got its name from James Francis Garrick, the man who purchased Herston from Herbert and Bramston.

Royal Children's Hospital Special School opened on 11 August 1919. As the name suggests, the school provided education to children who were patients in the hospital. On 1 December 2014 it became the Royal Brisbane and ACT for Kids Campus of the Lady Cilento Children's Hospital School. On 1 January 2019 it became a campus of the Queensland Children's Hospital School (reflecting the name change of the Lady Cilento Children's Hospital).

St Joan of Arc Catholic church opened on Sunday 5 December 1920 when it was blessed and opened by Roman Catholic Archbishop of Brisbane, James Duhig. St Joan of Arc Catholic School opened on 14 July 1924 under the Sisters of the Presentation. The school closed in 1968.

From the eastern side of the suburb was served by frequent tram services along Bowen Bridge Road, with routes converging from Chermside, Kalinga (until 1962), Stafford, and Grange. These services combined to provide the suburb with an off-peak service of a tram every 2½ minutes along Bowen Bridge Road in the late 1950s. This service ceased in December 1968. From the western side of the suburb was served by trams which ran along Kelvin Grove Road. This service also ceased in December 1968.

Herston Methodist Church opened on Saturday 24 March 1923 on the corner of Aberleigh and Scott Roads (27.4468°S 153.0203°E). It was an unpretentious hardwood building 33 by 24 feet (10.1 m × 7.3 m). The church was still operating in 1990 but had closed prior to March 2020.

On 13 October 1928 St Luke's Anglican Mission Hall was dedicated by Archbishop Gerald Sharp. Although Herston was within the parish of Holy Trinity Church at Fortitude Valley, Herston residents had wanted a closer place of worship. The mission hall was in a converted residence with the front rooms being used as a chapel and a Sunday School. A new church was dedicated on 29 April 1962 by Archbishop Reginald Halse and consecrated on 18 October 1964 by Archbishop Philip Strong. Its closure on 7 May 1993 was approved by Assistant Bishop Wood. It was located on the corner of Wyndham and Weightman Streets (27.4478°S 153.0234°E).

Between 1953 and November 1968, the suburb was also served by Brisbane City Council trolley-buses which connected the suburb with Fortitude Valley and ran through to Stanley Bridge in East Brisbane. The trolley-buses ran along Herston Road and Butterfield Street, past Ballymore football ground, terminating near the intersection of Prospect Terrace and Kelvin Grove Road.

Wattlebrae Hospital School opened circa 1957 and closed circa 1958.

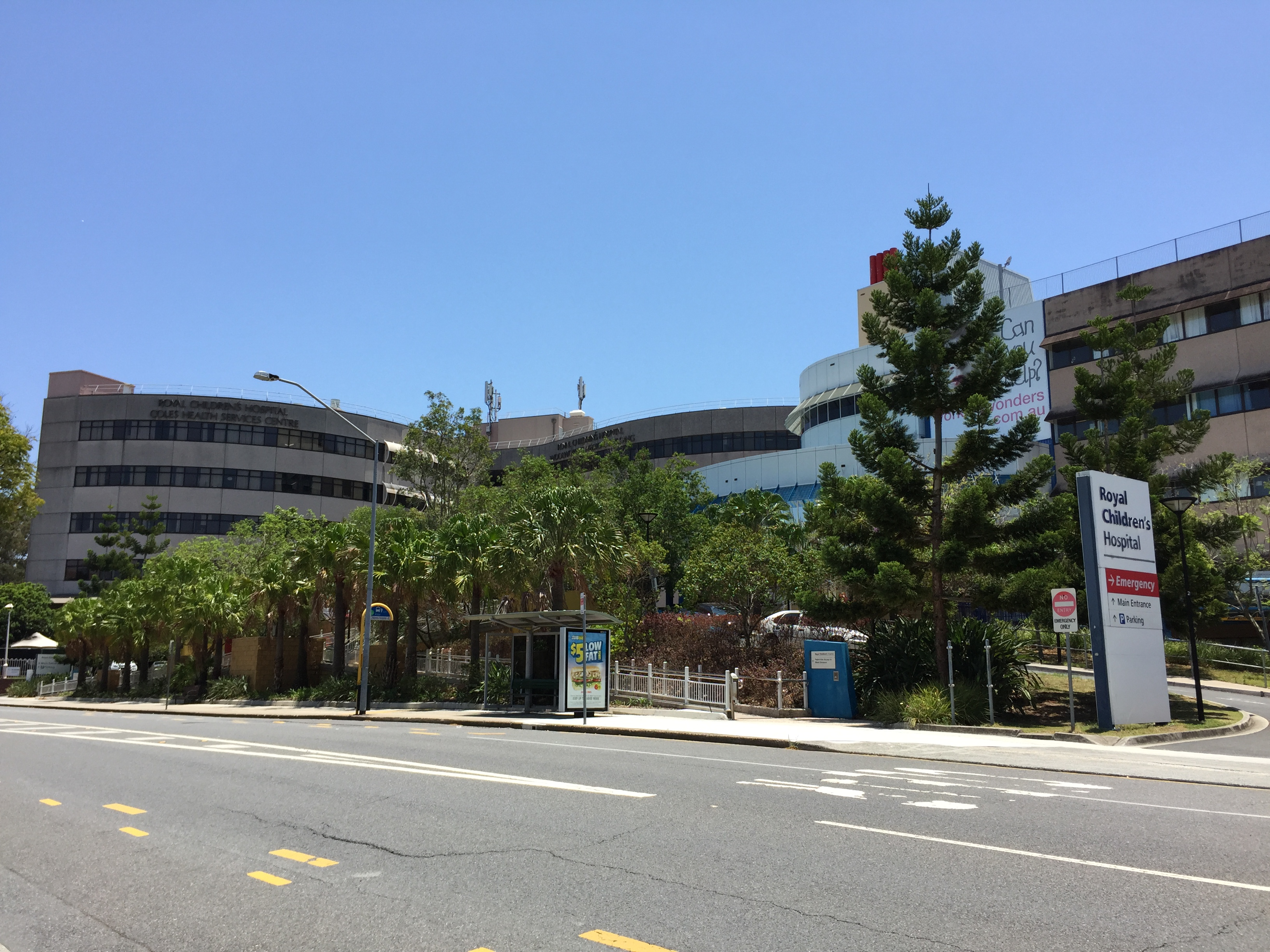
Royal Children's Hospital, Herston, November 2014

In 2009, a decision was made to merge the Royal Children's Hospital with Mater Children's Hospital in Stanley Street, South Brisbane to create a single children's hospital in Brisbane. The decision was very controversial with many people opposed to the merger, while others supported the merge but argued over location of the new hospital (some favouring the Herston site and other favouring the South Brisbane site). The Queensland Children's Hospital opened on 29 November 2014, adjacent to the Mater Misericordiae Hospital, in South Brisbane, with the Royal Children's Hospital and the Mater Children's Hospital closing immediately as their patients were transferred to the Queensland Children's Hospital.

In November 2014, the Queensland Government sought applications from developers to develop the site into a mixed-use precinct which would complement the adjacent health and educational facilities. Three lead developers were short-listed in July 2015. On 1 October 2015, the government issued a call for detailed proposals from the two remaining shortlisted parties to develop the site, Stockland having withdrawn. The remaining proponents were Frasers Property Australia with Australian Unity and Lendlease with Trinity Health. On 9 December 2015, the government announced that part of the development would include a government-funded Specialist Rehabilitation and Ambulatory Care Centre (SRACC) with 100 rehabilitation beds and 32-day surgery beds with seven operating theatres and three endoscopy rooms.

The project to redevelop the Herston Quarter site is expected to cost the Queensland Government A$1.1 billion over ten years to develop a mixed health, aged care, residential and retail precinct. On 14 August 2016, Premier of Queensland, Annastacia Palaszczuk announced that Australian Unity had won the tender for the redevelopment, and there were expected to be 700 construction jobs and 1000 ongoing jobs on the site. It was announced to include a 132-bed specialist rehabilitation and ambulatory care centre for burns, stroke and other recovering patients. Further stages will have a private hospital for day-surgery, a residential aged-care home for over 100 people, research facilities, accommodation for 250 medical students, nurses scientists and visiting experts. The development will be overseen by the Metro North Hospital and Health Service.

On 25 August 2016, HASSELL was announced as the design partner for the Herston Quarter project. Watpac was announced as the builder.

The Herston Quarter was declared a "Priority Development Area" (PDA) on 18 November 2016 by the Queensland Government under the Economic Development Act 2012. The declaration of a PDA removes the affected land from the planning and development processes of both the Sustainable Planning Act 2009 and Brisbane City Plan 2014. The PDA is managed by Economic Development Queensland within the Department of Infrastructure, Local Government and Planning. In addition, an Interim Land Use Plan was prepared to fast-track the development of a Specialist Rehabilitation and Ambulatory Care Centre. On 6 July 2017 the PDS (Proposed Development Scheme) was released for consultation.

On 6 August 2017, the State Government released development plans for the Herston Quarter project.

== Demographics ==
In the 2016 census, Herston had a population of 2,215 people. The median age of the Herston population was 29 years of age, 9 years below the Australian median. 50.4% of people were born in Australia. The next most common country of birth was China at 6.5%. 57.7% of people spoke only English at home. Other languages spoken at home included Mandarin at 7.1%.The most common responses for religion were No Religion 40.7% and Catholic 18.4%.

In the 2021 census, Herston had a population of 2,311 people.

== Heritage listings ==
Herston has a number of heritage-listed sites, including:

- Brisbane General Hospital Precinct, 40 Bowen Bridge Road
- Royal Brisbane Hospital Nurses' Homes, Herston Road
- University of Queensland Mayne Medical School, 288 Herston Road
- former Victoria Park Golf Clubhouse, 309 Herston Road

== Education ==
The Royal Brisbane and ACT for Kids Campus of the Queensland Children's Hospital School is located within the hospital precinct. However it is only for children who are in-patients of the hospitals and their family members.

There are no other schools in Herston. The nearest government primary and secondary school is the Kelvin Grove State College in neighbouring Kelvin Grove.

== Amenities ==
St Joan of Arc Catholic Church is at 47 Clyde Road (27.4452°S 153.0168°E).

== Transport ==
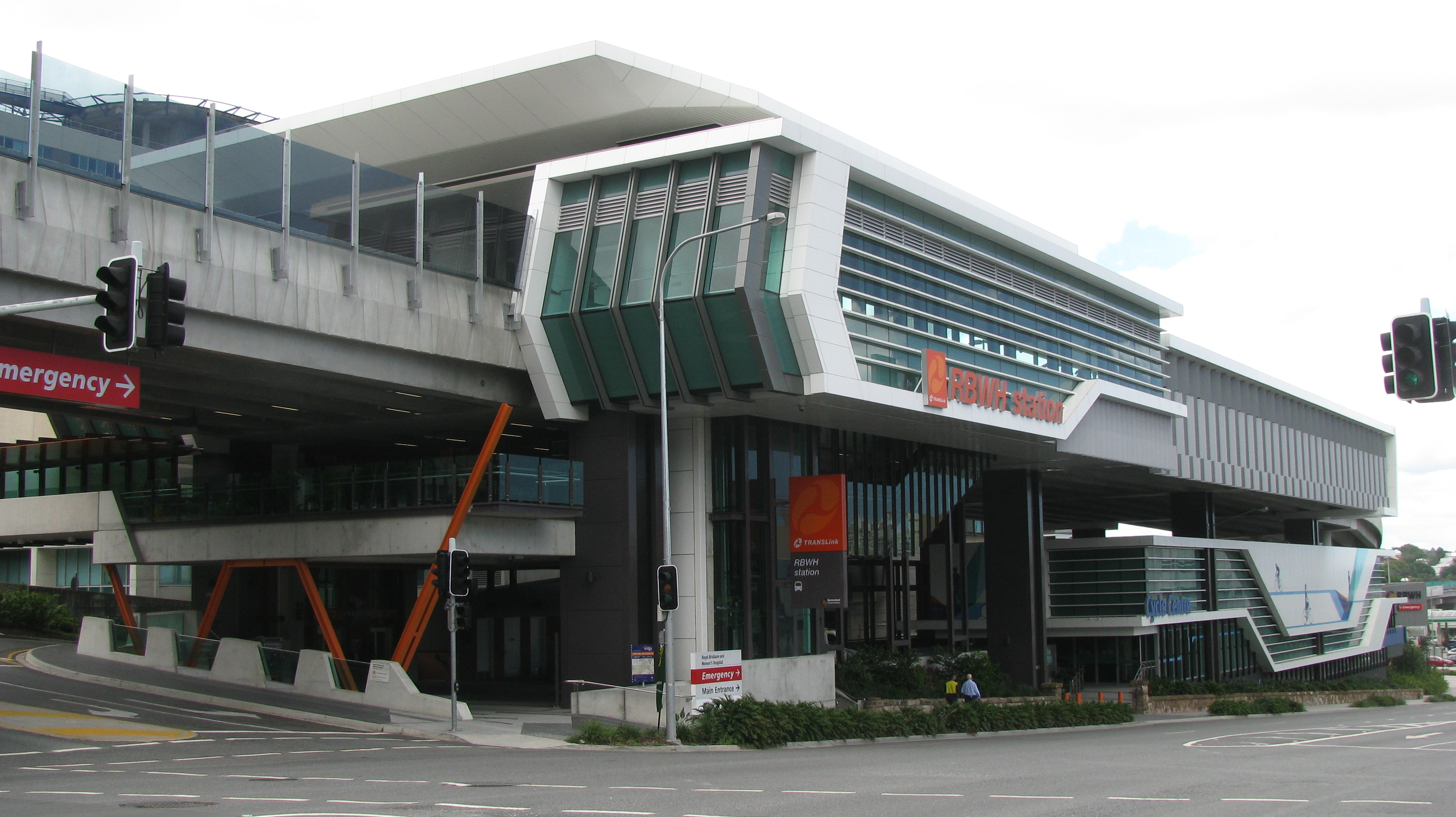
Royal Brisbane and Women's Hospital busway station

Brisbane City Council diesel buses serve the suburb, with two distinct corridors along Butterfield Street in the north and the Inner-Northern Busway in the south of the suburb. It services the Royal Brisbane and Women's Hospital busway station (which is the terminus for several routes including the Brisbane Metro M2 route), and Herston station, located across Herston Road from the hospital's rear entrance.

== Notable people ==
- Kyra Cooney-Cross (born 2002), soccer player for the Australia national team
