= Royal Brisbane Hospital Nurses' Homes =

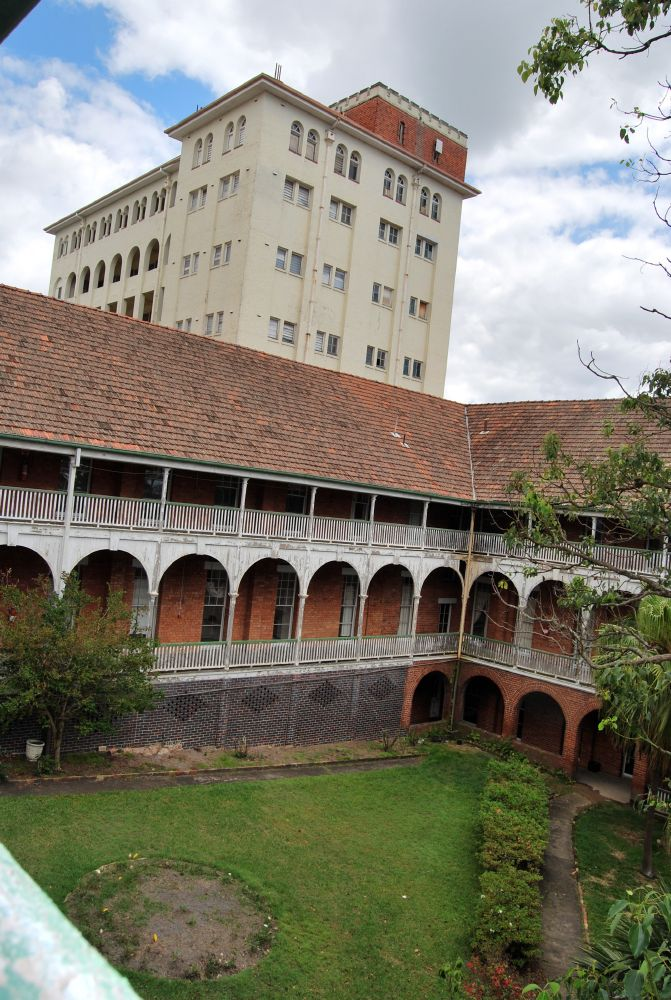
- Lady Lamington Nurses Home in foreground, high-rise Nurses' Home behind, 2008

- Location within Queensland Location within Australia
- 27.4481°S 153.0266°E
- Location: Royal Brisbane Hospital, Herston Road, Herston, City of Brisbane, Queensland, Australia

History
- Design period: 1870s–1890s (late 19th century)
- Built: 1896–1939

Site notes
- Architect(s): Robin Dods, Hall & Dods, Atkinson & Conrad
- Architectural styles: Arts and Crafts, Spanish Mission style

Queensland Heritage Register
- Official name: Nurses' Homes, Royal Brisbane Hospital (including Lady Lamington and Blocks 1 and 2), Lady Lamington Nurses' Home, Nurses' Homes Blocks 1 and 2
- Type: state heritage (built)
- Designated: 21 October 1992
- Reference no.: 600223
- Significant period: 1896, 1914, 1931, 1936, 1939 (fabric); 1890s–1980s (historical)
- Significant components: trees/plantings, courtyard, residential accommodation – nurses' quarters, garden – ornamental/flower
- Builders: George Day and J. Hutchinson & Sons (now Hutchinson Builders) for Lady Lamington Tower 1 (c. 1936)

The Royal Brisbane Hospital Nurses' Homes are heritage-listed accommodation for nurses at the Royal Brisbane Hospital, Herston Road, Herston, City of Brisbane, Queensland, Australia. It was built from 1896 to 1939. It includes the Lady Lamington Nurses' Home and Nurses' Homes Blocks 1 & 2. It was added to the Queensland Heritage Register on 21 October 1992.

== History ==
The Royal Brisbane Hospital Nurses' Homes comprises three buildings: the Lady Lamington Nurses Home erected in three stages between 1896 and 1931 and Nurses Homes Blocks 1 and 2 erected in 1936 and 1939 respectively.

The Royal Brisbane Hospital (then known as the Brisbane Hospital) was established at the Herston site in 1866. This was followed by the Hospital for Sick Children (1883) erected on an adjoining site fronting Herston Road and much later, in 1938, by the Brisbane Women's Hospital on Bowen Bridge Road. The earliest buildings of the Brisbane Hospital were gathered around the corner of Bowen Bridge and Herston Roads, with later wards and associated buildings gradually erected higher up the hill.

Pressure for improved nurses accommodation finally came to fruition when (what was to be the first stage of) the Lady Lamington Nurses Home was erected in 1896 on the crest of the hill overlooking the hospital. The L-shaped building selected by the Committee from a number of competition designs was submitted by architect Robin Dods. It included accommodation for some fifty nurses in cubicles partitioned to below ceiling height for better ventilation; a sitting room with fireplace on each floor; servants' quarters at basement level; and a two storeyed semi-detached toilet block (since demolished). Built of brick with a Marseilles tiled roof (believed to be one of the earliest uses of the material in Queensland), it was enclosed by verandahs; the semicircular steps to the court yard garden became a popular posing place for nurses photographs. Although the competition brief called for a kitchen and dining room, these were not included.

In 1914, Hall & Dods called tenders for additions forming the building into a "U" shape; the contract was let to Brisbane builder George Day, at a price of £11,889.

Lady Lamington Nurses Home (named for the wife of the then State Governor) was the first of Dods' Queensland buildings and established the practice of Hall & Dods (1896–1916), which quickly became the leading architectural firm in Queensland undertaking numerous residential, commercial, ecclesiastical, and hospital works (including the Mater Misericordia Hospital – Private (1908–10), Public (1909–11, extended 1913), Nurses Quarters and Kitchen (1913)). Other work undertaken at the Brisbane Hospital included the Superintendent's Residence (1900; removed 1970s), laundry and boiler house (1904), open air pavilion for male surgical patients (1912), Walter Russell Hall Operating Theatre (1914; now the Canteen), and Outpatients Building (1916; now Block 10) as well as Open Air Wards (1911; now workshops and storerooms) and administration building (1911; now fire and security offices) for the Metropolitan Infectious Diseases Hospital (now included as part of the RBH site).

Lady Lamington Nurses Home was to form the first part of what became the residential precinct for the Hospital site which stretched from the top of the hill down towards Bowen Bridge Road. It includes the Edith Cavell Memorial Block for Nurses (1921), Medical Officers Quarters (1934; 1939; demolished 1994), Medical Superintendent's Residence (1941; now the Social Workers Office), and two other residences (erected 1941, since demolished).

The 1920s and 1930s was a period of great expansion for the Hospital, with a major building program announced in 1925 following the introduction of the Health Act of 1923 by Ted Theodore's Labor government which saw the state government accept financial and administrative responsibility for the provision of health services in Queensland. With a dramatic increase in nursing staff in the 1930s, further accommodation was required. In 1931, architects Atkinson and Conrad in association with Lange Powell added a third wing to Lady Lamington to complete the existing "E" shape.

Soon after, in 1936, the first of the two tower blocks, Block 1, was erected; the second in 1939. Both were joined to the first and second floors of Lady Lamington. They were planned in a similar way to the earlier quarters with a central corridor flanked by small rooms opening onto verandahs. The architectural vocabulary employed was, however, very different using the contemporary Spanish Mission style favoured by Arnold Henry Conrad and at this time established as the hospital house style. Accommodation was also provided for nursing training. A small single storeyed library was built between the Blocks 1 and 2 in the 1950s. The roof on the northern block was rebuilt after being destroyed by fire in 1993.

Atkinson and Conrad (also known as Atkinson Powell and Conrad and later Conrad & Gargett) were appointed Hospital architects in the mid 1920s. They were the pre-eminent interwar architectural firm in Queensland, particularly known for their use of the Spanish mission style for example Tristram's Factory, West End (1930), Brisbane Boys College (1930), and Craigston (1926) from which as a high rise apartment block (albeit non-institutional), Blocks 1 and 2 may be seen to be derived. The firm's work at the Brisbane Hospital included General Blocks 2–4 (1930s), Medical Officers Quarters (1934; 1939), and the Brisbane Women's Hospital (1938 – in association with the Department of Public Works).

Whilst in the past, on site accommodation for the (female) nursing staff was seen as an integral part of both hospital efficiency and the propagation and maintenance of the nursing code, recent social and educational changes, have meant that the requirement for on-site nursing accommodation has greatly diminished. Options for the re-use of the three buildings were reported to be currently under consideration at the time of the heritage listing. In 2012, the Lady Lamington Nurses Home was reported by The Courier-Mail to be in a state of neglect.

== Description ==
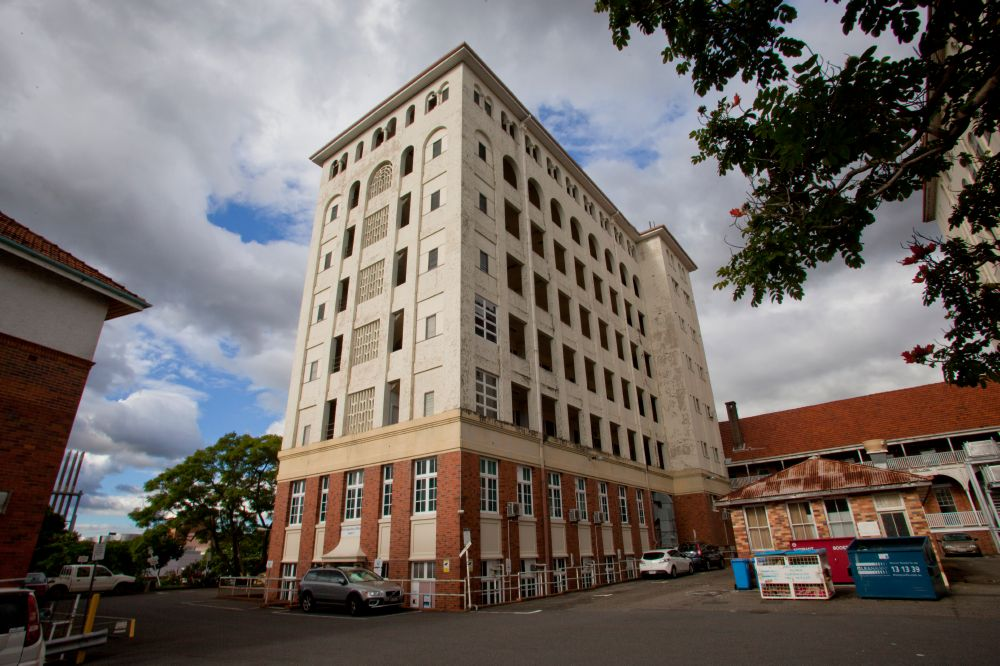
8-storey block, 2012

The Nurses' Homes consist of three linked buildings which form an integrated complex organised around a series of courtyards. The Lady Lamington Nurses Home is a lower brick building, E-shaped in plan, with timber verandahs and Marseille tiled roofs. It is situated on the crest of the hill, a steeply sloping site, and has walled courtyards facing east which contain established gardens. Attached to the western side of the lower building are two eight-storeyed towers (Blocks 1 and 2) of masonry construction. Block 1 was built by local builder J. Hutchinson & Sons (now Hutchinson Builders) for £31,345 along with a new hospital ward (Block 4) valued at £59,195, which was built concurrently. These towers are positioned opposite the southernmost and the central wings of the "E". All three buildings have sweeping views of Brisbane due to the elevated siting; to the north and east from the verandahs of the Lady Lamington and panoramic prospects in all directions from Blocks 1 and 2.

Built in three stages the Lady Lamington Nurses Home is two storeys with a basement in the older (1896) southernmost part. At the north eastern corner, the building perching dramatically on a steep slope is, due to the sudden fall in the land, five storeys tall. The courtyard gardens which contain mature palms, a poinciana, roses and azaleas are accessed from the verandahs via sweeping concrete stairs. The stairs and entrances to the courtyard are ornamented with concrete spheres mounted on low pillars.

The verandahs have simple timber balustrades constructed of square dowels and arched timber valances between the verandah posts at the second top level; the ground floor level at the southernmost end. Below this level the verandah posts are mostly brick forming a screen wall with arched openings. The verandah floors, timber in the first stage, are concrete in stage two (1914) and three (1931). The continuous verandahs are connected vertically by a series of external fire escape stairs and ladders.

The building has a gambrel roof, which also roofs the verandahs, and a number of brick chimneys. The chimney nearest the north eastern corner is brick with cement render bands. The English bond brickwork in the first section has been washed with a red-pigmented coating, and a cement-lime mixture has been painted on to resemble stretcher bond.

All the wings are connected by long central corridors which have rows of identical cells on either side. Each room opens onto the verandah via large double hung windows with sills at floor level; ceilings are sheeted in galvanised ripple iron; the spaces between the interior partitions and the ceilings have been infilled, mostly with glass louvres.

Climate-modulating features include:

- ridge-top location; 9 feet (2.7 m) wide verandahs to all sides
- large double hung windows which open from each room onto the verandahs
- tongue and groove interior partitions designed to assist cross ventilation by originally stopping 4 feet (1.2 m) short of the 13 feet (4.0 m) high

The eight-storeyed Blocks 1 and 2, similar in appearance and organisation, form two sides of a bitumen surfaced yard which is open at the western end. The lower two storeys, one of which is partly below ground level, have external walls of face brickwork while the upper six storeys are finished with white painted cement render. Arcaded verandahs run along the northern and southern elevations. The building has a number of decorative features that connect it to the Spanish Mission style such as textured render, arched openings, ornate columns at the uppermost level and decorative brackets and awnings at the ground level. Windows are metal framed with smallish panes. Both buildings have flat roofs with sloped tiled parapets. The lift motor rooms which protrude above the parapet level have Marseille tiled external walls and castellated parapets.

A lift and staircase is located at the eastern ends and a concrete staircase with metal balustrade at the western ends. The lift shaft is partly enclosed by a timber and glass screen. The eastern and western ends of the buildings are connected on almost every level by a central corridor that has a row of identical rooms on both sides. Each room opens onto the verandah via timber french doors. On the lowest floor of the southern building has a large recreation room containing a stage.

== Heritage listing ==
The Royal Brisbane Hospital Nurses' Home (including Lady Lamington Nurses Home and Blocks 1 and 2) was listed on the Queensland Heritage Register on 21 October 1992 having satisfied the following criteria.

The place is important in demonstrating the evolution or pattern of Queensland's history.

Constructed in 1896 on the crest of the hill overlooking the Brisbane Hospital, the Lady Lamington Nurses' Home became a prominent landmark from both within and without the hospital site. For nearly a century it has been a visible symbol of the role of the (for many years exclusively female) nursing profession in the provision of health care in Queensland. As the hospital developed into a highrise institution from the mid 1920s that symbolic prominence was maintained and magnified with the building in the 1930s of the eight storeyed Nurses' Homes Blocks 1 and 2. In addition, the two tower blocks were (and remain) a potent reminder (visible from much of the city) of the significant growth during this time of the state's premier hospital and correspondingly the implementation of the state labour government's new health policies.

The place is important in demonstrating the principal characteristics of a particular class of cultural places.

The Nurses' Homes form an integral part of the residential core of the Hospital. They clearly illustrate the centrality of the residential component to the functioning of the Hospital from the 1890s until recent times. Lady Lamington is the earliest surviving (and very intact) nurses quarters in Queensland. The three buildings rely on a similar plan (the highly ordered and repetitious layouts on several floors based on the deposition of cells about a central corridor with the whole encircled by verandahs) which typifies institutional residential buildings erected during this time; as does the integrated use of courtyards and gardens of Lady Lamington to create residential amenity and seclusion on a multiuse site.

The place is important because of its aesthetic significance.

The Lady Lamington Nurses' Home is a building in the Arts and Crafts style: the quality and inventiveness of the detailing, construction, and overall design enhancing the site with its views, elevation, and sudden falls.

The place is important in demonstrating a high degree of creative or technical achievement at a particular period.

The Lady Lamington Nurses' Home evidences the early development of architectural interest in refining elements associated with domestic buildings and climate control with devices such as awnings, verandahs, orientation, cross ventilation through the use of low partitions, and large well placed openings reworked for a different scale of building. These were to be abiding interests of architect RS (Robin) Dods in his reworking of the Queensland idiom.

The place has a special association with the life or work of a particular person, group or organisation of importance in Queensland's history.

Lady Lamington is the first Queensland building designed by Dods, arguably Queensland's finest architect. It also marks the beginning of a long association between the hospital and his firm Hall and Dods. The pre-eminent interwar architectural firm Conrad and Atkinson (later Conrad and Gargett) were from the 1920s important hospital architects in Queensland from the 1920s and architects to the Brisbane Hospital from the 1920s to 1980s. Executed in the Spanish Mission style, established by architects Atkinson and Conrad from the 1920s as the hospital house style, Nurses' Homes Blocks 1 and 2 echo some of the motifs of Lady Lamington Nurses Home.
