= Beryl Burbridge =

Australian hospital matron

Beryl Emma Burbridge
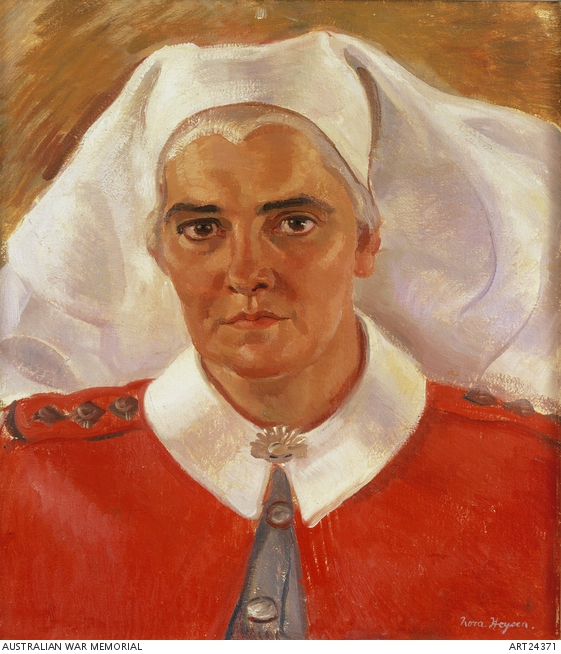
- Born: 4 March 1902; Gympie, Queensland, Australia
- Died: 27 November 1988 (aged 86); Stafford, Queensland, Australia
- Military career
- Allegiance: Australia
- Branch: Australian Army
- Service years: 1941–1946
- Rank: Captain
- Service number: QX43171
- Unit: Australian Army Nursing Service
- Conflicts: Second World War
- Awards: Officer of the Order of the British Empire

Beryl Emma Burbridge, OBE (4 March 1902 – 27 November 1988) was an Australian hospital matron who worked on malaria treatments during the Second World War at a research unit. She later worked at the Royal Brisbane Hospital and served as president of the Queensland branch of the Royal Australian Nursing Federation from 1959 to 1960.

== Early life ==
Burbridge was born on 4 March 1902 in Gympie, Queensland. Her Australian-born parents were Maria Esther (née Wardle) and William Edward Burbidge. Her father was an assayer who later became mayor. He moved to Gympie in 1893 during the gold rush. Burbridge was the youngest of nine children and had eight older siblings. She trained as a nurse at the Royal Brisbane Hospital.

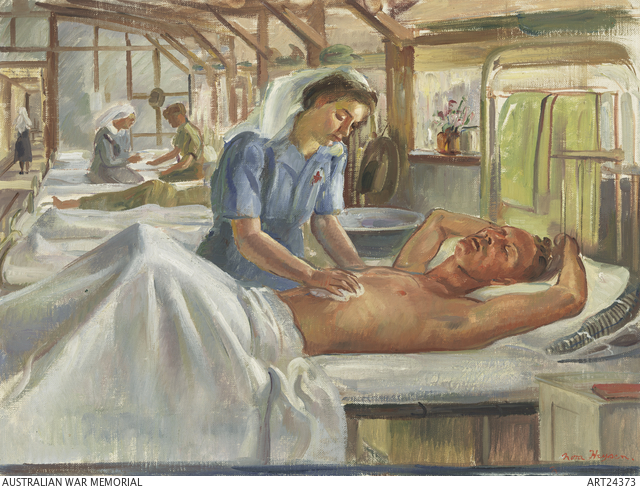
Private Hazel Lugge caring for Ken Glover's malaria at the Medical Research Unit with Matron Burbidge in the background

== Nursing career ==
In May 1941 Burbridge joined the Australian Army Nursing Service. She was initially a sister in Ipswich at the 6th Casualty Clearing Station. In November 1942 she joined the Second Australian Imperial Force and became a captain in March 1943. She was in Papua New Guinea for just four months before she returned to Cairns in Queensland in 1944, where she led the nurses at the Land Headquarters Medical Research Unit until the end of the war. In 1945 the war artist Nora Heysen completed a painting of her. Heysen was in Australia and Papua New Guinea from 1944 to 1946. During her time at the Land Headquarters Medical Research Unit there were secret experiments involving malaria experiments on volunteers. The breakthroughs gave a distinct advantage to the Australian military as rates for malaria fell from 74% to under 3%. Another painting by Nora Hensen of a nurse treating a patient at the unit shows Burbridge in the background. There were later enquiries into a speculation that the Americans and British had exploited Australian volunteers. After a wide enquiry it was found that the work was very valuable and there was no conspiracy.

In 1958 Burbridge became the General Matron at the Royal Brisbane Hospital. She was an imposing figure who used discipline to command. She retired in 1968 and she was appointed an Officer of the Order of the British Empire in the same year.

Burbridge died in her home in Stafford, Queensland on 27 November 1988.
