= Royal Brisbane and Women's Hospital =

- Queensland Health (Metro North Health)
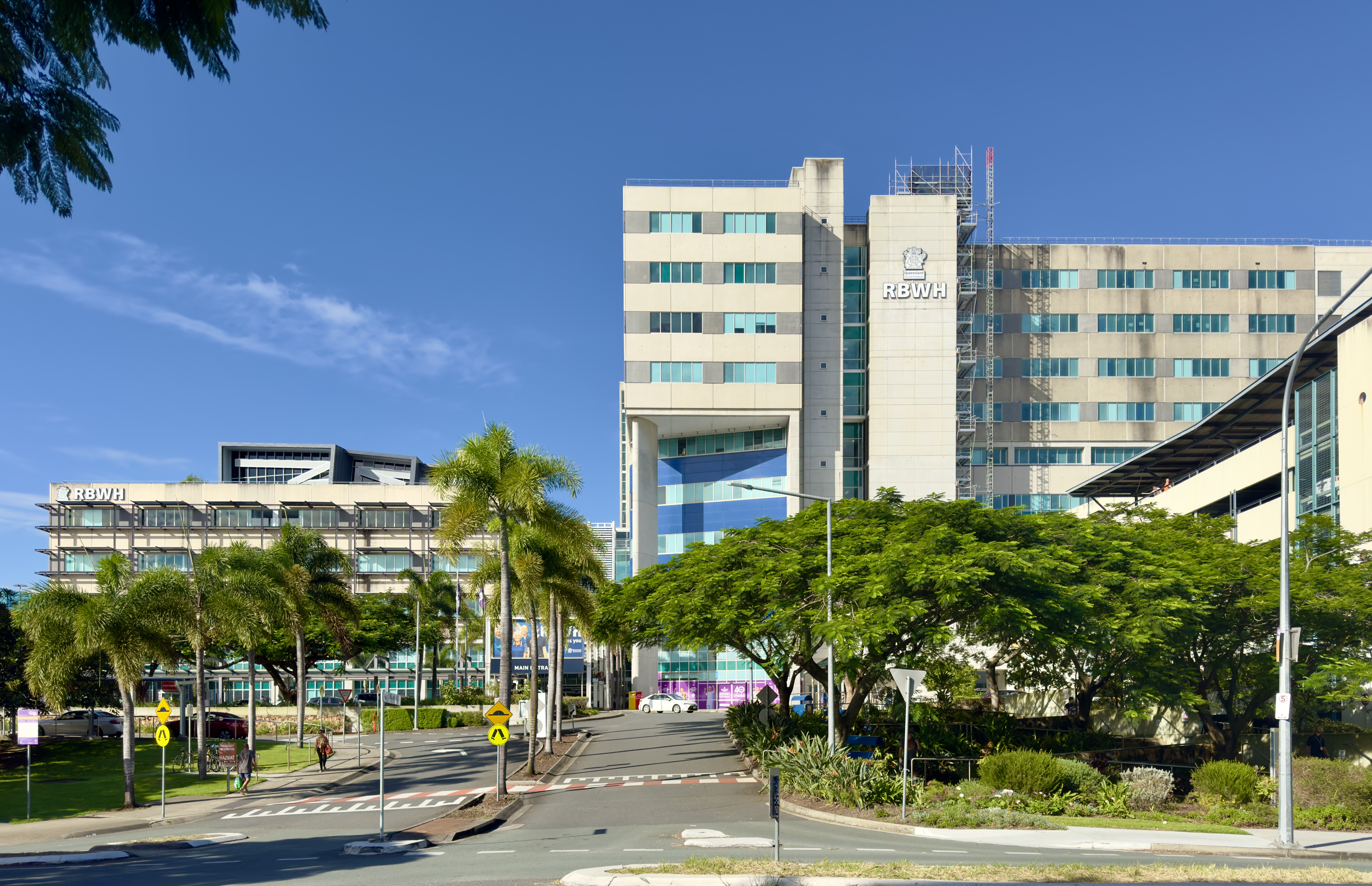

Geography
- Location: Butterfield Street, Herston, Queensland, Australia
- Coordinates: 27.4469°S 153.0283°E

Organisation
- Care system: Public Medicare (AU)
- Type: Teaching
- Affiliated university: University of Queensland; Queensland University of Technology

Services
- Emergency department: Yes (adult only)
- Beds: 929 acute inpatient

Helipads
- Helipad: Yes (ICAO: YRBC & YRBH)

History
- Former names: Royal Brisbane Hospital; Royal Brisbane Women's Hospital; Brisbane General Hospital; Bowen Hospital
- Opened: 2003 as RBWH

Links
- Website: metronorth.health.qld.gov.au/rbwh
- Lists: Hospitals in Australia

The Royal Brisbane and Women's Hospital (RBWH) is a tertiary public hospital located in Herston, a suburb of Brisbane, Queensland, Australia. It is operated by Metro North Health, part of the Queensland Health network. The hospital has 929 beds, and it is estimated that 65% of the patients served come from within 15 kilometres (9.3 mi) of the hospital. It is the largest hospital in Australia, and is a major teaching and research hospital.

The hospital is supported by the Royal Brisbane and Women’s Hospital Foundation (RBWHF), a registered hospital foundation that raises philanthropic funding to support medical research, staff education and patient care initiatives associated with the hospital and research institutes within the Herston Health Precinct.

The Royal Brisbane and Women's Hospital is located in the broader the Herston Health Precinct, which includes other facilities such as the QIMR Berghofer Medical Research Institute and the Surgical, Treatment and Rehabilitation Service (STARS).

== History ==
The main building of the Bowen Hospital as it was initially known, was designed by Charles Tiffin and others. For a time it was also known as Brisbane General Hospital. In the 19th century the hospital dealt with some severe cases of tropical diseases due to Queensland's predominantly tropical climate.

The hospital was created by the merging of the Royal Brisbane Hospital and the Royal Brisbane Women's Hospital in 2003. The women's hospital was demolished first, in 1998, to make way for the new building, after which the acute hospital was demolished. In the same year the hospital precinct was listed on the Queensland Heritage Register.

In January 2008, there was a public health scare over concerns about lead levels at the hospital. Concerns were dismissed by Queensland Health after air and surface swabs carried out found lead levels were safely below recommended standards.

In February 2008, the hospital was hit with an outbreak of an antibiotic resistant bug, Vancomycin-resistant Enterococcus or VRE. The hospital closed two 30-bed wards to new admissions in early December after 21 patients tested positive to VRE, while staff contained spread of the bacteria.

== See also ==
- List of hospitals in Australia
- RBWH busway station
