= Lagoon Pocket =

- Suburb
- Interactive map of Lagoon Pocket
- Coordinates: 26.2777°S 152.6833°E
- Country: Australia
- State: Queensland
- LGA: Gympie Region
- Location: 12.6 km (7.8 mi) S of Gympie; 168 km (104 mi) N of Brisbane

Government
  - State electorate: Gympie
  - Federal division: Wide Bay

Area
  - Total: 7.1 km^{2} (2.7 sq mi)

Population
  - Total: 170 (2021 census)
  - Density: 23.9/km^{2} (62.0/sq mi)
- Time zone: UTC+10:00 (AEST)
- Postcode: 4570
Suburbs around Lagoon Pocket
The Dawn	The Dawn	Kybong
Long Flat	Lagoon Pocket	Kybong
Calico Creek	Gilldora	Kybong

Lagoon Pocket is a rural locality in the Gympie Region, Queensland, Australia. In the 2021 census, Lagoon Pocket had a population of 170 people.

== Geography ==
Mary Valley Road (State Route 51) forms most of the western boundary. The Mary Valley Branch Railway passes through from north-west to south, forming part of the north-western boundary, with the former Lagoon Pocket railway station in the west of the locality (26.2759°S 152.6701°E).The Mary River forms almost the entire eastern boundary.

The land use is a mixture of rural residential housing, grazing on native vegetation, and crop-growing.

== History ==
Lagoon Pocket Provisional School opened on 25 September 1882 but closed in December 1899 to allow a new building to be constructed. It reopened on 6 June 1900 as Lagoon Pocket State School. It closed on 3 July 1970. It was at 57 Lagoon Pocket Road, now within the neighbouring locality of Long Flat.

== Demographics ==
In the 2016 census, Lagoon Pocket had a population of 123 people.

In the 2021 census, Lagoon Pocket had a population of 170 people.

== Education ==
There are no schools in Lagoon Pocket. The nearest government primary schools are Jones Hill State School in Jones Hill to the north and Dagun State School in Dagun to the south. The nearest government secondary school is Gympie State High School in Gympie to the north.
