= Calico Creek, Queensland =

Calico Creek
- Suburb
- Interactive map of Calico Creek
- Coordinates: 26.3°S 152.6416°E
- Country: Australia
- State: Queensland
- LGA: Gympie Region
- Location: 14.7 km (9.1 mi) S of Gympie; 171 km (106 mi) N of Brisbane

Government
  - State electorate: Gympie
  - Federal division: Wide Bay

Area
  - Total: 16.8 km^{2} (6.5 sq mi)

Population
  - Total: 185 (2021 census)
  - Density: 11.01/km^{2} (28.52/sq mi)
- Time zone: UTC+10:00 (AEST)
- Postcode: 4570
Suburbs around Calico Creek
Mooloo	McIntosh Creek; Long Flat	Lagoon Pocket
Mooloo	Calico Creek	Gilldora
Amamoor Creek	Amamoor	Dagun

Calico Creek is a rural locality in the Gympie Region, Queensland, Australia. In the 2021 census, Calico Creek had a population of 185 people.

== Geography ==
Mary Valley Road (State Route 51) forms the north-eastern boundary. Calico Creek, a tributary of the Mary River, rises in the south of the locality and flows through to the north. Almost all of the southern boundary is the northern extent of Amamoor National Park.

== History ==
Calico Creek State School opened on 8 July 1936 and closed on 31 August 1970. The school was at 8 Robinson Road (south-east corner of Calico Creek Road, 26.29974°S 152.64754°E).

== Demographics ==
In the 2016 census, Calico Creek had a population of 156 people.

In the 2021 census, Calico Creek had a population of 185 people.

== Education ==
There are no schools in Calico Creek. The nearest government primary schools are Dagun State School in neighbouring Dagun to the south-east and Jones Hill State School in Jones Hill to the north. The nearest government secondary school is Gympie State High School in Gympie to the north.
