= McIntosh Creek, Queensland =

McIntosh Creek
- Suburb
- Interactive map of McIntosh Creek
- Coordinates: 26.2597°S 152.6388°E
- Country: Australia
- State: Queensland
- LGA: Gympie Region
- Location: 11.5 km (7.1 mi) SW of Gympie; 171 km (106 mi) N of Brisbane

Government
  - State electorate: Gympie
  - Federal division: Wide Bay

Area
  - Total: 6.4 km^{2} (2.5 sq mi)

Population
  - Total: 173 (2021 census)
  - Density: 27.03/km^{2} (70.0/sq mi)
- Time zone: UTC+10:00 (AEST)
- Postcode: 4570
Suburbs around McIntosh Creek
Pie Creek	Jones Hill	Jones Hill
Mooloo	McIntosh Creek	Long Flat
Mooloo	Calico Creek	Calico Creek

McIntosh Creek is a rural locality in the Gympie Region, Queensland, Australia. In the 2021 census, McIntosh Creek had a population of 173 people.

== Geography ==
The creek Pie Creek forms the western boundary of the locality.

McIntosh Creek Road enters the locality from the north (Jones Hill) and proceeds southwards through the locality, forming a short section of the southern boundary, before exiting to the south-west (Calico Creek). It is the main access route through the locality.

The land use is a mix of grazing on native vegetation, horticulture (particularly macadamias), and rural residential housing.

== Demographics ==
In the 2016 census, McIntosh Creek had a population of 118 people.

In the 2021 census, McIntosh Creek had a population of 173 people.

== Education ==
There are no schools in McIntosh Creek. The nearest government primary schools are Jones Hill State School in neighbouring Jones Hill to the north-east and Dagun State School in Dagun to the south-east. The nearest government secondary school is Gympie State High School in Gympie to the north. There are also non-government schools in Gympie and its suburbs.
