= Long Flat, Queensland =

Long Flat
- Suburb
- Interactive map of Long Flat
- Coordinates: 26.2666°S 152.6625°E
- Country: Australia
- State: Queensland
- LGA: Gympie Region
- Location: 9.6 km (6.0 mi) S of Gympie; 161 km (100 mi) N of Brisbane

Government
  - State electorate: Gympie
  - Federal division: Wide Bay

Area
  - Total: 5.5 km^{2} (2.1 sq mi)

Population
  - Total: 98 (2021 census)
  - Density: 17.82/km^{2} (46.1/sq mi)
- Time zone: UTC+10:00 (AEST)
- Postcode: 4570
Suburbs around Long Flat
| McIntosh Creek | Jones Hill | The Dawn |
| McIntosh Creek | Long Flat | The Dawn |
| McIntosh Creek | Calico Creek | Lagoon Pocket |

Long Flat is a rural locality in the Gympie Region, Queensland, Australia. In the 2021 census, Long Flat had a population of 98 people.

== Geography ==
The Mary Valley Road (State Route 51) runs through from north to south.

== History ==
Lagoon Pocket Provisional School opened on 25 September 1882 but closed in December 1899 to allow a new building to be constructed. It reopened on 6 June 1900 as Lagoon Pocket State School. It closed on 3 July 1970. It was at 57 Lagoon Pocket Road (26.2729°S 152.6679°E).

== Demographics ==
In the 2016 census, Long Flat had a population of 80 people.

In the 2021 census, Long Flat had a population of 98 people.

== Heritage listings ==
Long Flat has the following heritage listings:

- Lagoon Pocket Methodist Church, 735 Mary Valley Road (26.26910°S 152.66344°E)
- Long Flat Hall, 705 Mary Valley Road (26.26611°S 152.66341°E)

== Education ==
There are no schools in Long Flat. The nearest government primary schools are Jones Hill State School in neighbouring Jones Hill to the north and Dagun State School in Dagun to the south. The nearest government secondary school is Gympie State High School in Gympie to the north.
