= Kybong, Queensland =

Kybong
- Suburb
- Interactive map of Kybong
- Coordinates: 26.2875°S 152.7111°E
- Country: Australia
- State: Queensland
- LGA: Gympie Region
- Location: 16.0 km (9.9 mi) SSE of Gympie; 20.8 km (12.9 mi) NNE of Imbil; 22.3 km (13.9 mi) NW of Pomona; 29.0 km (18.0 mi) NW of Cooroy; 161 km (100 mi) N of Brisbane

Government
  - State electorate: Gympie
  - Federal division: Wide Bay

Area
  - Total: 36.2 km^{2} (14.0 sq mi)

Population
  - Total: 363 (2021 census)
  - Density: 10.028/km^{2} (25.97/sq mi)
- Time zone: UTC+10:00 (AEST)
- Postcode: 4570
Suburbs around Kybong
The Dawn	Glanmire	Woondum
Lagoon Pocket; Gilldora	Kybong	Tandur
Dagun; Amamoor	Coles Creek	Traveston

Kybong is a rural locality in the Gympie Region, Queensland, Australia. In the 2021 census, Kybong had a population of 363 people.

== Geography ==
Kybong is 11 kilometres (7 mi) south-east of Gympie's central business district along the Bruce Highway, which passes through the locality from the south-east (Traveston) to the north (Glanmire).

The Mary River forms the western boundary.

Gympie Aerodrome is at 20 Lobwein Road (26.2900°S 152.7029°E). The Gympie Aero Club and Gympie Gliding Club are based there in addition to flight training and aircraft maintenance services. It is operated by the Gympie Regional Council.

The locality is home to a large truck stop on the Old Bruce Highway. The truck stop was home to Matilda, the mascot of the 1982 Commonwealth Games before it was relocated to a new truck stop in neighbouring Traveston.

== History ==
Kybong Provisional School opened on 1 October 1905. On 1 January 1909, it became Kybong State School. It closed on 6 August 1960. The school was at 1320 Old Bruce Highway (26.28674°S 152.71067°E).

Mawarra Independent School opened in 2020.

== Demographics ==
In the 2006 census, Kybong had a population of 370 people.

In the 2016 census, Kybong had a population of 333 people.

In the 2021 census, Kybong had a population of 363 people.

== Heritage listings ==
Kybong has the following heritage sites:

- Kybong Hall, 1347 Old Bruce Highway (26.29389°S 152.71102°E)

== Education ==
Mawarra Independent School is an independent primary and secondary (Prep to Year 10) school for boys and girls at 889-967 Old Bruce Highway (26.25926°S 152.70705°E). As at 2023, the school had an enrolment of 47 students.

There are no government schools in Kybong. The nearest government primary schools are Monkland State School in Monkland to the north, Dagun State School in neighbouring Dagun to the south-west, and Cooran State School in Cooran to the south-east. The government secondary schools are Gympie State High School in Gympie to the north, Mary Valley State College (to Year 10) in Imbil, and the Noosa District State High School in Pomona (junior campus) and Cooroy (senior campus).
