= Long Flat =

Long Flat may refer to the following places:

- Long Flat, New South Wales
- Long Flat, Queensland, a locality in Gympie Region, Queensland, Australia
- Long Flat, South Australia
