= The Dawn, Queensland =

The Dawn
- Suburb
- Interactive map of The Dawn
- Coordinates: 26.2488°S 152.6847°E
- Country: Australia
- State: Queensland
- LGA: Gympie Region
- Location: 9.6 km (6.0 mi) S of Gympie CBD; 165 km (103 mi) N of Brisbane

Government
  - State electorate: Gympie
  - Federal division: Wide Bay

Area
  - Total: 8.8 km^{2} (3.4 sq mi)

Population
  - Total: 604 (2021 census)
  - Density: 68.6/km^{2} (177.8/sq mi)
- Time zone: UTC+10:00 (AEST)
- Postcode: 4570
Suburbs around The Dawn
| Jones Hill | Monkland | Glanmire |
| Jones Hill | The Dawn | Kybong |
| Long Flat | Lagoon Pocket | Kybong |

The Dawn is a rural residential locality in the Gympie Region, Queensland, Australia. In the 2021 census, The Dawn had a population of 604 people.

== Geography ==
The Dawn is 8 kilometres (5 mi) south of Gympie's central business district on the south-western bank of the Mary River, which forms its eastern boundary. Mary Valley Road (State Route 51) forms part of the western boundary.

The Mary Valley Branch Railway passes through from north-east to south, where the line forms part of the south-eastern boundary. The former Dawn railway station served the locality (26.2456°S 152.6837°E).

The Dawn is a mostly rural-residential area dependent upon Jones Hill and Southside for facilities. The eastern part of the locality is used for grazing on native vegetation.

There are two hills in the locality:

- Dawn Hill (26.2430°S 152.6825°E)
- James Hill (26.2413°S 152.68°E)

== Demographics ==
At the 2006 census, The Dawn had a population of 683 people.

In the 2016 census, The Dawn had a population of 545 people.

In the 2021 census, The Dawn had a population of 604 people.

== Education ==
There are no schools in The Dawn. The nearest government primary school is Jones Hill State School in neighbouring Jones Hill to the north-west. The nearest government secondary school is Gympie State High School in Gympie to the north.
