= Gilldora, Queensland =

Gilldora
- Suburb
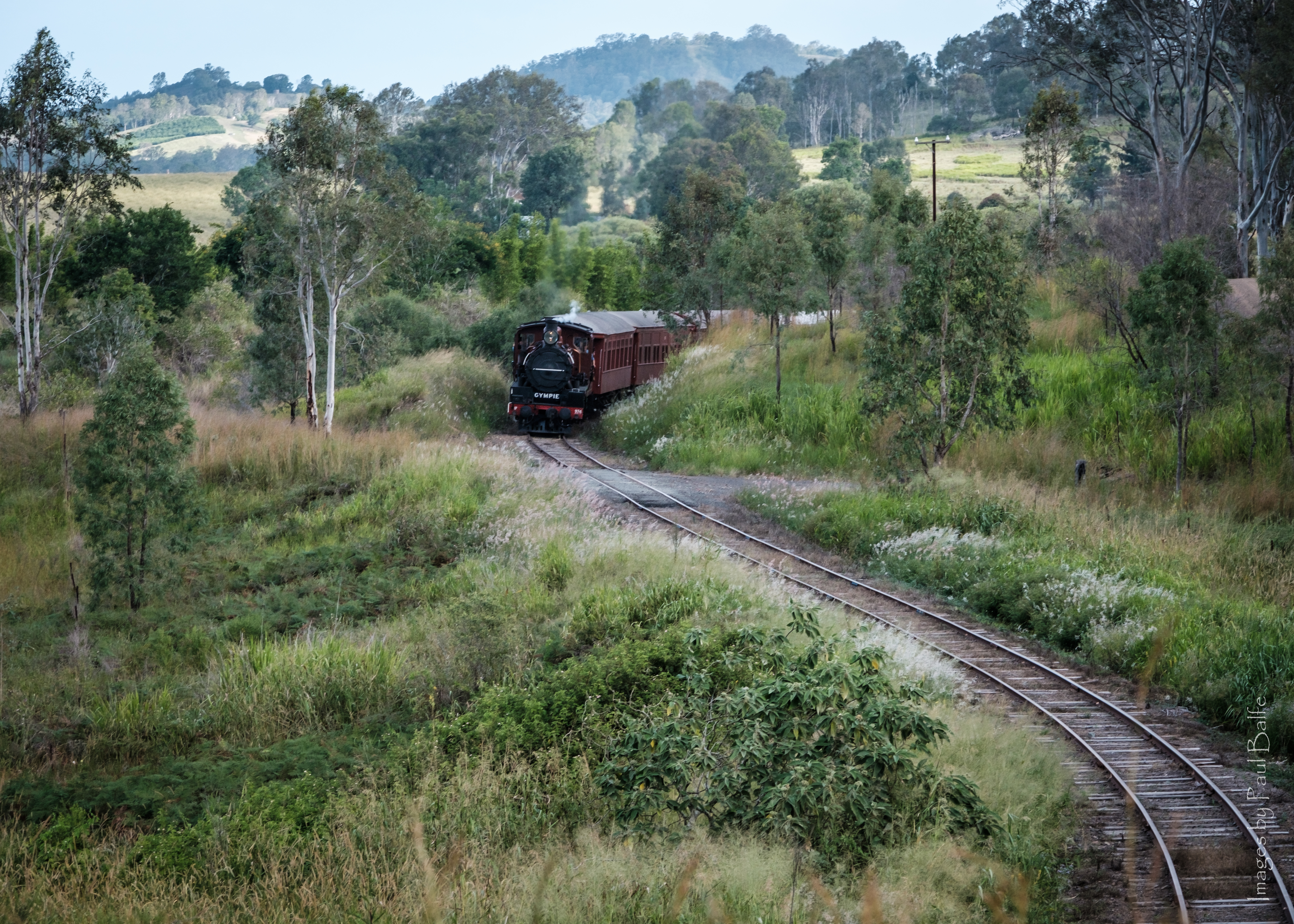
- Mary Valley Rattler approaching Gilldora Road, 2019

- Interactive map of Gilldora
- Coordinates: 26.3°S 152.6791°E
- Country: Australia
- State: Queensland
- LGA: Gympie Region
- Location: 4 km (2.5 mi) S of Gympie; 166 km (103 mi) N of Brisbane

Government
  - State electorate: Gympie
  - Federal division: Wide Bay

Area
  - Total: 3.9 km^{2} (1.5 sq mi)

Population
  - Total: 50 (2021 census)
  - Density: 12.8/km^{2} (33/sq mi)
- Time zone: UTC+10:00 (AEST)
- Postcode: 4570
Suburbs around Gilldora
Calico Creek	Lagoon Pocket	Kybong
Calico Creek	Gilldora	Kybong
Dagun	Dagun	Kybong

Gilldora is a rural locality in the Gympie Region, Queensland, Australia. In the 2021 census, Gilldora had a population of 50 people.

== Geography ==
The Mary River forms the north-eastern and eastern boundaries.

The Mary Valley Road (State Route 51) enters the locality from north-west (Calico Creek / Lagoon Pocket) and exits to the south (Dagun).

The Mary Valley railway line enters the locality from the north (Lagoon Pocket) and exits to the south (Dagun). The locality was served by the now-abandoned Gilldora railway station (26.2986°S 152.6769°E).

The land use is a mixture of grazing on native vegetation, crop growing, and rural residential housing.

== History ==
The locality takes its name from its former railway station name, which in turn was named on 16 October 1922, reportedly a coined word from local resident Gillman "dorado", which happens to be an Aboriginal word meaning pleasant place.

== Demographics ==
In the 2016 census, Gilldora had a population of 39 people.

In the 2021 census, Gilldora had a population of 50 people.

== Education ==
There are no school in Gilldora. The nearest government primary school is Dagun State School in neighbouring Dagun to the south. The nearest government secondary school is Gympie State High School in Gympie to the north.

== Attractions ==
The Mary Valley Rattler is a tourist train that operates on the Mary Valley railway line passing through Gilldora.
