= Jeanette Anne Gilbert =

Australian educationist (1883–1960)

- Born: 3 August 1883; Red Hill, Queensland, Australia
- Died: 16 March 1960 (aged 76); South Brisbane, Queensland, Australia
- Education: University of Queensland (B.A.)
- Occupations: teacher and educationalist
- Writing career
- Subject: Embroidery

Jeanette Anne Gilbert (3 August 1883 – 16 March 1960) was an Australian educationist. She taught teenage trainee teachers at Kelvin Grove Teachers College until 1944.

== Early life ==
Gilbert was born in 1883 in the Red Hill suburb of Brisbane joining ten siblings. Her parents were the Danish born Lucia Christina, (born Peterson) and her Scottish born husband James Gilbert. Her father was a clerk. Gympie State High School was one of the first secondary schools and it opened in 1912 with Gilbert as an early staff member. In the same year she became an external student at the University of Queensland. In 1917, Gilbert graduated from the University of Queensland with a Bachelor of Arts.

== Career ==
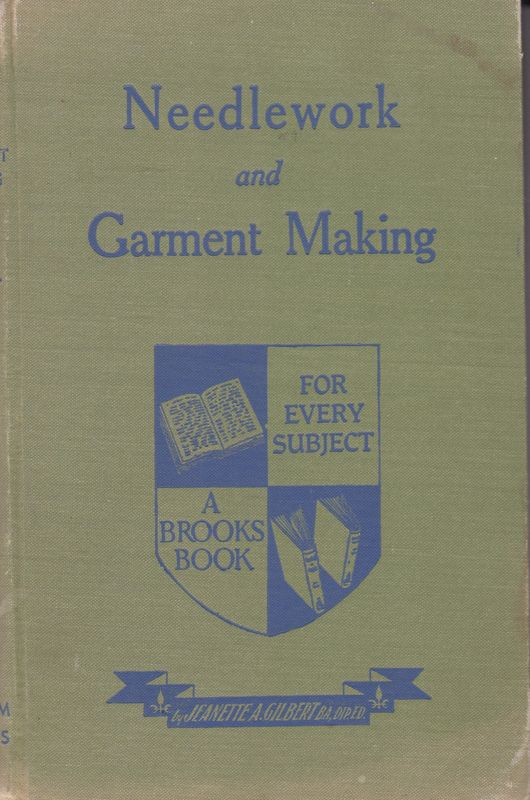
Needlework and Garment-making for Schools was published in 1934.

In 1918, Gilbert joined Kelvin Grove Teachers College which had been established a few years before. In 1922, she was allowed a year's leave to obtain the University of Melbourne's Diploma of Education which was a rare achievement for a woman. Gilbert was particularly skilled playing the piano and sewing. With her qualifications, she was set to teach teenage trainee teachers educational theory, music, and needlework. By 1927 she was a class one teacher earning £420 per annum.

Gilbert published a guide to needlework, making clothes and how to teach those skills in school in 1934.

Gilbert became a senior lecturess in 1937. She was known for her regal stature and high standards of behavior. She would abandon the curriculum to lecture her charges about their duties to their employers and to themselves and how they were expected to be an example to their students. She retired in 1944.

== Later life ==
Gilbert lived a frugal retirement and died in South Brisbane in 1960.
