= Gympie Airport =

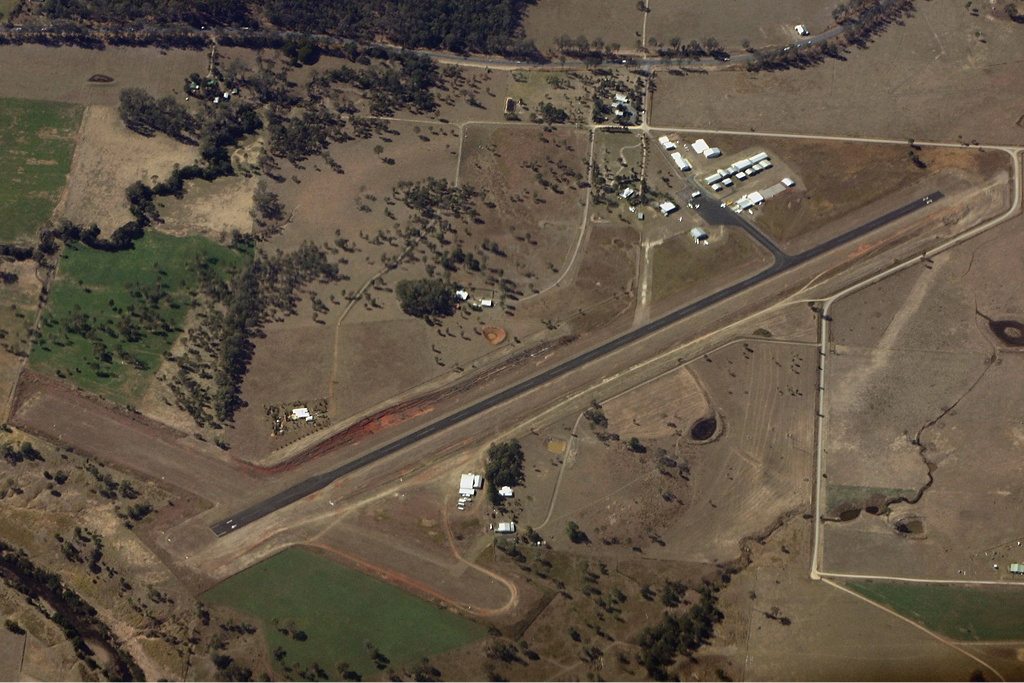
- IATA: GYP; ICAO: YGYM

Summary
- Airport type: Public
- Owner: Gympie Region
- Operator: Gympie Airfield Management Committee
- Serves: Gympie, Queensland, Australia
- Elevation AMSL: 260 ft (79 m)
- Coordinates: 26°17′21″S 152°42′09″E

Map
- Location in Queensland

Runways
Direction	Length		Surface
Direction	m	ft	Surface
03/21	596	1,955	Grass
14/32	1,402	4,600	Asphalt
- Sources: AIP

Gympie Airport (IATA: GYP, ICAO: YGYM) is located approximately 12 km (7.5 mi) south of the Gympie town centre in Kybong, Gympie Region, Queensland, Australia. The airport serves as a small regional airport serving the local area.

== See also ==
- List of airports in Queensland
