= Kelvin Grove Teachers College =

Australian teachers' college

Kelvin Grove Teachers' College was a teacher education institution in Brisbane, established in 1961 as the successor to the Queensland Teachers' Training College. It later became part of the Queensland University of Technology.

== History ==
The Brisbane School of Arts was formed in 1849, although it did not take an interest in formal education until the 1880s.

The Queensland Teachers' Training College was established in 1914 with an initial enrolment of 25 students. In 1918 Jeanette Anne Gilbert joined the staff and was granted a year's leave to obtain a Diploma of Education at the University of Melbourne.

In 1923 the college moved to the former Trades Hall on the corner of Edward and Turbot Streets in Brisbane, where it remained until January 1942. The following month, it relocated to the campus of the North Brisbane Intermediate School at Kelvin Grove. At that time, enrolment had increased to 676 students, most of whom were enrolled in the primary teaching course. The student body had also included 72 mature-aged students recruited to address wartime teacher shortages.

The institution subsequently underwent a series of name changes: Senior Teachers' Training College (1944), Queensland Teachers' College (1950), Kelvin Grove Teachers' College (1961), Kelvin Grove College of Teacher Education (1974), Kelvin Grove College of Advanced Education (1976), Kelvin Grove Campus of the Brisbane College of Advanced Education (1982), and Kelvin Grove Campus of the Queensland University of Technology (1990).

== Notable alumni ==
- Fran Bailey
- Major General Michael Fairweather, AM
- Jeanette Anne Gilbert taught here from 1918 to 1944.
- Alan Jones
- Laurie Lawrence, former Australian Olympic swimming coach and Rugby Union international.
