= Craigerne =

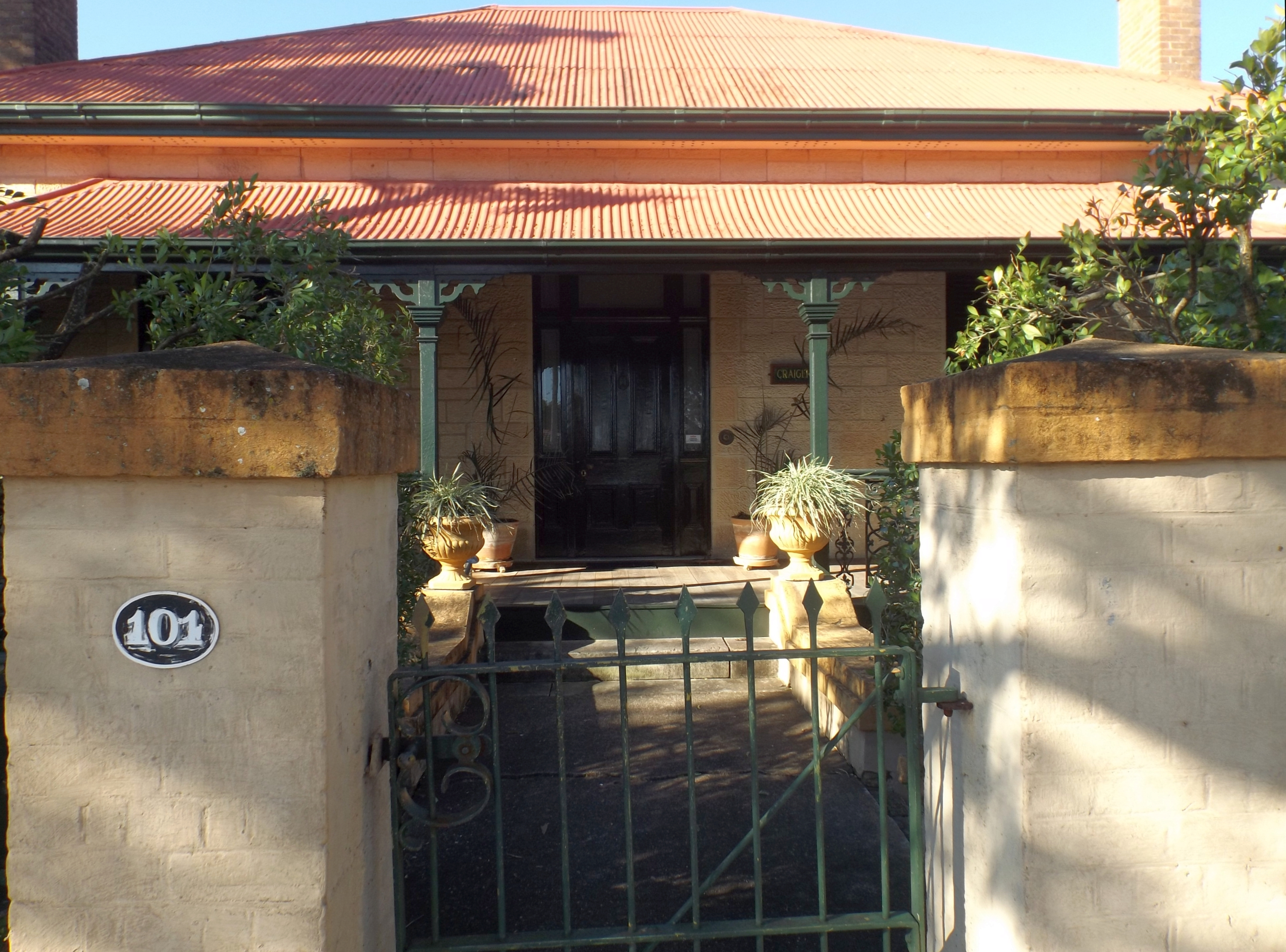
- Entrance, 2015

- Location within Queensland Location within Australia
- 27.4487°S 153.0061°E
- Location: 101 Windsor Road, Red Hill, City of Brisbane, Queensland, Australia

History
- Design period: 1840s–1860s (mid-19th century)
- Built: 1868

Site notes
- Architectural style: Colonial Georgian

Queensland Heritage Register
- Official name: Craigerne
- Type: state heritage (built)
- Designated: 21 October 1992
- Reference no.: 600286
- Significant period: 1860s (fabric, historical)
- Significant components: fence/wall – perimeter, residential accommodation – main house

Craigerne is a heritage-listed detached house at 101 Windsor Road, Red Hill, City of Brisbane, Queensland, Australia. It was built in 1868. It was added to the Queensland Heritage Register on 21 October 1992.

== History ==
Craigerne is part of a deed of grant taken up by William McFarlane in 1864. In 1866 McFarlane sold the whole of portion 512 to William McCallum Park, a stonemason and building contractor who subdivided the property into 20 allotments and created Park Street. He kept subdivisions 1,2 & 3 for himself.

Though it is possible that the house was built before the 1880s, the first occupant listed in street directories was Major Walter Snelling who lived there from 1885 until 1887 when Park's father, Andrew, moved in. The Parks' affairs were in the hands of liquidators in 1892–1893 when the property passed to the mortgagee, the Queensland National Bank.

In 1915, it was bought by solicitor Herbert Hemmings. After his death in 1940 it passed into other hands, to be turned into flats in 1950. In 1979 the purchasers were C.A. and Z.W. Wilczynski, who carried out the restoration. The premises were sold again in 1985, resulting in further alterations.

== Description ==
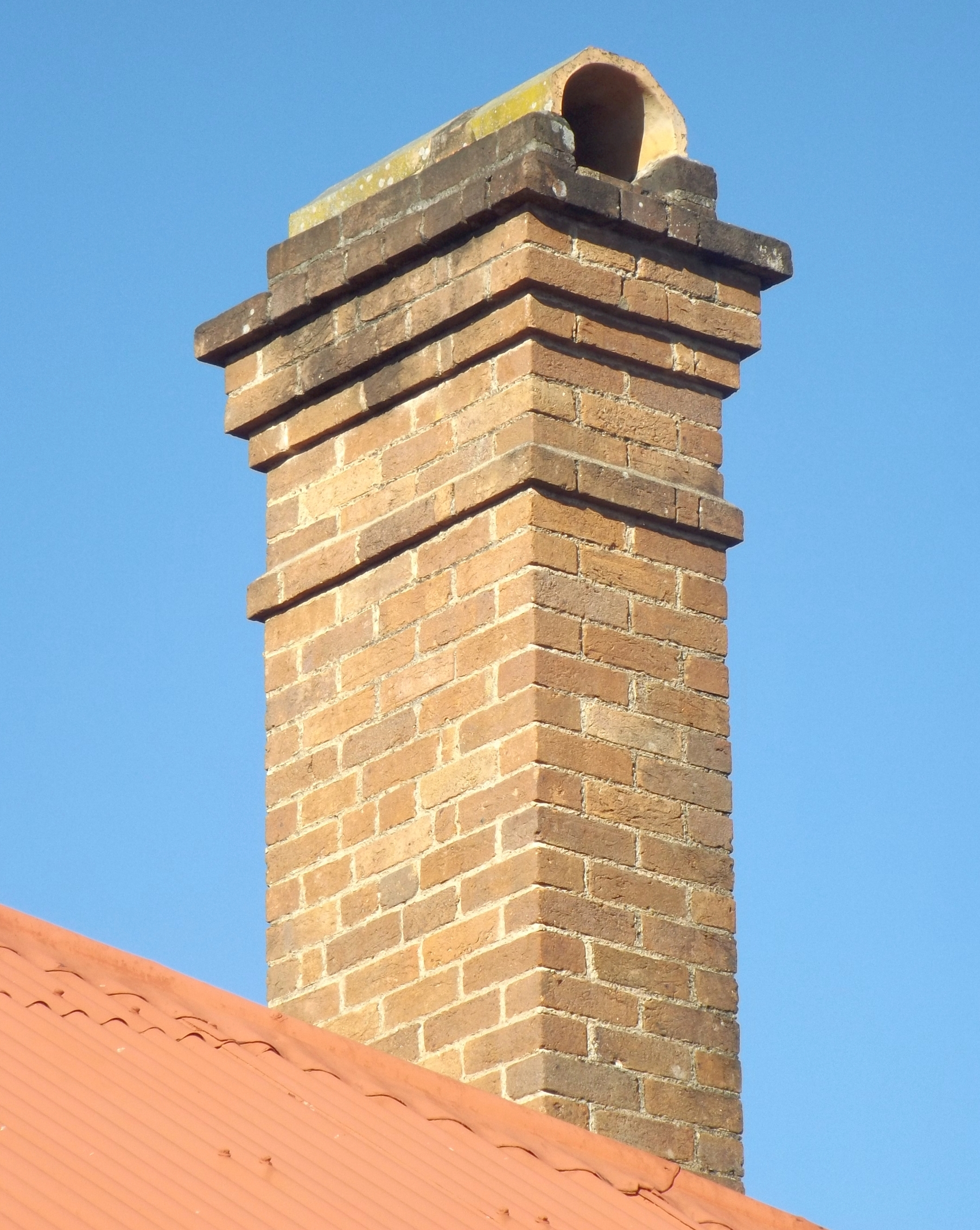
Craigerne residence chimney, 2015

The rectangular two-storeyed stone house may be described as Colonial Georgian in style, being symmetrical and simple in plan, appearance and detail, with the exception of cast-iron balustrading of front and back verandahs. The external walls are of random ashlar in front, but rubble stone elsewhere, and the hipped roof is of corrugated iron. The long sash windows are louver-shuttered and the verandah roof is concave in form.

Though appearing to be single-storeyed from the street, the sloping land allows for a second floor underneath, each consisting of two rooms on either side of a central hall. The upper rooms on the northern side are connected by folding doors, while the original kitchen is located downstairs. Four chimneys serve fireplaces in each of the eight rooms. Internal walls are brick with plaster rendering. All ceilings are lath and plaster and the substantial joinery is cedar. By and large the house lacks elaboration inside or out.

It was exceptionally well built with first-rate materials throughout, and was restored in the 1980s with the assistance of conservation architects, including the original colour scheme and replicated balustrading.

A two-storey annexe has been built to the right and connected on the upper level by a covered walkway. The new building, while intended to be sympathetic in scale and texture to the original house, has necessitated a wall-opening to accommodate the walkway.

The Windsor Road frontage has a substantial wrought-iron fence with brick piers which seems to be contemporary with the house.

== Heritage listing ==
Craigerne was listed on the Queensland Heritage Register on 21 October 1992 having satisfied the following criteria.

The place is important in demonstrating the evolution or pattern of Queensland's history.

Craigerne is significant as an unusually late example of the Colonial Georgian architectural style and stone construction.

Craigerne is significant for its pleasing symmetrical appearance and quality materials and craftsmanship.

The place demonstrates rare, uncommon or endangered aspects of Queensland's cultural heritage.

Craigerne is significant as an unusually late example of the Colonial Georgian architectural style and stone construction.

The place is important because of its aesthetic significance.

Craigerne is significant for its pleasing symmetrical appearance and quality materials and craftsmanship.
