= St Brigid's Convent, Red Hill =

Former Roman Catholic convent in Brisbane

St Brigid's Convent (former), Red Hill
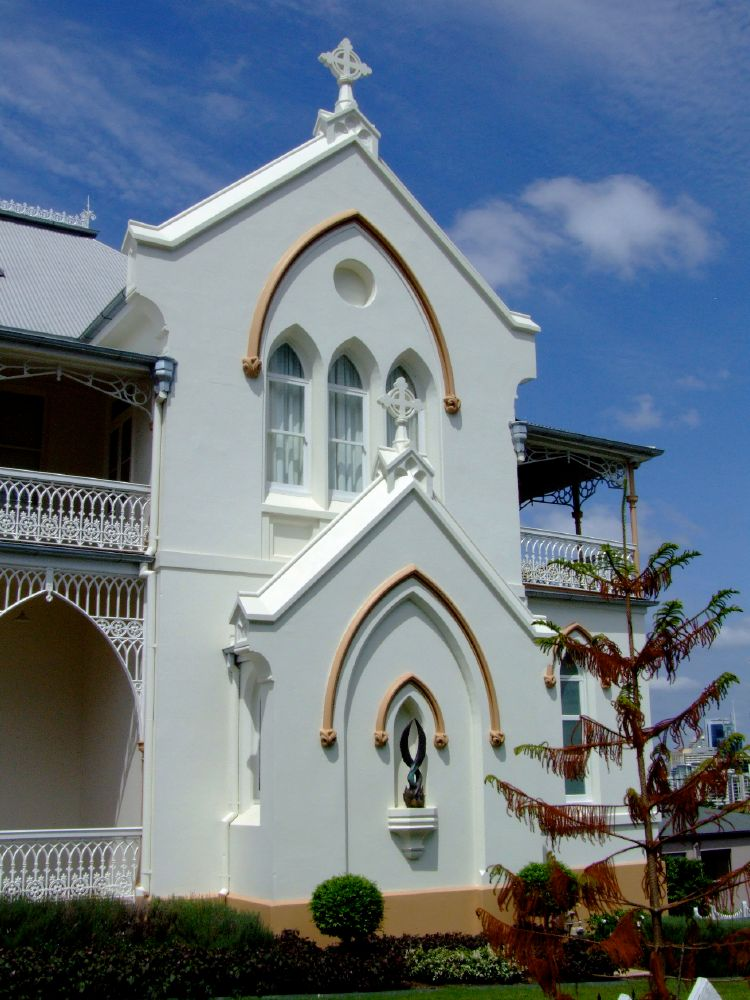
- Former St Brigid's Convent, 2009

- Location within Queensland
- Interactive map of St Brigid's Convent (former), Red Hill

Monastery information
- Other names: Convent of the Annunciation; Red Hill Convent (former)
- Order: Sisters of Mercy
- Denomination: Roman Catholic
- Established: 1923
- Disestablished: 1999
- Dedication: Saint Brigid
- Archdiocese: Brisbane

People
- Founder: Sisters of Mercy

Architecture
- Status: Convent (1923–1999); Private residence (since 2010)
- Functional status: Inactive; private residence
- Architect: Eaton & Bates
- Style: Gothic Revival
- Groundbreaking: 1902
- Completion date: 1923
- Closed: 1999

Site
- Location: 9–17 Upper Clifton Terrace, Red Hill, City of Brisbane, Queensland
- Country: Australia
- Coordinates: 27°27′24″S 153°00′42″E

Designations

Queensland Heritage Register
- Official name: St Brigid's Convent, Convent of the Annuciation, Red Hill Convent
- Type: State heritage (landscape, built)
- Designated: 28 March 2003
- Reference no.: 601078
- Significant period: 1900s–1920s (historical) ongoing (social); 1900s–1920s (fabric)
- Significant components: Chapel, views from, terracing, garden/grounds, views to, convent/nunnery

St Brigid's Convent is a heritage-listed former Roman Catholic convent at 9–17 Upper Clifton Terrace, Red Hill, City of Brisbane, Queensland, Australia. It was designed by Eaton & Bates and built from 1902 to 1923. It was also known as Convent of the Annunciation and Red Hill Convent. It was added to the Queensland Heritage Register on 28 March 2003.

The property was subdivided between 2004 and 2016 and the former convent is used as a private residence.

== History ==
St Brigid's Convent, Red Hill, was erected in 1902–03 for the Order of the Sisters of Mercy in Queensland, to a design by the architectural firm of Eaton and Bates. It occupies the site of an earlier, c. 1870s private residence known as Kenilworth.

The land on which the convent is situated was surveyed and alienated in 1865, as portions 608 and 609, parish of North Brisbane. At this period Red Hill was sparsely populated, the steepness of the hills deterring settlement initially, but from the 1870s, proximity to the town centre, the availability of cheap residential allotments in the valleys, and later the provision of a tram service through the district, encouraged residential development of the area. In 1877 the first St Brigid's Church was erected on the site of the present church on Musgrave Road. In 1881, Sisters of Mercy from All Hallow's Convent, Fortitude Valley, established a school at St Brigid's Church, travelling daily to Red Hill. The Sisters also undertook pastoral work in the Petrie Terrace-Red Hill district. On 9 June 1901, a new St Brigid's School was opened and blessed at Red Hill, adjacent to the Church, reflecting the expansion of residential settlement in the Red Hill district around the turn of the century.

Although portions 608 and 609, on which St Brigid's Convent was erected in the early 1900s, were subdivided almost immediately after purchase from the crown in 1865, and changed tenure from 1866, it is possible that the first development of the site only took place after all six subdivisions of portion 608, with frontages to both Upper and Lower Clifton Terrace, were acquired in 1873 by Lydia Pigott, widow of Gayndah grazier Peter John Pigott. In December 1874 Mrs Pigott married Brisbane broker and merchant, William Horsley, and they appear to have been resident at Kenilworth, on Mrs Horsley's property on Clifton Terrace, by 1876. Extensive terracing on portion 608, still evident on the ground, is likely to have been developed as part of the grounds of Kenilworth. In 1889 Lydia Horsley acquired title to an adjacent block, subdivision 11 of portion 609. The Horsleys resided at Kenilworth until c. 1900, and the house appears to have been rented out for several years prior to its acquisition by the Sisters of Mercy in May 1902, for the sum of £1610.

The Sisters commissioned architects Eaton and Bates of Brisbane, Rockhampton and Townsville, one of the more fashionable and prolific architectural firms of the day, to design their new convent. Sydney-trained architects George T Eaton and Albert Edmund Bates had formed a partnership in Rockhampton c. 1894 and developed a successful Central Queensland practice in the late 19th century, with branch offices established at Mount Morgan and Longreach by 1898, Clermont in 1900, Gladstone in 1901, Maryborough in 1902, and Townsville by 1902. Arthur B Polin of Sydney joined the partnership in Townsville c. 1901, as Eaton, Bates & Polin. Early in 1902 their head office was moved to Brisbane, with branches retained at Rockhampton and Townsville. A branch also operated briefly at Toowoomba in the early 1900s. They entered and won many architectural competitions around the turn of the century, and undertook a wide variety of work, from hotels and commercial buildings to residences, hospitals and masonic halls. One of their most glamorous commissions was for the new Queen's Hotel (1901–04) at Townsville, won in competition. Eaton and Bates received many commissions from the Catholic Church, including churches at Barcaldine, Gladstone and Donnybrook, convents and schools at Mount Morgan, Gladstone and Geraldton and a school at Toowong. The firm also supervised construction of St Joseph's Cathedral, Rockhampton and the Church of the Sacred Heart, Townsville (1896–1902) (now the Sacred Heart Cathedral). Their style was eclectic, drawing upon both eastern and western classical traditions, with a particular emphasis on verandahs and pavilions - both as a decorative device and as a response to the warm Queensland climate.

In mid-1902, Eaton and Bates called tenders for the erection and completion of brick convent buildings at Red Hill. Possibly initially known as the Convent of the Annunciation, the building was completed and occupied in 1903, with Sister M Thecla Kelleher, Head Teacher at St Brigid's School, as the first Superior. The building cost over £3100 to construct, and it was furnished in 1903 for a little over £500. At this period the north verandah was single-storeyed, a decorative picket fence defined the frontage of the property to Upper Clifton Terrace, and the front grounds contained several mature pines trees.

In mid-1906, the Sisters acquired title to several blocks adjacent to St Brigid's Convent: subdivision 10 of portions 615 & 616 (20.6 perches ) and subdivisions 12 & 13 of por 609 (36.2 perches), parish of North Brisbane, county of Stanley, from the estate of Alexander Fraser. Subdivisions 12 and 13 extended the convent grounds along Lower Clifton Terrace.

The northern upper floor verandah may have been added in 1923, when additions to the convent costing £1140 were carried out.

At its peak, St Brigid's Convent is likely to have accommodated 8 or 9 sisters, but no pupil boarders. The Sisters continued their pastoral work in the district, and in later years, several basement rooms and a small cottage in the backyard (since demolished) are understood to have been used as refuges or temporary accommodation for the homeless. Although St Brigid's School closed in the mid-1980s, several Sisters remained at St Brigid's Convent until the building was vacated by the Order in late 1999.

== Description ==
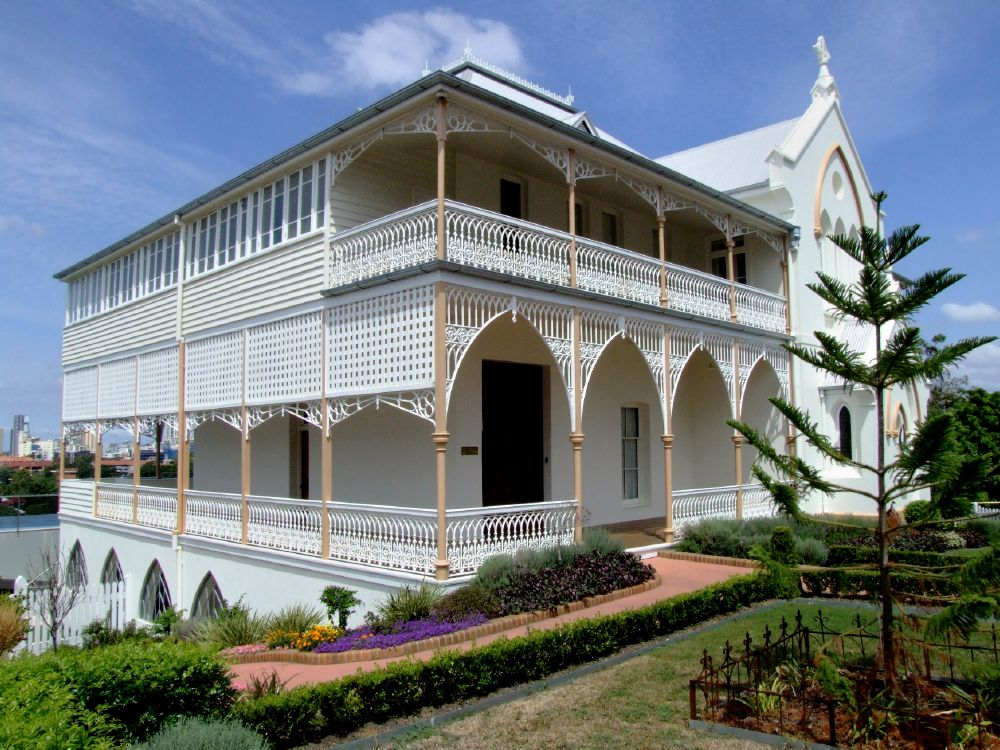
Former convent, 2009

St Brigid's Convent, located on the crest of Red Hill overlooking Brisbane city, is built into a sloping site which falls steeply between upper and lower Clifton Terrace. The building possesses strong landmark value, being a prominent element on the Red Hill skyline, and visible from Musgrave Road, which is a major arterial road. It fronts Upper Clifton Terrace to the west, and from the rear verandahs on the east; there is a magnificent vista over the city.

The building is two-storeyed with a substantial sub-storey or basement at the rear, and is of brick construction, rendered externally and plastered internally. It has a galvanised iron roof with small ventilation gablets, but early cast-iron cresting and finials have been removed.

Front and rear elevations each have a gabled projection on the southern end, which punctuate surrounding verandahs on two levels. The front gabled projection has three lancet windows on the upper level and on the lower level a further projection housing the chapel sanctuary; in this wall is a niche and statue, understood to be of Mary (Our Lady of the Annunciation). The rear gabled projection has a bank of three lancet windows on both ground and first levels.

The galvanised iron verandah roofs are separate to the main roof. The west (front) and south (side)verandahs have decorative cast iron columns, balustrade and valances on both levels, incorporating ecclesiastical motifs of lancet and rose windows in the designs. The east (rear) verandahs originally had a similar decoration to both levels, but the balustrade has been removed from the upper verandah, which has been enclosed with aluminium-framed windows. The north (side) verandah, which originally was single-storeyed, has the same decorative cast-iron work on the lower verandah, but the upper verandah is enclosed with c. 1920s weatherboards and timber casement windows. The basement level at the rear has a colonnade of lancet-shaped masonry arches.

The front entrance, set to one side, has surrounding leadlights and cedar panelling. It opens into a wide vestibule, separated from the hallway by a rounded arch infilled with a glass and timber screen and door. A door to the right opens from the vestibule into a small front parlour. Beyond the screen is the staircase leading to the upper floor, and a central hallway running off to the right in a north-south direction, which leads to the chapel and original dining room at the southern end of the ground floor. This hallway is broad and also gives access to another front parlour and to a former rear parlour with a fireplace. The latter room has been converted into a dining room, and the rear (south) wall of this has been opened to allow access to the enclosed rear verandah, which is now a kitchen.

The chapel has leadlight lancet windows along the south wall, and a lancet-shaped timber-panelled door which opens into a small vestry at the southwest end. The chapel is separated from the original dining room by folding timber (cedar) doors, which can be opened to extend the area of the chapel. There is a fine marble fireplace-surround with early tiles in the former dining room, and an early hearth and grate.

The ground floor partitions are of load-bearing brick, plastered and painted. This plan form, materials and finishing is mirrored on the first floor, but here, in addition, some rooms have been partitioned with vertically-jointed timber to create small bedrooms or "cells", and bathrooms, especially above the chapel wing. A tall arched opening in the north side wall leads from the upstairs central hallway onto the enclosed north verandah, which is a c. 1920s addition. This opening was originally a window, and evidence of this can be seen in the fabric.

A narrow timber service staircase in the northeast corner of the verandah links both the ground and first floors to the basement, which contains the original kitchen and pantries. An opening in the southern wall of the kitchen appears to be associated with the operation of an early "dumb waiter", from outside the kitchen to the verandah adjacent to the dining room above. Part of the basement colonnade at the southeast corner of the building has been enclosed as temporary accommodation, and part of the main pantry, which runs north-south for the width of the building and behind the kitchen, has been enclosed at the north end as a bathroom, which is accessed from the outside.

Joinery throughout is of cedar (some of which has been painted) and is substantial. The ground floor ceilings have pressed metal finishes, but the first floor ceilings are lined with narrow tongue and groove boards. The front parlours on the ground floor have step-out telescopic windows.

The building sits on the high ground of a large, mostly grassed terraced block, with several mature eucalypts on the lower ground near Lower Clifton Terrace, a small front garden adjacent to Upper Clifton Terrace, and some perimeter planting along the south side of the block. The Upper Clifton Terrace frontage has a late 20th century brick fence with an extruded pipe railing, and there is a small steel-framed and steel-roofed carport in the front yard, to the southwest of the convent building. Immediately behind the building are the brick and concrete foundations of a small outbuilding, demolished fairly recently. The terracing follows the steep slope of the land down the hill, at the rear of the building. One set of concrete terrace steps survives, but three other early sets of steps between the terraces have been removed.

== Heritage listing ==
St Brigid's Convent was listed on the Queensland Heritage Register on 28 March 2003 having satisfied the following criteria.

The place is important in demonstrating the evolution or pattern of Queensland's history.

St Brigid's Convent, erected in 1902–03, is important in illustrating the growth of Red Hill as a Brisbane dormitory suburb in the late 19th and early 20th centuries.

The place is important in demonstrating the principal characteristics of a particular class of cultural places.

St Brigid's Convent is a well-executed and largely intact example of a masonry Catholic convent of the late 19th/early 20th centuries, designed to take into account the warm Queensland climate. It demonstrates the principal characteristics of a convent building, reflecting a way of life for religious women that is now uncommon. It is a fine example of the ecclesiastical work of the important Queensland architectural firm of Eaton and Bates.

The place is important because of its aesthetic significance.

The place is significant also as one of a body of substantial Catholic buildings erected on prominent hilltop locations in Brisbane in the first half of the 20th century - a policy aimed at creating an identifiably impressive public image for the work of the Catholic Church in Queensland. The place retains its substantial original grounds - including terracing associated with earlier c. 1870s development of the site for residential purposes - and significant city vistas.

The place has a strong or special association with a particular community or cultural group for social, cultural or spiritual reasons.

It has social significance engendered by its aesthetic and landmark qualities, being a distinctive element of the Red Hill skyline for nearly a century, and contributing strongly to the complex "historical character" of the suburb.

The place has a special association with the life or work of a particular person, group or organisation of importance in Queensland's history.

The place is significant also for its special association with the work of the Sisters of Mercy in Queensland, in particular their important educational and pastoral work in the Red Hill-Petrie Terrace district from the early 1880s.

== See also ==
- St Brigid's Church, Red Hill
