= Warriston, Red Hill =

Warriston
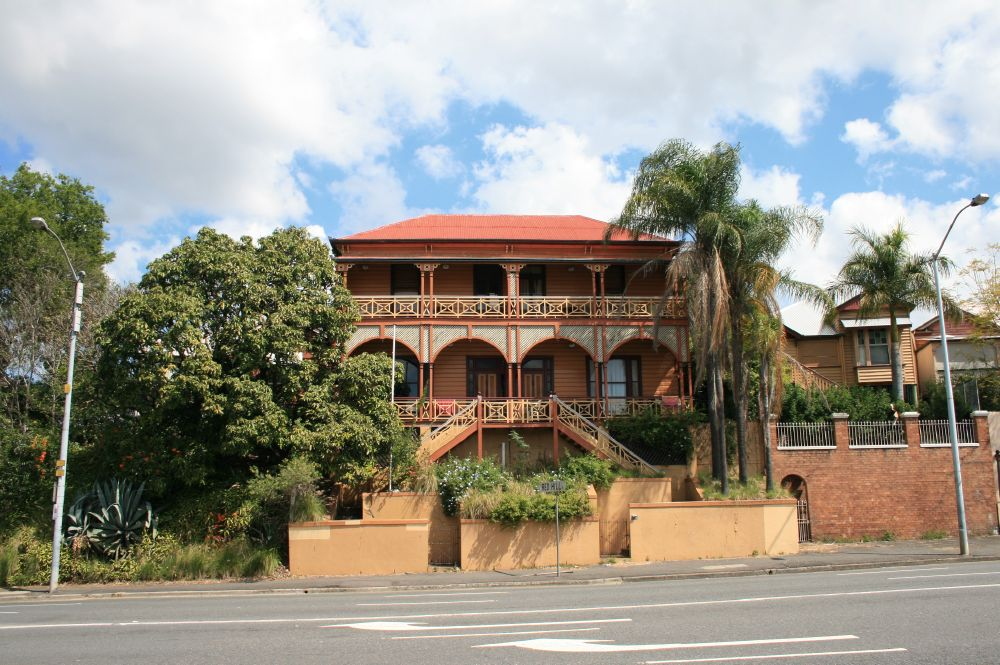
- Warriston, 2008

- Location within Queensland Location within Australia
- 27.4596°S 153.0139°E
- Location: 6–8 Musgrave Road, Red Hill, City of Brisbane, Queensland, Australia

History
- Design period: 1870s–1890s (late 19th century)
- Built: c. 1886

Queensland Heritage Register
- Official name: Warriston, Berley Flats
- Type: state heritage (built)
- Designated: 21 October 1992
- Reference no.: 600276
- Significant period: 1880s (fabric, historical)
- Significant components: residential accommodation – maisonette/s / duplex, service wing, wall/s – retaining

Warriston is a heritage-listed duplex at 6–8 Musgrave Road, Red Hill, City of Brisbane, Queensland, Australia. It was built c. 1886. It is also known as Berley Flats. It was added to the Queensland Heritage Register on 21 October 1992.

== History ==
Warriston was built c. 1886 for David Pringle Milne, a Brisbane west ward alderman from 1870 to 1876, retired boot and shoe importer/manufacturer, and proprietor of the Glasgow Boot and Shoe Mart in Queen Street. The semi-detached houses may have been named after Warriston, a northern district of Glasgow.

In 1866 and 1874 Milne had acquired two blocks of land fronting Petrie Terrace (renamed Musgrave Road in 1888), and was recorded as resident on the site from the late 1860s. The kitchen houses attached to the present Warriston may be the original Milne residence.

The Milnes occupied No. 2 Warriston (the northern house and closest to the corner of Earle Street and Musgrave Road) until David Milne's death in 1897, while the other side was let to a succession of middle class occupants. These included surveyors WM Davidson and CT Bedford, Albert E Harte (a prominent Queen-street stock and share broker), and Captain James C O'Brien of the Queensland Defence Force. During the 1890s a private school operated in Warriston No. 1. From the 1910s Warriston served as a boarding house, and in the second half of the 20th century was converted into twelve flats (known as Berley Flats), the verandahs being enclosed and the exterior sheeted with asbestos-cement and stucco.

In 1986–88 new owners undertook a careful restoration and recycling project to convert the semi-detached houses (at that time still flats) into offices.

== Description ==
Warriston stands on the crest above the Normanby Fiveways, on the edge of the suburb of Petrie Terrace. The building is associated visually with the Normanby Hotel, and together these buildings frame the view of the city from Musgrave Road.

Warriston comprises a pair of two-storeyed, semi-detached timber residences with verandahs on both levels, front and back. They are surmounted by a corrugated iron roof with a single hip to the front, but with a divided roof to the rear. Separated by a brick party wall which does not rise above the roofline, from the street, the two houses appear as a single entity.

A double staircase with a cross-braced timber balustrade leads to the first level, which is high set at the front. Decorative timber detailing to the front verandahs includes cross-braced balustrades with central rosettes, deep valances on the first level, and double posts with capitals and brackets. The rear verandahs have been enclosed.

The side windows, which are sashed, are shaded by galvanised iron hoods with timber fretwork infill and curved timber brackets.

Each house is a mirror reflection of the other, with the front door opening into a long hall along the brick party wall. This hall is broken into two sections by an arched screen, with the stairway rising from the rear.

The core of each house consists of a pair of reception rooms separated by folding doors on the ground floor, and three bedrooms and a bathroom upstairs, both levels opening onto the verandahs front and back.

The kitchens are located in a single-storeyed, low-set, timber building attached at the rear. It is square in shape with a short-ridged roof of corrugated iron and verandahs to either end.

Although the former houses now function as offices, the fabric and structure are largely intact. Paint analysis has permitted repainting to the original colours.

The building is one of few 19th century semi-detached houses surviving in Brisbane, and is even rarer for its timber construction.

== Heritage listing ==
Warriston was listed on the Queensland Heritage Register on 21 October 1992 having satisfied the following criteria.

The place is important in demonstrating the evolution or pattern of Queensland's history.

Historically it is significant in illustrating the pattern of development of Petrie Terrace, one of the earliest suburbs of Brisbane.

The place is important in demonstrating the principal characteristics of a particular class of cultural places.

Warriston, erected c. 1886, is significant as a rare, intact timber example of the 19th century semi-detached house form in Brisbane, and in particular of the common-roof type.

The place is important because of its aesthetic significance.

It is important for its aesthetic contribution to the Petrie Terrace/Red Hill townscape, and for the quality of its restoration and recycling, demonstrating that 19th century form and 20th century function can be compatible.
