= Gympie State High School buildings =

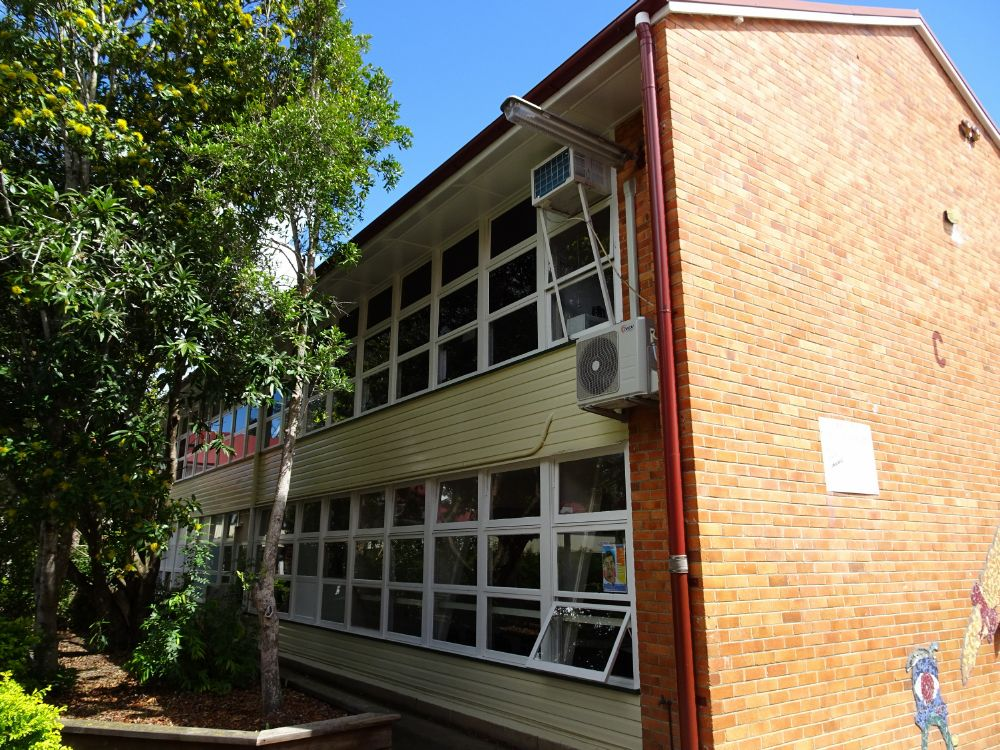
- Block C, 2018

- Location within Queensland
- 26.1888°S 152.6794°E
- Location: 1 Everson Road, Gympie, Gympie Region, Queensland, Australia

History
- Design period: 1919–1930s (Interwar period)
- Built: 1933–1937, 1951, 1955–1956, 1956–1957, 1958–1959, 1960–1961

Queensland Heritage Register
- Official name: Gympie State High School
- Type: state heritage
- Designated: 21 September 2018
- Reference no.: 650064
- Type: Education, Research, Scientific Facility: School – state (high)
- Theme: Educating Queenslanders: Providing secondary education

Gympie State High School buildings are a heritage-listed group of buildings at Gympie State High School at 1 Everson Road, Gympie, Gympie Region, Queensland, Australia. They were built from 1933 to 1937. They were added to the Queensland Heritage Register on 21 September 2018.

== History ==
Gympie State High School, established in 1912, opened on its current site in Gympie in 1917. The school is important in demonstrating the evolution of state education and its associated architecture. It retains:

- two timber school buildings with timber floor trusses (Block B, 1955–56, and Block C, 1956–57)
- a timber school building with open web steel floor trusses (Block D, 1958–59) and its Agricultural Science extension (1960–61)
- a former partially enclosed gymnasium (Block K, c. 1933–1937)
- a temporary classroom building (Block T, 1951).

The school has a strong and ongoing association with the Gympie community.

Gympie, part of the traditional lands of the Kabi Kabi people, was established after the discovery of gold in October 1867. The alluvial gold was soon exhausted and shallow reef mining commenced in 1868, followed by deep reef mining from 1875. During 1881 Gympie's mines began yielding large amounts of gold. An intensive phase of underground reef mining followed, facilitated by the injection of capital into mining companies for machinery and employees. Local gold production peaked in 1903, and Gympie was declared a city in 1905. As gold production declined to cessation c. 1927, Gympie was transformed into a service centre for its highly productive agricultural district, noted for dairy farming and fruit-growing.

By 1912, Gympie had four state primary schools: Gympie Central State School (1869), One Mile State School (1869), Monkland State School (1884) and Southside State School (1910). That year, it also became the site of one of Queensland's first three state high schools. The Grammar Schools Act 1860 had provided scholarships for high-achieving students to attend elite grammar schools, but it was not until 1912 that the government instituted a high school system. In late January 1912 state high schools opened in Gympie, Warwick, and Bundaberg; followed a week later by high schools in Mackay, Mount Morgan and Charters Towers. In the 1950s the number of high schools in Queensland increased significantly.

In January 1912, Gympie State High School's first students were accommodated in a building at Gympie Central State School. This building was soon overcrowded. In 1914 the Gympie City Council donated 7.55 hectares (18.7 acres) of land, known as Tozer Park, for a new high school. This land (Portion 19, R670) was located west of Cootharaba Road and south of Tozer Park Road. An additional 4.01 hectares (9.9 acres) of land (Portion 21, R689) was then obtained just north of Tozer Park, to provide level ground on which to site the school building.

The first two purpose-built high school buildings in Queensland were opened at Gatton and then Gympie in 1917, and were larger versions of a standard design introduced for primary schools in 1914. To help ensure consistency and economy, the Queensland Government developed standard plans for its school buildings. These were continually refined in response to changing needs and educational philosophy.

Construction of the new Gympie State High School occurred between August 1916 and May 1917. Classes commenced on 3 September 1917 and the highset timber school building was officially opened on 19 October 1917, during Gympie's 50th anniversary celebrations, with an enrolment of 146 students. A separate carpenter's workshop and store (the manual training building) was located south of the school building.

Gympie State High School's facilities were improved in the 1920s and 1930s. A caretaker's residence was built in 1920; and the first school oval (in 2018 named Hangar Oval), was constructed through the fundraising efforts of the school's Sports Committee, and officially opened in 1931.

The grounds of purpose-built high schools were larger than those of primary schools, being over 4.8 hectares (12 acres), and provided ample room for sports facilities. For many years school committees had to raise funds for construction of such facilities, which included tennis courts, gymnasiums and swimming pools. Teachers in the 1950s requested that high schools include gymnasiums, but these did not become a standard design or inclusion until after the 1960s.

Gymnasiums were regarded in the late 19th century by Victorian society as a way to maintain physical fitness and beauty, and pursue self-improvement (and Muscular Christianity) in the industrial age. Typical gymnasium equipment included ropes and rings; parallel bars, horizontal and sloping ladders, wooden horses and mats. Gymnasiums were provided at Queensland state schools, where the community could afford them, from the late 1870s. Tenders were invited, or fundraising was in progress for, gymnasiums at Sherwood State School (1878, fundraising), Fortitude Valley (1879), Lytton (1886), North Bundaberg (1886), Ingham (1888, tender for a playshed and a gymnasium), "South East" Bundaberg (1891), the Central State School for Girls in Brisbane (1899, for a playshed and a gymnasium), Cordalba (1910, a playshed combined with a gymnasium), and Goondiwindi (1917, fundraising). Some schools had gymnasium equipment in their playsheds.

A gymnasium was built at Gympie State High School in the 1930s. In 1933 the school's Sports Committee planned to erect, with their own funds, a "partially enclosed sports shelter shed", that could be used as a gymnasium and for social functions (with a preliminary estimated cost of £260), and the Committee requested design assistance and building supervision from the Department of Public Works. This was approved in July 1933 and the gymnasium was built sometime before its gymnastic equipment was installed in 1937. The gymnasium (in 2018 named Block K) accommodated Intermediate classes during the school day - Gympie having become a High and Intermediate School in 1933 - and was used as a gymnasium during lunchtime and after school.

Due to increased student numbers, there were soon other additions to the school. During 1939 and early 1940 the manual training building was extended to the east, and a new domestic science block was erected to its northwest. Additions were also made to the main school building. During World War II (WWII), slit trenches were dug on the school grounds in early 1942, in case of air raids. Letters in 1942 discussed the difficulty of digging trenches in the stony ground of the school. Waste water from the Domestic Science building also drained into one of the trenches. Other trenches were located north of the main building, adjacent to Tozer Park Road.

After World War II, enrolment at the school increased above the previous peak of 327 students, resulting in further buildings. Two were added to the school in the late 1940s-early 1950s. The first was a War Memorial Pavilion, sited on the north side of Hangar Oval, which was opened on 27 August 1949 by the Queensland Governor, Sir John Lavarack (the pavilion was demolished in 2010).

The second new building was a two-room temporary classroom building with a gabled roof (in 2018 named Block T). This was built between the main building and the domestic science block in early 1951, and was initially used for commercial classes. Only a relatively small number of temporary classroom buildings were constructed between 1943 and 1951. This standard type, of which Block T in Gympie is a good example, was introduced as a temporary solution to the exceptional growth in student numbers during WWII and the immediate post-war period, when skilled labour was scarce and materials were in short supply. They were small timber buildings, lowset on concrete posts and had skillion or gabled roofs. External walls were clad with vertical tongue and groove (T&G) timber boards and the rear wall had casement windows with operable fanlights sheltered by a simple hood. Accessed from a verandah, the type comprised two classrooms 21 by 18 feet (6.4 by 5.5 m).

During the early 1950s the gymnasium continued to be multi-purpose, being used for Intermediate school assemblies and singing; folk dancing and choir practice for High and Intermediate students; as a shelter shed on wet days; for verse speaking, concerts, drama, the annual flower show, and entertaining visiting sports teams.

By May 1954 there were 259 Intermediate and 255 High School students attending the school, with one Intermediate class using the gymnasium. However, on the night of 18 May 1955 the main school building burnt down due to fire breaking out in a chemistry room. Firefighters had no water pressure to fight the blaze, as the mains over the Mary River had been carried away in floods two months previously. Ironically, the need for fire extinguishers in chemistry laboratories at Queensland's high schools had recently been dismissed by the Brisbane Metropolitan Fire Brigade and the Assistant Superintendent of Secondary Education, due to the supposed low risk of fire. As a result, the surviving buildings had to be used for general classes. The gymnasium was enclosed to form three classrooms and a laboratory. The temporary classroom building was moved to the south of, and between, the manual training and domestic science blocks, to allow for the construction of new school buildings. The Intermediate students were temporarily transferred to the Central State School.

Plans were also drawn for two new classroom blocks (in 2018 named Blocks B and C) and an administration wing (demolished in the 1970s) in 1955. These were constructed in three stages between 1955 and 1958, and formed a "U" shape, open to the northeast. Block B was built between late 1955 and early 1956, and Block C between mid-1956 and early 1957, with the concrete stairway between them ready for pouring in November 1956. The Administration building was nearing completion in December 1957 (demolished 1973). An assembly area, which is still an open space in 2018, was formed between the new buildings, occupying the site of the destroyed 1917 school building.

From 1950 the Department of Public Instruction introduced and developed new standard plans for school buildings. These buildings were timber-framed structures with a gable roof, highset on stumps, and the understorey was used as covered play space. Classrooms opened off the northern verandah and had extensive areas of windows. In 1954 the type was improved by replacing the proliferation of stumps with a timber truss that spanned the width of the classroom and provided an unimpeded play space. This concept was further refined in 1957 by replacing the timber truss with a steel open-web joist, supported on reinforced concrete columns.

Block B, a timber school building with timber floor trusses (1955–56), was used for high school students and had seven classrooms on the first floor, all with double doors to the northern verandah, and four of the classrooms were separated by three sets of folding doors; with the seventh classroom, at the southeast end, separated from the other classrooms by a cloak room. The understorey of Block B included, from the northwest end: a store and girls lavatories; an open recreation and assembly area; a commercial room; medical services room, switch room and store.

Block C, which extended northeast from, and perpendicular to, the northwest end of Block B, was also a timber school building with timber floor trusses (1956–57) and was used for Intermediate students on the first floor, and High School students on the ground floor. It had a drawing room at the southwest end of the first floor; then a library and reading room; and an Intermediate staff room, with an enclosed corridor along the northwest side of the building. The ground floor included, from the southwest end: a science lecture room; a physics lab; two store rooms; and a chemistry lab. Blocks B and C were connected by a concrete and brick stairwell to both levels, and also had brick end walls as fire stops (northwest end of Block B; both ends of Block C). The drawing room and library were initially used as three temporary classrooms. By 1982 the chemistry lab and storeroom had been condemned and were being used for storage, with the rest of the floor used for art and a normal classroom. The high quality of the buildings was recognised at the time and Blocks B and C were chosen as examples of notable High School architecture in "Buildings of Queensland", a 1959 publication recording Queensland's architecture produced by the state chapter of the Royal Australian Institute of Architects.

The one-storey Administration Block (c. 1957), which extended northeast from, and perpendicular to, the southeast end of Block B, was connected to the latter by a covered way which also provided an entrance from Cootharaba Road.

As the new buildings were completed, classes moved there from the older school buildings. By 1957, the temporary classroom building was being used to store library books and as a boys locker room, since there was a new commercial room under Block B. Later, the temporary classroom building became a storeroom for the groundskeeper. However, the gymnasium continued to host classes until the late 1970s, when it was again used as a gymnasium for a period.

The school also gained a classroom block for Intermediate students (in 2018 named Block D), east of the northern end of Block C. The first section of Block D, constructed after May 1958 and occupied in 1959, included four classrooms on the first floor, each with double doors to the northern verandah, which had a metal-sheeted balustrade and a separate roof with clerestory windows above. The west end of the building was brick. The understorey contained an open play area, under open web steel trusses which were supported on lozenge shaped concrete columns. Three more classrooms were added to the east end of Block D after November 1958, while a brick Boys toilet block, with lockers and showers, was added at the west end of the understorey. By 1982, a passageway had replaced part of the second classroom from the east end.

In 1960–61, a two-storey Agricultural Science wing was added north of the east end of Block D. This gable-roofed timber-framed building, with open web steel trusses and brick end walls, was linked to Block D on both levels by a covered glass and metal covered way. On the ground floor, from the south, it included: a store room, work and machinery room; and change room. On the first floor was a store room and a classroom opening off the western verandah. Although the ground floor machinery room was intended to house a tractor, regulations against tractors being stored under school buildings prevented this use.

During the 1960s, a number of new buildings were added to the school, resulting in the gymnasium being relocated further south - due to the construction of a two-storey senior science block (Block J). Around 1962, a tuckshop was added under the east end of block D, and in 1967 the temporary classroom building was still being used as a library. The school grounds also expanded in the 1960s, extending northeast to Bachelor Road in 1962, and Tozer Park Road was incorporated into the school grounds in 1964. A new sports field, Willow Oval, was formed to the south of Hangar Oval c. 1961, and a 10 hectare agricultural plot, located opposite the school on Cootharaba Road, was cleared and fenced by 1965. By 1965 the school taught 1,036 high school students.

Continued development during the 1970s meant that the temporary classroom building was relocated further west, due to construction of a three-storey classroom block (Block H), which also resulted in the old vocational buildings being moved southwards (the domestic science block was demolished soon after). In the same decade the easternmost classroom of Block B was removed when a new two-storey administration block (Block A) replaced the 1950s administration block. The vocational buildings had been moved southwards by 1971. The domestic science building was gone by 1974. New buildings continued to be added to the school during the 1980s and 1990s.

Changes also occurred to the older buildings in the 1980s. The internal partitioning of the 1930s gymnasium was reconfigured c. 1987, to change it from one large and two small rooms (at the east end), to two large classrooms, each with a smaller partitioned space in the southern corner. During the late 1980s the southern edge of the school grounds, adjacent to Station Road, was excised as a park, and by 2018 the school grounds covered 11.04 hectares (27.3 acres).

In 2018, the school continues to operate from its 1917 site. It retains its two timber school buildings with timber floor trusses (Blocks B and C); and a timber school building with open web steel floor trusses (Block D) with an Agricultural Science extension; the former gymnasium (Block K); and a temporary classroom building (Block T). Gympie State High School is important to Gympie, as generations of students, from Gympie and nearby rural areas, have been taught there. School histories were compiled for the school's 60th anniversary in 1982, and its 100th anniversary in 2012.

== Description ==
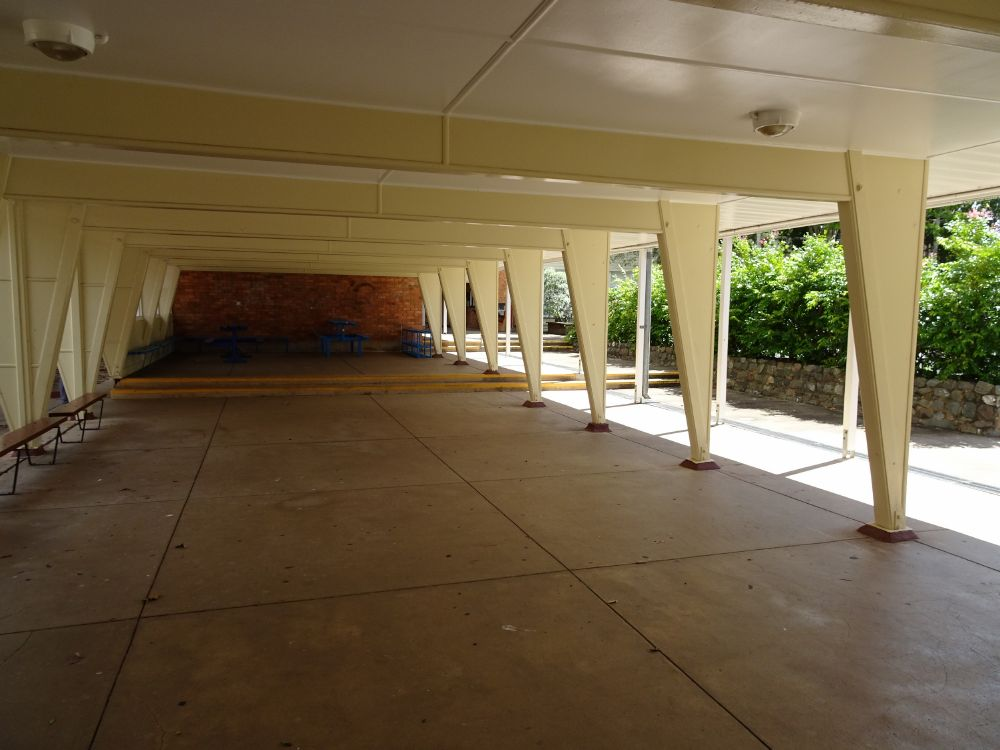
Block B understorey, looking north-west, 2018

Gympie State High School occupies an 11.04ha sloping, elevated site, bounded by Cootharaba Road, a main thoroughfare heading out of Gympie, to the east; and Everson Road to the west. The school's buildings are clustered in the northern half of the site, with two sports ovals to the south, and one oval to the north.

Features of state level cultural heritage significance are:

- Timber School building incorporating timber floor trusses (Block B)
- Timber School building incorporating timber floor trusses (Block C)
- Timber School building incorporating steel open web floor trusses (Block D)
- Timber School building incorporating steel open web floor trusses (Agricultural Science extension to Block D)
- Gymnasium (Block K)
- Temporary Classroom Building (Block T)

=== Block B, Block C, Block D & its Agricultural Science extension ===
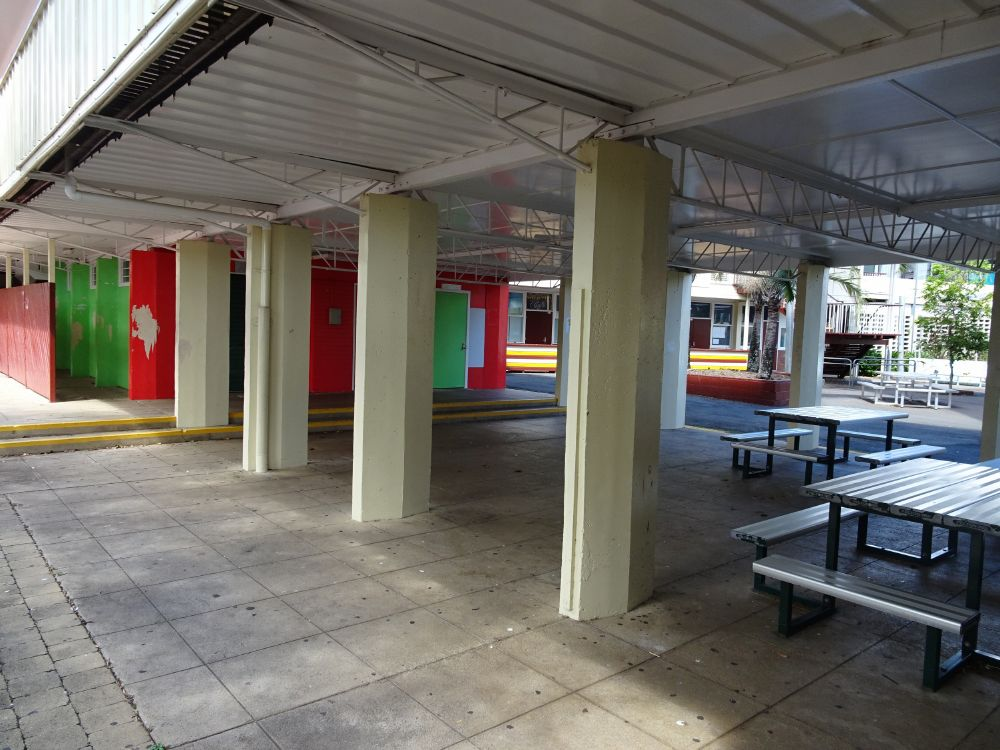
Block D understorey, looking south-east, 2018

These highset timber-framed and -clad classroom buildings incorporate floor trusses supporting the first floor to provide an open ground floor for covered play or classrooms. They have gable roofs clad with corrugated metal sheets and are positioned around a broad open courtyard. Long verandahs provide access to a series of classrooms and the verandah and opposing classroom walls are highly glazed, providing a high level of natural light and ventilation to the interiors. The buildings are divided into regular, repeated structural bays defined by their trusses and the short, gable ends of the buildings have face brick extending across both levels.

=== Block K (former gymnasium) ===
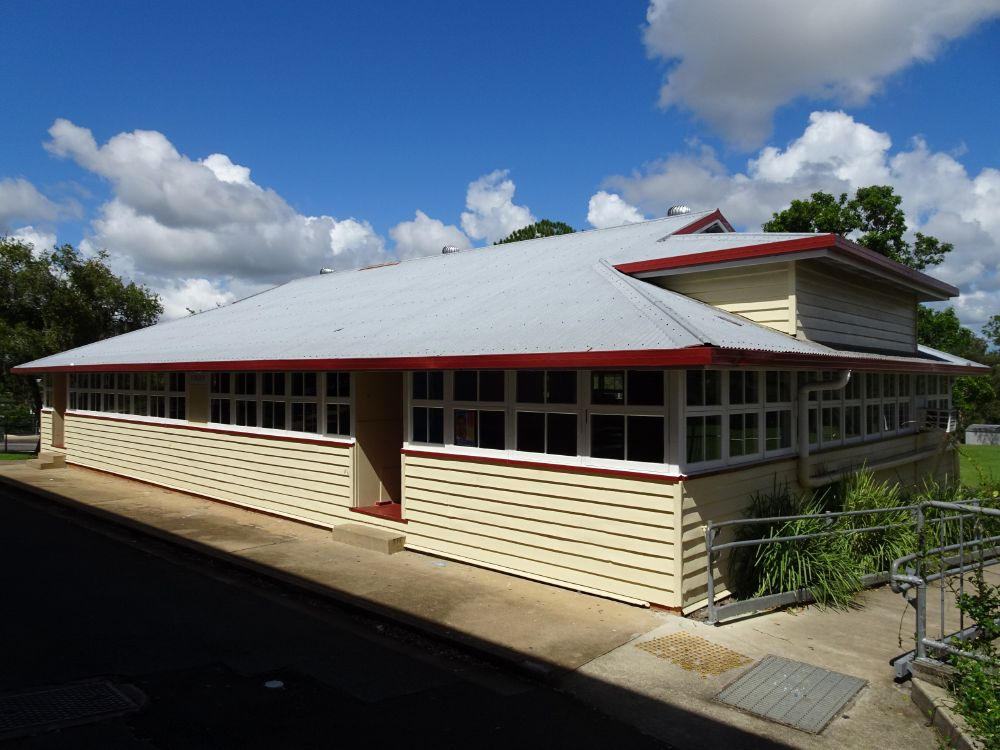
Block K, north-east elevation (left) and northern corner, 2018

Block K is a one-storey rectangular lowset building. Its walls are clad to sill height with weatherboards and it has a gambrel roof clad with corrugated metal sheets. The gablets have fixed metal ventilation louvres and a weatherboard-clad windowless dormer rises out of the roof at the west end of the building producing a taller internal area.

The roof is supported by 12 sturdy timber posts standing within the building.

=== Block T (temporary classroom building) ===
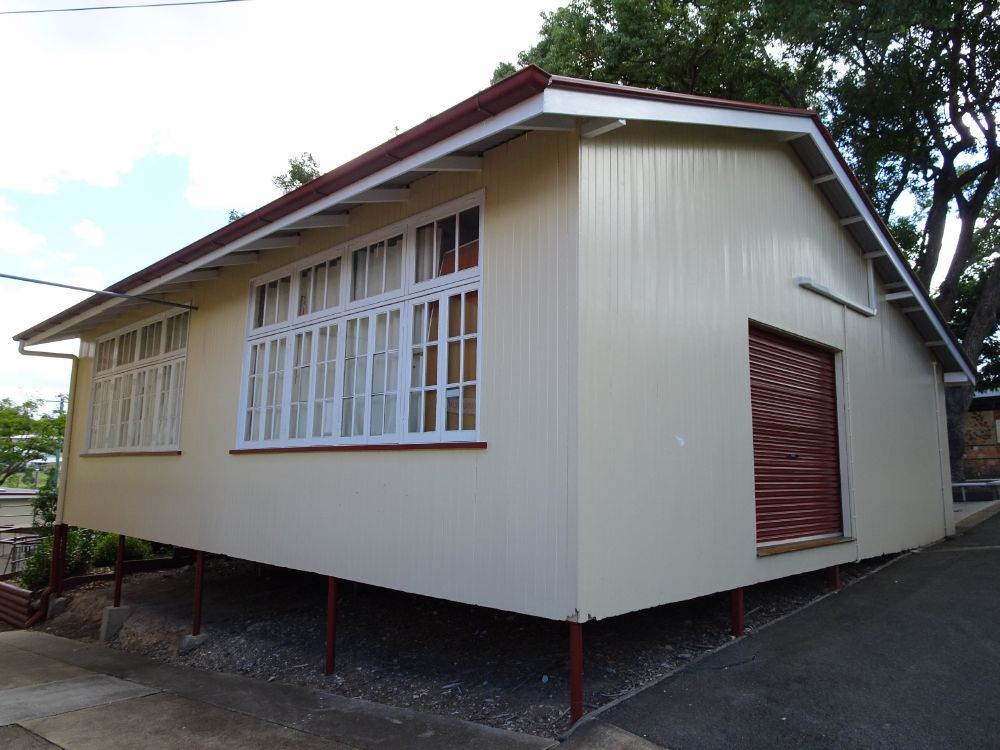
Block T, south-west (to left) and south-east elevations, 2018

Block T is a one-storey rectangular lowset building. Its walls are clad with timber vertical jointed (VJ) boards with no bottom plate and it has a gable roof clad with corrugated metal sheets. A verandah runs along the north side (front) with hatroom enclosures at either end.

Originally comprising two classrooms, the partition has been removed to make one large space, although a bulkhead remains.

== Heritage listing ==
Gympie State High School was listed on the Queensland Heritage Register on 21 September 2018 having satisfied the following criteria.

The place is important in demonstrating the evolution or pattern of Queensland's history.

Gympie State High School (established as one of Queensland's first high schools in 1912, and opened on current site in 1917) is important in demonstrating the evolution of state education and its associated architecture in Queensland. It retains excellent, representative examples of buildings that were responses to prevailing government educational philosophies.

The two timber school buildings with timber floor trusses (1955–56, 1956–57), and the two timber school buildings with open web steel floor trusses (1958–59, 1960–61), represent the evolution of Department of Public Works designs during the mid to late 1950s to allow for unimpeded play space under highset timber school buildings.

The temporary classroom building (1951) is a product of the exceptional growth in student numbers after World War II, when skilled labour was scarce and materials were in short supply. It is a good, representative example of this pattern of development.

The former gymnasium (c. 1933-37), which was later used as classrooms, represents the emphasis on sport and fitness at Queensland state schools, and the early pattern of local communities having to raise the funds required to provide sports facilities.

The place is important in demonstrating the principal characteristics of a particular class of cultural places.

The timber school buildings with timber floor trusses (Blocks B and C) and the timber school buildings with open web steel floor trusses (Block D and its Agricultural Science extension) are good, intact examples of their type and demonstrate two iterations of the Department of Public Work's standard designs: incorporating timber floor trusses for unimpeded play space under the classrooms, and later using open web steel trusses to achieve the same effect.

The buildings retain their: highset character with timber or open web steel trusses; gable roofs; face brick walls and crimped metal sheet and chamferboard cladding; verandahs for circulation; timber-framed double hung windows (Blocks B, C and D), or metal-framed glass louvres (Agricultural Science extension) to the verandah; timber-framed pivoting clerestory windows above the verandah roof (Blocks B and D); large banks of timber-framed awning windows with timber framed pivot fanlights on the opposing walls; and 24 ft (7.3 m) wide classrooms (Blocks B, C and D).

The temporary classroom building is an intact example of its type. It retains: its gable roof (characteristic of 1949–51 examples); lowset timber-framed structure; north facing verandah; timber sash windows to the verandah; casement windows with fanlights over; vertical jointed (VJ) board cladding; and a bulkhead indicates the position of the original wall between its two 21 ft × 18 ft (6.4 m × 5.5 m) classrooms.

The place has a strong or special association with a particular community or cultural group for social, cultural or spiritual reasons.

Schools have always played an important part in Queensland communities. They typically retain significant and enduring connections with former pupils, parents, and teachers; provide a venue for social interaction and volunteer work; and are a source of pride, symbolising local progress and aspirations. The former gymnasium is the result of community fundraising efforts to provide sporting facilities for Gympie children.

Gympie State High School has a strong and ongoing association with the Gympie and district community. The school was opened on its current site in 1917 and generations of Gympie children have been taught there.
