= Cross Terrace =

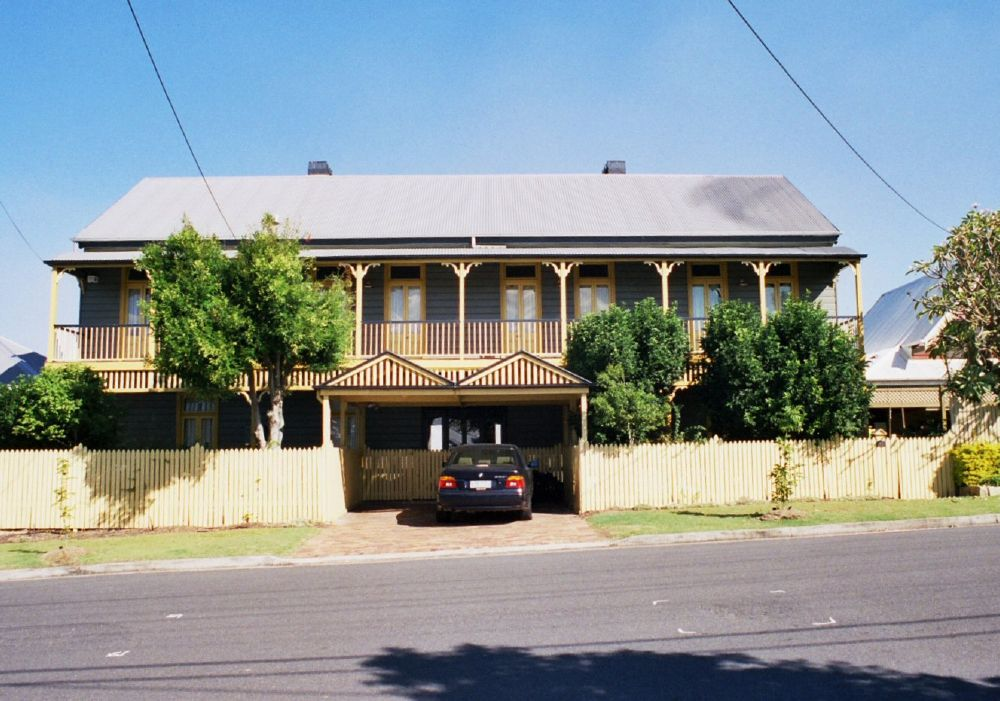

- Location within Queensland Location within Australia
- 27.4587°S 153.0081°E
- Location: 44–50 Cairns Terrace, Paddington, City of Brisbane, Queensland, Australia

History
- Design period: 1870s–1890s (late 19th century)
- Built: c. 1887–c. 1888

Queensland Heritage Register
- Official name: Cross Terrace, Cairns Terrace
- Type: state heritage (built)
- Designated: 21 October 1992
- Reference no.: 600285
- Significant period: 1880s (fabric, historical)
- Significant components: basement / sub-floor, views to, attic, views from, residential accommodation – terrace house/terrace

Cross Terrace is a heritage-listed terrace house at 44–50 Cairns Terrace, Paddington (formerly within Red Hill), City of Brisbane, Queensland, Australia. It was built from c. 1887 to c. 1888. It is also known as Cairns Terrace. It was added to the Queensland Heritage Register on 21 October 1992.

== History ==
This former row of four, two-storeyed timber houses was erected in 1887–88 on newly subdivided land purchased by Joseph Cross, a printer or machinist in the Government Printing Office, in late 1886. He was resident at the terrace by 1888.

The buildings were erected at the height of the 1880s economic boom. Possibly because of the Undue Subdivision of Land Prevention Act 1885, which prevented individual row houses from being sold on separate titles, the Cross family occupied at least two of the houses originally, and what might otherwise have been built as cheap rental accommodation was larger in scale and more decorative in appearance than usual. Many other inner suburban multiple dwellings were built in timber during the 1880s, but most either were single-storeyed or semi-detached. Its construction reflected also the growing acceptance of timber and corrugated iron in more prestigious dwellings.

Each house comprised six main rooms on four levels: front room and parlour at street level; two bedrooms on the first floor; an attic room; and a kitchen beneath the rear half of each house. The exterior walls were clad with chamferboards and the single gabled roof with corrugated iron, while the interior was lined with lath and plaster. The double verandahs with curved iron roofs to front and back were decorated with cast-iron fringes and balustrades and a decorative timber frieze to the front. Four semi-circular dormer windows with scalloped bargeboards faced the street.

In the 1890s three of the four houses were known as Keira, Mascotte and Kiama.

Cross retained possession of the houses until 1910, during which time white collar, craft and business persons were predominant occupants. After 1945 the building was converted into flats, with the verandahs boarded and louvered to provide modern kitchens and bathrooms. In the 1980s the buildings were renovated and converted into a single house.

== Description ==
Cross Terrace is located on a ridge road in central Paddington, and is visible from many Paddington vantage points to the south. It is set close to the street alignment at the front and is the most prominent dwelling in a street lined with traditional housing.

It is a two-storeyed, timber framed and clad building with a gabled roof and double verandahs to front and back.

Little remains of the original interior except the fireplaces. The ground floor has been converted into kitchen, dining, sitting, music and bathrooms and the first floor into bedrooms, around a wide open two-level gallery connected by a new central staircase.

French doors opening to the front verandahs have been retained, but the plain stick balusters and frieze on the verandahs are recent, and the dormers have been removed. A double carport with twin gables is located in the centre front.

Despite these changes the gabled, four level form remains intact, as well as the main openings and chimneystacks.

== Heritage listing ==
Cross Terrace was listed on the Queensland Heritage Register on 21 October 1992 having satisfied the following criteria.

The place is important in demonstrating the evolution or pattern of Queensland's history.

Cross Terrace is significant for its association with the closer settlement of the Red Hill/Paddington area in the 1880s.

The place demonstrates rare, uncommon or endangered aspects of Queensland's cultural heritage.

Cross Terrace is significant as the only known evidence of the late 19th century two-storeyed timber terrace house type to survive in Brisbane.

The place is important because of its aesthetic significance.

Cross Terrace is significant as a local landmark and for its contribution to the streetscape along Cairns Terrace.
