= St Brigid's Church, Red Hill =

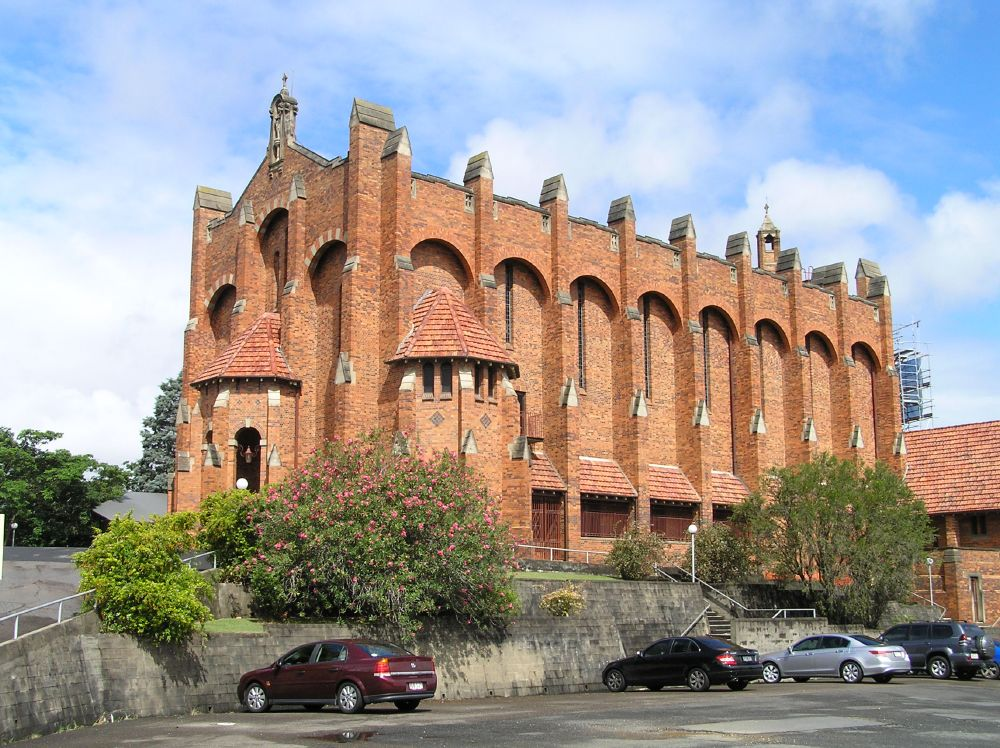
- St Brigid's Church, 2009
- St Brigid's Church, Red Hill
- 27°27′27″S 153°00′37″E
- Address: 78 Musgrave Road, Red Hill, City of Brisbane, Queensland
- Country: Australia
- Denomination: Roman Catholic
- Website: www.jubileeparish.com

History
- Status: Church
- Dedication: Saint Brigid
- Dedicated: 9 August 1914 by Archbishop James Duhig

Architecture
- Functional status: Active
- Architect: Robin Dods
- Architectural type: Church
- Style: Arts and Crafts
- Years built: 1912–1914

Specifications
- Materials: Brick

Administration
- Archdiocese: Brisbane
- Parish: Jubilee

Clergy
- Priest: Fr Gerry Kalinowski
- Pastor: Fr Tony Girvan

Queensland Heritage Register
- Official name: St Brigids Church
- Type: State heritage (built)
- Designated: 21 October 1992
- Reference no.: 600284
- Significant period: 1912–1914 (fabric)
- Significant components: Furniture/fittings, pipe organ, stained glass window/s
- Builders: Thomas Keenan

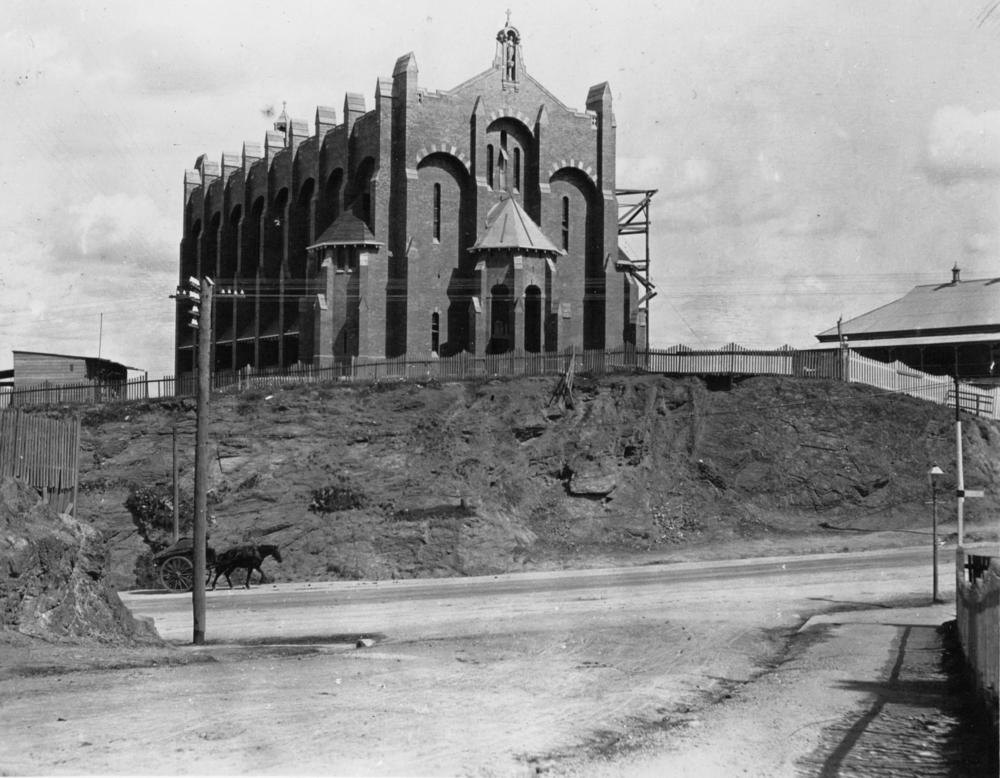
Construction of St Brigid's Church, Red Hill, Brisbane, 1914

St Brigid's Church is a heritage-listed Roman Catholic church located at 78 Musgrave Road, Red Hill, City of Brisbane, Queensland, Australia. It was designed by Robin Dods and built from 1912 to 1914 by Thomas Keenan. It was added to the Queensland Heritage Register on 21 October 1992.

== History ==
The original St Brigid's Red Hill church was blessed and opened on 30 December 1882. It replaced an earlier stone structure built in 1877.

As the parish grew to be one of the largest in Brisbane, a larger church was needed to accommodate 1000 people. The current Church's foundation stone was laid on 5 May 1912 and it was built from 1912 to 1914.

The parish was largely composed of poor Irish immigrants so that the church became a focal point of the Irish Catholic cause in Queensland.

=== Opening ceremony ===
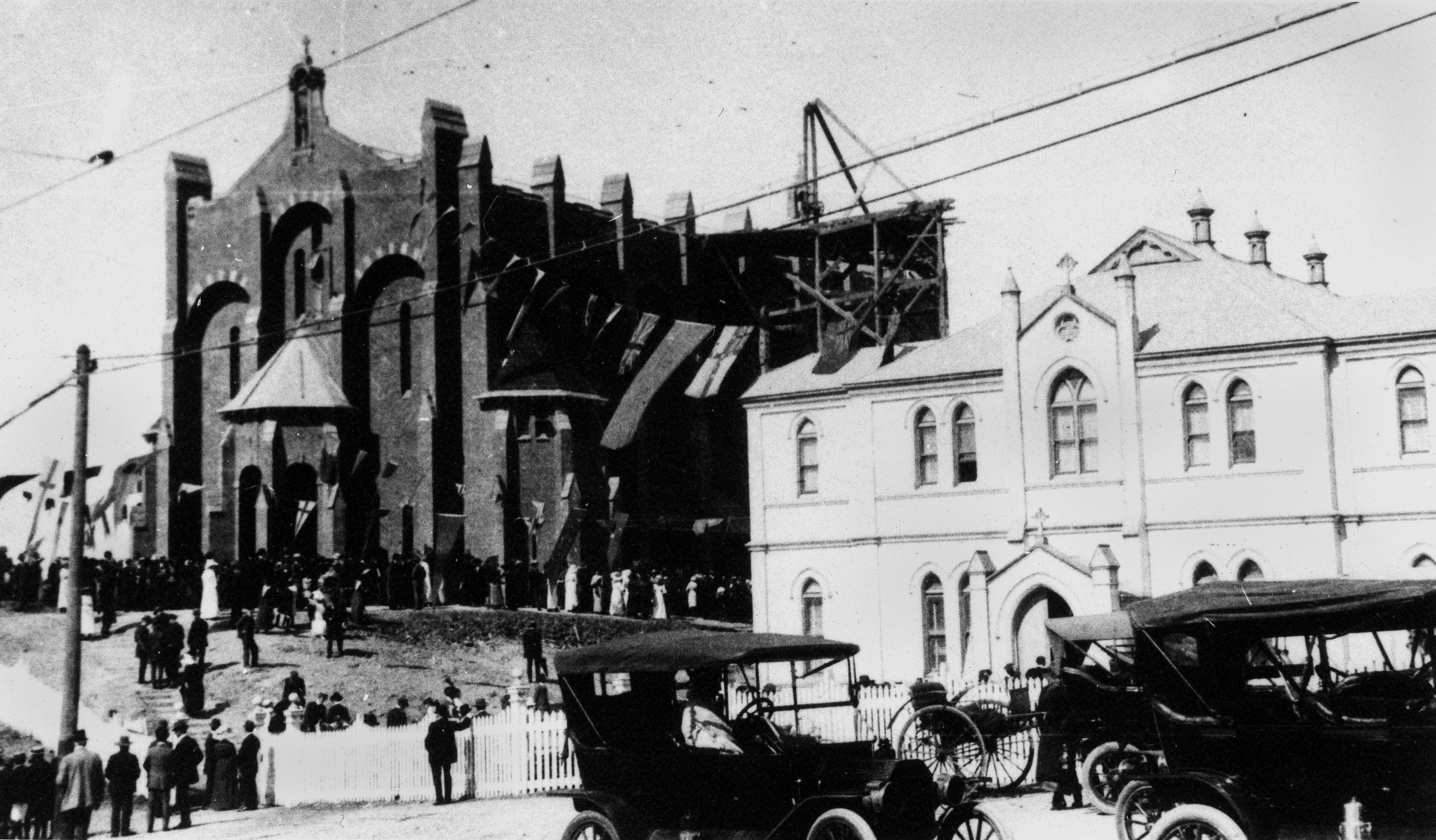
Dedication ceremony at St Brigids Catholic Church, 1914

The church was dedicated and opened on 9 August 1914. The opening ceremony was a significant occasion in the life of the Catholic community in Brisbane, attended by Archbishop of Melbourne Daniel Mannix and presided over by Archbishop of Brisbane James Duhig. The construction of St Brigid's was regarded as the coming of age of Catholicism in Brisbane. For Duhig, who was to become renowned as a prolific builder of churches and schools, St Brigid's was an auspicious beginning.

=== School ===
The St Brigid's School no longer operates. The nearest school is the Petrie Terrace State School down the hill to the south in Paddington.

== Current use ==
St Brigid's Church is part of the Jubilee Catholic Parish including seven churches and three schools in the inner western suburbs of Brisbane.

=== Parish newsletter ===
Newsletters for the Jubilee Parish provide contact details and further information on the Parish.

== Description ==
=== Position ===
St Brigid's Church is significant as it is an icon on the inner Brisbane skyline, visible from all directions. The church is prominently situated high on Red Hill, unconventionally oriented north-south, to terminate the vista along George Street (the view had been lost with the construction of the Brisbane Transit Centre but has been restored with the 2020 demolition of the Transit Centre). Its hilltop position, close to the city centre, makes it a Brisbane landmark.

St Brigid's Church is significant as an example of Archbishop Duhig's efforts to place churches in prominent positions throughout Brisbane, and as a symbol of the emerging confidence of Catholicism in Queensland which was dominated by Irish immigrants at the time.

=== Architecture ===
It is a brick fortress-like building, rectangular, with the chancel, entrance porch and its flanking buttresses semi-octagonal in shape. A single-storeyed vestry protrudes off the west side of the chancel. A single-storeyed vestry protrudes off the west side of the chancel.

Its design by Robert Smith Dods (commonly known as Robin S. Dods) was inspired by St Ceciles Cathedral at Albi, France, which the parish building committee had chosen as the model for St Brigid's. It is an outstanding example, both internally and externally, of the architecture of Robin Dods, It reflects the influence of some of the design theories current in Europe during Dods's early career in Edinburgh, in particular the Arts and Crafts use of materials and the picturesque approach to landscape and siting. Many features of the building, including the high proportions, opening windows with balconies, arches, French doors, and the open chancel area, contribute to a cool environment.

The original plan included a tower above the chancel but this was not built for lack of funds. LJ Harvey's life size statue of St Brigid above the entrance porch, holds a model of the completed church.

=== Interior ===
The interior of St Brigid's is austere and simple in decoration yet grand in dimensions. The detailing and workmanship in brick, stone, wood, glass and metal are austere but refined. Notable features include the timber ceiling, light fittings, gallery, organ, altars and stained glass. However, the original silky oak and leadlight doors running the length of the nave on the east and west walls, and some other fixed glazing, have been replaced with fully glazed areas which allow excessive light into the interior at floor level.

=== Pipe organ ===
St Brigid's contains a recently renovated pipe organ in the choir loft that fills the church.

== Heritage listing ==
St Brigid's Church was listed on the Queensland Heritage Register on 21 October 1992 having satisfied the following criteria.

The place is important in demonstrating the evolution or pattern of Queensland's history.

St Brigid's Church is significant as an example of Duhig's efforts to place churches in prominent positions throughout Brisbane and as a symbol of the emerging confidence of Catholicism in Queensland which was dominated by Irish immigrants at the time.

The place is important in demonstrating the principal characteristics of a particular class of cultural places.

St Brigid's Church is significant as a characteristic part of the inner Brisbane skyline, visible from all directions. It is an outstanding example, both internally and externally, of the architecture of Robin Dods, a recognised member of the contemporary Arts and Crafts movement in Europe and the United States of America.

The place is important because of its aesthetic significance.

St Brigid's Church is significant as a self-conscious townscape composition designed to place an acropolis-like skyline on the axis of George Street and for the impressive quality of the interior which is derived from the carefully considered combination of materials, light and scale.

== See also ==
- St Brigid's Convent, Red Hill
