= Jones Hill, Queensland =

Jones Hill Gympie, Queensland
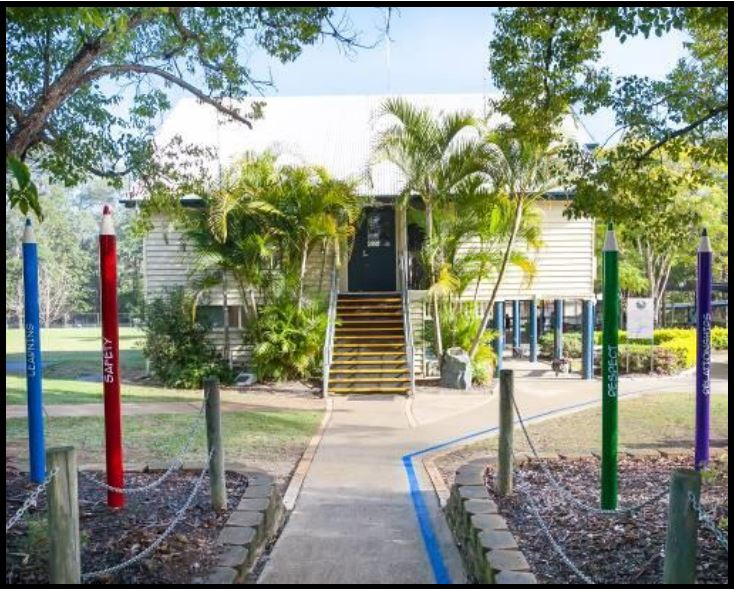
- Jones Hill State School, 2024

- Coordinates: 26.2305°S 152.6694°E
- Population: 1,135 (2021 census)
  - Density: 141.9/km^{2} (367.5/sq mi)
- Postcode(s): 4570
- Area: 8.0 km^{2} (3.1 sq mi)
- Time zone: AEST (UTC+10:00)
- Location: 5.6 km (3 mi) S of Gympie; 168 km (104 mi) N of Brisbane
- LGA(s): Gympie Region
- State electorate(s): Gympie
- Federal division(s): Wide Bay
Suburbs around Jones Hill:
Pie Creek	Southside	Monkland
Pie Creek	Jones Hill	The Dawn
McIntosh Creek	Long Flat	Long Flat

Jones Hill is a rural locality in the Gympie Region, Queensland, Australia. In the 2021 census, Jones Hill had a population of 1,135 people.

== Geography ==
Jones Hill is 5.6 kilometres (3.5 mi) south of Gympie's central business district on the south-western bank of the Mary River. Historically farm land, as at 2023, the land use is mostly residential with smaller suburban land parcels in the north-west of the locality and the rest of the locality being larger rural residential blocks. Some land is used for agriculture, a mix of grazing on native vegetation and irrigated horticulture.

== History ==
Jones Hill State School opened on 29 January 1902.

== Demographics ==
At the 2006 census, Jones Hill had a population of 550 people.

In the 2016 census, Jones Hill had a population of 898 people.

In the 2021 census, Jones Hill had a population of 1,135 people.

== Heritage listings ==
Jones Hill has the following heritage listings:

- Jones Hill Reservoir, Waterworks Road
- Waterworks Pump House, Waterworks Road
- Jones Hill School, 17 McIntosh Creek Road

== Education ==
Jones Hill State School is a government primary (Prep-6) school for boys and girls at 21 McIntosh Creek Road (26.2291°S 152.6676°E). In 2017, the school had an enrolment of 399 students with 28 teachers (25 full-time equivalent) and 19 non-teaching staff (12 full-time equivalent). It includes a special education program.

There are no secondary schools in Jones Hill. The nearest government secondary school is Gympie State High School in Gympie to the north.
