= Red Hill, Queensland =

Red Hill
- Suburb
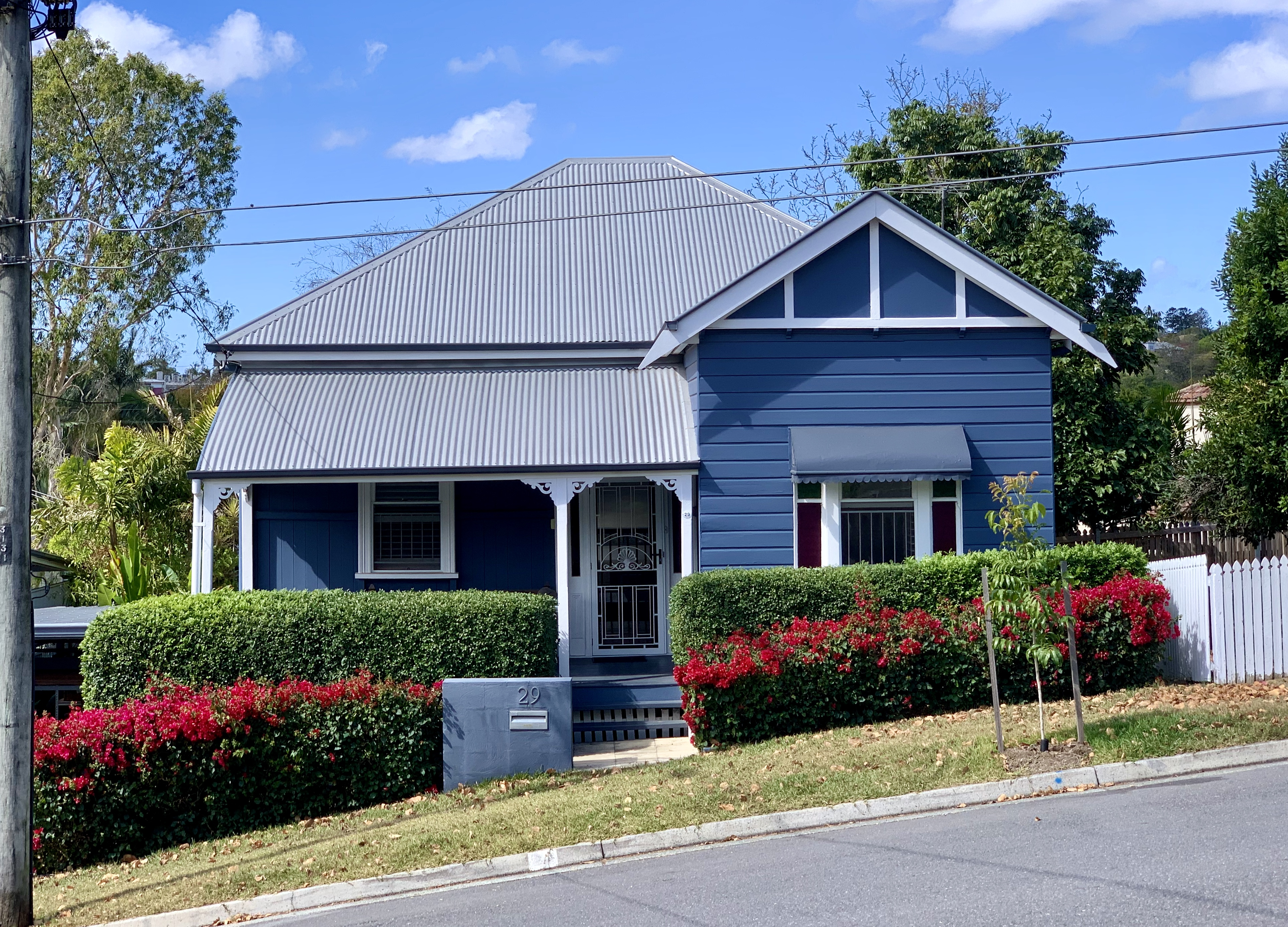
- Red Hill Queenslander

- Interactive map of Red Hill
- Coordinates: 27.4511°S 153.0038°E
- Country: Australia
- State: Queensland
- City: Brisbane
- LGA: City of Brisbane (Paddington Ward)
- Location: 3.2 km (2.0 mi) NW of Brisbane CBD
- Established: 1887

Government
  - State electorate: Cooper
  - Federal division: Brisbane

Area
  - Total: 1.6 km^{2} (0.62 sq mi)

Population
  - Total: 5,834 (2021 census)
  - Density: 3,650/km^{2} (9,440/sq mi)
- Time zone: UTC+10:00 (AEST)
- Postcode: 4059
Suburbs around Red Hill
Ashgrove	Newmarket	Kelvin Grove
Bardon	Red Hill	Kelvin Grove
Paddington	Paddington	Petrie Terrace

Red Hill is an inner northern suburb in the City of Brisbane, Queensland, Australia. In the 2021 census, Red Hill had a population of 5,834 people.

== Geography ==
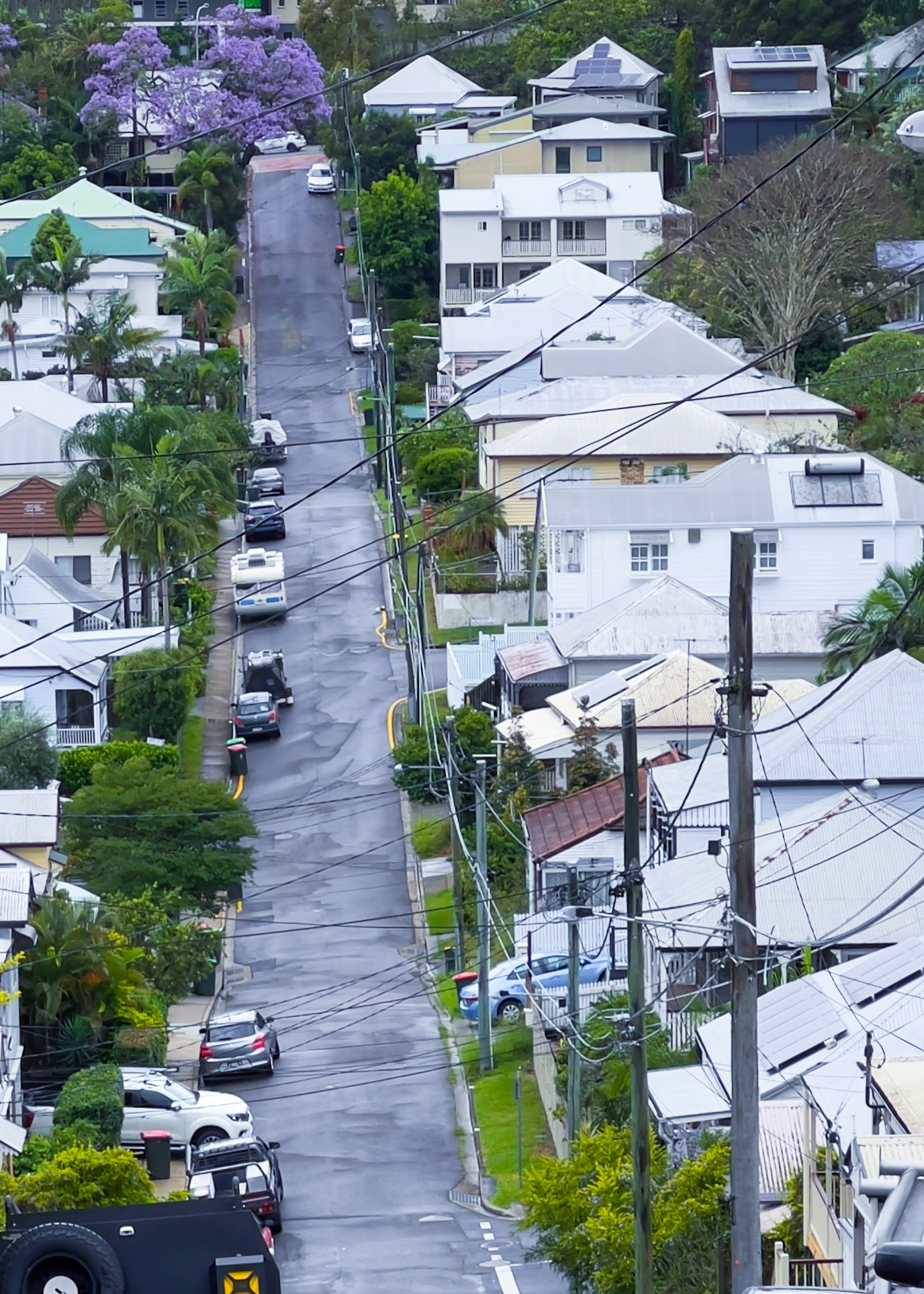
After the rain, Vale Street, Red Hill, 2022

Red Hill is 3.2 kilometres (2.0 mi) by road north-west of the Brisbane CBD. The suburb is very hilly and mainly residential, with shops and small businesses located on Musgrave and Waterworks Roads.

== History ==
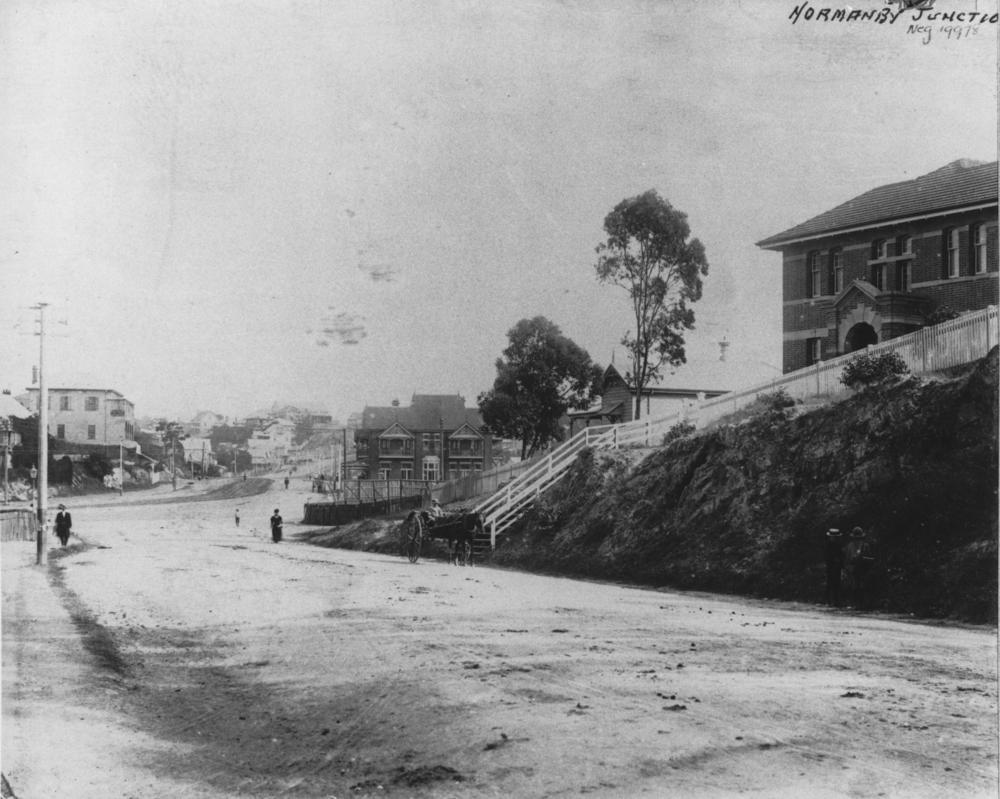
A view of Red Hill from College Road

The suburb is one of the oldest in Brisbane. Red Hill is named after its steep hills with red soil and rocks.

A Baptist chapel was built in 1874. In 1888, the chapel was replaced by the Windsor Road Baptist Church. As at 2021, the church is still operating and the building is listed on the Brisbane Heritage Register.

Circa 1880, 11 subdivided allotments of "Bristol Estate" were auctioned by J. Barger & Co. A map advertising the auction shows that the Estate is on Main Waterworks Road.

St Brigid's Catholic School opened on 15 January 1881 and closed on 31 October 1989.

In September 1883, 35 subdivided allotments were auctioned by E. Hooker & Son. A map advertising the auction shows that the allotments are in-between Oval Road and Waterworks Road.

In June 1884, 108 allotments were auctioned in the Ballantyne Estate by John W Todd.

In November 1888, 67 subdivided allotments of "Lilley's Hill" were auctioned by W. J. Hooker. A map advertising the auction shows that the site has frontages to: Main Waterworks Road, Clifton Street, Clifton Terrace, Windsor Road, Oval (Victoria Street) Road, Prospect Terrace and Charles Street.

From 1887, Red Hill was part of Shire of Ithaca, which subsequently became the Town of Ithaca in 1903. The Ithaca Town Council was absorbed into the Brisbane City Council in 1925. The council chambers of the former Town Council were located in Enoggera Terrace and after amalgamation were used by the Brisbane City Council as a public library. The library closed in 1998.

A landmark of the suburb is St Bridget's Church, Red Hill, a Roman Catholic church, which was built in 1914. Its hilltop position and grand structure ensures that it is visible from all directions.

Musgrave Road was the largest and main shopping strip before 1918, with a picture theatre, motor garage, grocers, fruiter, drapers and furniture shops.

Ithaca Bowling Club was founded in February 1930 to cater for the western suburbs. In May 1930 they leased space in Gilbert Park in Fulcher Street to create their bowling green. The clubhouse was officially opened on 9 May 1931 by Brisbane Lord Mayor Archibald Watson. Due to falling membership numbers, the club went into voluntary receivership in June 2011. The Red Hill Community Sports Club was then formed through merging Normanby Rugby League Club, Normanby Social Bowls Club and the Ashgrove RSL to take over the site and continue to run it for social bowls and other community purposes.

Red Hill Special School opened on 28 January 1986.

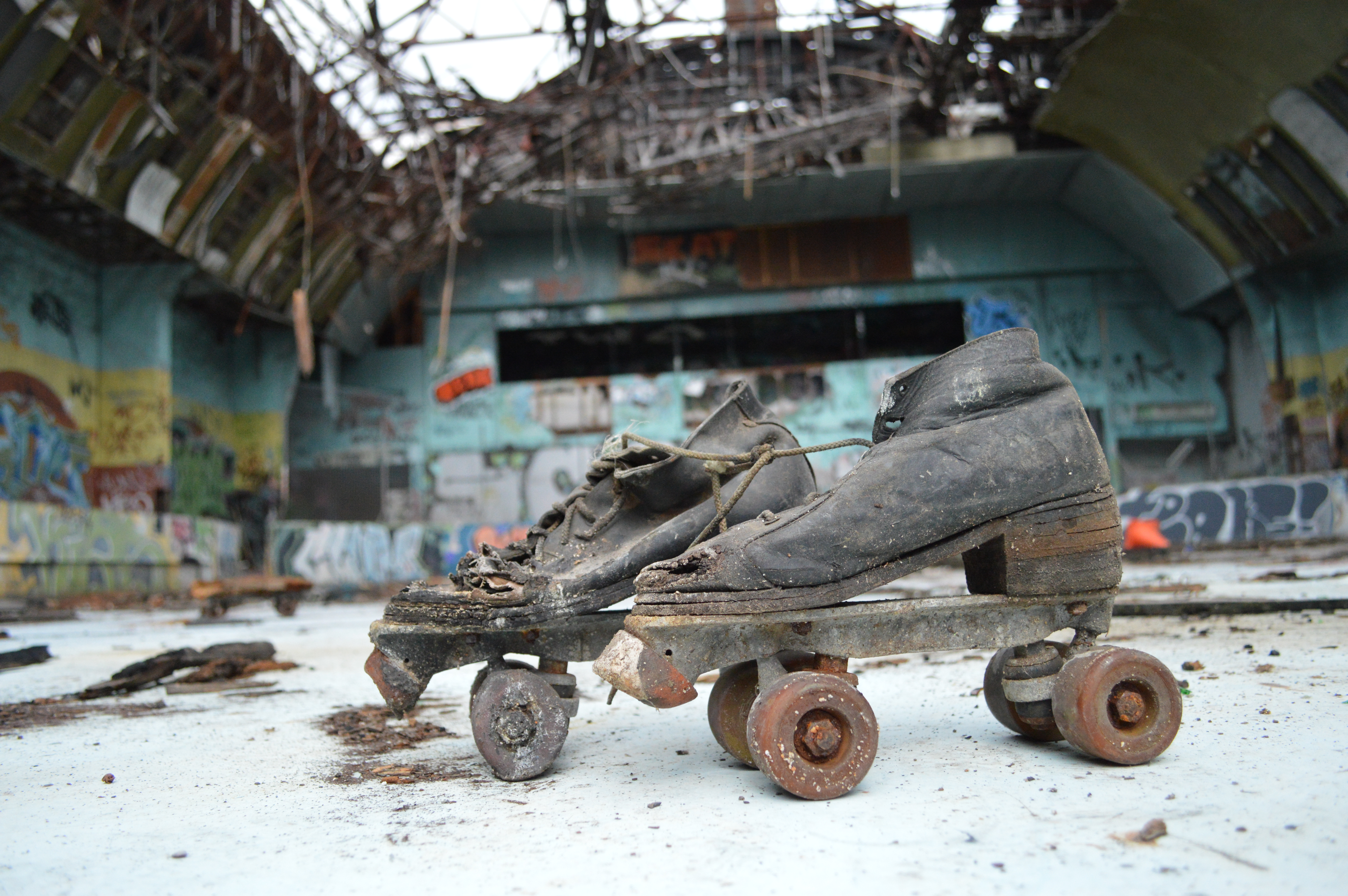
Abandoned roller skates and graffiti at the burned-out Skate Arena, 2014

Red Hill Picture Pops Theatre opened on Saturday 14 December 1912 on the northern corner of Enoggera Terrace and Musgrave Road (27.4526°S 153.0041°E). It was an open-air cinema. On 16 October 1920 the open-air cinema was replaced with a new brick enclosed cinema on the southern corner of Enoggera Terrace and Musgrave Road (27.4529°S 153.0043°E). It was 172 by 66 feet (52 by 20 m) and could seat 1,400 people. It cost £7,000. The opening night was dedicated to raise funds for the Ithaca War Memorial. In April 1934 it became the State Theatre. It functioned as a cinema until 1964, when it was converted into music venue called Teen City. In 1965 it was converted into a roller skating rink called Skate Arena. It was destroyed by arson on 26 December 2002. It was derelict for many years. Brothers Peter and Stephen Sourris spent 2 years redeveloping the building and re-opened it as a 5-screen complex, called the Red Hill Cinemas, on Saturday 30 November 2019. Their uncle and aunt, Christopher James and Effie Sourris had briefly owned the cinema in 1954.

== Demographics ==
In the 2011 census, Red Hill had a population of 5,016 people, 48.6% female and 51.4% male. The median age of the Red Hill population was 43 years, 6 years above the Australian median. 89.1% of people living in Red Hill were born in Australia, compared to the national average of 69.8%; the next most common countries of birth were England 1.2%, South Africa 1.2%, Zambia 1.2%, Czech Republic 1.2%. 93.7% of people spoke only English at home; the next most common languages were Italian 2.4%, Greek 2.0%, Mandarin 1.5%, French 1.2% and Cantonese 1.0%.

In the 2016 census, Red Hill had a population of 5,560 people.

In the 2021 census, Red Hill had a population of 5,834 people, with a median age of 33.

== Heritage listings ==
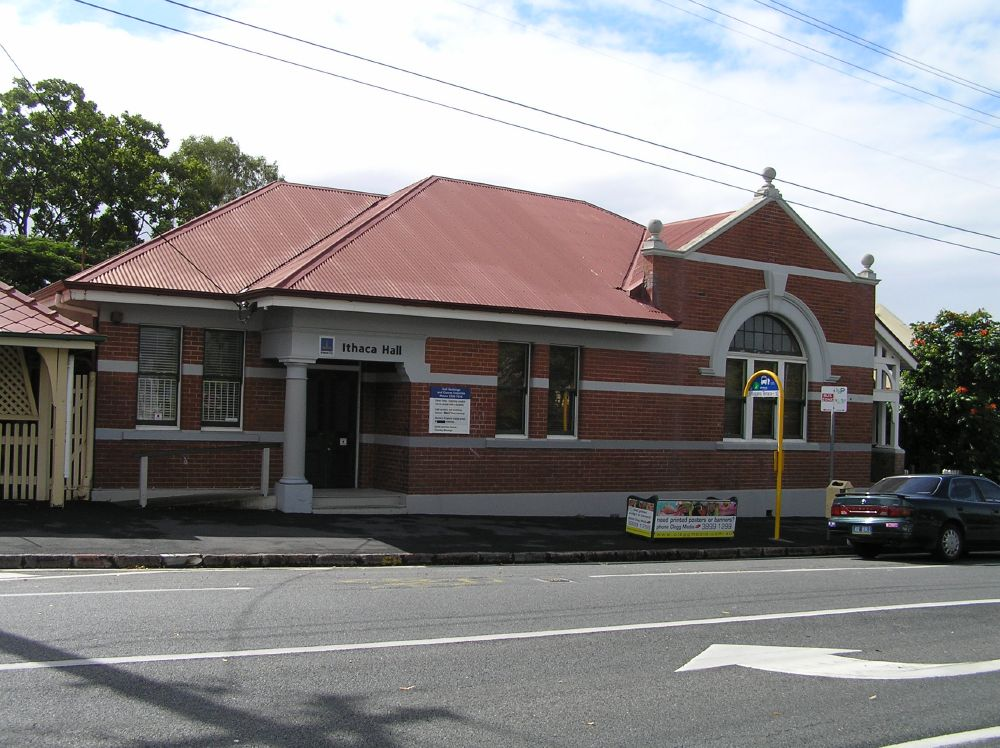
Former Ithaca Town Council Chambers, 2009

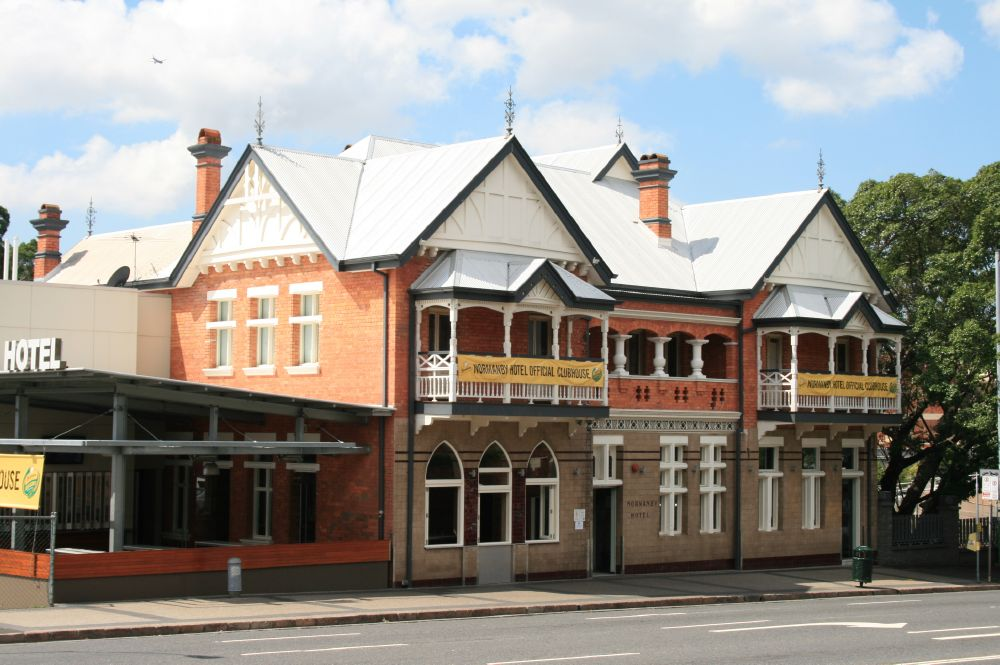
Normanby Hotel, 2008

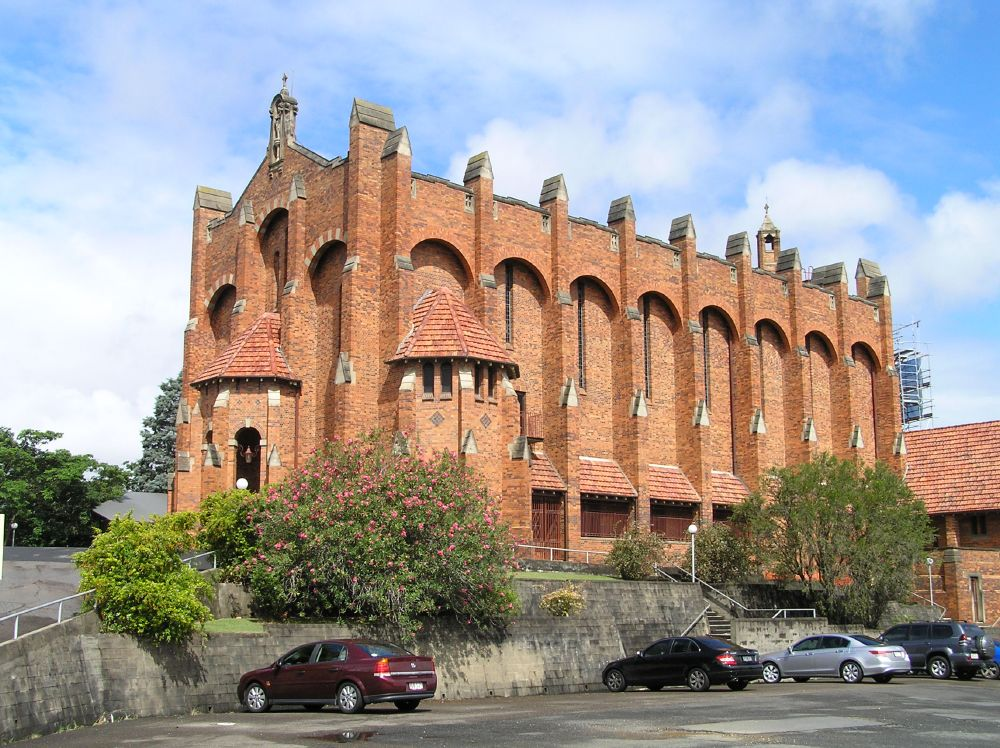
St Brigid's Catholic Church, 2009

Red Hill has a number of heritage-listed sites, including:

- 44–50 Cairns Terrace: Cross Terrace
- 2 Enoggera Terrace: Skate Arena
- 99 Enoggera Terrace: Ithaca Town Council Chambers
- 1 Musgrave Road: Normanby Hotel
- 6–8 Musgrave Road: Warriston
- 78 Musgrave Road: St Brigid's Church
- 9–17 Upper Clifton Terrace: St Brigid's Convent
- 101 Windsor Road: Craigerne

== Education ==
Red Hill Special School is a special education primary and secondary (Early Childhood to Year 12) school for boys and girls at 72 Waterworks Road (27.4507°S 153.0006°E). In 2017, the school had an enrolment of 64 students with 31 teachers (26 full-time equivalent) and 44 non-teaching staff (25 full-time equivalent). a secondary (7–12) campus at 5 Fulcher Rd (27.4490°S 152.9951°E).

There are no other schools in Red Hill. The nearest government mainstream primary schools are Kelvin Grove State College in Kelvin Grove to the east, Petrie Terrace State School in Paddington to the south, and Ithaca Creek State School in Bardon to the west. The nearest government mainstream secondary school is Kelvin Grove State College.

== Transport ==
Red Hill is serviced by multiple council buses.

Until August 1968, electric trams ran along Waterwords Road, Musgrave Road and Enoggera Terrace.

== Sport ==
The suburb is also the home of Brisbane's National Rugby League team, the Brisbane Broncos. Gilbert Park in Fulcher Road is the location of the Bronco's training ground, Leagues Club and general club management (27.4483°S 152.9962°E).

Red Hill Community Sports Club in Gilbert Park (27.4472°S 152.9967°E) is located adjacent to the Bronco's training ground.

== In popular culture ==
Nick Earls' novel Zigzag Street is set in the Red Hill street of the same name (27.4545°S 153.0062°E).
