= Dagun, Queensland =

Dagun
- Town
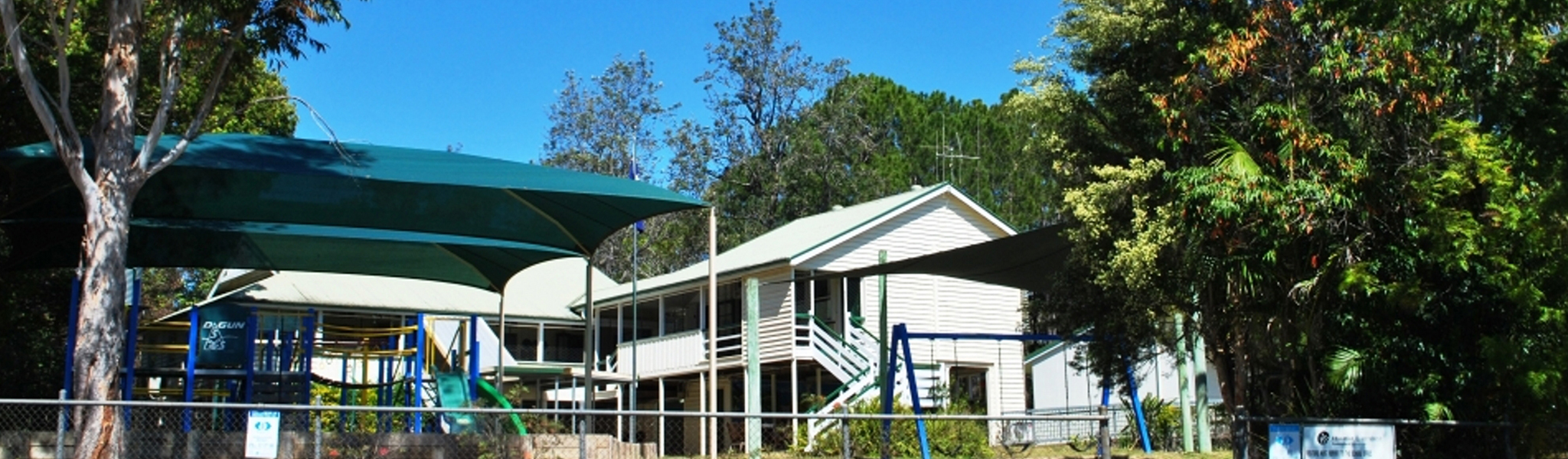
- Dagun State School, 2022

- Interactive map of Dagun
- Coordinates: 26.3220°S 152.6746°E
- Country: Australia
- State: Queensland
- LGA: Gympie Region
- Location: 17.1 km (10.6 mi) from Gympie; 18.9 km (11.7 mi) N of Imbil; 154 km (96 mi) NNW of Brisbane
- Established: 1890

Government
  - State electorate: Gympie
  - Federal division: Wide Bay

Area
  - Total: 7.1 km^{2} (2.7 sq mi)

Population
  - Total: 137 (2021 census)
  - Density: 19.30/km^{2} (50.0/sq mi)
- Time zone: UTC+10:00 (AEST)
- Postcode: 4570
Localities around Dagun
Calico Creek	Gilldora	Gilldora
Calico Creek	Dagun	Kybong
Amamoor	Amamoor	Amamoor

Dagun is a rural town and locality in the Gympie Region, Queensland, Australia. In the 2021 census, the locality of Dagun had a population of 137 people.

It is one of a chain of towns in the Mary Valley also including Amamoor, Imbil, and Kandanga.

== Geography ==
Amamoor Creek, a tributary of the Mary River, forms most of the eastern boundary. Mary Valley Road (State Route 51) passes through the eastern part of the locality from north to south. The Mary Valley Branch Railway passes through from north-east to south-east. Dagun railway station serves the town (26.3213°S 152.6763°E).

== History ==
The town takes its name from the railway station, which was named on 22 January 1914, using an Aboriginal word meaning home camp.

The Dagun State School opened on 18 June 1924.

Dagun Post Office opened on 1 June 1925 (a receiving office had been open from 1920) and closed in 1975.

== Demographics ==
In the 2016 census, the locality of Dagun had a population of 150 people.

In the 2021 census, the locality of Dagun had a population of 137 people.

== Heritage listings ==
Dagun has the following heritage listings:

- 39 Dagun Road: Dagun State School
- Kimlin Lane: Dagun Railway Station

== Education ==
Dagun State School is a government primary (Prep-6) school for boys and girls at 39 Dagun Road (26.3220°S 152.6769°E). In 2017, the school had an enrolment of 35 students with 5 teachers (3 full-time equivalent) and 6 non-teaching staff (3 full-time equivalent).

There is no secondary school in Dagun. The nearest government secondary schools are Mary Valley State College (to Year 10) in Imbil and Gympie State High School (to Year 12) in Gympie.
