= Gympie State High School =

Location
- 1 Everson Road; Gympie, Queensland; Australia
- Coordinates: 26.189°S 152.679°E

Information
- Type: Public, secondary
- Motto: Ecollegio Metallisque Aurum (Gold from the school as well as the mines)
- Established: 1912
- Principal: Anthony Lanskey
- Grades: 7–12
- Enrolment: 922 (2020)
- Colours: Maroon and gold

Gympie State High School is a coeducational public secondary school located in Gympie in the Wide Bay–Burnett region in Queensland, Australia. The school has a total enrolment of more than 900 students per year, with an official count of 922 students in August 2020.

Gympie State High School retains its original motto, Ecollegio Metallisque Aurum, meaning "Gold from the school as well as the mines", and its official colours of maroon and gold.

== History ==
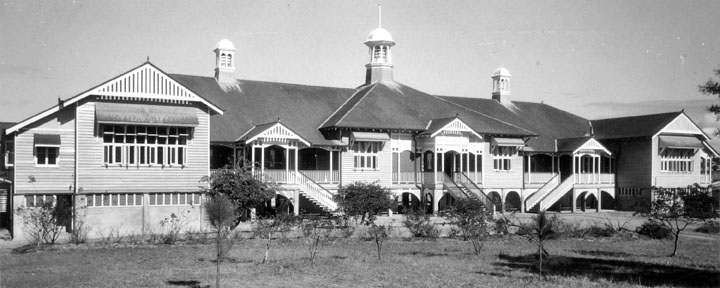
Gympie State High School original building, June 1940

Gympie State High School opened in 1912 as one of the first secondary schools in Queensland. An early staff member was the educationalist Jeanette Anne Gilbert. The school was originally located on Lawrence Street, where Gympie Central State School is now located. The first building on Cootharaba Road was constructed in 1917 and became one of Gympie's most iconic buildings. On 18 May 1955, the original building was destroyed by fire as a result of a science experiment. Later that year, Blocks B, C and D were built on the same site. Blocks E, J and M were later built in the 1960s, whereas Blocks A, H and Hamilton Hall were constructed during the 1970s, followed by the construction of Blocks N, O and the school pool during the 1980s. In the 1990s, K Block was reconstructed from a 1930s building and the present administration building was constructed. The last major development at Gympie State High School occurred in 2014 in preparation for the introduction of Year 7 to the school.

On 21 September 2018, some of the buildings at Gympie State High School were entered into the Queensland Heritage Register.

== Excellence programs ==
Excellence programs available to students include:

- Gympie Music School of Excellence
- On-line College of Coding
- Rural Industries School of Excellence (RISE) program
- Scholarship Program
- Specialised School of Excellence – Mathematics & Science
- Sport Academy (Rugby League, Futsal and Volleyball)

== Notable alumni ==
- Mostyn Hanger, Chief Justice of Queensland
- Charles Wanstall, politician and Chief Justice of Queensland
