= James Stodart =

Australian politician

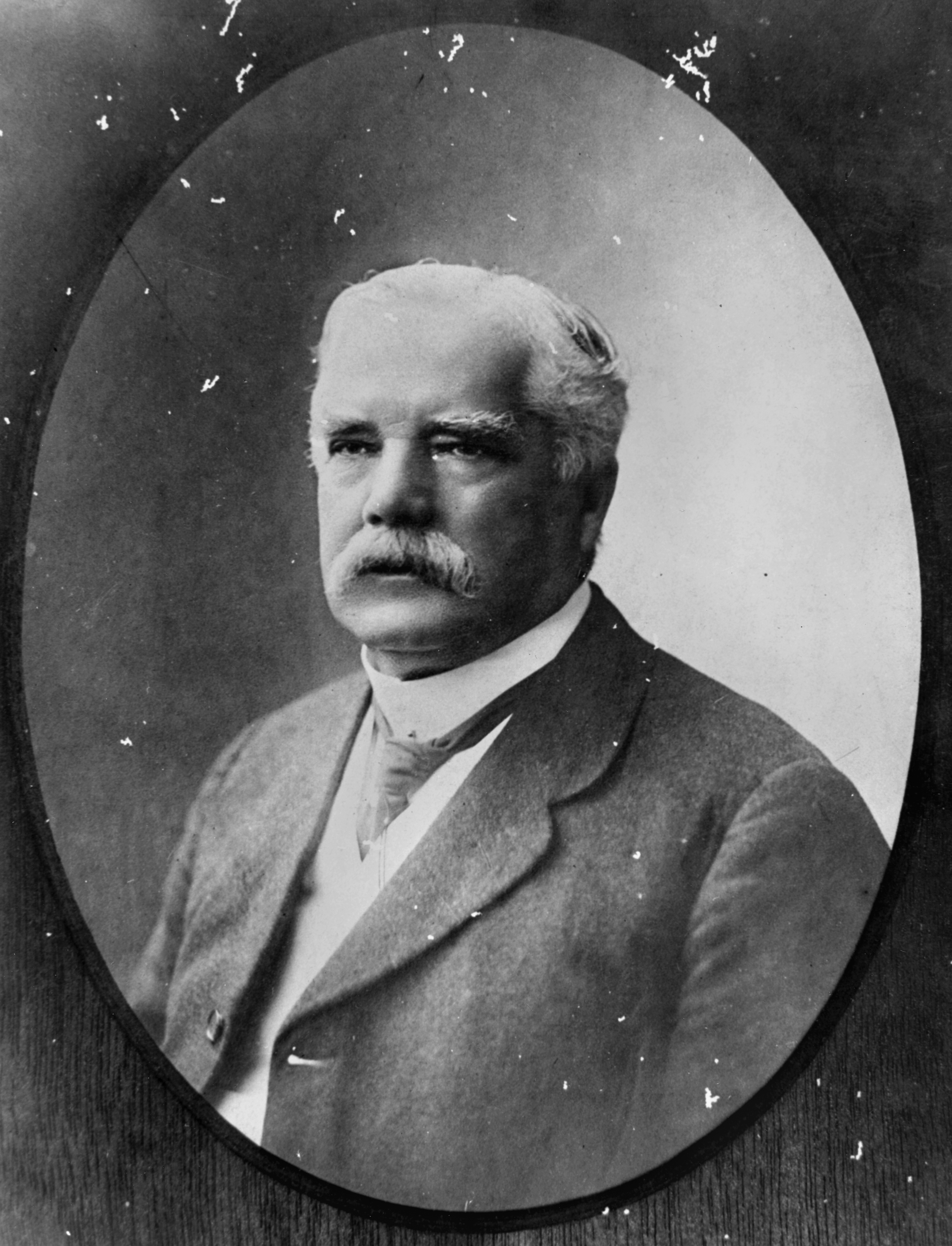

Member of the Queensland Legislative Assembly for Logan
- In office 15 August 1896 – 16 March 1918
- Preceded by: John Donaldson
- Succeeded by: Alfred James

Personal details
- Born: James Stodart; 15 September 1849 Edinburgh, Scotland
- Died: 20 June 1922 (aged 72) Ascot, Queensland, Australia
- Resting place: South Brisbane Cemetery
- Party: Ministerial
- Spouse: Elizabeth Henrietta Noble Gair (m.1878 d.1934)
- Relations: Colonel Robert Stodart (son), Robin Dods (nephew), Espie Dods (nephew), Charles Marks (brother-in-law)
- Occupation: Businessman, Consul for Sweden

James Stodart (1849–1922) was a politician in Queensland, Australia. He was a Member of the Queensland Legislative Assembly.

== Politics ==
James Stodart was elected to the Queensland Legislative Assembly in Logan in a by-election on 15 August 1896. He was Chairman of Committees from 13 July 1911 to 15 April 1915. He held Logan until 16 March 1918.

== Personal life ==
James Stodart married Elizabeth Henrietta Noble Gair in Melbourne in 1878. They had three children, Robert (1879–1956), twins Georgina "Nina" (1886–1972) and Charles (1886–1961). James Stodart was the brother of Elizabeth Gray (née Stodart). He was uncle to her sons architect Robin Dods and government medical officer Espie Dods from her first marriage to Robert Smith Dods and brother-in-law to her second husband Charles Ferdinand Marks, a Member of the Queensland Legislative Council and uncle to her sons Alexander Marks and Edward Marks from her second marriage.

Stodart's son, Lieutenant Colonel Robert Mackay Stodart led the 2nd Light Horse Regiment during the First World War. Stodart's daughter, Nina pursued art and taught at Brisbane Girls Grammar School and Somerville House. Some of her works are held in the Queensland Art Gallery.

Stodart served as honorary vice consul for Sweden from 19 June 1906 until 12 December 1913 when he was promoted to honorary consul.

Stodart died in 1922 and was buried in South Brisbane Cemetery.

Photo albums from the Stodart family are held in the University of Queensland Library, including images from Robert Stodart's World War 1 service.

Parliament of Queensland
Preceded by John Donaldson	Member for Logan; 1896–1918	Succeeded by Alfred James
