= Espie Dods House =

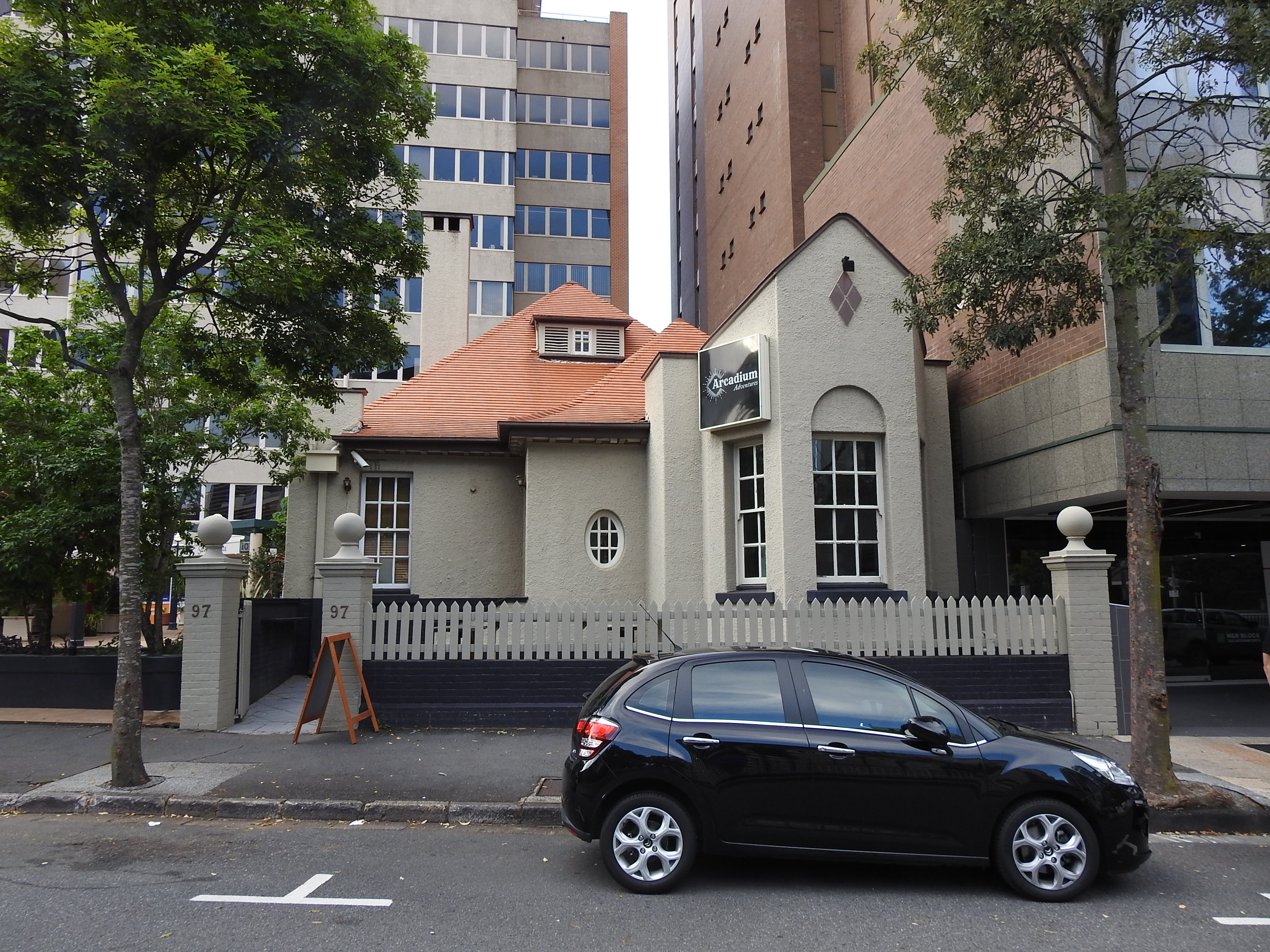
- Espie Dods House, front view, 2021

- Location within Queensland Location within Australia
- 27.4645°S 153.0265°E
- Location: 97 Wickham Terrace, Spring Hill, City of Brisbane, Queensland, Australia

History
- Design period: 1900–1914 (early 20th century)
- Built: c. 1906
- Built for: Espie Dods

Site notes
- Architect: Robin Dods

Queensland Heritage Register
- Official name: Ritas at Dods House Restaurant, Dods House
- Type: state heritage (built)
- Designated: 21 October 1992
- Reference no.: 600172
- Significant components: residential accommodation – main house, basement / sub-floor, fence/wall – perimeter

Espie Dods House is a heritage-listed detached house at 97 Wickham Terrace, Spring Hill, City of Brisbane, Queensland, Australia. It was designed by architect Robin Dods for his brother Espie Dods and was built c. 1906. It was added to the Queensland Heritage Register on 21 October 1992.

== History ==
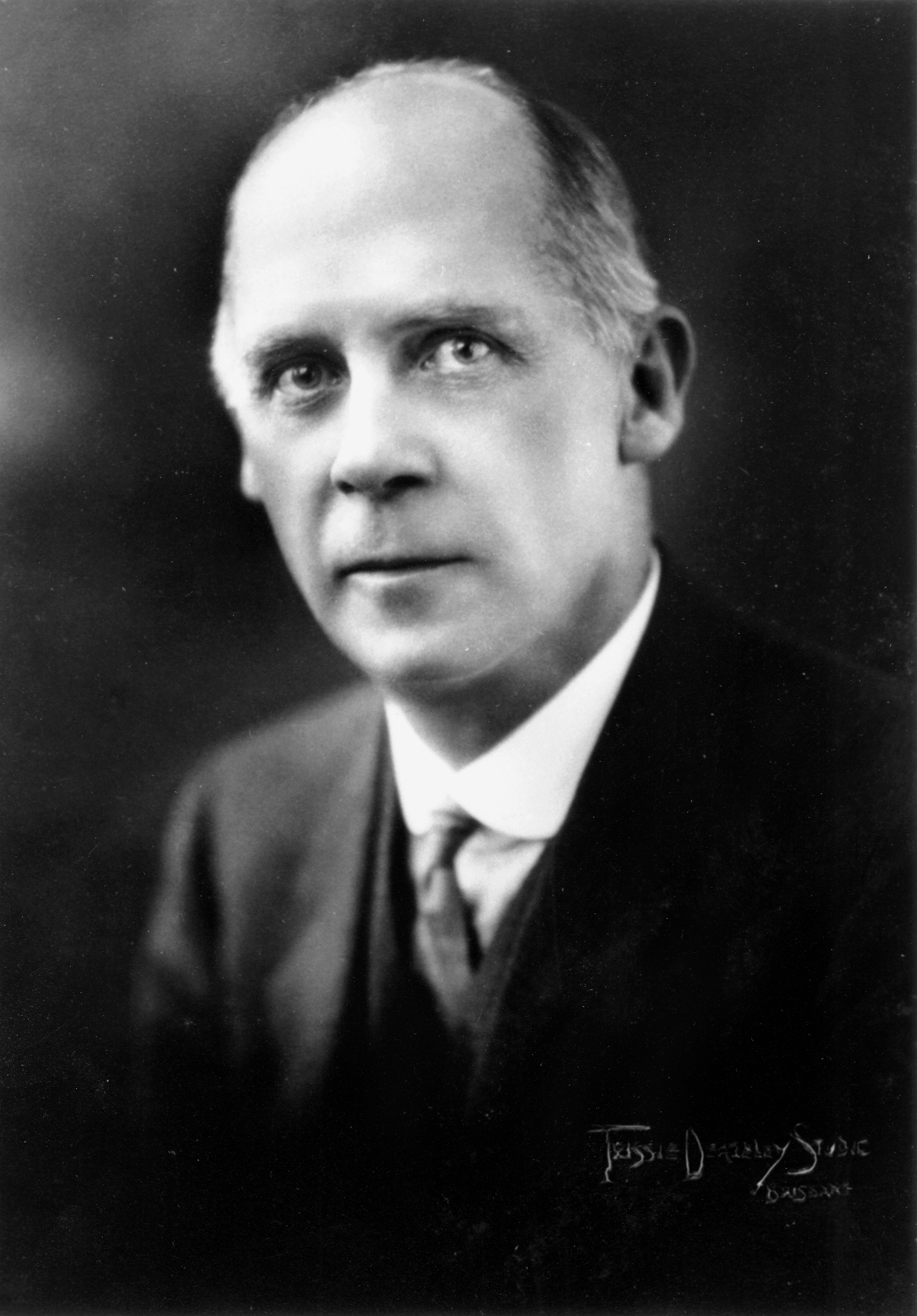
Dr J Espie Dods

The house was commissioned for Dr Espie Dods by his mother and built next to the family home owned by his stepfather, Dr Charles Ferdinand Marks. It was designed by Dods's brother Robin Dods, the well known architect, as a townhouse and surgery. Although Dods lived in the house for only a few years before moving up the hill to Callender House, the property remained in the Marks family's possession and was let as a residence and surgery to a series of doctors until it was sold as part of the Marks' property for redevelopment. The Marks' home and huge weeping fig tree were demolished in 1982 and replaced with the Silverton office tower, and Dods House was converted into a restaurant as part of the forecourt development.

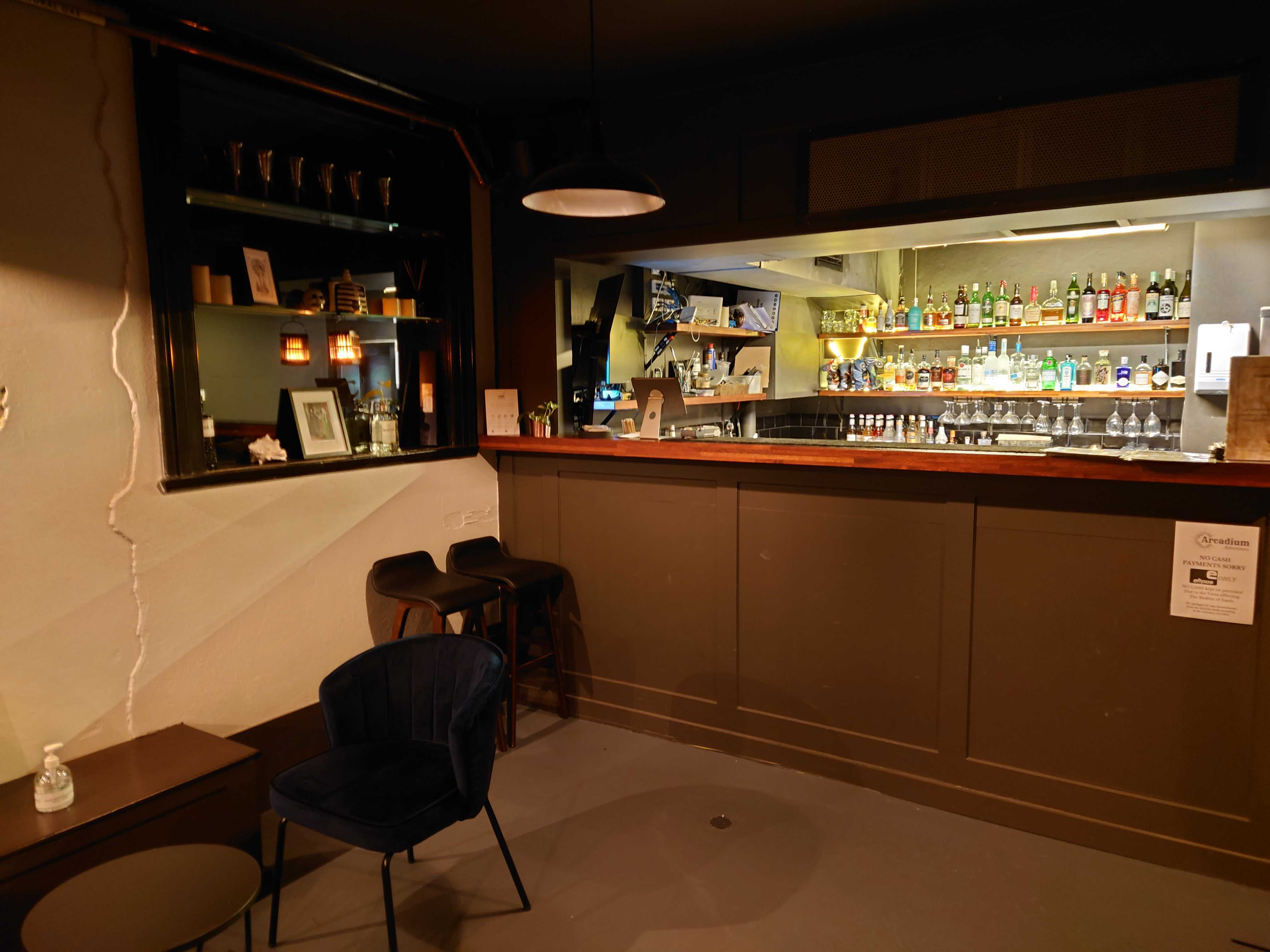
Arcadium Adventures - cocktail bar and escape rooms operated in the basement of Espie Dods House

Tenancy of the property changed significantly over the following century, with the ground floor and basement areas operating variously as tea rooms, a restaurant, a strip club, and a piano bar.

From the early 2000s until 2023, the ground level rooms housed an office of the National Trust of Queensland.

The basement level currently operates as an escape room venue and cocktail bar themed with a mysterious semi-fantasy setting.

== Description ==
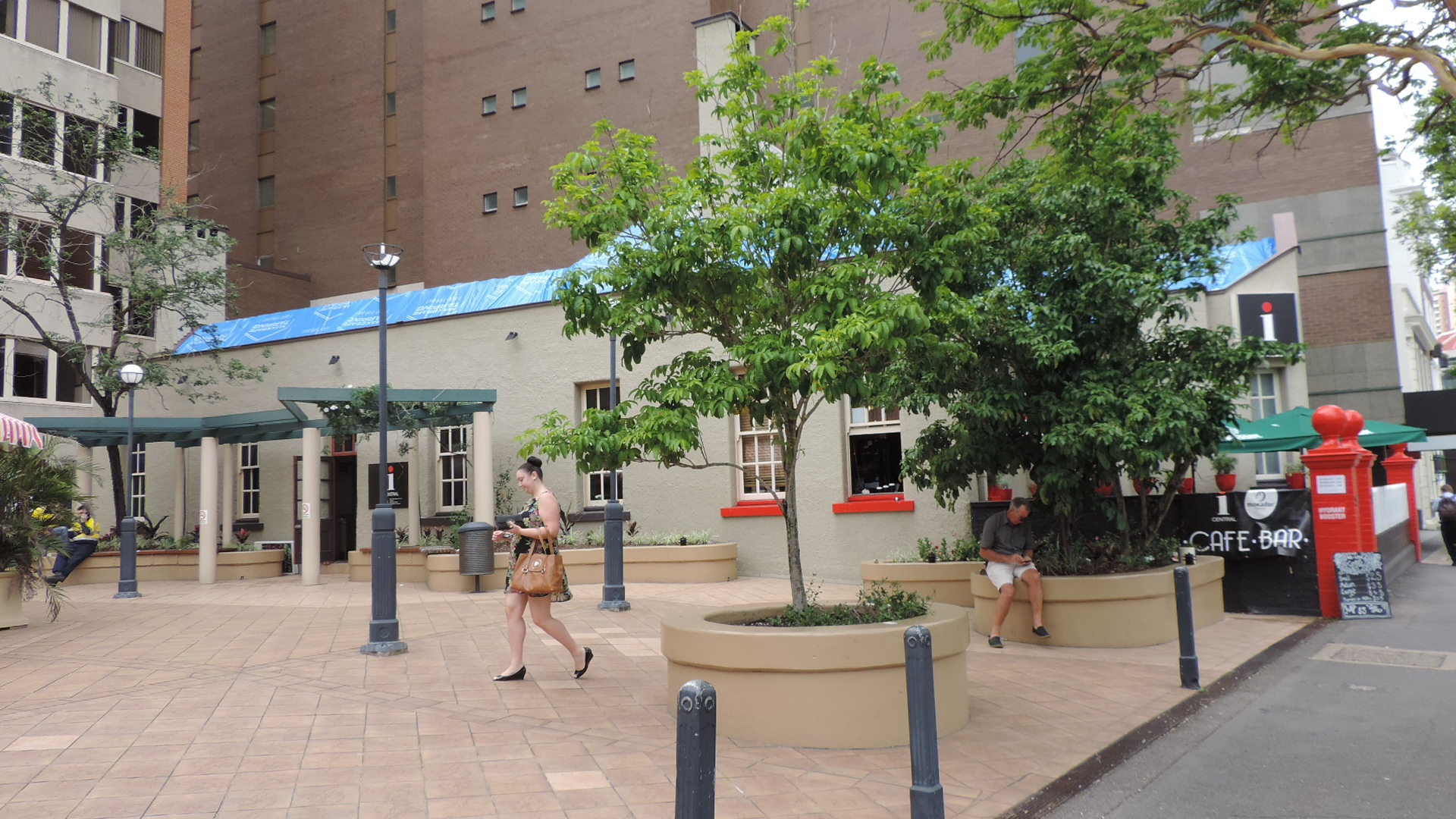
Espie Dods House, side view, following storm damage to roof, 2015

The house is solid brick with roughcast render, the Federation era design influenced by the Arts and Crafts movement. It is built on two levels, the ground floor facing Wickham Terrace, and a full subfloor which was formerly exposed as the land fell away toward the rear of the house. The front elevation is dominated by a gabled projection with a window bay. A small porch with an oval window nestles in the angle. The masonry fence with turned timber balusters complements the house. The roof is tiled in terracotta shingle tiles and features a blind dormer which is louvered and glazed.

The house had a long wing extending back from the square core. A verandah, and a double width verandah room or a piazza, extended into the yard between the wing and the core on both levels. Internally, the entry features a black and white marble floor and timber wall panelling. Elsewhere, the walls are lined in plaster with substantial joinery in silky oak. Some ceilings are lath and plaster while others, in particular the dining room are timber.

Four fireplaces are located at the front and rear of the building. Originally, the ground floor housed a doctor's consulting room, drawing room and bedrooms, while the dining room, kitchen and servants' rooms were located on the subfloor.

== Heritage listing ==
Espie Dods House was listed on the Queensland Heritage Register on 21 October 1992 having satisfied the following criteria.

The place is important in demonstrating the evolution or pattern of Queensland's history.

The significance of the house resides in its utilization, architectural style, and familial connections. It stands as a rare and enduring illustration of a combined doctor's residence and surgery, a practice that was once prevalent on Wickham Terrace. The only other extant examples are Bryntirion, which is still a residence, and Callender House which was also occupied by Dr Espie Dods and renovated by his architect brother Robin Dods.

The house reflects Robin Dods' Scottish training and contemporary "Arts and Crafts" design trends which he fused with vernacular elements to create an unusual and innovative design. This was unlike any of his other domestic work and used materials and features uncommon in Queensland houses of the Federation period.

That the place is still known as Dods House testifies to the strong public association which exists between the building and its designer and first owner. Robin Dods was a prolific and respected architect in Brisbane and then Sydney.

The place demonstrates rare, uncommon or endangered aspects of Queensland's cultural heritage.

The significance of the house lies in its use, building style and family associations.

It is a rare surviving example of a combined doctor's residence and surgery which was once commonplace on Wickham Terrace. The only other extant examples are Bryntirion, which is still a residence, and Callender House which was also occupied by Dr Espie Dods and renovated by his architect brother Robin Dods.

The place is important in demonstrating a high degree of creative or technical achievement at a particular period.

The significance of the house lies in its use, building style and family associations.

The house reflects Robin Dods' Scottish training and contemporary "Arts and Crafts" design trends which he fused with vernacular elements to create an unusual and innovative design. This was unlike any of his other domestic work and used materials and features uncommon in Queensland houses of the Federation period.

The place has a special association with the life or work of a particular person, group or organisation of importance in Queensland's history.

The significance of the house lies in its use, building style and family associations.

That the place is still known as Dods House testifies to the strong public association which exists between the building and its designer and first owner. Robin Dods was a prolific and respected architect in Brisbane and then Sydney.

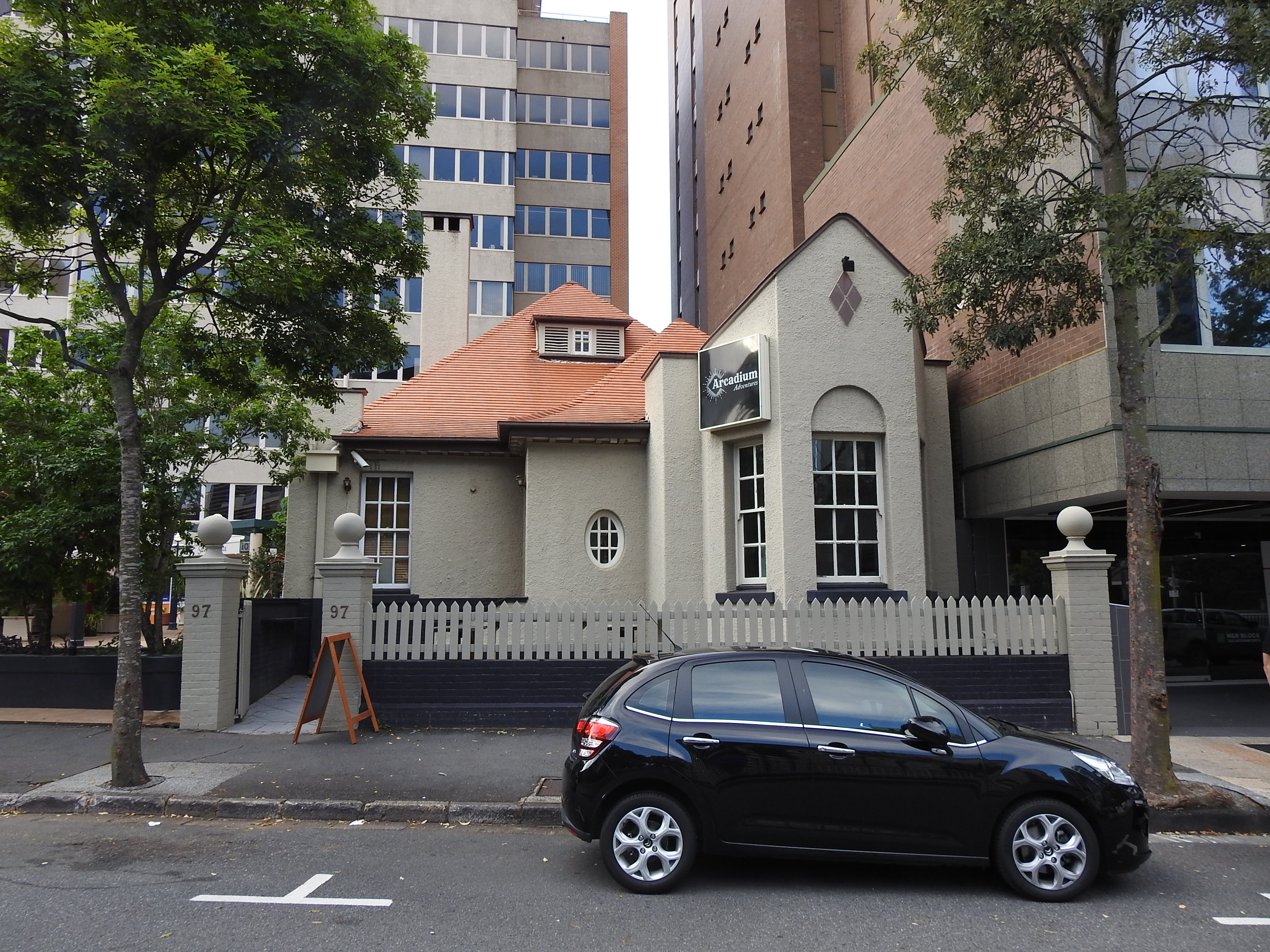
Front face (2021).

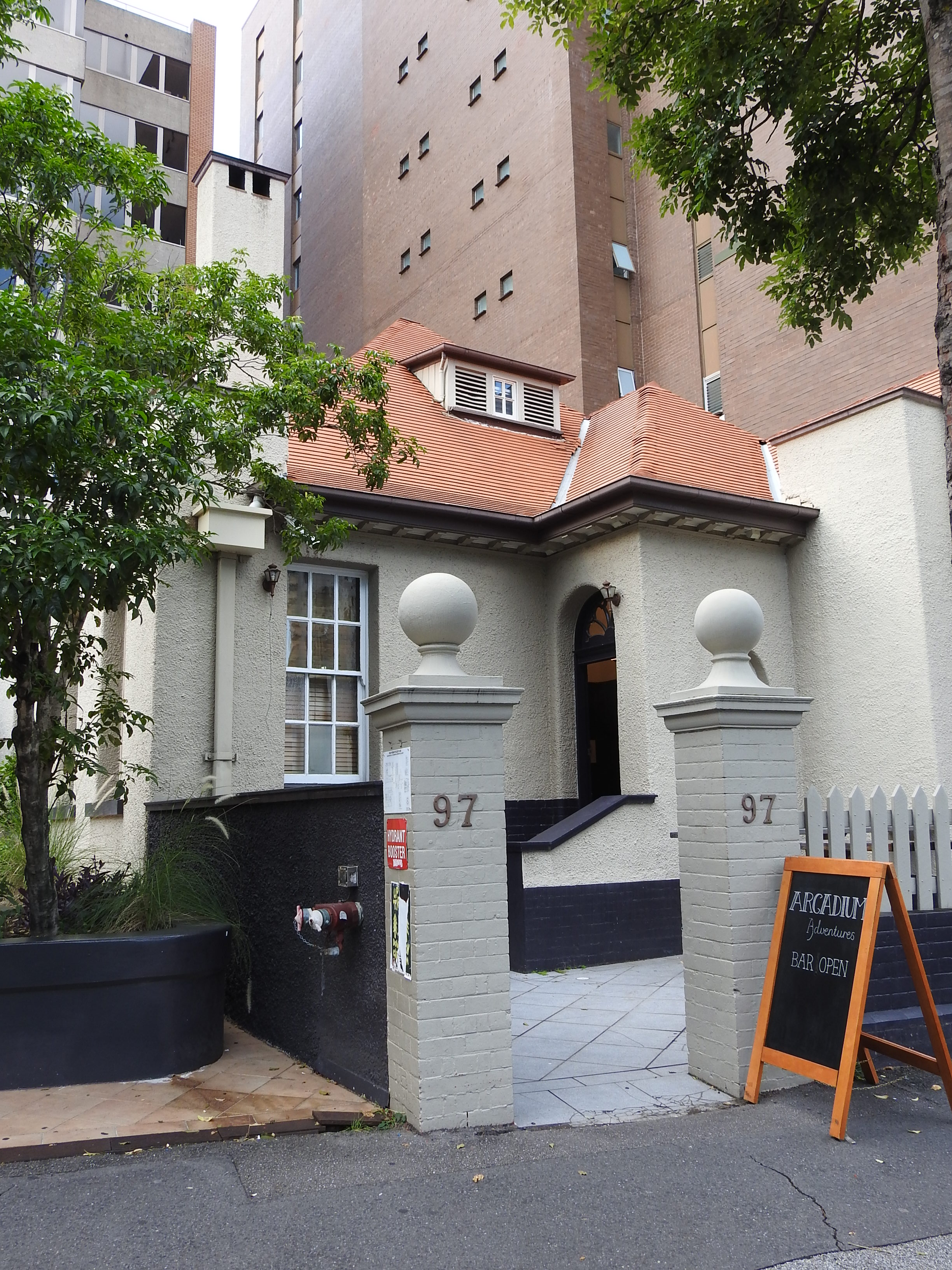
Front entrance (2021).

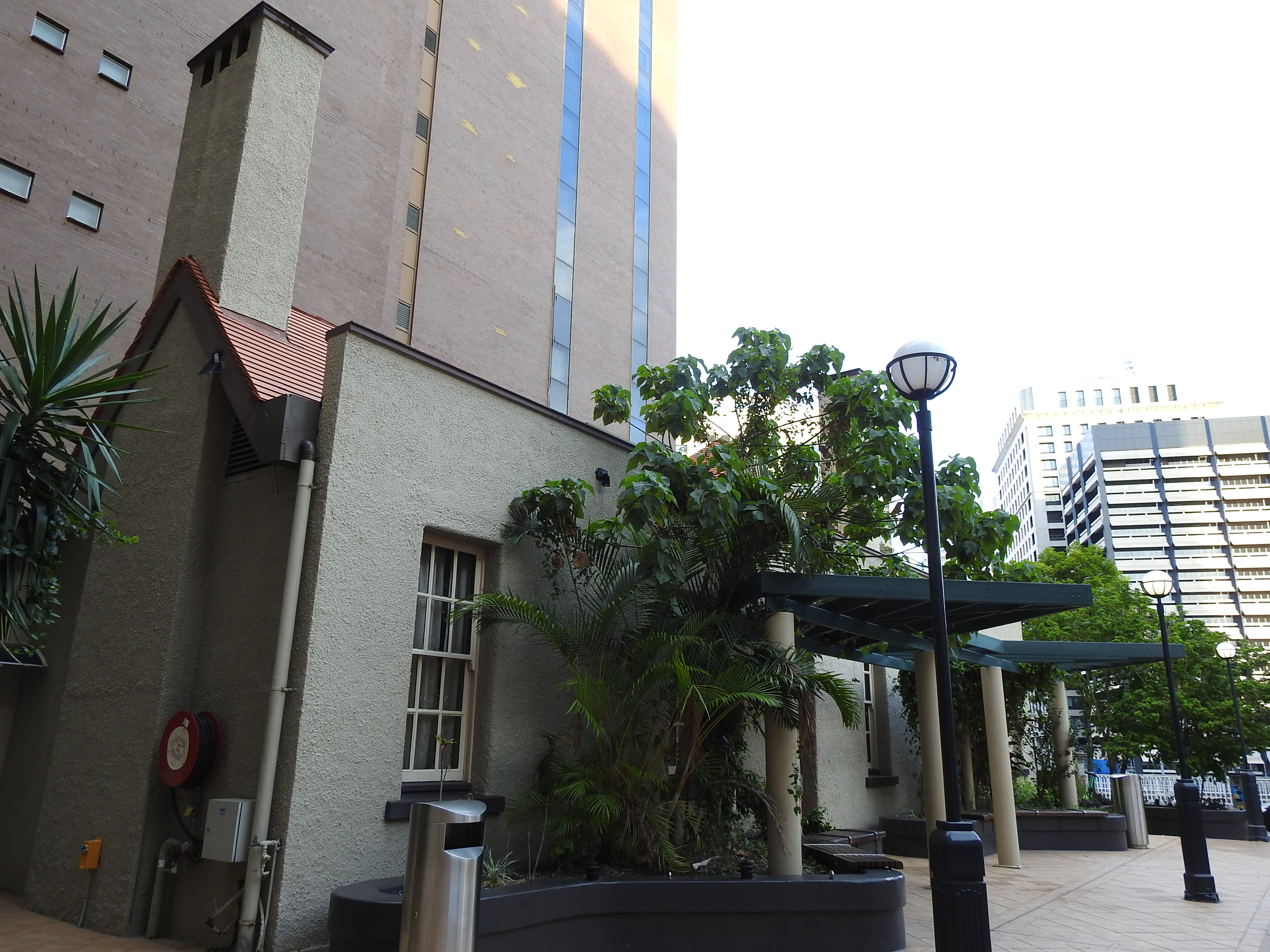
Rear (2021).

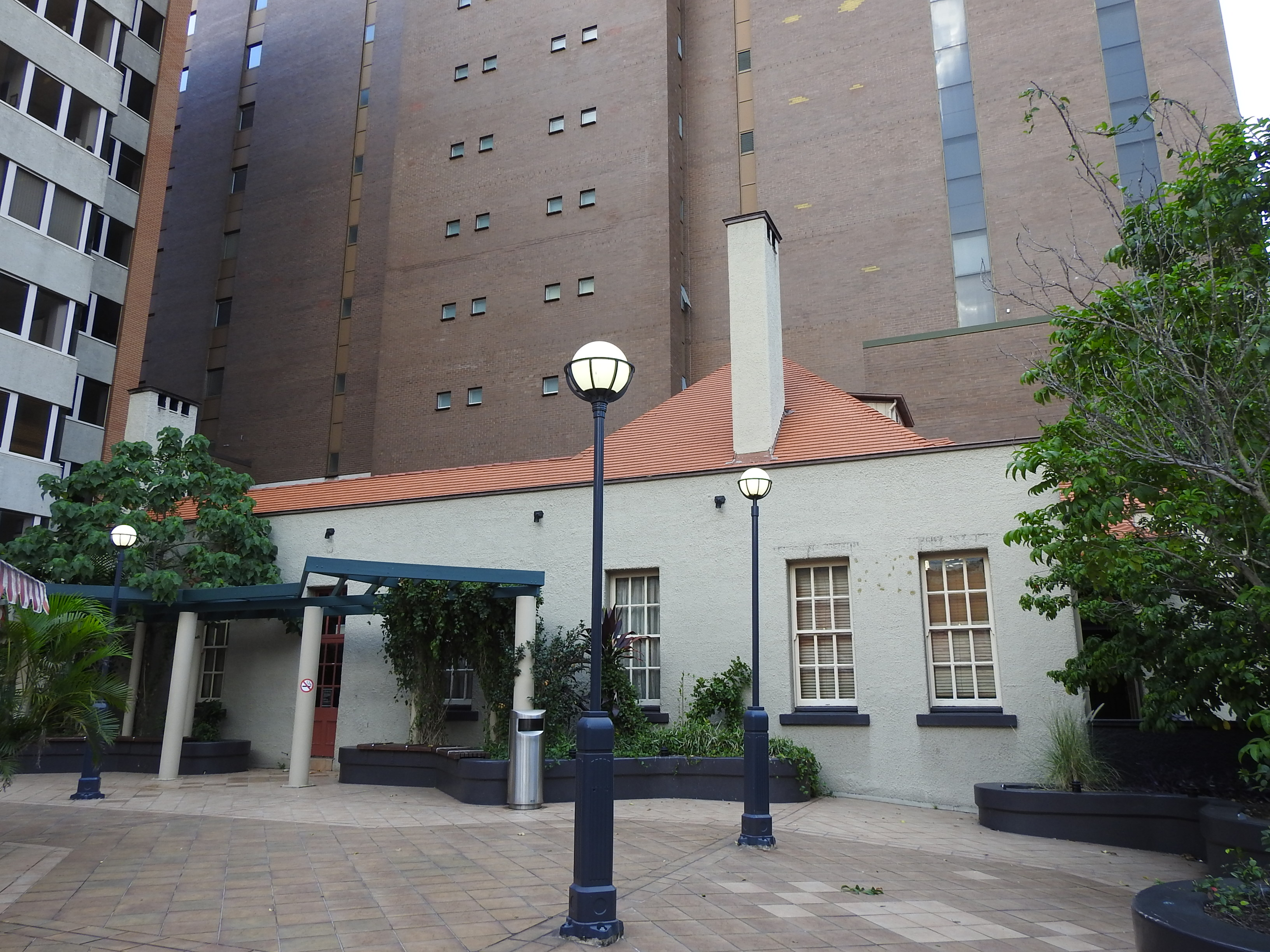
Side face (2021).
