= Myendetta Homestead =

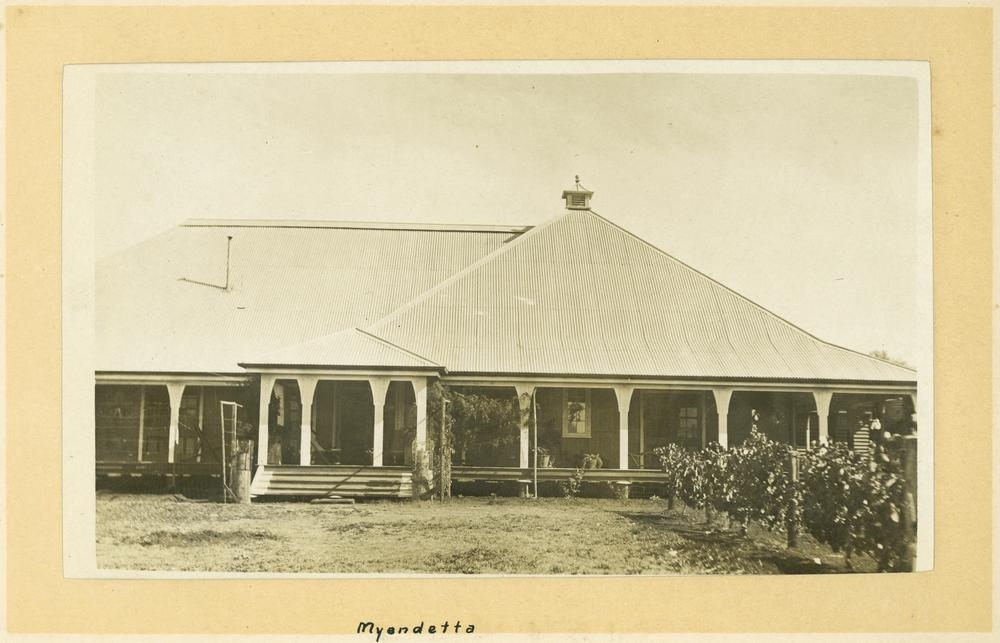
- Myendetta Homestead, circa 1915

- Location within Queensland
- 26.5662°S 146.0228°E
- Location: Myendetta Station, Bakers Bend, Shire of Murweh, Queensland, Australia

History
- Design period: 1900–1914 (early 20th century)
- Built for: Charles Decimus Edmund Francis

Site notes
- Architect: Robin Dods
- Architectural style: Arts & Crafts

Queensland Heritage Register
- Official name: Myendetta
- Type: state heritage
- Designated: 2 December 2013
- Reference no.: 602822
- Builders: Gibbs Brothers (Charleville)

Myendetta Homestead is a heritage-listed homestead at Myendetta Station, Bakers Bend, Shire of Murweh, Queensland, Australia. It was designed by Robin Dods and built by Gibbs Brothers of Charleville. It was added to the Queensland Heritage Register on 2 December 2013.

== History ==
Myendetta (1910), located 30 kilometres (19 mi) south-west of Charleville, was designed by eminent architect Robert Smith (Robin) Dods for grazier Charles Decimus Edmund Francis.

Pastoral settlement of the Warrego district in which Myendetta is located commenced in the early 1860s when large pastoral leases were taken up. Survey of the town of Charleville occurred in 1867 and Murweh Divisional Board was established in 1879. The town's growth and importance in the Warrego district increased when it served as the terminus of the Western railway line from 1888 until 1898, before the rail line was extended to Cunnamulla. The town developed as a major service centre for the surrounding pastoral industry and Cobb & Co established stables and a factory there for the construction of mail coaches. On 21 March 1894 the town of Charleville was proclaimed a separate municipality, the Borough of Charleville (from 1903, Town of Charleville).

Charles Francis, born in 1860, was the youngest son of a prominent Cambridge legal family and was educated at Eton and Oxford. He migrated to South Australia c. 1880 following an elder brother and worked his way north to the Charleville area. The first evidence of Francis in the Charleville district is in September 1887 when two selections on the road from Charleville to Roma were transferred to him from Keyran Ryan. In 1890 Francis was the lessee of Portion 18v, parish of Dillalah, County of Palmer (later Burrandilla). In the ensuing years he aggregated a large grazing property by taking over the leases of surrounding blocks of land and selecting land. Over time he built up a holding of 10 contiguous blocks totalling almost 46,000 acres (19,000 ha) which were bounded by the Warrego River at its conjunction with the Ward River on the east. The land was used for sheep and cattle raising. In 1901 Francis married Marian Anne Challacombe and a daughter and son were born in 1904 and 1907 respectively. He became a leading member of the community and served as a Justice of the Peace and Magistrate from c. 1915. On the death of CDE Francis in 1929 the property passed to only son Clement Edmund Francis and remained in the family's ownership until 2010.

Family lore tells that Francis received an inheritance of £3,000 following his mother's death, which "enabled him to build something of quality". Circa 1906 Francis decided to build a new homestead on his large property, away from the flood-prone Warrego River, and chose Dods as the architect. To enable the new construction, a 1,890-foot-deep (580 m) artesian bore was sunk in 1908 near the future homestead and around the same time a woolshed and shearers' quarters were erected.

The reason for the selection of Dods as the architect for Myendetta is unknown. Francis would have been aware of Dods as he designed a homestead at nearby Augathella in 1903 and in 1906, as Anglican Diocesan architect, he designed the alterations to All Saints Church, Charleville, as well as the new church hall, built in 1910. Dods' working drawings for Myendetta date from March 1908.

Dods (1868–1920) was a New Zealand-born architect who lived briefly in Britain before coming to Brisbane in the 1870s. He later trained as an architect in Scotland and England under a number of esteemed architects who were working in the Arts and Crafts idiom. His architectural career began in Edinburgh in 1886, articled with architects Hay & Henderson. He attended evening classes at the Edinburgh Architectural Association until 1890 and formed a lasting friendship with (Sir) Robert Lorimer (1864–1929), eminent Scottish architect and fellow proponent of Arts and Crafts. In 1890 Dods moved to London, where he worked with the Fortifications Branch of the War Office and in the office of notable architect (Sir) Aston Webb. In 1891 he was admitted to the Royal Institute of British Architects and travelled in Italy. In 1894 Dods visited his mother in Brisbane and while there won a competition for a nurses home at the Brisbane General Hospital. He returned to Brisbane in 1896 and started in practice with architect Francis Hall as Hall & Dods. Dods has been acknowledged as "one of the most significant early 20th century Australian architects" and unique as a rare practitioner of the Arts and Crafts style in Queensland.

Arts and Crafts was an international design movement flourishing between 1860 and 1910, its influence continued into the 1930s. It was led by artist and writer William Morris and architect Charles Voysey and was inspired by the writings of John Ruskin and Augustus Pugin. The style championed traditional craftsmanship using simple forms and often applied medieval, romantic or folk styles of decoration. Importantly, it valued local variations in traditions so that good design would have relevance within its context. Arts and Crafts architecture is characterised by solidity and heaviness through well-proportioned solid forms, wide porches and prominent steep roofs. The texture of ordinary materials is expressed in the detailing and building composition is asymmetrical.

The practice of Hall & Dods was the most influential source of modern design in Brisbane, producing a wide range of accomplished buildings, and was credited with achieving an "architectural revolution" in Brisbane. Dods was responsible for most of the design within the firm, integrating contemporary British design philosophies with the traditions of Queensland housing and the requirements of a subtropical climate, and producing practical, attractive, and finely detailed houses. The partnership ended in 1913, when Dods left to practice in Sydney. Dods died prematurely in 1920.

Dods' residential work employed local building techniques combined with a sophisticated discipline and a common-sense response to climate. Dods' houses were mostly built of timber with detailing that was a celebration of craftsmanship. The most noticeable characteristic of his Queensland houses (built between 1896 and 1917) was a general feeling of solidity and substance. This was the result of a number of design decisions including: designing a generous roof (often the largest element) continuous over the verandah and over a lower, rear washhouse. The roof was always simple in geometry and often finished with terracotta tiles, flat shingles or pan-and-tile profile, flat iron sheeting with a prominent rolled joint. Corrugated iron was only used where it was necessary to reduce the cost. Generally low-set, the houses often had an enclosed or screened understorey to give the house a visually solid base. Individual elements were oversized to appear substantial as if under heavy loads. Bold, dark, earthy colours, darkly stained timber, rough-sawn weatherboards with mitred corners, roughcast rendering and face brickwork in dark colours were used to give the house a weighty gravity. The building materials and finishes were chosen to allow the building to mellow over time, providing it with a well-established appearance.

The house designs take a formalist approach to planning including formal entry halls and traditional planning arrangements. The plans were generated through a consideration of aspect, with living spaces well-oriented and internal layouts permitting cross ventilation. They are also notable for their informal spaces, a particular feature being the inclusion of generous verandah piazzas. The plans respond to the social needs of the clients in an honest and functional way. The houses were often provided with generous, considered service spaces including back halls and wash houses. The health and comfort of the occupants were major considerations. Ventilation devices included wide window and door openings, ventilated gables and ridges, and ventilation fleches. Piazzas were generous, allowing comfortably furnished, semi-outdoor living. Operable shading and enclosure of the piazza was sometimes achieved by adding timber vertical louvres above the verandah handrail, creating a room habitable in most weather. Interiors included fine decorative timber joinery and panelling. Fireplace surrounds and built-in cupboards were also a feature.

The composition of facades and circulation routes are a more nuanced element of Dods' houses and highlights his originality and artistic skill. Facades often only implied symmetry. Entries were often off-centre or perpendicular, emphasised by wide and expressive entry stairs. Projecting bay windows and corner fireplaces were recurrent elements.

Dods designed gardens as a setting for the house, a practice more common in Britain than in Queensland. They featured formal parterre gardens, terraces and walls, flower beds, tennis courts, hedges, topiaries, flowering ornamental trees, and geometric path and lawn layouts. Garden furniture and structures were designed including seats, pergolas, trellises, fences and gates.

Myendetta is an example of the homesteads built by Queensland's most successful pastoralists. As funds became available over time, they built comfortable, architect-designed homes or extended their earlier homesteads into residences more befitting their status. Most of these grand homesteads were built in the prosperous settled districts of south-east Queensland - Darling Downs, Moreton and Wide Bay Burnett districts, where pastoralists held freehold title; relatively few were built in the far west where land was leasehold.

Between 1901 and 1913 Dods designed and built six homesteads for rural properties - Langlo Downs, Augathella (1903, destroyed by fire); extension to Nindooinbah Homestead, Beaudesert (1908); Ringsfield, Nanango (1908); Wyambyn, Beaudesert () (1909); Myendetta, Charleville (1910); and Kengoon, Kalbar (1913). These were large dwellings that often formed the centre of groups of outbuildings. Their garden layouts were also an important feature.

Rural homesteads built in Queensland in the early part of the 20th century were large homes, often on elevated (flood-free) sites with a scenic outlook, surrounded by gardens. As well as those listed above, Marshlands near Hivesville (1910) designed by Hall & Dods (but not believed to be Dods' design) was built during this period, as was Hidden Vale near Grandchester (Eaton & Bates, 1903).

Myendetta was built by Gibbs Brothers, Charleville builders and contractors who also constructed the FDG Stanley-designed Charleville School of Arts. Myendetta Station's vegetation was mulga scrub, unsuitable as a building material, so all building materials had to be brought in. Weatherboards and framing were hardwood while the v-jointed walls, floors and ceilings were hoop pine.

When completed in 1910 Myendetta was a "state of the art" home complete with electricity generated by its own generator powered by water flow from the artesian bore. Hydro-electricity powered by artesian flow was a new technology pioneered at Thargomindah in 1898 (the first town in Australia to have hydroelectric power). This preceded the electrification of Charleville by 13 years. The house was flyscreened and well ventilated. An outbuilding was equipped with a cold room, insulated with charcoal and sealed with a layer of cork then cooled by air forced through water-soaked hessian curtains by an electric fan.

The house was approached from the west along a curve around the south to an entry porch on the south-east. It was rectangular in plan with a six-foot (1.8 m) wide cruciform corridor separating four banks of rooms 14 feet (4.3 m) wide. The house accommodated a large dining room, sitting room, drawing room, sewing room, a master bedroom with ensuite bathroom, four other bedrooms, a second bathroom, and a school room. At the juncture of the cruciform hallways was a central octagonal hall with four semicircular archways, one over each of the corridors. A verandah encircled the house and was generally six feet six inches (1.98 m) wide. It widened to 12 feet (3.7 m) to create piazzas in two locations: outside the sitting and dining rooms, and outside the school room. The entry projected to form an even larger verandah space, approximately 16 feet (4.9 m) wide. The house had few windows (only two fixed casements to the sitting room); rather, it had pairs of six-foot-wide (1.8 m) French doors with glazed fanlights and gauzed timber-framed flyscreen doors to the exterior.

Linked by a covered verandah to the north-eastern end of the house was a semi-detached service wing that accommodated a kitchen, a wash house, and a servants' room or large store room. The wing had a north-western verandah approximately 8 feet (2.4 m) wide accessed from the large kitchen via French doors. The wash house was at ground level reached via a short stair. The wash house was open on one side to the yard. Six water tanks were located nearby. Early photographs show that the service wing was largely screened from the entrance view.

In an almost featureless landscape, the roof, which was the largest element with a massive 40-degree pitch that flattened to 25 degrees over the verandah made a powerful visual statement. Under the roofing iron, the roof framing was sheeted with 1-inch (25 mm) pine boards giving the structure great strength as well as a degree of insulation. The roof apex had a decorative ventilator and elsewhere the roof had ventilated ridges. The verandah posts and beams were oversized and held large brackets. The composition of large roof and oversized structural elements imbued a robust nature to the homestead. The verandahs were without balustrade, giving an air of relaxed habitation and a strong connection between the house and the landscape. The whole composition was further enhanced by the placement of water tanks on stands of varying height that were fed from either the bore or rainwater from the roof.

Analysis of Myendetta reveals Dods' deft architectural response to the harsh, variable climate of Charleville, which is relatively dry and hot with large temperature variations annually and diurnally. The plan layout is determined by the position of the sun at the time of day that the room would be used. Used primarily in the morning, the school room and adjacent piazza are on the south-western corner of the building, away from the north-eastern, morning sun. Conversely, the dining room and adjacent piazza, primarily used in the evening, are on the north-eastern corner of the building away from the south-western afternoon sun. The entire main building is surrounded by a verandah, sheltering all external walls from the sun and the vast, ventilated roof space, almost twice the height of the interior rooms, provided a huge sun shield. The wide, straight halls funnelled breezes through the house. All rooms opened onto the hall on one side and the verandah on the other with doors and operable fanlights to allow access to any breeze regardless of its direction.

Dods' colour scheme for the house was dramatic, consisting of large areas of dark, rich colours contrasted by feature elements in bright, light colours. The scheme also included sophisticated painting techniques and stencilling internally.

Myendetta included other elements designed by Dods. To the north-east of the service wing was a small, detached building containing a dairy and butcher shop, to the south-west of the house was a grass tennis court, and to the south-east was a rose garden and orchard.

Myendetta was altered very little after construction. After the bore ceased to flow in 1971 the power supply was replaced by a diesel generator and by 1976 power was obtained from the mains. Some time after 1950 the tennis court was moved from the south-western side of the house to the south-eastern, replacing the rose garden and citrus orchard. At the same time a timber-battened fern house was added between the house and the service wing. In 2002 early colour schemes were found to survive under the existing paint scheme. In 2003 Myendetta was open for tours displaying historic household items and explaining the history of the station. In 2007 the service wing was renovated, including the addition of reverse cycle air-conditioning.

In 2010, the Australian Institute of Architects added Myendetta to its list of nationally significant 20th century architecture, namely the Institute's National Register of Significant Twentieth Century Architecture. It is one of sixteen 20th century residential places which form the Institute's nomination to the International Union of Architects' (UIA) World Register of Significant 20th Century Australian Architecture and to the Australian Government National Heritage List.

The property was purchased by the current owner in 2010 and in 2013 the homestead is used as a manager's residence.

== Description ==
Myendetta Homestead is a substantial timber homestead on a large property (15,981.036 hectares (39,490.00 acres)) of flat, lightly wooded land, 30 kilometres (19 mi) south-west of Charleville.

The house sits within the remnants of a house garden that in 2013 is defined by a lawn. The front of the house faces south-east onto a flat grassed area, once a tennis court. It is a single-storeyed, low-set timber-framed building with an encircling verandah and a semi-detached service wing to the north.

The house has a very large, steep hipped roof clad with corrugated metal sheets, a ventilated ridge cap, and a decorative ventilating fleche. Under the roof cladding is a layer of insulating timber boards. The roof is continuous over the verandahs but at a shallower pitch. The verandahs are without balustrade and the rectangular timber verandah posts are turned on their side to present the larger dimension to the elevation, thereby creating a robust visual impression with the posts supporting overscaled brackets. The verandah walls are single-skin, v-jointed boards with exposed, stop-chamfered framing. The verandah floor is wide timber boards. The verandah ceiling is unlined in places, leaving the timber board roof insulation visible, and in others the ceiling is lined with a further layer of timber boards.

The south-east-facing entry is prominent, sheltered under its own projecting hip roof and is reached by short flight of concrete stairs. The verandah width is generally 6 feet 6 inches (1.98 m) but enlarges to 12 feet (3.7 m) wide in two locations - at the entry and along the front of the sitting and dining rooms; and on the south-west outside the school room.

The house layout is divided into quarters by a central, cruciform hallway. At the juncture of this hallway is an octagonal hall with four semicircular archways of decoratively moulded timber, one over each of the corridors. The house has only two windows - fixed casements in the sitting room. All rooms have wide French windows with broad fanlights opening onto the verandah with timber framed flyscreen doors.

Generally, the interior has clear finished timber board floors, single-skin timber partitions with moulded timber skirtings, belt rails, picture rails, architraves, and cornices. The ceilings are v-jointed boards. There are built-in timber cupboards throughout the house. The interior retains an original light fitting in the dining room and an original electricity board survives.

The service wing is attached to the north-eastern verandah of the main house. It was extensively renovated both externally and internally in recent years and now contains a large commercial scaled kitchen. It has a hipped roof clad with corrugated metal sheets and a ventilated ridge cap. The verandah is shielded from the north-western sun by timber battens fixed in a chevron pattern.

A detached building immediately north of the service wing is the dairy/butcher. It is a timber building with a steep, hipped roof clad with corrugated metal sheets and a ventilated ridge cap. The walls are clad with weatherboards. There is no documented evidence to suggest Robin Dods was the architect. Other alterations to the original building include:

- updated bathroom fittings and fixtures
- replacement of original timber stumps under the main floor structure with steel posts and concrete footings
- new sewerage system.

Other outbuildings are not of cultural heritage significance.

== Heritage listing ==
Myendetta Homestead was listed on the Queensland Heritage Register on 2 December 2013 having satisfied the following criteria.

The place is important in demonstrating the evolution or pattern of Queensland's history.

Myendetta (1910) is important in illustrating the contribution of notable architect, Robert Smith (Robin) Dods, to the evolution of Queensland architecture.

The homestead is also important in demonstrating the evolution of climatically adapted timber housing in Queensland. It is an exceptional example of design responses to extreme climatic conditions and originally incorporated hydro-electric power.

It is a highly intact, representative example of the substantial homesteads built on pastoral land.

The place demonstrates rare, uncommon or endangered aspects of Queensland's cultural heritage.

As one of only six Queensland homesteads designed by architect Robin Dods, Myendetta is a rare and intact example of his homestead designs.

The place is important in demonstrating the principal characteristics of a particular class of cultural places.

Myendetta is an intact example of the residential work of Dods. Designed in an Arts and Crafts idiom, the low-set timber house has deliberately oversized timber elements and openings; verandah piazza; steep dominant roof; finely detailed, built-in timber furniture; a well-considered service zone; and an interior layout that optimises cross ventilation and solar orientation.

The place is important because of its aesthetic significance.

The low-set house with dominant, large roof, generous verandahs and garden stands dramatically in the extensive, flat landscape.

A sense of robust, rural domesticity is engendered by its wide verandahs and piazzas without balustrade; spacious, well-ventilated living rooms; and the use of oversized elements, such as the hunkering roof, large, closely spaced verandah posts and large openings.

Highly intact, Myendetta is important for its Arts and Crafts aesthetic, notably for its fine craftsmanship, high quality materials and skilful arrangement of informal and formal living spaces.
