= Robin Dods =

New Zealand-born Australian architect (1868 - 1920)

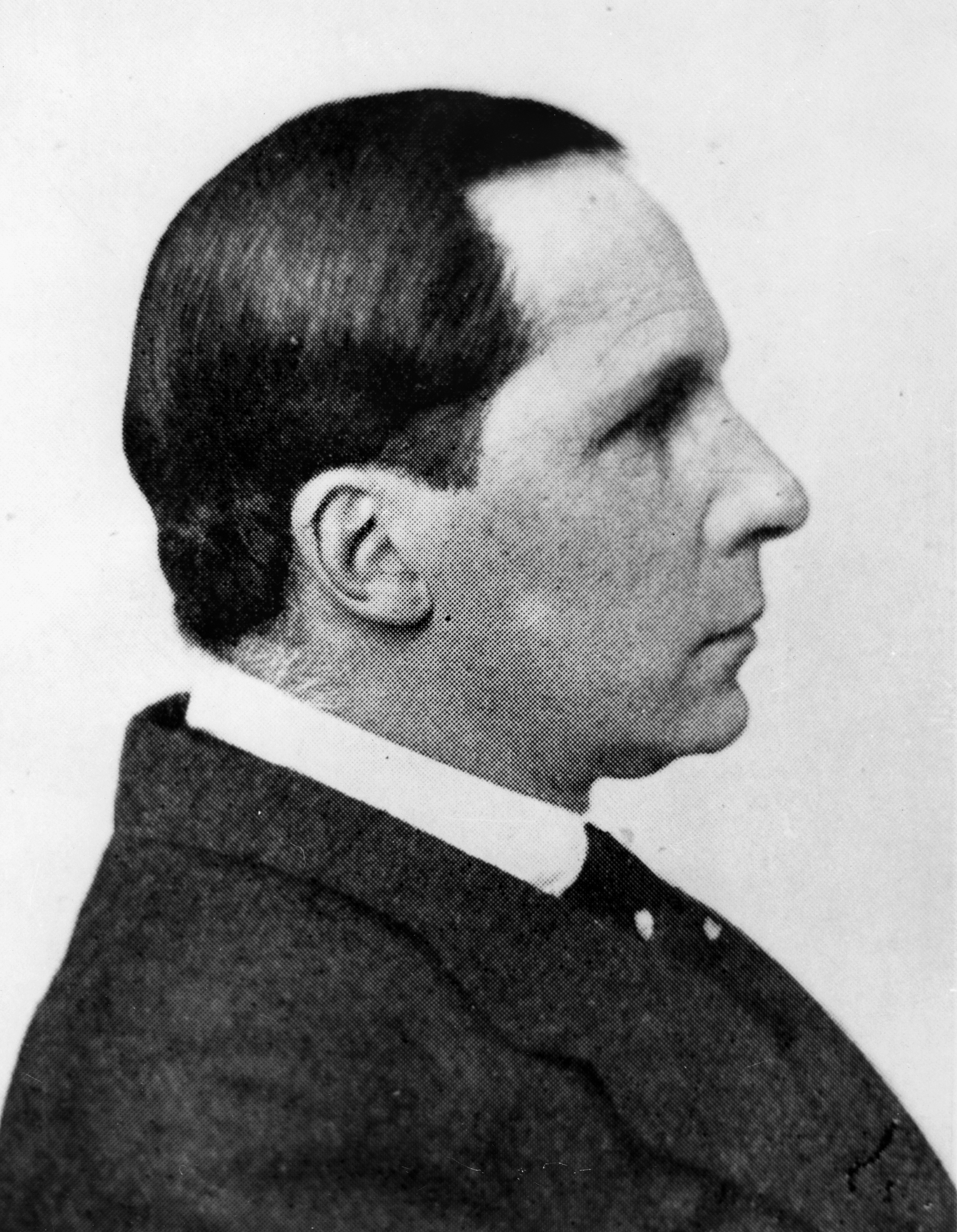
- Born: Robert Smith Dods; 9 June 1868; Dunedin, New Zealand
- Died: 23 July 1920 (aged 52); Edgecliff, Sydney, New South Wales, Australia
- Occupation: Architect
- Children: Lorimer Dods
- Practice: Hay & Henderson (Edinburgh); Sir Aston Webb (London); Hall & Dods (Brisbane); Spain, Cosh & Dods (Sydney)

Robert Smith (Robin) Dods (9 June 1868 – 23 July 1920) was a New Zealand-born Australian architect. Over the course of his career, he worked for Hay & Henderson in Edinburgh and Aston Webb in London, later becoming a partner in Hall & Dods (Brisbane) and Spain, Cosh & Dods (Sydney).

== Early life and education ==
Robert Smith Dods, known as Robin, was born in Dunedin, New Zealand on 9 June 1868. His parents were Robert Smith Dods (a wholesale grocer) and Elizabeth Gray, née Stodart. His parents both came from Edinburgh, Scotland. However, the family did not stay long in New Zealand and returned to Edinburgh in the early 1870s, where his father died in 1876. His mother Elizabeth then immigrated to Brisbane. On the voyage she met Charles Ferdinard Marks, a physician, whom she married in Brisbane in 1879.

Dods was the brother of solicitor Stodart Dods and Queensland Medical Officer Espie Dods. He had three half-brothers and a half-sister from his mother's second marriage to Charles Marks. They included Alexander Marks and Edward Marks.

Dods was educated at Brisbane Grammar School.

== Career ==
Dods worked for the following architectural firms:

- Hay & Henderson (Edinburgh)
- Sir Aston Webb (London)
- Hall & Dods (Brisbane)
- Spain, Cosh & Dods (Sydney)

Dods' period of activity in Brisbane between 1896 and 1916 place him firmly within what is now known as the Federation period. His work however has its origins clearly in the Arts and Crafts movement which swept Britain from the 1870s. Its influence was felt there right up until the beginning of World War I.

Robin Dods was a gifted and capable designer, and was well connected. His surgeon stepfather, Dr Charles Ferdinand Marks, and his uncle, James Stodart, were both members of the Queensland Parliament, in its Upper and Lower houses respectively. Like them, he was admitted into the Protestant power base of the Queensland Club. This was a great asset in building a successful career. Dods was also a founding member of the Brisbane Golf Club and designed its first and second club houses.

Hall & Dods were architects in Queensland for several national enterprises including the AMP Society, the Bank of New South Wales, the New Zealand Insurance Co, JC Hutton & Co, the Australian Mercantile Land and Finance Company, the Engineering Supply Company of Australia as well as several local department stores. For such clients there was the likelihood of repeat commissions, many of which eventuated.

Within the original firm John Hall began in 1864, and the next incarnation, there was an established client base, although many new clients were secured by Dods. Through Dods’ links with the medical profession, Hall & Dods became architects for both of the major hospitals in Brisbane at the time. For the Brisbane General Hospital, where Dods’ stepfather was visiting surgeon and his uncle was chairman of the Hospital Board, Hall & Dods were commissioned for some 10 projects. The Sisters of Mercy also employed Hall & Dods to design a new hospital at South Brisbane — the Mater Misericordiae Hospital. From 1908 the first four buildings were designed and built under the firm's supervision.

An ambitious chapel for the sisters was also designed but not built. Dods designed most of the projects emanating from the partnership. These included a number of modern and distinctive houses in timber for a handful of doctors and other professional clients (often also his friends), several graziers, as well as private residences for his commercial clients. It was through the design of these houses that his reputation largely survives.

Dods visited the Continent in 1891 for a study tour of Italy. It was in Naples that he met Charles Rennie Mackintosh, who was also travelling to fulfil the terms of the Alexander Thomson Scholarship which he had won the previous year. Macintosh was destined to be recognised as one of the pioneers of the Modern Movement, and this meeting could have influenced Dods' architectural outlook.

Robin Dods died on 23 July 1920, and was buried in the South Head Cemetery. At the age of 52, a busy and useful life was thus cut short, and a distinguished architect passed on, to leave in Queensland a legacy of outstanding achievement in the development of its architecture.

== Practice in Sydney ==
Although he had been so busy and successful in Brisbane, Dods felt that his architectural future in this city was limited.

His ambition made him anxious to break into the larger commercial work offering in the south. In 1913 he terminated his partnership with Francis Hall and went to Sydney to join the firm of Spain & Cosh. The firm became Spain, Cosh & Dods from 1914 until 1920.

Little is now known of Dods' architectural activity in Sydney. He built for himself a house at Edgecliff, described by a contemporary as "charming in its quiet Georgian character, well planned, and forming an attractive setting for the antique furniture he had collected for many years." The Newcastle Club, from the offices of Spain and Cosh, is certainly Dods' work, as it exhibits many features characteristic of his Queensland domestic architecture. The largest known work in Sydney that was substantially of Dods' design was the South British Insurance Co. Ltd. building, at the corner of O'Connell and Hunter Streets.

== Domestic work ==
"A modern house is like matrimony in this, that it is most frequently assailed by those who have failed to attain it for themselves."

Robin Dods achieved early recognition of his domestic work. His houses, when built, were soon noticed and admired. His clients were evidently people with means, since a great bulk of his Brisbane houses were in the wealthy suburbs of Clayfield and New Farm. There is also a Dods house in Charleville and another in Reynella, South Australia. In two known cases only did he design cottage-type houses. These were two groups of three, and evidently designed for clients who were investing in real estate.

Designing to suit the climate was a primary consideration with him. Planning suited the prevailing north-east breeze, and a generous area of wide verandah shaded the living and bedroom areas of his houses. His belief that an insulating layer of air over the house was essential gave rise to the characteristic high-pitched roof ventilated by gablets and neat lanterns.

The Robin Dods Award for Residential Architecture – Houses (New) was established in his honour by the Queensland chapter of the Australian Institute of Architects.

== Commercial work ==
As with his domestic work, Dods' commercial architecture is easily recognised. Again wherever possible he attempted to design for the climate, and his best work shows spacious planning and good ventilation. Soaring real estate values have made much of his planning now seem wasteful, but in any evaluation of his work it must be remembered that he worked in a comparatively small city whose commercial expansion has exceeded even the dreams of the then most visionary businessmen.

Even in Brisbane, commercial buildings have a transitory life, so that of the many buildings designed by the architect a number of them have been demolished, added to, or altered out of all recognition. By and large, Dods' commercial work was not inspiring, but several of his buildings were significant, advanced for their time, and well worthy of further study.

== Personal life and death ==
Dods was the father of eminent physician Lorimer Dods.

He died at Edgecliff, Sydney on 23 July 1920.

== Works ==
His architectural works include:

- 4BC House 30–38 Wharf St, Brisbane City, Queensland (destroyed)
- Albury Civic Fire Station, 565 Kiewa Street, Albury, New South Wales
- All Hallows Convent and School, 547 Ann Street, Fortitude Valley, Queensland
- All Saints Memorial Church, Tamrookum Church Road, Tamrookum, Queensland
- Australian Mercantile Land & Finance Woolstores, 34 Vernon Terrace, Teneriffe, Queensland
- Brisbane General Hospital Group 20–30 Bowen Bridge Road, Herston, Queensland
- Brisbane Grammar School (Honour Boards), 24 Gregory Terrace, Spring Hill, Queensland
- Brunoy, 144–146 Beecroft Road, Beecroft, New South Wales
- Church House, 417 Ann Street, Brisbane
- Corbett and Son Store, 446–452 Brunswick Street, Fortitude Valley, Queensland
- Cressbrook Homestead, off Cressbrook-Caboombah Road, Toogoolawah, Queensland
- Eagle Farm Racecourse (St Leger Stand), 230 Lancaster Road, Ascot, Queensland
- Espie Dods House, 97 Wickham Terrace, Spring Hill, Queensland
- Fenton and Garden, 8 Albert Street, Edgecliff, New South Wales
- Fire Station (Former), 932–934 Bourke Street, Zetland, New South Wales
- Franklyn Vale Homestead (summerhouse only), Franklin Vale Road, Grandchester, Queensland
- Glengariff (1907 additions), 5 Derby Street, Hendra, Queensland
- Guildford Fire Station, 263 Guildford Road, Guildford, New South Wales
- Johnson's Building, 64–70 Palmerin Street, Warwick, Queensland
- Killara, 92 Windermere Road, Ascot, Queensland
- Kitawah, 59 Heath St, East Brisbane, Queensland
- Lady Lamington Nurses Home, 282 Herston Road, Herston, Queensland
- Lyndhurst, 3 London Road, Clayfield, Queensland
- Manumbah, 64 Massey Street, Ascot, Queensland
- Mardoc Building, Federal Street, Narrogin, Western Australia
- Mark Foys Warehouse (Former), 133 Goulburn Street, Surry Hills, New South Wales
- Maryborough City Hall, 388 Kent Street, Maryborough, Queensland
- Mater Misericordiae Private and Former Public Hospitals, Raymond Terrace, South Brisbane, Queensland
- Mount Carmel Convent, 199 Bay Terrace, Wynnum, Queensland
- Mudgee Post Office, 80 Market Street, Mudgee, New South Wales
- Myendetta Homestead Myendetta Station, Bakers Bend, Shire of Murweh, Queensland
- Ringsfield House, Nanango, Queensland
- Nindooinbah Homestead (1906 extensions), Nindooinbah House Road, Beaudesert, Queensland
- Old Bishopsbourne, 233 Milton Road, Milton, Queensland
- Old Bishopsbourne Chapel, 233 Milton Road, Milton, Queensland
- Ralahyne (1904 alterations), 40 Enderley Road, Clayfield, Queensland
- Rangemoor Circa 1910, 165 Adelaide Street East Clayfield, Queensland
- Narallan, Abbott Street, 41 Abbott Street, New Farm, Queensland
- Ruddle's Building, 327 Brunswick Street Mall, Fortitude Valley, Queensland
- Shafston House, 23 Castlebar St, Kangaroo Point, Queensland
- St Andrew's Anglican Church, Mangerton St, Toogoolawah, Queensland
- St Brigid's Church, 78 Musgrave Road, Red Hill, Queensland
- St Mark's Anglican Church, Junner Street, Dunwich, Queensland
- St John's Cathedral, 401–413 Ann Street, Brisbane
- TC Beirne Department Store, 28 Duncan Street, Fortitude Valley, Queensland
- The Deanery (1909–10 verandahs), 417 Ann Street, Brisbane
- The Newcastle Club, 40 Newcomen Street, Newcastle, New South Wales
- Theosophical Society Building, 355 Wickham Terrace, Spring Hill, Queensland
- Turrawan, 8 London Road, Clayfield, Queensland
- Wairuna, 27 Hampstead Road, Highgate Hill, Queensland
- Wattlebrae Hospital Group (former), 30 Bowen Bridge Road, Herston, Queensland
- Webber House, 417–19 Ann Street, Brisbane
- Willoughby Fire Station 53 Laurel Street, Willoughby, New South Wales

He designed the school badge for Somerville House, a Brisbane private school in 1902.

== Styles ==
He built in the following architectural styles:

- Federation Gothic, Arts and Crafts and Bungalow
- Inter-War Georgian Revival

== Gallery ==
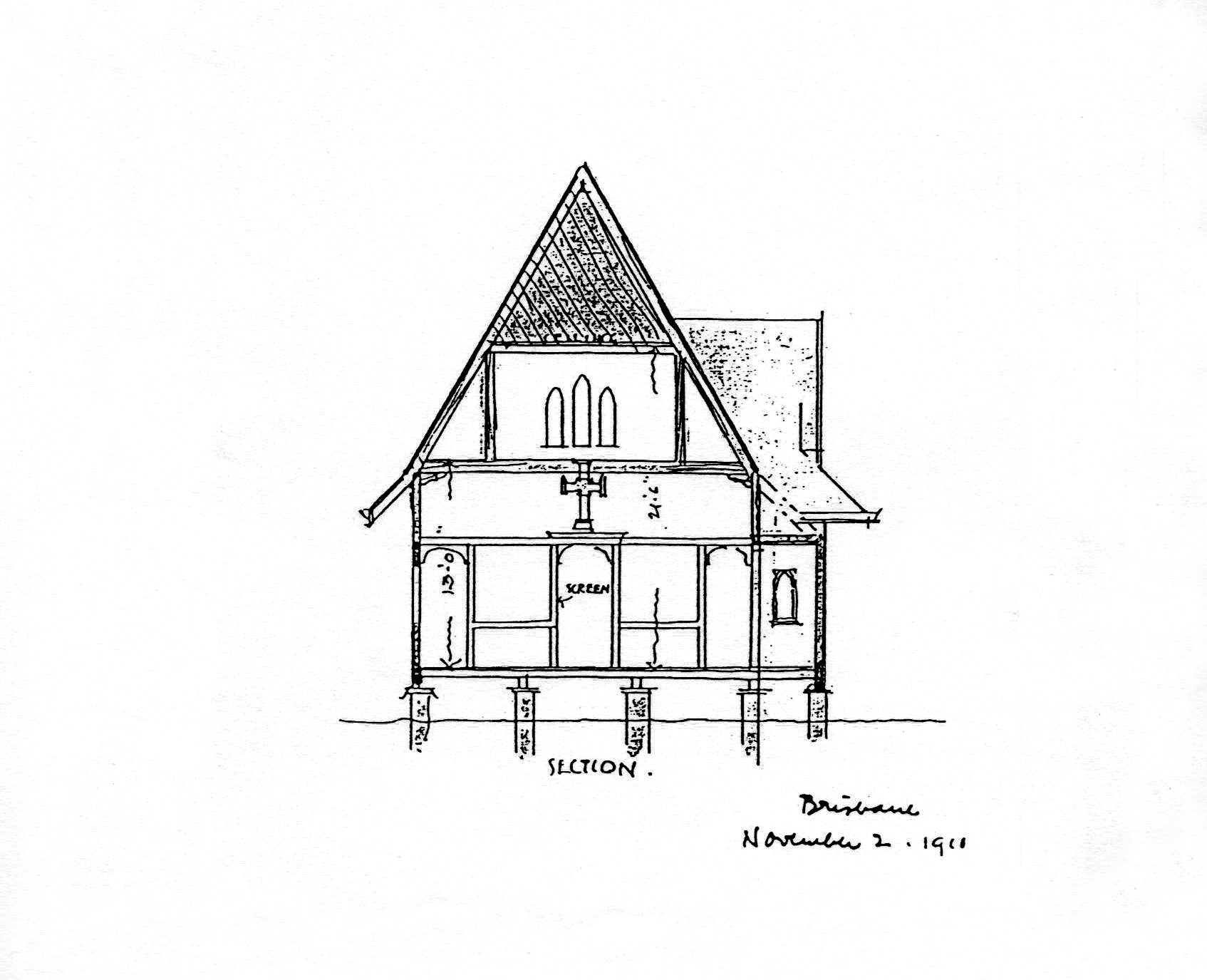
Robin Dods' architectural drawing of St. Andrew's Anglican Church, Toogoolawah

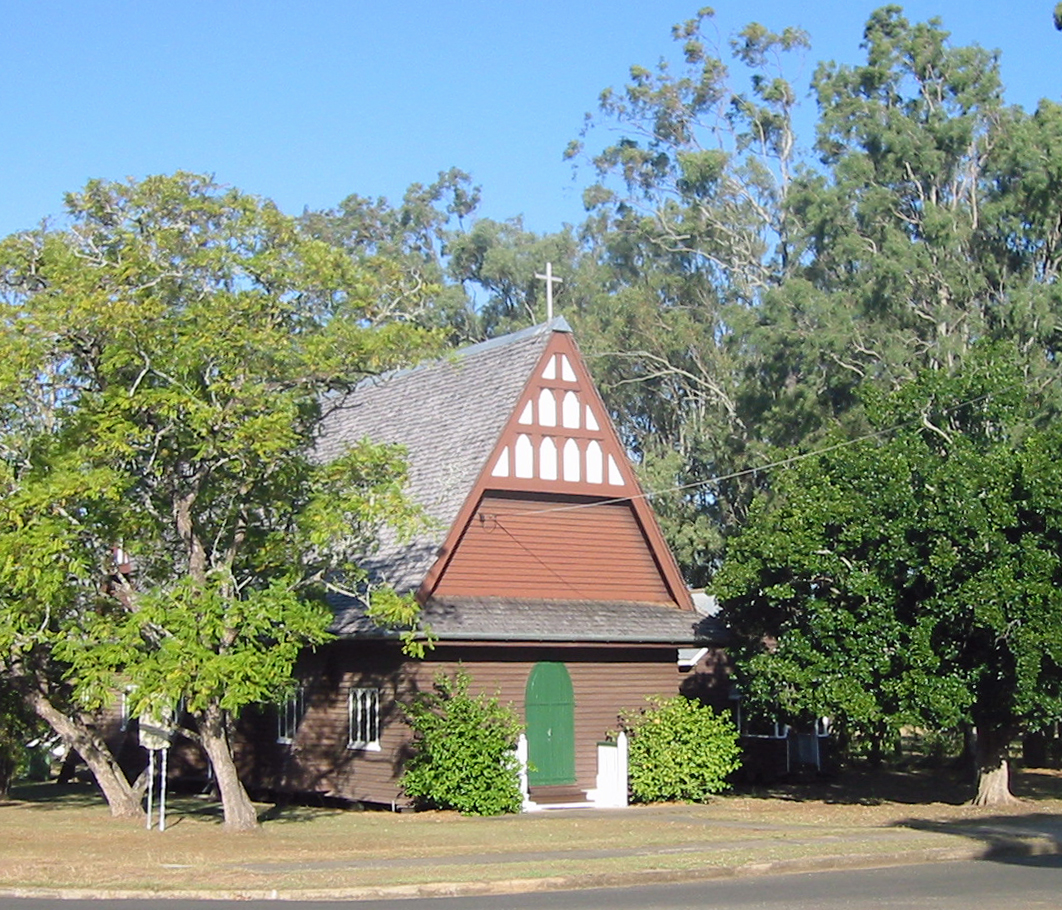
St. Andrew's Anglican Church, Toogoolawah

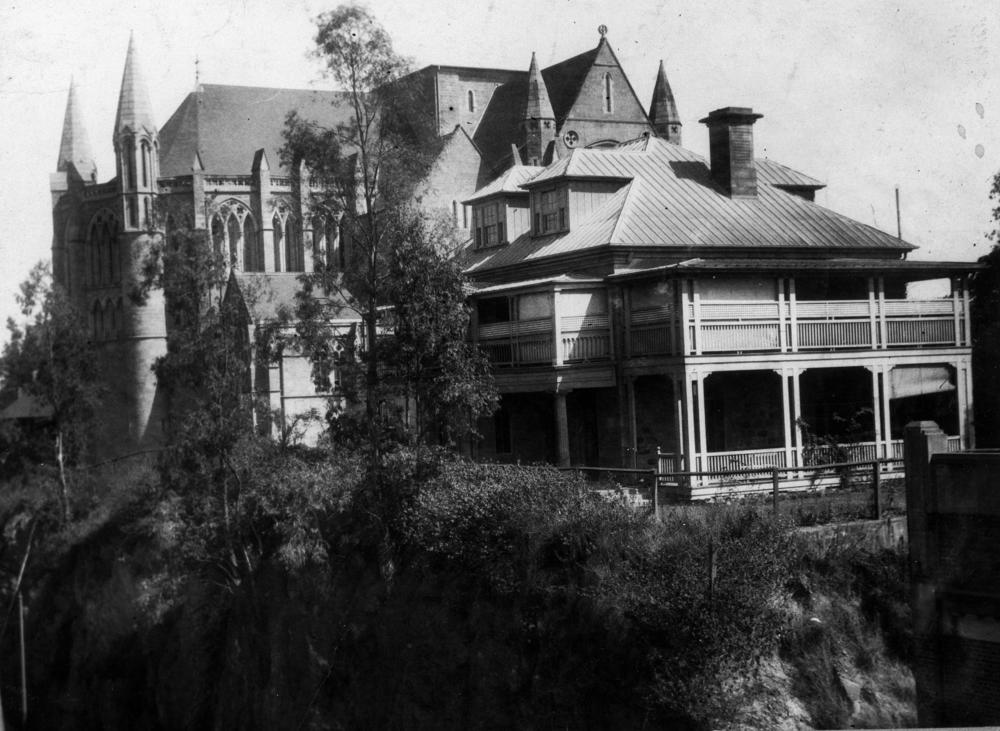
St John's Cathedral and the Deanery taken from a north-easterly aspect in about 1928

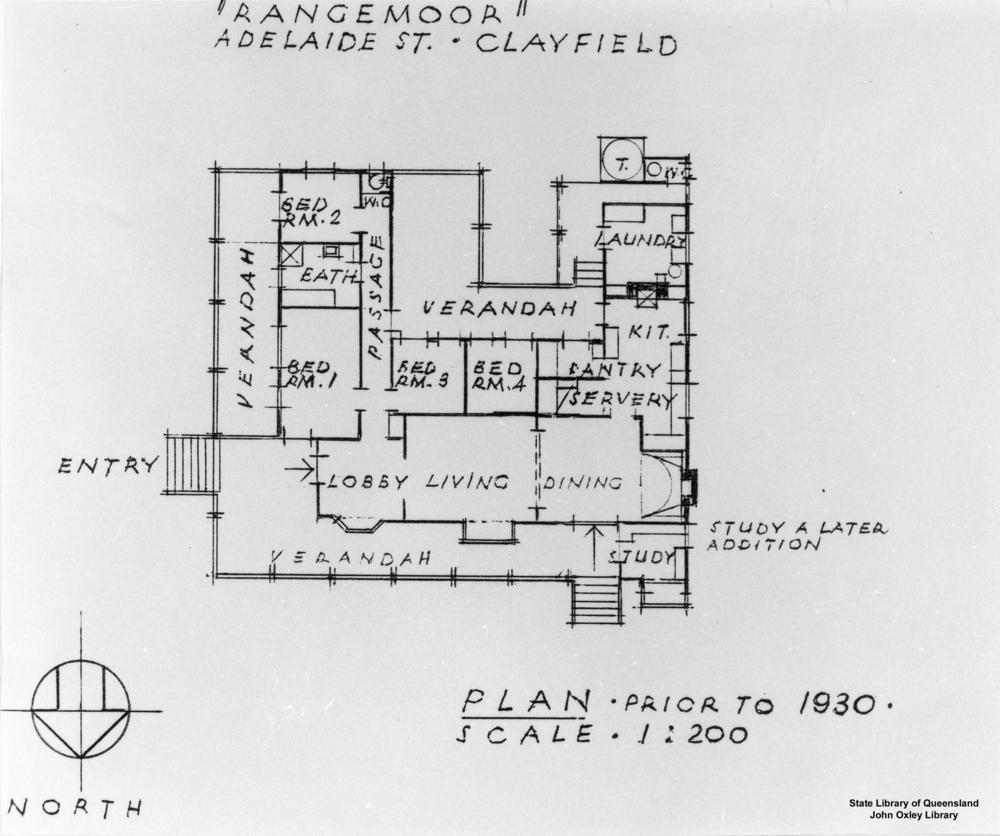
Architectural drawing of the house 'Rangemoor'
