= Kitawah =

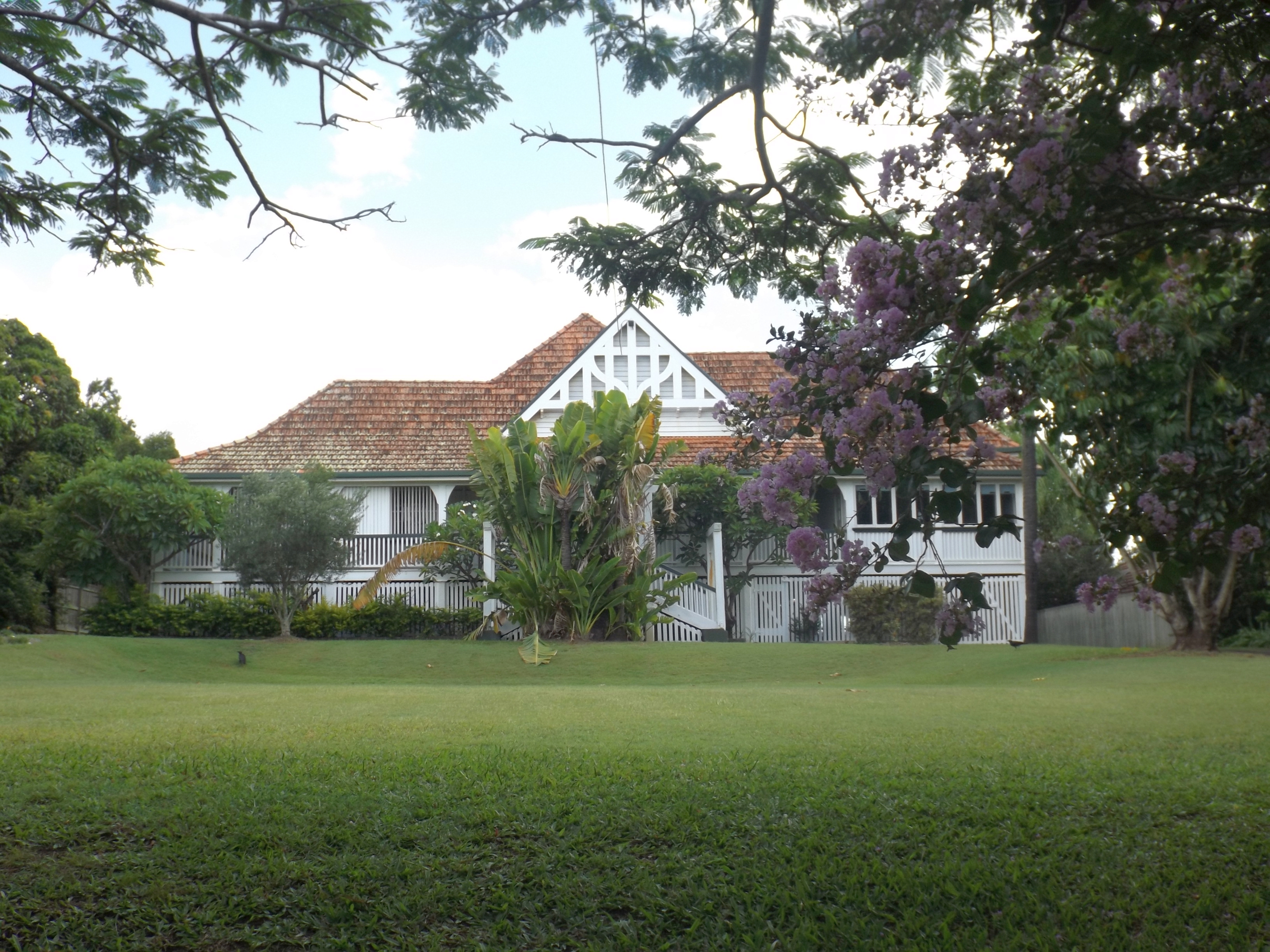
- Residence in 2015

- Location within Queensland Location within Australia
- 27.4807°S 153.0506°E
- Location: 59 Heath Street, East Brisbane, Queensland, Australia

History
- Design period: 1900–1914 (early 20th century)
- Built: 1911
- Built for: Llewellyn Stephens

Site notes
- Architect: Robin Dods

Queensland Heritage Register
- Official name: Kitawah, Wewak
- Type: state heritage (built, landscape)
- Designated: 23 June 2000
- Reference no.: 601023
- Significant period: 1910s (fabric, historical)
- Significant components: staircase/stairs – divided, service wing, dormitory wing, tennis court site, driveway, residential accommodation – main house, garden/grounds

Kitawah is a heritage-listed villa at 59 Heath Street, East Brisbane, Queensland, Australia. It was designed by Robin Dods and built in 1911 for Llewellyn Stephens. It is also known as Wewak. It was added to the Queensland Heritage Register on 23 June 2000.

== History ==
Kitawah is a substantial timber residence constructed in 1911 for Brisbane solicitor Llewellyn Stephens and designed by prominent Queensland architect Robin Dods (of Hall and Dods). Kitawah is located upon a large block in East Brisbane that was originally part of Eastern Suburban Allotment 82, an area of 34 acres (14 ha) 1 rood 8 perches (1,200 m^{2}), initially acquired by William Wilson in December 1853. Stephens purchased subdivision "H", on the corner of Barker Street and Heath Street in 1909 and commissioned Dods to design a home for his young family.

Stephens was the eleventh child of Thomas Blacket Stephens, a well-known figure in early Brisbane. Amongst other achievements, Thomas Blacket Stephens was the second Mayor of Brisbane, a Member of the Legislative Council, Colonial Treasurer, Secretary of Public Lands and proprietor of the Brisbane Courier. Llewellyn Stephens was born at the family home Cumbooqepa (the predecessor to the Cumbooquepa now part of Somerville House) in South Brisbane in 1873, just four years before his father died. He went on to become a solicitor and an Alderman in South Brisbane and established his own firm Stephens and Tozer which still exists in Brisbane today.

Stephens married Gladys Ryan in 1905 and they lived at another house designed by Dods at 622 Vulture Street, East Brisbane until Kitawah was completed in 1911. They had two children at this stage and went on to have another four who were all born at Kitawah. Family members recall a quiet, family-oriented homelife. The children played games in the garden with neighbouring children and had a number of ponies, Gladys held a monthly "at home" when visitors came to call. The house was extended sometime between 1915 and 1919. As Dods had moved to Sydney in 1913, the nature of his involvement in the design of the extension is not clear. A wing was added to the north-west corner to accommodate bedroom space for the boys, substantially altering the roof-form and appearance of the house from Heath Street. Prior to the extension, the house had verandahs on the western, southern and eastern sides and the massive crippled hipped roof presented an asymmetric front to the street. This asymmetry was maintained with the extension, adding another steep hip whose ridge was at a higher level than the hip on the western side. A gable roof was inserted into the central part of the roof and a decorative screen mounted upon the gable end became a central feature of this elevation. The front stairs were re-aligned to be centered with the new size of the verandah and as a consequence, no longer align with the front door.

Kitawah is a late example of Robin Dods' work in Brisbane, as the following year he moved to Sydney, where he did not have the same opportunity to undertake large domestic commissions. Dods was an exceptionally talented and original architect, introducing to Queensland the "formal and philosophical ideas of both the British Arts and Crafts movement and Edwardian classicism". At the same time, he refined and re-worked common elements of traditional Queensland houses and methods of construction and his houses exhibited a common-sense and often innovative approach to designing for the sub-tropical climate. Dods produced an impressive and high quality body of work in Queensland including hospital, commercial and ecclesiastical buildings as well as many residences. In the domestic realm his approach was widely imitated, in particular his planning and detailing of verandahs, external stairs, ventilated roofs and gable decorations.

Gladys Stephens continued to live at Kitawah after Llewellyn died in 1934. In 1936 a 28-perch (710 m^{2}) section of the block on the western side was sub-divided and sold and a further two roods, eight perches sub-divided into four blocks at the back of the block to the north was sold in 1938. Then in 1943 the Stephens family sold the house to the Parer family. The Parers renamed the house Wewak after one of their plantations in Papua New Guinea. The Parers further sub-divided the block in 1951, creating three 24-perch (610 m^{2}) blocks and one 27-perch (680 m^{2}) block, leaving Kitawah on a block with an area of 2 roods 9 perches (2,300 m^{2}). In 1969, the house was sold to Dr James Hemsley and the name of the house reverted to Kitawah. The property was sold in April 2012 to the Anglican Church Grammar School (commonly knowns as Churchie).

== Description ==
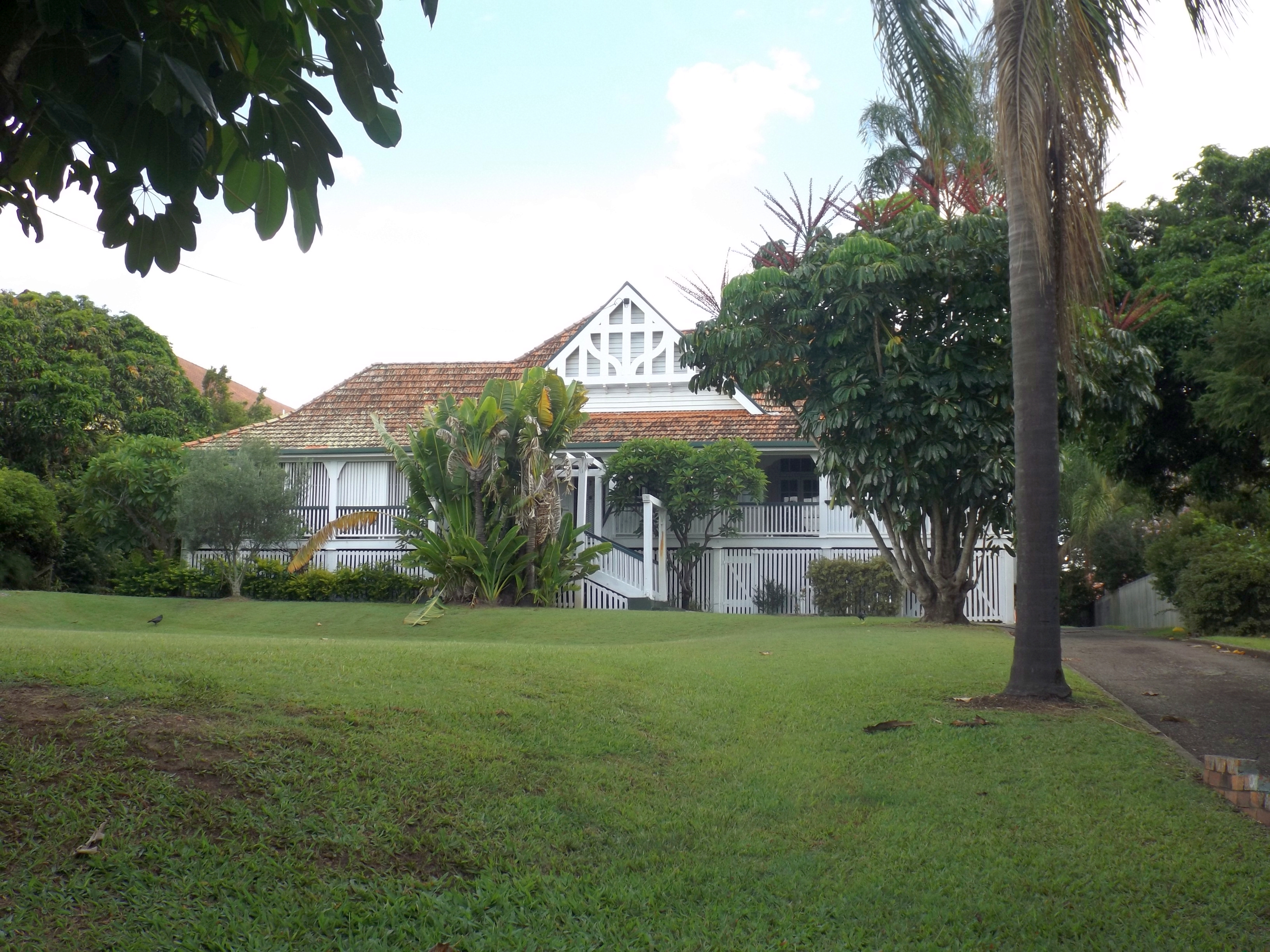
Residence and front lawn, 2015

Kitawah is a large and imposing timber house, high-set on stumps with extensive verandahs and a massive hipped roof covered with Marseilles pattern terracotta tiles. The house has two tall masonry chimneys with high level openings and a skirt of timber battens infilling the spaces between the posts. Much of the garden setting is intact, Kitawah is located at the back of the large block with driveways to both sides. The front of the block is a large levelled and grassed area that was formerly a tennis court. The entry staircase is a prominent feature of this elevation, along with a large weatherboard gable with a bold decorative screen in the plane of the bargeboards. Stairs from two sides arrive on a central landing and then a single stair leads to the front verandah, the landing is covered with a simple timber pergola and post and beam-style timber "arches" mark the bottom of the staircases.

The verandahs of the house are characterised by substantial timber posts and a simple balustrade. At the north-eastern corner of the house the verandah enlarges to become a semi-enclosed room of generous proportions, with large vertical timber louvres infilling the space between the roof and the balustrade. A set of stairs leads into the back garden from this room on the southern side. The planning and spatial arrangement of the house is complex, revolving around a number of axes with interlocking rooms of various ceiling heights. A long central hall runs through the house from a small vestibule just inside the front door. Three large bedrooms are located on the eastern side of the hall and are connected to a north-facing verandah which in turn, leads to the outdoor room on the north-eastern corner. Major public rooms are found on the western side of the hall.

The dining room and drawing room are linked by a wide opening with sliding timber doors. The dining room is the larger of the two rooms and has a large, dark brick, arched fireplace. The drawing room has an alcove located on the north side and has windows on two sides, not unlike an enlarged window seat but square in plan. All of these rooms are lined with timber vee-jay boarding and are stained up to the picture rail to simulate the richness of panelling. Bedrooms, hall and public rooms are all carpeted. The north-western corner of the house has now been enclosed with fibro-cement sheeting to form two large rooms, which are semi self-contained with basic bathroom facilities.

A secondary axis is formed on the western side of these rooms by a series of doors that link the kitchen to the dining room, drawing room and on to the front verandah. The back section of the house revolves around the large space of a well-proportioned back hall. The kitchen, bathroom, extra bedroom or study, former servant's room and back stairs all lead off this central space. The kitchen is located to the back of the dining room and has a large fireplace that is back-to-back with the fireplace of the dining room. A large walk-in pantry is located on the north-western corner of the kitchen. The kitchen, bathroom and toilet have recent fittings. The former servant's room is located up a short set of stairs adjacent to the back stairs.

A broad set of stairs with very wide timber treads leads into the wash house area on the ground floor. This area is distinctive of many of Dods' domestic designs with the hipped roof extending down to enclose a high, airy space accommodating a range of "back of house" functions in a semi-open space. This area is used as a laundry and wine cellar and contains the copper and a fireplace.

== Heritage listing ==
Kitawah was listed on the Queensland Heritage Register on 23 June 2000 having satisfied the following criteria.

The place is important in demonstrating the evolution or pattern of Queensland's history.

Kitawah, constructed in 1912, is important in demonstrating the continued growth and development of the East Brisbane area in the early part of the 20th century and illustrating the way of life of affluent families over a period of eighty years.

1. The place is important in demonstrating the principal characteristics of a particular class of cultural places.

Kitawah demonstrates the characteristics of a timber urban residence. Set in grounds and noted for its scale, finish, and design, Kitawah is an example of domestic housing in Queensland.

The place is important because of its aesthetic significance.

The building has significance as a surviving, intact example of the mature work of Queensland architect Robert S. (Robin) Dods. The handling of form, scale, materials and details are noteworthy. In particular, the interior finishes and planning are highly intact.

The place is important in demonstrating a high degree of creative or technical achievement at a particular period.

Acknowledged as one of Dods complex domestic designs, Kitawah illustrates the development of Queensland housing and has a special association with the work of RS Dods.

The place has a special association with the life or work of a particular person, group or organisation of importance in Queensland's history.

Kitawah is acknowledged as one of Dods' domestic designs and demonstrates creative achievement in the development of Queensland housing. It also has a special association with the work of RS Dods. The residence also has an association with the Stephens family, who built the house.
