= Alexander Marks =

Australian physician and military officer

Alexander Hammett Marks
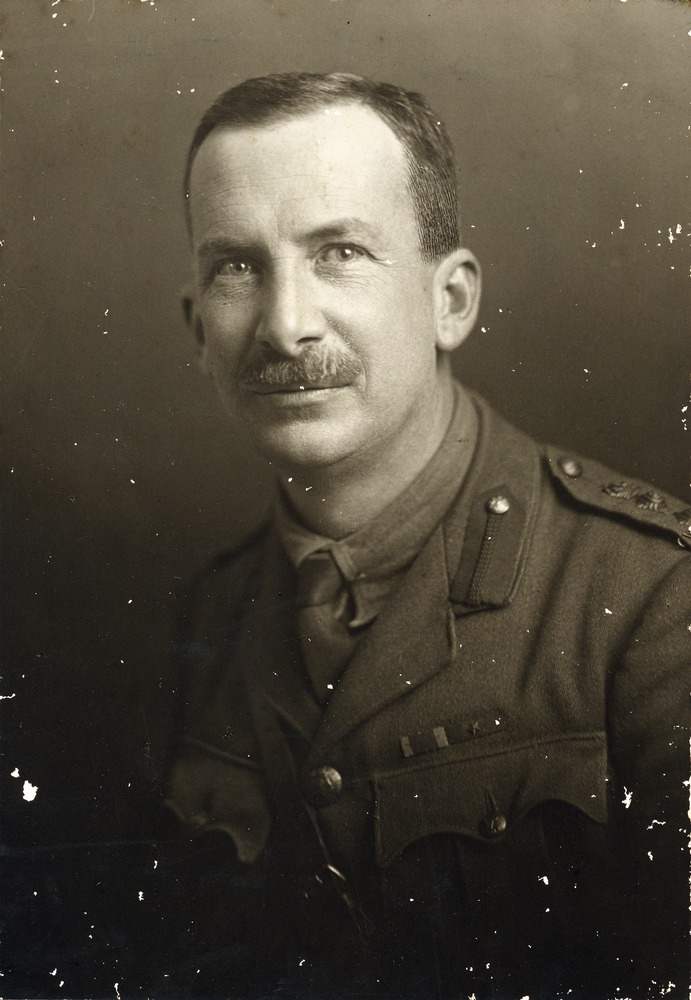
- Colonel Alexander Marks in 1918
- Born: 6 August 1880; Brisbane, Queensland
- Died: 18 January 1954 (aged 73); Auchenflower, Queensland
- Relatives: Charles Marks (father); Edward Marks (brother); Robin Dods (half-brother); Espie Dods (half -brother)
- Military career
- Allegiance: Australia
- Branch: Australian Army
- Service years: 1911–1938
- Rank: Colonel
- Commands: 1st Australian Casualty Clearing Station (1917–18); 16th Australian Field Ambulance (1917); 2nd Australian Field Ambulance (1916–17)
- Conflicts: First World War
- Awards: Commander of the Order of the British Empire; Distinguished Service Order; Mentioned in Despatches (2); Croix de guerre (France)

Alexander Hammett Marks, CBE, DSO (6 August 1880 – 18 January 1954) was an Australian physician and military officer. Serving during the First World War, Marks was mentioned twice in despatches, and awarded the Distinguished Service Order, the Croix de Guerre, and made a Commander of the Order of the British Empire for his service.

== Early life ==
Marks was born in Brisbane on 6 August 1880. He was the first son of Dr Charles Ferdinand Marks, a surgeon and later member of the Queensland Legislative Council, and his wife Elizabeth (née Stodart). He was the elder brother of Edward (born 1882), and was educated at the Brisbane Grammar School. After completing secondary education, he travelled to Dublin where he studied medicine at Trinity College, graduating with an M. D. degree in 1905.

== Medical career ==
Returning to Brisbane in 1904, Marks established a medical practice at Wickham Terrace and began to practice medicine, with a particular focus on obstetrics and gynaecology. He also served on the council of the Queensland branch of the British Medical Association, taking on the role of President of the association in 1914.

== Military service ==
Even before the outbreak of the First World War, Marks had had an association with the military, having been appointed as an honorary captain with the Australian Army Medical Corps, and attached to the 2nd Brigade as a medical officer. With the outbreak of war, Marks enlisted in the Australian Imperial Force and was posted to the 3rd Field Artillery Brigade as a regimental medical officer. He served with that unit through the Gallipoli Campaign from the initial landing through to the final evacuation. He was promoted to the rank of major in September 1915.

In 1916, Marks was transferred to the 4th Division and appointed as deputy assistant director of medical services. He served in that role until December of that year when he was promoted again, this time to lieutenant-colonel, and command of the 2nd Australian Field Ambulance. In March 1917, he was assigned to form and command the new 16th Australian Field Ambulance, which was attached to the 16th Brigade stationed in England. In October, he was sent back to France where he commanded the 1st Australian Casualty Clearing Station, serving in this capacity until September of the following year when he was promoted to the rank of colonel and assistant director of Medical Services to the 1st Division.

== Return to Australia ==
At the conclusion of the war, Marks returned to Australia and resumed his medical practice. He was the President of the Medical Defence Society of Queensland from 1931 to 1946, and held a number of positions including "honorary radiologist" and "senior gynaecologist" at the Brisbane General Hospital. He also continued his military associations, continuing part-time service with the army as a deputy director of medical services. He died in January 1954 of heart disease at his home in Auchenflower, survived by his second wife and three children from his first marriage. His son, Charles Ferdinand Marks (1909–1979) also served in the Army.

== Legacy ==
The University of Queensland’s Marks-Hirschfeld Museum of Medical History is a collection of medical instruments and medical equipment, initiated by donations by Marks and Dr John Hardie (son of Sir David Hardie). It was established in 1950. It honours at least three generations of the Marks family, who made significant contributions to the Museum collection and Dr Konrad Hirschfeld (curator for 20 years and son of Eugen Hirschfeld).
