= Charles Ferdinand Marks =

The Hon Dr Charles Marks
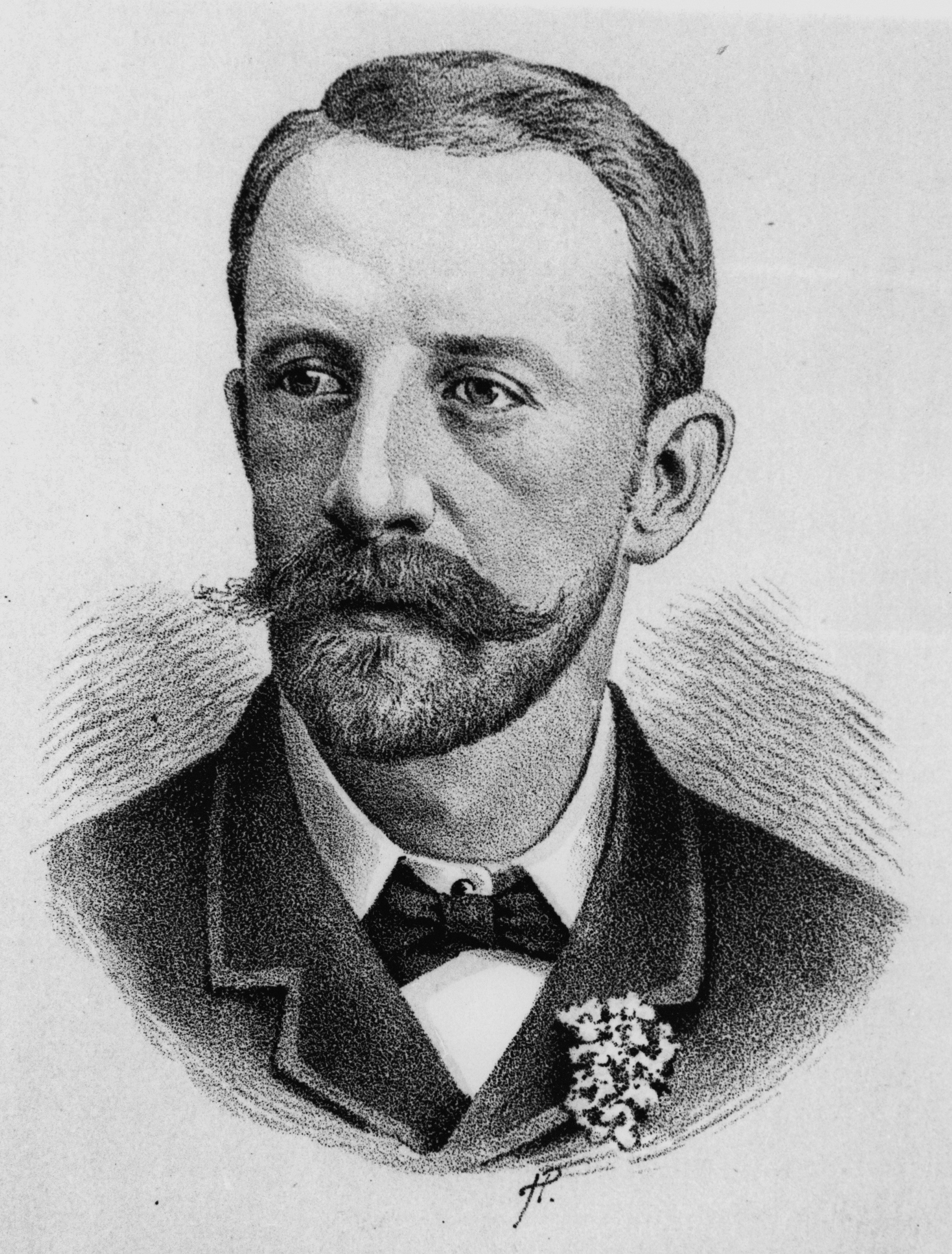
- Dr Charles Ferdinand Marks, 1887

Member of the Queensland Legislative Council
- In office 28 November 1888 – 6 January 1892
- In office 11 March 1892 – 23 March 1922

Personal details
- Born: Charles Ferdinand Marks; 8 September 1852 St. Leonard's on Sea, Sussex, England
- Died: 28 March 1941 (aged 88) Camp Mountain, Queensland, Australia
- Spouse: Elizabeth Gray Dods nee Stodart (m. 1879 d. 1908)
- Relations: Robin Dods (step-son), Espie Dods (step-son), James Stodart (brother-in-law)
- Children: Alexander Marks (son), Edward Oswald Marks (son)
- Education: Queen's College, Belfast
- Occupation: Surgeon

Charles Ferdinand Marks (1852–1941) was a physician and politician in Queensland, Australia. He was a Member of the Queensland Legislative Council.

== Politics ==
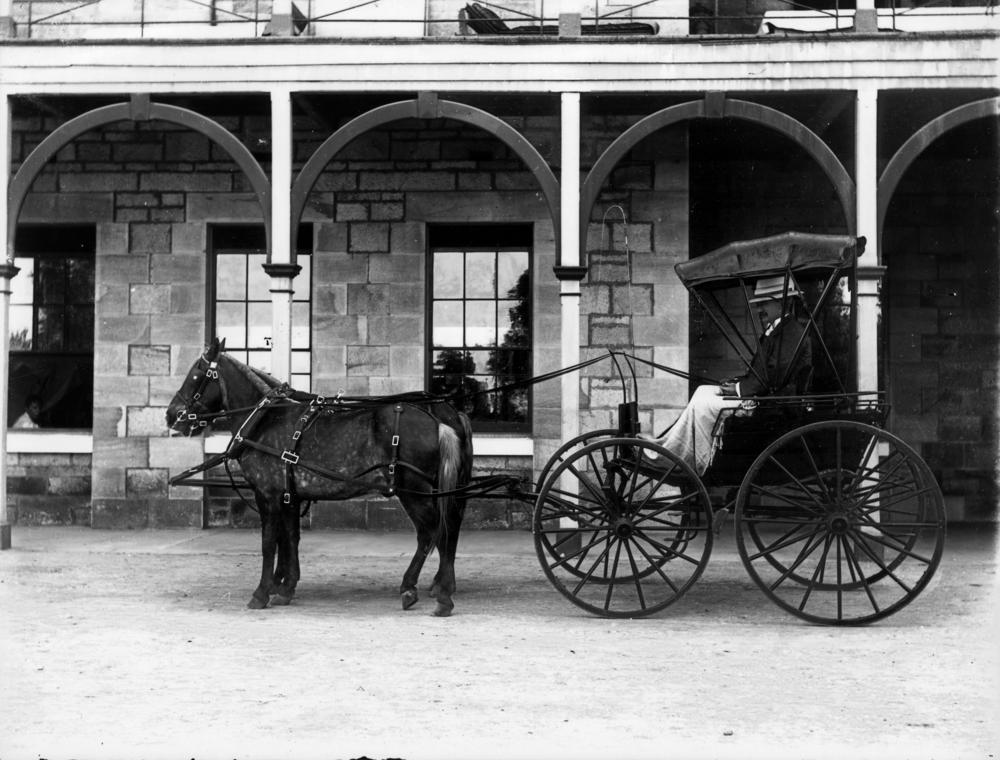
Doctor Charles Marks sitting in his horsedrawn vehicle outside Brisbane Hospital, circa 1890

Charles Marks was appointed to the Queensland Legislative Council on 8 November 1888. Although a lifetime appointment, he resigned on 6 January 1892, as he was facing bankruptcy proceedings in relation to the RubyAnna sugar company of which he was a partner. However, he was able to satisfy his creditors and was reappointed to the Council approximately two months later on 11 March 1892. He then remained on the council until it was abolished on 23 March 1922.

== Family life ==
In 1879, Charles Marks married widow Elizabeth Gray Dods (née Stodart), making him the step-father of architect Robin Dods and Government Medical Officer Espie Dods and brother-in-law of James Stodart, a Member of the Queensland Legislative Assembly. His sons Alexander Marks and Ted Marks both served with distinction in the First World War.

== Legacy ==
The Charles Marks and Elizabeth Gray Marks Prize is awarded each year to a medical student from the University of Queensland.
