= Edward Marks =

Australian ophthalmologist and geologist (1882 – 1971)

Edward Oswald Marks
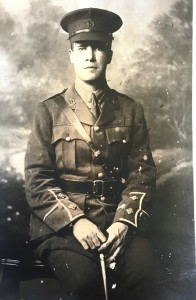
- Lt Edward (Ted) Oswald Marks during World War I. Photo used with the permission of John Oxley Library, State Library of Queensland, Marks Family Collection, Acc: 27331, item 3000.
- Born: 28 October 1882; Brisbane, Queensland, Australia
- Died: 22 September 1971 (aged 88)
- Education: The Southport School, Brisbane Grammar School, Trinity College, Dublin
- Spouse: Nesta Drury
- Children: Elizabeth Nesta (Pat) Marks
- Father: Charles Ferdinand Marks
- Relatives: Robin Dods; Espie Dods; Alexander Marks; (brothers)
- Scientific career
- Fields: Geologist, ophthalmologist

Edward Oswald Marks (28 October 1882 – 22 September 1971), was an Australian ophthalmologist. He studied first as a geologist, and then began a second career as an ophthalmologist. His work on preventing trachoma in children was significant in reducing eye disease in remote communities.

== Early life ==
Marks was born at Wickham Terrace, Brisbane, Queensland, the son of Charles and Elizabeth Marks. His mother had three sons from her first marriage to Robert Dods, including Robin Dods and Espie Dods. Charles Marks was a doctor and would later become a member of the Queensland Legislative Council. Charles and Elizabeth had four children, including Alexander Marks. Ted Marks attended The Southport School in 1895, aged 13 and Brisbane Grammar School from 1896 to 1900. His family sent him to Ireland to study engineering at Trinity College, Dublin, alongside his brother Alexander Marks (1880–1954), who was studying medicine. Marks graduated with a BA in January 1905 and a BAI (engineering) in December 1905. He took every possible prize for a student of Engineering including geology, mining, metallurgy and palaeontology distinctions. After practical experience on the Isle of Man, Wales and England, he spent a further year at the Royal School of Mines in London studying metallurgy. Although offered a job with the Geological Survey of India, he elected to return to Australia.

== Early career ==
Upon his return to Brisbane, Marks worked at Mount Morgan Mines as a metallurgist, and then joined the Geological Survey of Queensland in 1908 as Assistant Government Geologist, preparing one of the first geological maps of Queensland. His first job was to survey the coal resources of the Southeast Moreton District. The map he produced in 1910, "Geological map of south east Moreton coal measures" was one of the most consulted maps in Queensland history. His report a "Deep-sinking Proposal on the Charters Towers Mineral Field", which included a scale model, was displayed at the Brisbane Exhibition, in August 1913. After becoming engaged to childhood friend, Nesta Drury in 1913, Marks returned to study in Ireland, pursuing a medical degree. After their marriage in London in July 1914, they moved to Dublin. He was a Resident at St Patrick Dun's Hospital during the Easter Rising in Dublin of 1916.

After completing medical studies in 1916, Marks joined the Royal Army Medical Corps, during World War I as he could not join the Australian Infantry Force (AIF) without returning to Australia. However he contracted rheumatic fever in the trenches of France and was invalided out of the army, with the rank of captain. He and Nesta's only child, Elizabeth Nesta (Pat) Marks was born in 1918 in Dublin, Ireland. Marks graduated with his MD in 1919, but concerns about the lingering effect of rheumatic fever on his stamina, induced him to pursue ophthalmology. He was a Resident at the Royal Victoria Eye and Ear Hospital in Dublin, and then a locum at the Shrewsbury Eye and Ear Hospital, before returning to Australia in 1920.

== Later career ==
Marks would demonstrate a particular interest in children's health in his work as an eye specialist. He would become a member of the Ophthalmological Society of Australia and an Honorary Member of the Brisbane Children's Hospital from 1921 to 1938. He was a senior ophthalmologist from 1938 to 1946. From 1932 he was also part-time Ophthalmologist to the Queensland School Health Services. Marks was in charge of the Wilson Ophthalmic Hostel for Trachomatous Children at Windsor and made four surveys of the eye disease, trachoma in western Queensland.

He was for many years Councillor and Deputy Chairman of the Queensland Bush Children's Health Scheme, and a Councillor of the Royal Flying Doctor Service in Queensland. To quote Dorothy Hill (Queensland Naturalist 20 4/6, 1972), "His work for trachomatous children practically eliminated this disease from western Queensland". By 1953, the Wilson Hostel closed for lack of patients, due to his team's work in identifying and treating the disease. He retired from practice in 1957.

== Professional memberships ==
In 1922, Marks became a Foundation Member of the Great Barrier Reef Committee. The Committee organised the Michaelmas Cay and Heron Island bores of the Great Barrier Reef in 1927 and 1937. They also worked at establishing the 1928-1929 Great Barrier Reef (Yonge) Expedition to Low Isles Reef. Marks served as Chairman of the Great Barrier Reef Committee from 1947 to 1954, following the death of Henry Caselli Richards, who had established the Committee with Sir Matthew Nathan. He played an important part in the establishment of the Heron Island Research Station, along with Dr Dorothy Hill.

Marks continued to serve in the military after his return to Australia, as a Captain and Army Ophthalmologist in the AAMC from 1923 until 1939. He also served as Wing Commander and a Consultant in the RAAF for six years.

The Marks family held a strong view on the importance of science in the community, and belonged to many societies. At different times Marks was a member and office holder in the Royal Society of Queensland. He was elected an Honorary Life Member in 1954. He was also a member of the Geological Society of Australia, the Royal Historical Society of Queensland, the Anthropological Society of Queensland, the National Parks Association of Queensland, and the National Trust of Queensland.

== Legacy ==
Marks died in 1971. He was survived by his daughter, Pat Marks, who was an entomologist with the Queensland Institute of Medical Research. The Marks family were strongly motivated to preserve history and during their lifetime they donated furniture and artefacts to the Queensland Museum, and in time donated both professional and personal objects to a number of museums around Brisbane. These included personal correspondence, scientific specimens, furnitures and the family's property at Samford, which was donated to QUT. Items from E.O. Marks can be found at the Queensland Museum, Queensland State Library, and a number of smaller military and medical museums.
