= Theosophical Society Building, Brisbane =

Theosophical Society Building
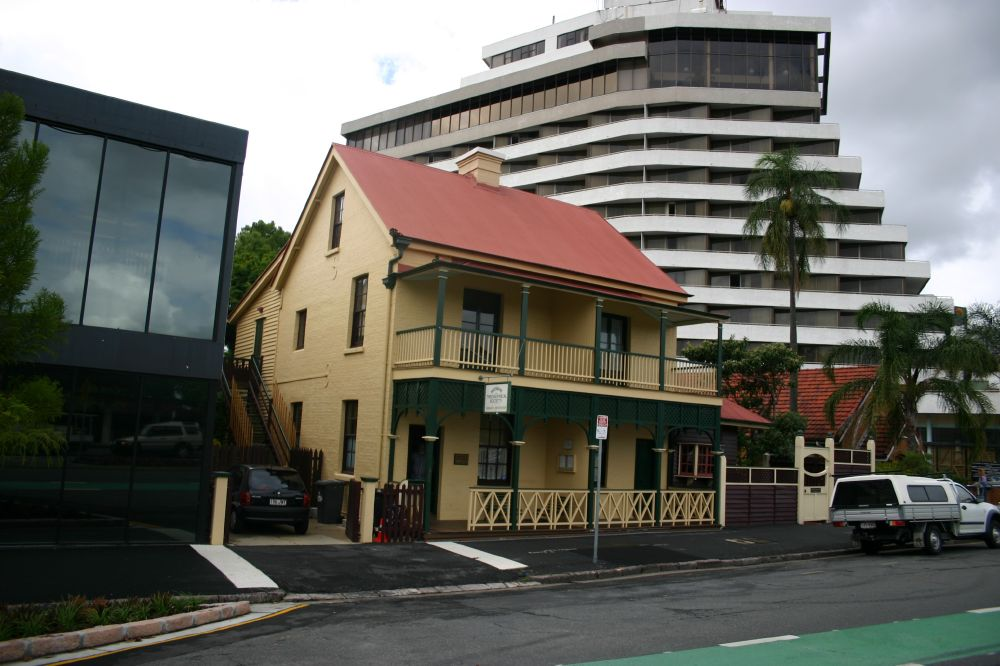
- Theosophical Society Building, 2009

- Location within Queensland Location within Australia
- 27.4639°S 153.021°E
- Location: 355 Wickham Terrace, Spring Hill, City of Brisbane, Queensland, Australia

History
- Design period: 1840s–1860s (mid-19th century)
- Built: 1863–1864

Queensland Heritage Register
- Official name: Theosophical Society Building, Callender House
- Type: state heritage (built)
- Designated: 21 October 1992
- Reference no.: 600169
- Significant components: basement / sub-floor, attic, residential accommodation – maisonette/s / duplex, fence/wall – perimeter

Theosophical Society Building is a heritage-listed duplex at 355 Wickham Terrace, Spring Hill, City of Brisbane, Queensland, Australia. It was built from 1863 to 1864. It is also known as Callender House. It was added to the Queensland Heritage Register on 21 October 1992.

== History ==
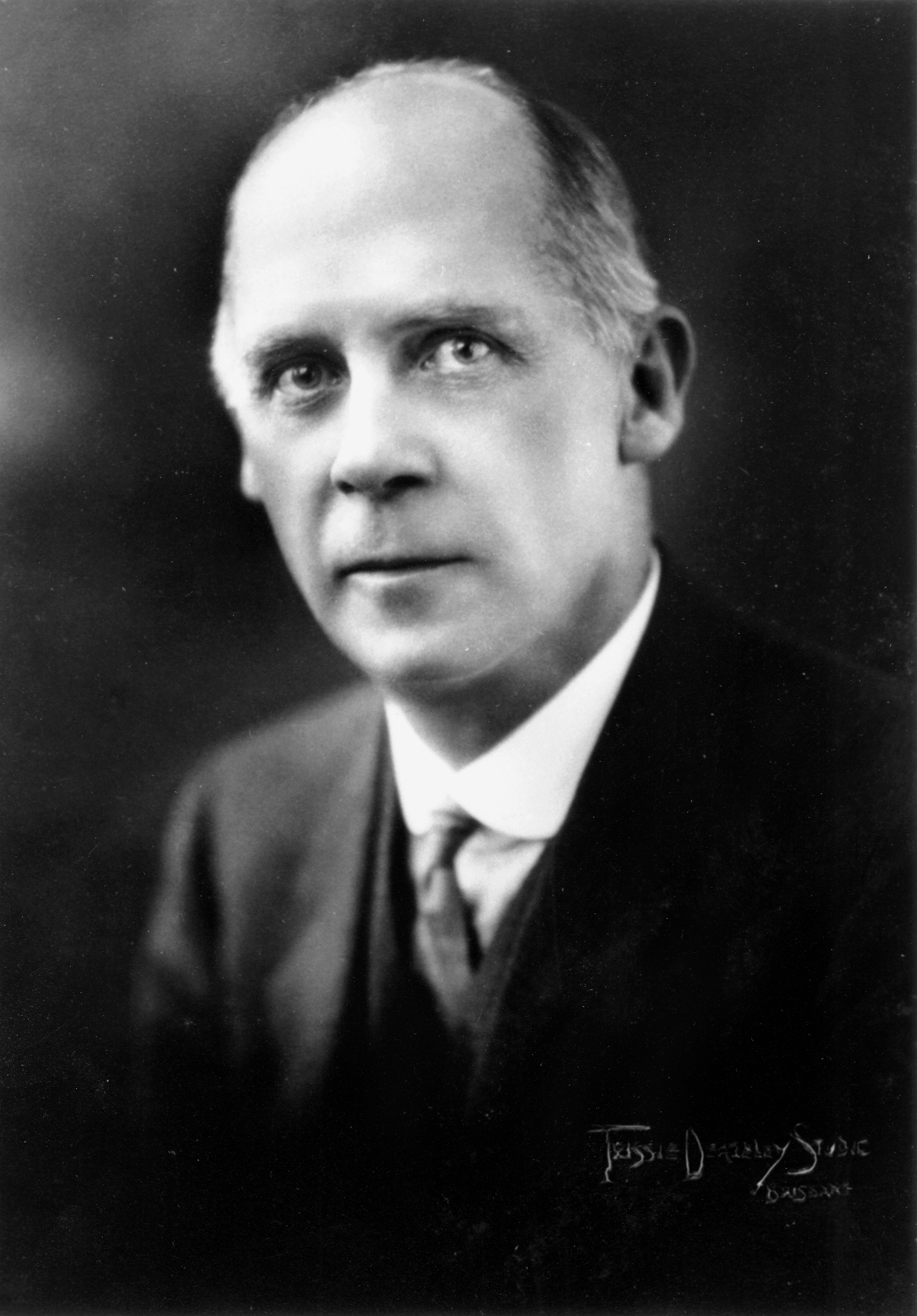
Dr J Espie Dods

This pair of semi-detached houses was built in late 1863 to early 1864. The building was probably erected by the first landowner Patrick Mayne (1856), or possibly for the second owner John McNab. The houses were advertised for rent on 30 January 1864, two days after registration in McNab's name, when they were described as "newly erected ... containing five rooms and kitchen".

Subsequent owners included Joseph Buckle (1885–1910), a Primitive Methodist minister, who resided there for a period. From at least 1883 the building was known as Callender House.

The property was purchased in 1910 by Dr Espie Dods, who moved there from 97 Wickham Terrace. His architect brother Robin Dods renovated and extended the property for its use as a private house and consulting rooms. This reflected the medico-residential character of Wickham Terrace at the time.

In 1925 the property, which included adjacent land now occupied by the Liberal Catholic Church, was purchased by the Brisbane Theosophical Society. Minor alterations were carried out in 1925 by architects Hall & Prentice. Major conservation work was undertaken in 1986–1987.

== Description ==
The building comprises a pair of 1860s two-storeyed semi-detached brick houses with a 1912 timber extension to the side and rear.

The original houses are small in scale without halls or corridors, and include attic and basement. Construction is of brick, with brick-on-edge construction on walls protected by verandahs. The main roof is gabled and clad in corrugated galvanised iron, concealing earlier shingles. The main facade has a two-storeyed timber verandah, reconstructed in 1986–1987 to a 1910 photograph.

The timber extension designed by Dods added new large rooms on two levels at the rear, and a single-storeyed kitchen wing. A new porch and hall gave entrance to both consulting rooms and house. The extension is clad with weatherboards, lined with timber and roofed with corrugated galvanised iron. There is no visible evidence of earlier kitchen wings. The fence in front of the extension is by Dods. Dods' enclosure of the front verandahs does not survive.

In its present form the building clearly reveals the two major stages in its development.

== Heritage listing ==
Theosophical Society Building was listed on the Queensland Heritage Register on 21 October 1992 having satisfied the following criteria.

The place is important in demonstrating the evolution or pattern of Queensland's history.

The building is evidence of the former residential and medico-residential character of Wickham Terrace.

The place demonstrates rare, uncommon or endangered aspects of Queensland's cultural heritage.

The former Callender House is one of the few remaining 1860s buildings in Brisbane and is a rare example of semi-detached housing which was relatively common in the 1860s.

The place is important in demonstrating the principal characteristics of a particular class of cultural places.

As an important example of the work of the architect Robin Dods, which demonstrates his skill in adapting an older building, the former Callender House is significant.

The place has a special association with the life or work of a particular person, group or organisation of importance in Queensland's history.

As an important example of the work of the architect RS Dods, which demonstrates his skill in adapting an older building, the former Callender House is significant.
