= Joseph Espie Dods =

Australian medical practitioner and soldier

Lieutenant Colonel Joseph Espie Dods DSO MC VD
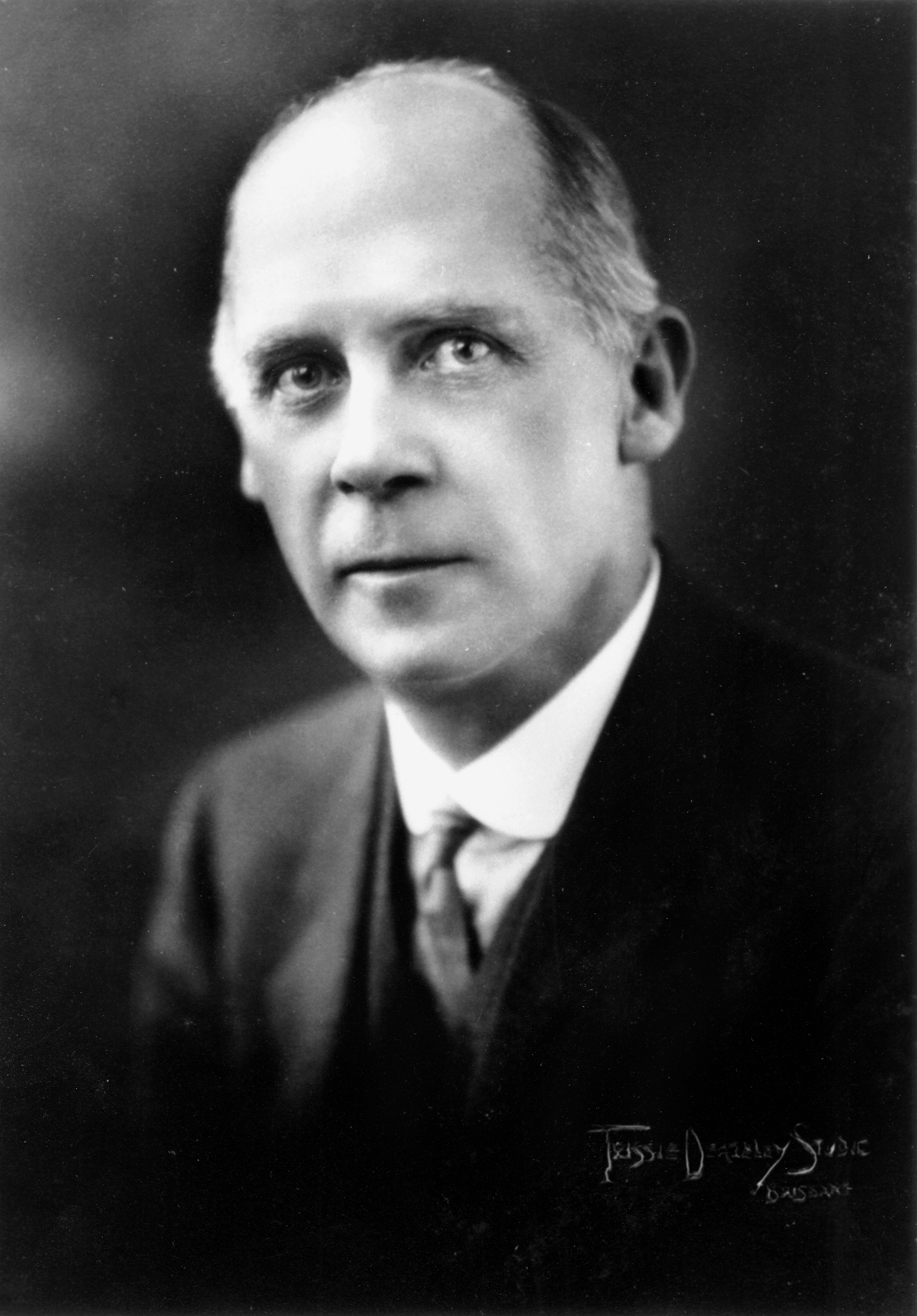

Government Medical Officer and Health Officer for the City of Brisbane
- In office May 1902 – 6 December 1930

Personal details
- Born: 29 June 1874 Shepherd's Bush, London, England
- Died: 6 December 1930 (aged 56) Brisbane, Queensland, Australia
- Education: University of Edinburgh; Trinity College Dublin

Military service
- Allegiance: Colony of Queensland; Australia
- Branch/service: Queensland Defence Force; Citizen Military Forces; Australian Imperial Force
- Years of service: 1898–1903; 1908–1927
- Rank: Lieutenant Colonel
- Battles/wars: Second Boer War; First World War
- Awards: Distinguished Service Order; Military Cross; Mentioned in Despatches; Colonial Auxiliary Forces Officers' Decoration

Joseph Espie Dods, DSO, MC, VD (29 June 1874 – 6 December 1930) was an Australian medical practitioner and soldier. He served in the South African War and the First World War, and was Government Medical Officer for the City of Brisbane for 30 years.

== Early life ==
Espie Dods was born in Shepherd's Bush, London, third son of Robert Smith Dods and his wife Elizabeth Gray Stodart. Both his parents were born in Edinburgh, but Elizabeth had grown up in Melbourne from the age of three. Robert Dods amassed a sizeable fortune as a merchant in Dunedin, New Zealand, during the gold rush in the 1860s, and retired to Edinburgh, the city of his birth. Dods died prematurely in 1876, and his widow returned to Australia with her three sons. In 1879 she married Dr Charles Ferdinand Marks, and bore him three sons and a daughter. Two of these sons, Alexander Marks and Edward Marks would also pursue medical careers. Espie entered Brisbane Grammar School in 1885, and in 1890 was sent to school at Morat (Murten) in Switzerland to learn French and German. In 1892 he matriculated at Edinburgh University, and commenced the study of medicine. He graduated in 1897, and went to Dublin to obtain an additional qualification in Public Health. Espie was commissioned as a lieutenant in the Queensland Defence Force in 1898, and returned to Australia the following year. He was promoted captain in 1899.

== South African War ==
As the political situation in South Africa steadily deteriorated in 1899, the Queensland Government offered to send troops to support British interests. When Mafeking, Kimberley and Ladysmith were invested in October, a contingent of mounted infantry was raised, and Espie was appointed Regimental Medical Officer. The 1st Contingent sailed from Brisbane at the beginning of November 1899. At Sunnyside Espie was specially commended for staying out in the veldt overnight with a wounded officer. He also served at the Relief of Kimberley, Paardeberg, Driefontein, Johannesburg, and Pretoria, and he accompanied Baden-Powell's column to the relief of the force at Eland's River. Espie arrived back in Brisbane in December 1900.

== Career ==
In April 1902 there was an outbreak of the plague in Brisbane, and among those who perished was the Government Medical Officer for the City of Brisbane, Dr Charles Wray. Espie was appointed to the vacant position, and held this office until his death in 1930. The duties included forensic autopsies, and attendance at judicial executions at Boggo Road Gaol. In February 1906 Espie married Anna Ruth Walker, daughter of William John Walker and his wife Margaret Adelaide Reid. John Walker was a senior executive in the Australian Mutual Provident Company. The best man was Edwin Flack, Australia's first Olympic gold medallist. Elizabeth Marks had a house built for the newly-weds on Wickham Terrace in Brisbane. It was designed by Espie's brother Robin Dods, the famous architect, and survives to the present day, and is heritage-listed as Espie Dods House.

There were four children of the marriage, a daughter Margaret Ruth Espie, and three sons, William Stodart Espie, Robin Espie, and James Espie. In 1912 the expanding Dods family moved to Callander House at the western end of Wickham Terrace, a building which also still survives. Espie was by now well established in the Brisbane medical community, and in 1913 he was elected President of the Queensland Branch of the British Medical Association.

== First World War ==
On 3 September 1914 the Australian Government announced the raising of a second Light Horse Regiment in Queensland, to be designated the 5th Light Horse Regiment (2nd Light Horse Brigade). Espie was invited to be the Regimental Medical Officer, and the unit sailed for the Middle East on 21 December. The Brigade was sent to Gallipoli in May as reinforcements, but left their horses in Egypt. At Anzac Espie was able to meet up with his half-brother Alexander Marks, who was serving with the 3rd Field Artillery Brigade. In June, Espie was recommended for the Military Cross. The award was announced in January 1916. On 29 August 1915 Espie was wounded in the shoulder by shrapnel while attending a wounded man from the 11th Light Horse Regiment. The episode was witnessed by Trooper Ion Idriess. Espie was evacuated to Alexandria in Egypt, and admitted to the British 21st General Hospital at Ras-el-Tin. In September he was transferred to No 1 Red Cross Convalescent Home in Alexandria, and at the end of October was well enough to return to Anzac and rejoin his unit. The Regiment was finally withdrawn from the Peninsula in the general exodus on 20 December. Back in Egypt Espie was promoted Major with effect from 1 January 1916, and posted as Deputy Assistant Director of Medical Services at the headquarters of the 1st Division, which was currently located at Tel-el Kebir. In March the Division sailed to Marseilles, and from there was transported by train to Flanders. It went into the line to the south-west of Armentières in June 1916. At this time this sector of the Western Front was comparatively quiet. However, in early July, when the Battle of the Somme was going badly for the Allies, the 1st Division was moved south. On 23 July it was tasked with taking the village of Pozières. Espie was responsible for the co-ordination of casualty evacuation for the Division. In the course of the next three weeks 6193 officers and men were wounded, and of these 456 subsequently died. Espie showed himself to be an excellent organiser, and was recommended for the Distinguished Service Order. In September the Division was relieved and moved to Ypres, and in November Espie was informed that he was to be sent home. He had been away 2 years and five months. He was promoted lieutenant colonel in January 1917, and sailed from Plymouth in February.

== Brisbane ==
Espie arrived home in April 1917, and resumed his former position in Brisbane. He was made an official of the Queensland Branch of the Returned Soldiers and Sailors Imperial League of Australia, and in January 1918 he was for the second time elected President of the Queensland Branch of the British Medical Association. His presidential address was published in the Medical Journal of Australia. However, in 1921 the plague returned to Brisbane, which placed a considerable burden on the Government Medical Officer. The following year he was elected president of the Queensland Club, a position which he was to hold for the next four years. Although Espie had been discharged from the AIF in 1917, he had not retired from the Australian Military Forces, and remained on the Unattached List until his death in 1930. In 1923 he was awarded the Colonial Forces Long Service Medal. In 1926 Espie sold Callander House and moved into his late mother's house at 101 Wickham Terrace, which had been divided into two flats. In 1929 he took Long Service Leave and travelled to Europe with Ruth and his daughter Margaret. Ruth and Margaret were presented at Court in June.

== Death ==
After lunch on 6 December 1930, the Dods family was preparing to drive to Mt Tamborine for the weekend. They discovered that Espie, on the pretext of fetching the car, had hanged himself in the garage. No credible explanation has ever been advanced for this totally unforeseen tragedy. The circumstances of his death were not made public, and he was buried in the South Brisbane Cemetery. Espie's obituaries in the local Press were unanimous in their appreciation of his work and character, and the Medical Journal of Australia applauded his professional standing and personal qualities.
