= Feniton, New Farm =

Feniton
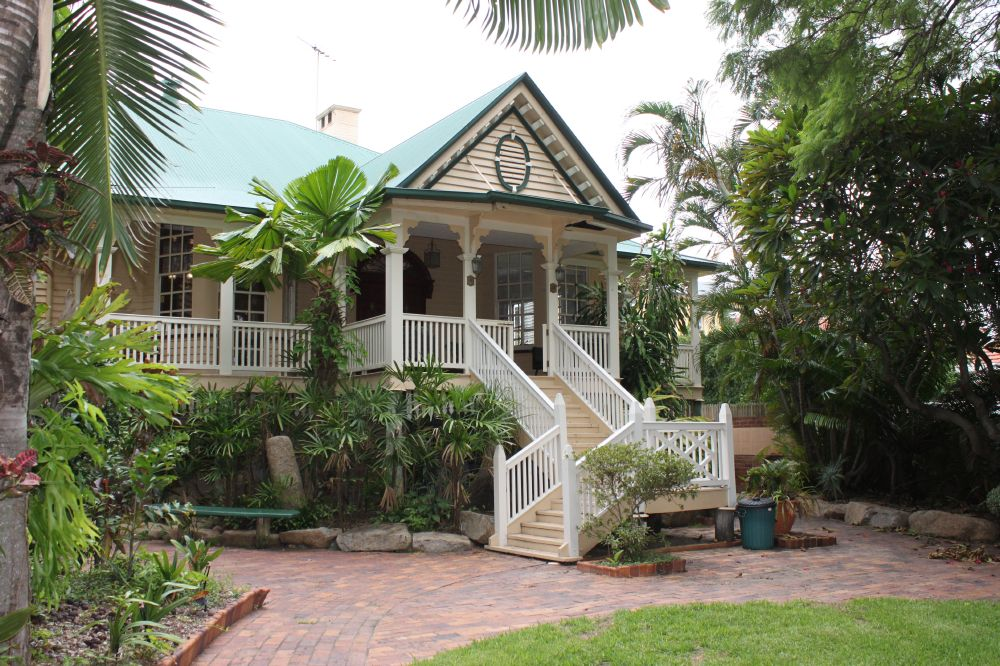
- Front Entrance, looking northeast

- Location within Queensland
- 27.4659°S 153.0430°E
- Location: 388 Bowen Terrace, New Farm, City of Brisbane, Queensland, Australia

History
- Design period: 1900–1914 (Early 20th century)
- Built: 1906–1907

Site notes
- Architect: Robin Dods
- Architectural style: Arts & Crafts

Queensland Heritage Register
- Official name: Feniton; Fenton; Almaden
- Type: state heritage
- Designated: 27 July 2018
- Reference no.: 650078
- Type: Residential: Villa
- Theme: Building settlements, towns, cities and dwellings: Dwellings

Feniton is a heritage-listed villa at 388 Bowen Terrace, New Farm, City of Brisbane, Queensland, Australia. It was designed by Robin Dods and built from 1906 to 1907. It is also known as Almaden. It was added to the Queensland Heritage Register on 27 July 2018.

== History ==
The highset timber residence located at 388 Bowen Terrace, New Farm, originally called Feniton and later Almaden, was built on just over half an acre (approximately 2036m2) of land in 1906–07 for the Trude family. Designed by the renowned architect Robert Smith (Robin) Dods, the residence was subsequently occupied from 1916 to 1927 by Edward Granville Theodore, Premier of Queensland from 1919 to 1925. The property was reduced by one third in 1938, and in 2018 Feniton remains a private residence. Feniton is a surviving example of Dods' first quality timber houses from the middle period of Hall & Dods' practice 1901–09. With its generous setback and views to and from Bowen Terrace, the house is important for its Federation aesthetic, successfully combining Arts and Crafts and Classical elements, and also has a special association with EG Theodore, a person of importance in Queensland's history.

The New Farm area was traditionally the land of the Jagera and Turrbal peoples. After the Moreton Bay penal settlement was established on the Brisbane River in 1825, in the late 1820s food was grown on the river flats between today's Merthyr Road and the southeast end of the New Farm peninsula.

Following free settlement of Brisbane in 1842, the New Farm peninsula was surveyed and sold in the 1840s for cultivation and livestock, as well as residences for Queensland's pastoralists, merchants and politicians. In the late 1850s, subdivision of allotments overlooking the Shafston Reach of the Brisbane River, at the northwest end of Bowen Terrace, resulted in the construction of villas for Brisbane's business leaders during the 1860s, and more of Brisbane's wealthy inhabitants moved to New Farm in the 1870s. The subdivision of New Farm intensified during the 1880s, and transport improvements also encouraged closer residential settlement. Horse-drawn trams ran along Brunswick Street to just past Langshaw Street by 1895, and the electrification of this line occurred in 1897. By 1914 the electric tram line ran down Brunswick Street, turned right onto Barker Street, then left onto Moray Street, and headed southeast until turning left onto Merthyr Rd and running northeast.

Despite subdivision into smaller allotments, the area of New Farm between Brunswick Street and the Shafston Reach maintained grand homes on properties covering multiple subdivisions. Described in 1906 as the province of "the attractive homes and trim gardens of many of Brisbane's most distinguished citizens, who enjoy all the advantages of country air and surroundings within a twopenny tram ride of the city proper", Bowen Terrace and Moray Street included affluent residents drawn from the judiciary, politics, civil service, the church and business. To the north-east of Brunswick Street, working classes occupied homes within walking distance of their places of employment: the factories and shops of Fortitude Valley, the Colonial Sugar Refinery at New Farm, the Bulimba Brewery, and the large wool stores and wharves being established at Teneriffe. Feniton was one such residence.

The site of Feniton was once part of Eastern Suburban Allotment 15, a block of 4.6 hectares (11 acres) extending from Brunswick Street southwest to the Brisbane River, which was subdivided in 1874 as part of the Langshaw Estate - advertised as occupying "the very finest position about the city or suburbs for gentlemen's Villa Residences". After passing through the hands of various owners from 1875, three subdivisions of the estate, totalling 3 roods and 34 perches (3895m2), were by October 1881 consolidated under the ownership of Henry James Oxley, a well-known Brisbane accountant.

By July 1880 Oxley had built his home Mossleigh at the north corner of Bowen Terrace and Langshaw Street, with the remainder of his property, to the northwest, used as his garden. After Oxley's mortgagee obtained the property in 1905, just over half an acre - 2 roods and half a perch (2036m2) - of Mossleigh's garden was sold to John Elworthy Trude in 1906.

Trude (1869–1952) was born in Poughill, Devon, England, and by April 1891 he was working in Brisbane as the local manager for Australian tea merchants Atcherley and Dawson. In July 1906 he married Phyllis Emlyn Gore, a member of the pioneering pastoralist family of Yandilla Station on the Darling Downs. From 1 October 1896 Trude was admitted as a partner in Atcherley and Dawson and when it was incorporated in New South Wales in November 1897 (with offices in Sydney, Melbourne and Brisbane), Trude was one of the new company's seven directors.

The Trude's new house at 388 Bowen Terrace was named Feniton, after Phyllis' family home at Yandilla (in 1901, her father was living at Feniton, three miles upriver from Yandilla House) and an earlier Gore residence at Parramatta. There is also a village in Devon called Feniton, about 26 km southeast of John Trude's birthplace in Poughill. Tenders for the house were called in July 1906, the tender of £980 from Louis Hammer, a building contractor of Deagon, was accepted, and the house was under construction by the end of August 1906.

Feniton was designed by architect Robert Smith (Robin) Dods (1868–1920), principal of the Brisbane firm of Hall & Dods. Born in Dunedin, New Zealand, Dods lived briefly in Britain before coming to Brisbane in the late 1870s. He later trained as an architect in Scotland and England under a number of esteemed architects who were working in the Arts and Crafts idiom. He returned to Brisbane in 1896 and started in practice with architect Francis Richard Hall (of John Hall & Son) as Hall & Dods. In 1904, Dods was also appointed Diocesan Architect for the Church of England's Brisbane Diocese.

The practice of Hall & Dods produced a wide range of accomplished buildings and was credited with achieving an "architectural revolution" in Brisbane. Dods was responsible for most of the design within the firm, integrating contemporary British design philosophies with the traditions of Queensland housing and the requirements of a subtropical climate. In 1913, Dods moved to Sydney to join the firm Spain and Cosh, which became Spain Cosh & Dods, maintaining his Brisbane association with FR Hall for several years. He died in Sydney in 1920. Dods was one of the few Australian architects to have his work published in the United Kingdom, and has been acknowledged as "one of the most significant early 20th century Australian architects" and as a rare practitioner of the Arts and Crafts style in Queensland.

Arts and Crafts was an international design movement flourishing between 1860 and 1910, its influence continuing into the 1930s. The style championed traditional craftsmanship using simple forms and often applied medieval, romantic or folk styles of decoration. Arts and Crafts architecture is characterised by solidity and heaviness through well-proportioned solid forms, wide porches and prominent steep roofs. The texture of ordinary materials is expressed in the detailing and building composition is asymmetrical.

The most noticeable characteristic of Dods' Queensland houses was a general feeling of solidity and substance. This was established through a generous roof continuous over the verandah; enclosed or screened understorey to give the house a visually solid base; oversized individual elements; and dark coloured materials to give the house a weighty gravity. Chimney elements were generally tall and flat, topped with a plain rectangular shaft. Dods pioneered in Queensland the use of linseed oil as a wood preserver and exterior finish and coloured it with various pigments. Red and deep brown were the most common colours and this finish on the exterior walls was offset with white or cream enamel paint on the trim.

The composition of facades and circulation routes is a more nuanced element of Dods' houses. Facades often only implied symmetry. Entries were often off-centre or perpendicular, emphasised by wide and expressive entry stairs. Projecting bay windows and corner fireplaces were recurrent elements, and these features are present in Feniton.

The health and comfort of the occupants were major considerations in Dods' designs. Living spaces were well-oriented and internal layouts permitted cross ventilation. Other ventilation devices included wide window and door openings, ventilated gables and ridges, and ventilation fleches. Door fanlights were often solid hinged panels, where not on an external wall. The houses were often provided with generous, considered service spaces including back halls and wash houses. Dods' houses are also notable for their informal spaces, including verandah "piazzas", a generous verandah area suitable for informal occupation and usually given a northeast aspect. Dods' piazzas were a principal external space, designed for the Queensland climate.

Interiors included fine decorative timber joinery and panelling. Fireplace surrounds and built-in cupboards were also a feature. Offices and halls, dining and drawing rooms often had pine boards up to the picture rail stained in a colour to simulate mahogany. This finish was used also on doors and windows as well as skirtings and architraves.

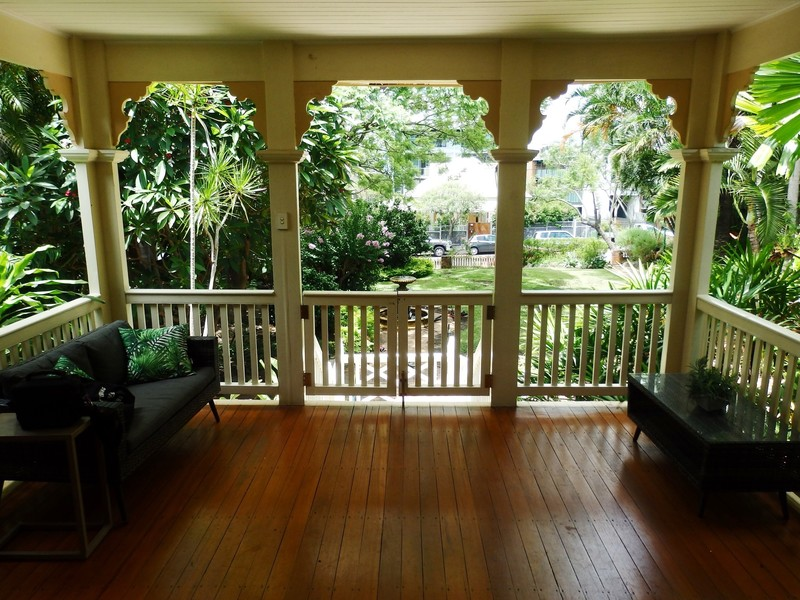
Entrance verandah (piazza), looking towards Bowen Terrace, 2017

For the Trudes, Dods designed a highset timber house with verandahs on three sides. It was sheltered by a large, steeply pitched hip roof with a projecting gable over a front (southwest) entrance and over a piazza on the rear, eastern corner. The roof featured two tall, projecting, face brick chimneys and a ventilated ridge. The walls were clad in timber weatherboards, which were mitred at corners and extended down to the ground-plane, concealing the understorey. Exterior timber detailing was restrained and reinforced the solidity of the house, with oversized timber posts and curved brackets to verandahs.

The formal entry to the Trudes' house was via a bifurcated front stair leading to the front verandah and an impressive entry hall. Feniton included: generous living and entertaining areas, including the piazza, which was connected to the garden via a stair; two bedrooms (plus dressing room) at the rear; kitchen; utility rooms; and servant's quarters. A back hall off the kitchen had internal stairs to the laundry in the understorey.

Dods designed gardens as a setting for his houses. They featured formal parterre gardens, terraces and walls, flower beds, tennis courts, hedges, topiaries, flowering ornamental trees, and geometric path and lawn layouts. In locating a house on its block, Dods considered the size of the site and of the house, the fall of the land, the orientation and outlook, the setback from the street, the location of any drive, the garden, fences and gates.

At 388 Bowen Terrace, Dods' sited the residence so it had a large garden to both the front (southwest) and side (southeast). Feniton faces Bowen Terrace but is set well back (25m) on the site's shallow slope; this approach was also used for the Dods-designed Lyndhurst in Clayfield (1896), which has since lost most of its large front garden; and Kitawah at East Brisbane (1911). However, not all Dods houses had large front gardens, given that he designed each house to suit its site. Wairuna (1896) was set back from the road by 3m with a large garden and tennis court to the side (north), while a smaller house built as a rental property for his mother in New Farm (1900) is set back about 7m. Turrawan was set close to London Road, with a tennis court to the side (east).

Feniton forms part of a group of major works or "first quality houses" of the middle period of the Hall & Dods practice (1901–09), a group described as comprising "most of the interesting houses designed by Dods". Out of all of Dods' suburban residential works (193 designed), at least 53 are known to survive in 2018.

The Trudes were living at Feniton by April 1907, and a dance was held there on the evening of 17 July, celebrating the first anniversary of their marriage. The Trudes received their guests in the hall and attendees then "passed through to the drawing room and large verandahs, where dancing took place". The verandahs were enclosed with flags, and roses were placed on supper tables in the dining room. In August 1910 a garden party was held with more than 100 guests. Guests were received by Mrs Trude in the drawing room, and afternoon tea was held on the lawn.

It is not known if Dods designed a landscaping scheme for the garden of Feniton, but family photographs show that by 1908 the garden layout had been established, with lawns, garden beds, recent plantings, timber front fence with gothic pickets in concave panels, and front gate. A pathway also led from Bowen Terrace towards the southern corner of the house, and to the front entrance porch and piazza.

The Trudes lived only intermittently at Feniton from late 1913, periodically occupying Endrim in Toowong, during absences of Phyllis's mother (Cristiana Mary Gore née Bernays) and sister who had moved to Brisbane after the death of her father, Gerard Ralph Gore. In the Trudes' absences, Feniton was rented to a Mrs King in 1913–14, and to Allan Jaffrey, Queensland Manager of Australian Estates in 1914–15. The Trudes finally settled at Endrim in 1916.

From 1916 Feniton was rented by Edward Granville ('Red Ted') Theodore (1884–1950), Member of the Queensland Legislative Assembly for Chillagoe, Deputy Premier, Treasurer, and Secretary for Public Works in Queensland's TJ Ryan's Labor Government. Theodore, a former union organiser and miner, entered the Queensland Parliament in 1909, aged 24.

Together with his wife Esther, née Mahoney, and four young children, Theodore occupied 388 Bowen Terrace for most of the next decade. In May 1918, the year before he became Premier, Theodore purchased Feniton, which he had already renamed Almaden (or Alma-den), after the mining town of Almaden near Chillagoe, North Queensland, where he had his first major victory as a union organiser in 1908 (the Etheridge Railway Strike). The residence was already called Almaden by August 1916, when Mrs EG Theodore, of "Almaden, Bowen Terrace", convened a meeting of ladies, from the surrounding suburbs, at the Social Services Institute in Brunswick Street for a Queensland Patriotic Fund effort.

Esther used the garden for fetes and other fund-raising activities as part of her work for philanthropic and patriotic causes. On 7 October 1916 a brass band as well as singers and other musicians performed in the garden at her fete for the war effort; and in August 1918 Esther invited a large party of guests to another fete at Almaden, this time in aid of the bachelor's stall at the coming fete for St Patrick's Church. For the 1918 fete the drawing-room was decorated with sweet peas, and the lawn was "festooned with flags". The grounds were "brilliantly lighted" at night, and sweets and flowers were sold. During a six-month overseas trip in 1924, Almaden was occupied by Frank Tenison Brennan, Theodore's Assistant Home Secretary and MLA for Toowoomba. While their parents were overseas, the two Theodore daughters boarded at Stuartholme Convent in Toowong and the elder boy at Christian Brothers' College, Nudgee. The youngest boy stayed at Almaden with Brennan and his wife.

Some changes to the gardens occurred under the Theodores, who increased the density of planting with trees, shrubs and flower beds, including a greenhouse in the front garden and a vegetable garden behind the house. By 1924 the front path from Bowen Terrace had been concreted. A 1930 photograph of the house shows flower beds in the front and southeast side gardens, with one palm tree near the southern corner of the house. A brick front fence with infill timber pickets existed by 1934, and a small addition to the northwest side of the house had been added by the 1930s.

Theodore also constructed a study and library for his book collection under the southern corner of the house and the front verandah. The large garden setback at Feniton would have afforded Theodore some privacy as he worked in his study under the house. To provide day-lighting, casement windows were cut in the weatherboard cladding of the understorey, and were protected by a continuous window shade. The front half of Theodore's study and its windows was later removed, with only a possible rear wall surviving under the house in 2018.

While residing at Almaden between 1916 and 1927, Theodore implemented important social, industrial and constitutional reforms in Queensland. As TJ Ryan's Treasurer and Secretary for Public Works, he established an arbitration system and state employment bureaux, and enacted legislation to provide for workers' compensation and regulate working conditions and accommodation. He also established a series of state enterprises, including butcher shops, fish shops, cattle stations, sawmills, mining ventures and a hotel. During World War I, he was instrumental in the Ryan Government's campaign against military conscription. In 1922, he completed Labor's campaign to abolish Queensland's Legislative Council, with Queensland becoming the only Australian state with a unicameral legislature. He was also the first Australian premier to raise government loans in America, and opened up the Dawson, Upper Burnett and Callide areas for closer settlement. To assist primary producers, he oversaw the creation of marketing boards, a state cannery, a cold store to hold perishable exports, and a new Agricultural Bank.

Theodore decided to enter federal politics, resigning as Premier in February 1925 to contest the federal seat of Herbert in north Queensland. Unsuccessful in his bid, he moved to Sydney in 1927 upon winning the NSW federal seat of Dalley at a by-election in January 1927. Theodore later served as Treasurer in the Scullin Labor Government and was Director-General of the Allied Works Council during World War II. He was also a founder of the Australian Women's Weekly and a developer of gold mines in Fiji before his death in 1950.

Theodore attempted to sell Almaden, but was unsuccessful and so rented it out for several years. In 1929–30 the house was rented by Norah Burrows, who ran it as a guest house called Garden of Kama, which she advertised as a "magnificent home". From June 1930 the house was rented by Louis Emanuel (Lee) Steindl, a former Maryborough brewer, who resided there with his wife Gertrude, née Brennan, and Gertrude's unmarried sisters, Florence and Winifred Brennan. (Gertrude, Florence and Winifred were the sisters of Frank Tenison Brennan.) While Theodore and his wife were out of the state in May–June 1927, a number of small precious items were stolen from a suitcase they had left stored in a bedroom at Almaden.

In March 1933, Almaden was sold to the Steindls, who during their occupation created a display garden containing flower beds of annuals, which had made the garden a local tourist attraction by 1934. Severe drought conditions and watering restrictions in 1936 negatively affected the display garden. The Steindls also used Almaden to host parties and dances.

In 1937 the Steindls subdivided the property, and in 1938 they sold 29.33 perches (742m2) of the southeast garden, which became the site of a two-storey brick house (built c.1940) at 404 Bowen Terrace. The sale of this land required the partial demolition of the piazza of Almaden, and its stair, and also separated Almaden from its former pedestrian entrance in the front brick fence, and the concrete path from Bowen Terrace. The Steindls, left with 1 rood, 11.14p (1293m2) of land, constructed a new front entry gate toward the northwest end of the front fence, with a new path to the front stair of the house. The new curving entrance path to Almaden is visible in 1942, as is the brick house at 404 Bowen Terrace, and the new tennis court behind it. In 2018 part of the straight section of Almaden's concreted path from the street still survives at 404 Bowen Terrace, alongside the northwest elevation of the brick house, but the remainder of this path, which curved to the front stair of Almaden, the piazza, and later to the east side of Theodore's study, no longer survived.

By 1979, the front entry porch and piazza had been enclosed with casement windows and doorways, and the southeast leg of the front stair had been removed.

After Gertrude Steindl's death in 1971, her daughter Vera inherited Almaden. The house was sold in 1988 to Albert Kuceli, who had founded Kuceli Real Estate in New Farm in 1965. Kuceli reopened the front entry porch and piazza and made other changes internally, while leaving the panelling and joinery of the principal rooms intact. The cladding below the front verandah and most of Theodore's study was demolished, with similar cladding added in line with the internal wall of the front verandah.

Kuceli made major changes to the gardens, including planting palms along the northwest boundary of the front garden, jacarandas on the southeast side of the front garden, adding a pond and fountain, forming new garden beds with stone or brick edging, and laying new brick paths. What had been an open front garden with some flower beds in 1942, and a few trees and shrubs by the 1960s, was lushly treed by the 1990s - resembling the time of the Theodore's occupation. Kuceli also replaced the former vegetable garden area at the rear with a swimming pool in the early 2000s. The swimming pool was built between 2001 and 2003.

Between 1979 and 2018, windows to the kitchen were removed and replaced by casements, and the adjoining section of wall was reclad to match existing fabric. Internally, the kitchen and back hall walls (including the wall, window and door that divided them and a store cupboard) and some bedroom walls were plastered over and corkboard laid over the floors. New skirting boards were installed in these locations. The pantry joinery and walls were removed and the area incorporated into the kitchen. The dressing room adjacent to the main bedroom was renovated as an ensuite and walk-in wardrobe. Some mantelpieces and mouldings which had previously been painted were stripped and refinished with clear varnish.

Feniton was added to the Brisbane Heritage Register in 2000, misspelling it as "Fenton", which is the name of the house (extant in 2018) that Dods built for himself in Sydney in 1919. Following Albert Kuceli's death in 2009, the property passed to his partner Carole Kotowski, who sold it to Judith Noble in 2012. The property was sold to Georgina Lalor in 2013, and to Strathallan Pty Ltd in 2015. In June 2017 the property was transferred to Dave & Dunc Pty Ltd. In February 2016, a development application was lodged over the site to reposition the house 6m from Bowen Terrace (instead of the original 25m setback), raise and build under it, and construct three townhouses, each three storeys high, to the rear abutting Oxley Lane. The application was refused on 1 July 2016 and a subsequent appeal to this decision was dismissed in the Planning and Environment Court in August 2017.

In 2018 Feniton continues to be used as a private residence, and retains most of its Dods' features and its Arts and Crafts aesthetic, including its solid and substantial form, dominant and steeply pitched roof, distinctive chimneys, materiality, partially enclosed understorey, well-proportioned rooms, interior timber joinery/mantlepieces, timber interior linings, generous verandahs and rear verandah louvres. It also retains its large front setback from Bowen Terrace, with views to and from the street.

== Description ==
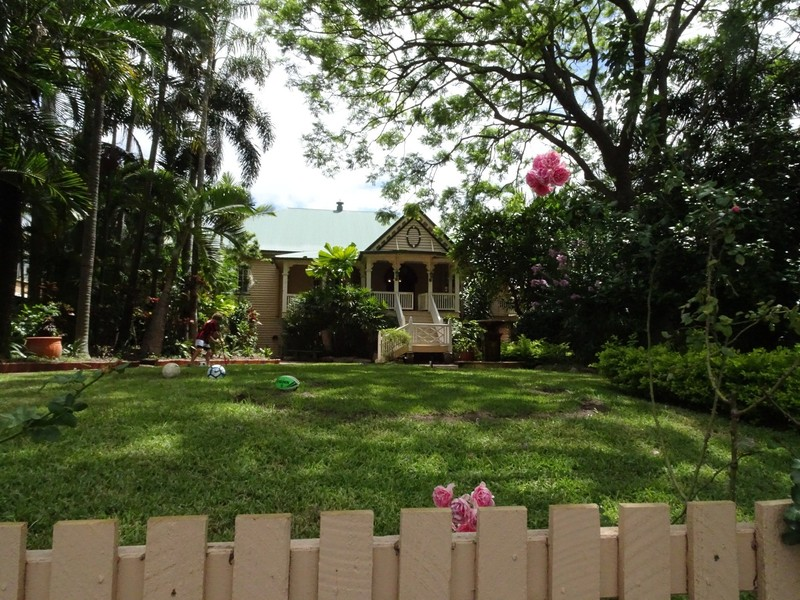
Front garden from Bowen Terrace, 2017

Feniton is a highset detached timber house located at 388 Bowen Terrace in the inner Brisbane suburb of New Farm, 2.8 kilometres from the centre of Brisbane on a 1,292m2 allotment. Built in 1906, this substantial dwelling set in spacious grounds, is in an Arts and Crafts style and demonstrates a high standard of design and quality. It has distinctive features that are characteristic of the domestic works of Robert Smith Dods and contribute to its aesthetic significance. It retains:

- evidence of careful siting to take best advantage of aspect, garden views and privacy;
- a solid and substantial appearance;
- overall form and massing combining symmetry within an asymmetrical form;
- a large and dominant roof;
- distinctive chimneys;
- verandahs of various widths in response to functional needs including verandah rooms/piazza;
- narrow weatherboards with mitred corners;
- oversized verandah posts;
- design for climate; innovative sub-tropical design features include orientation, planning to maximise ventilation and careful design of internal and external spaces.
- pleasing proportions;
- sparing use of ornament; and
- high quality materials and craftsmanship.

Feniton stands on the rear half and highest part of the allotment, facing southwest and sloping to Bowen Terrace with rear access off Oxley Lane to the northeast. It has a generous setback providing privacy and affording views to and from the house and Bowen Terrace across the garden. The siting of the house close to the northwest boundary optimises the natural light and ventilation to the principal external spaces - the piazza and front verandah.

=== Exterior ===
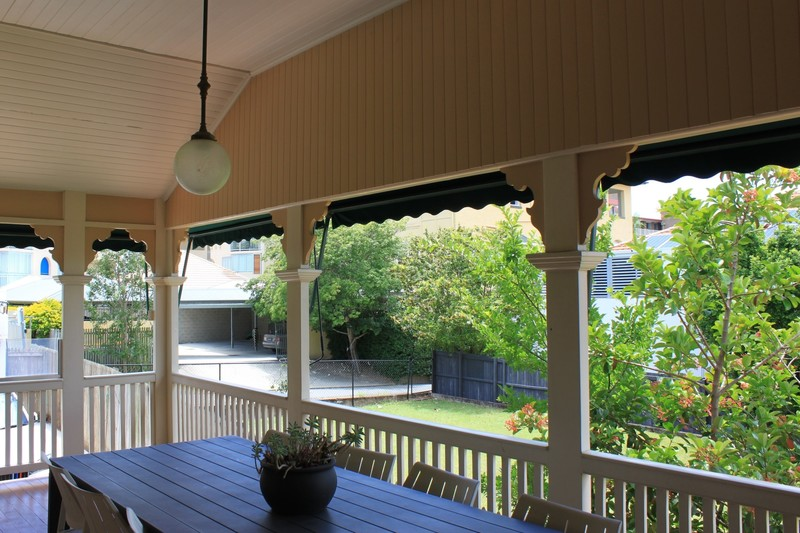
Piazza looking east, 2017

The house has a proportionally large, steeply pitched hipped roof with projecting gables over a front entrance porch and over a wide verandah "piazza" on the east corner (original stairs removed and reduced in overall size c. 1938). Two tall, brick chimneys (originally facebrick, now painted), venting the kitchen and drawing room/main bedroom fireplaces are distinctively utilitarian in design with simple, rectangular shafts and flat rendered cornices. The eaves are lined with either fibrous sheeting or tongue-and-groove v-jointed (vj) boards, which also line the verandah ceilings (the extent and detail of original eaves linings is unknown).

Although it is offset to the south, the dominant, projecting entrance implies symmetry to the front elevation through a classically derived pedimented gable supported on four posts. The large entrance porch with verandahs on both sides is accessed by a wide L-shaped stair. (One flight of the originally bifurcated stair and an overhead trellis have been removed and newel posts replaced).Across the porch, a wide pair of doors with decorative arched fanlight centred between bay windows to the dining room and drawing room, opens into the entrance hall. Original applied decoration was limited to a heavy timber dentil detail to the eaves, mouldings to the large, oval louvred wall vent and front door surround and simple verandah brackets. (verandah brackets have been replaced with ornate brackets and post mouldings added). All verandahs have a simple battened balustrade and handrail detail. (Handrails are comparable replacements to the original design and some balusters have been replaced but match existing).

A narrow northerly-facing verandah extends along the rear of the house to the east corner where it widens to form the piazza. Vertical timber louvres are fixed along this verandah above the battened balustrade providing privacy and solar protection to the bedrooms. The verandah and piazza walls have exposed framing and are lined with vj boards. A bay window from the main bedroom projects into the piazza (reduced c. 1938) which was a key feature designed as an outdoor living room to take advantage of the best aspect for light and ventilation.

Cross ventilation is also a clear consideration in the detailing of the house. Large French doors, wide windows and fanlights above door openings throughout provide for continuous air flow.

Contributing to the solid appearance of the house are oversized posts which support all verandah areas. Walls are generally clad with weatherboards. Original, narrow weatherboards with mitred corners are confined to the upper walls; the understorey walls, which provide the visually firm attachment with the ground are clad in wider weatherboards. The understorey at the rear of the house is lined with timber battens. Along the northwest side is a small verandah clad in weatherboards to handrail height, which has been enclosed with casement windows above. A timber stair leads to a path to the rear gate.

=== Interior ===
The floor plan incorporates a level of symmetry within an asymmetrical layout comprising living, sleeping and service zones. The entrance hall is formal and symmetrical with double doorways (doors to the drawing room have been removed) opening into a generous dining room on the left (northwest)and larger drawing room on the right (southeast) which opens onto the piazza. Through the finely detailed archway at the end of the entrance hall, a perpendicular hall provides access to the best bedroom and dressing room and leads to the spacious back hall. The kitchen, enclosed northwest verandah and two bedrooms open off the back hall. The northwest verandah has a laundry (a later addition) at its south end, and a stair to the back yard at its north end.

In the service area of the house, partitions between the kitchen and pantry rooms have been removed and the kitchen fireplace is partially rendered. A large window between the kitchen and back hall has been enclosed; and the back hall stair and cupboard opposite, removed. The back hall retains a glazed fanlight to the service verandah; the doors below have been removed.

Under the kitchen in the west corner of the understorey, accessed by the (removed) stair from the back hall, is the former laundry, which retains a concrete slab with spoon drain and evidence of a removed corrugated iron wall lining formed in the slab edge. The chimney breast in this space has a void and piping for a copper. Extending across the front of the house is a store room lined with recent sheeting which adjoins a workroom in the south corner lined with recycled vj boards that have been refixed upside down. This room, located partially within what is thought to have been Theodore's library, has concrete upstands around its perimeter. No definitive evidence of the library survives.

The walls of the dining room, entrance hall and transverse hall are lined with clear finished hoop pine VJ boards to picture rail height and painted above - a characteristic lining and finish of Dods' interiors. Also characteristic are built-in cupboards; in the dining room, there is a built-in sideboard and shelves and cupboards either side of the bay window. The north (former maid's) room has a painted vj lining and the remaining rooms have been relined and plaster cornices installed. An unusual feature in the drawing room and best bedroom is the evidence of flush-jointed wall linings which provided for a wallpaper finish and an early plaster lining in the bedroom bay window. Another unusual feature is the presence of a fireplace in the bedroom. Early joinery includes multi-paned double hung windows, wide multi-paned French doors and six-panelled doors with splayed panels and two-panel operable fanlights above. Casement windows are later additions.

=== Significant features ===
All 1906 fabric and design features are of state level significance, including concealed linings and decorative finishes.

== Heritage listing ==
Feniton was listed on the Queensland Heritage Register on 27 July 2018 having satisfied the following criteria.

The place is important in demonstrating the evolution or pattern of Queensland's history.

Feniton (1906–7), a surviving example of nationally acclaimed architect Robert Smith (Robin) Dods' "first quality" suburban timber houses from the middle period of Hall & Dods' practice 1901–09, is important in demonstrating Dods' contribution to the evolution of Queensland's architecture.

As a substantial, architect-designed house, which was constructed for John Elworthy Trude, a director and local manager for Australian tea merchants Atcherley and Dawson, and set in a large garden, Feniton is important in demonstrating the lifestyle of Brisbane's prosperous elite in the inner suburbs of Brisbane during the early 20th century.

The place is important in demonstrating the principal characteristics of a particular class of cultural places.

Feniton, a substantial residence designed by influential architect Robin Dods, is a fine, largely intact example of Dods' high quality residential work, which is characterised by a pervading sense of tradition, solidity, and an honest use of materials. It is important in demonstrating the principal characteristics of that work, retaining its steep, hipped, dominant roof; pedimented gables; generous verandahs and carefully orientated piazza with a northeast aspect; oversized timber elements and openings; mitred weatherboards; pleasing proportions and restrained decoration; and finely detailed, clear finished joinery, including built-in timber furniture. Its siting, detailing and unconventional but rational planning optimise views, cross ventilation and solar orientation.

The place is important because of its aesthetic significance.

Feniton is considered significant for its Federation aesthetic, combining Arts and Crafts; and Classical elements. The villa is considered to be a well preserved example of an upper-class building of the time.

The place has a special association with the life or work of a particular person, group or organisation of importance in Queensland's history.

Feniton, occupied by Edward Granville "Red Ted" Theodore (1884–1950) as his family home from 1916 to 1927, has a special association with the life and work of Theodore as his place of residence and work when he was Premier of Queensland (1919–25). Theodore renamed Feniton "Almaden", after the site of a strike victory during his union career. As Premier, Theodore implemented important social, industrial and constitutional reforms in Queensland, including state intervention in the economy and completing Labor's campaign to abolish Queensland's Legislative Council, and is a person of importance in Queensland's history.
