= Mount Carmel Convent =

Mount Carmel Convent (former)
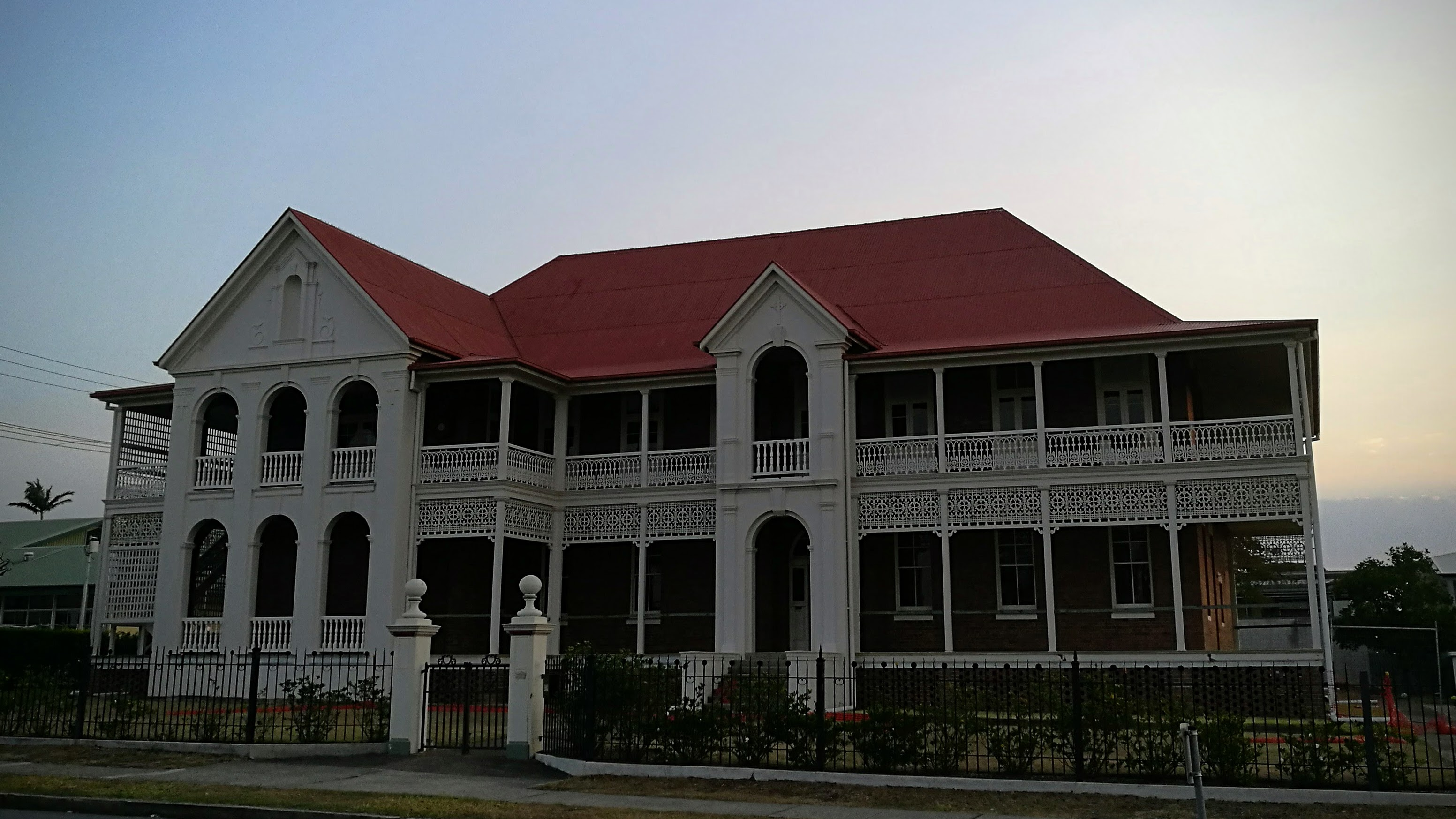
- Mount Carmel Convent, 2017

- Location within Queensland

Monastery information
- Full name: Convent of Our Lady of Mount Carmel
- Order: Sisters of Mercy
- Denomination: Roman Catholic
- Established: 8 August 1915
- Disestablished: 2011 (as a convent)
- Archdiocese: Brisbane

People
- Founder: Archbishop James Duhig

Architecture
- Status: Convent (1915–2011)
- Functional status: Residence and bed-and-breakfast accommodation
- Architect: Hall & Dods
- Style: Classicism

Site
- Location: 199 Bay Terrace, Wynnum, City of Brisbane, Queensland
- Country: Australia
- Coordinates: 27°26′47″S 153°10′33″E

Designations

Queensland Heritage Register
- Official name: Mount Carmel Convent
- Type: State heritage (landscape, built)
- Designated: 27 August 1999
- Reference no.: 601730
- Significant period: 1910s–1920s (historical); 1910s (fabric) ongoing (social)
- Significant components: Views to, convent/nunnery, garden/grounds
- Builders: William Richard Juster

Mount Carmel Convent is a heritage-listed Roman Catholic former convent at 199 Bay Terrace, Wynnum, City of Brisbane, Queensland, Australia. It was designed by Hall & Dods and built in 1915 by William Richard Juster. It was added to the Queensland Heritage Register on 27 August 1999.

The building operated as a convent from 1915 until 2011 and has subsequently been sold and renovated as a residence with bed-and-breakfast accommodation.

== History ==
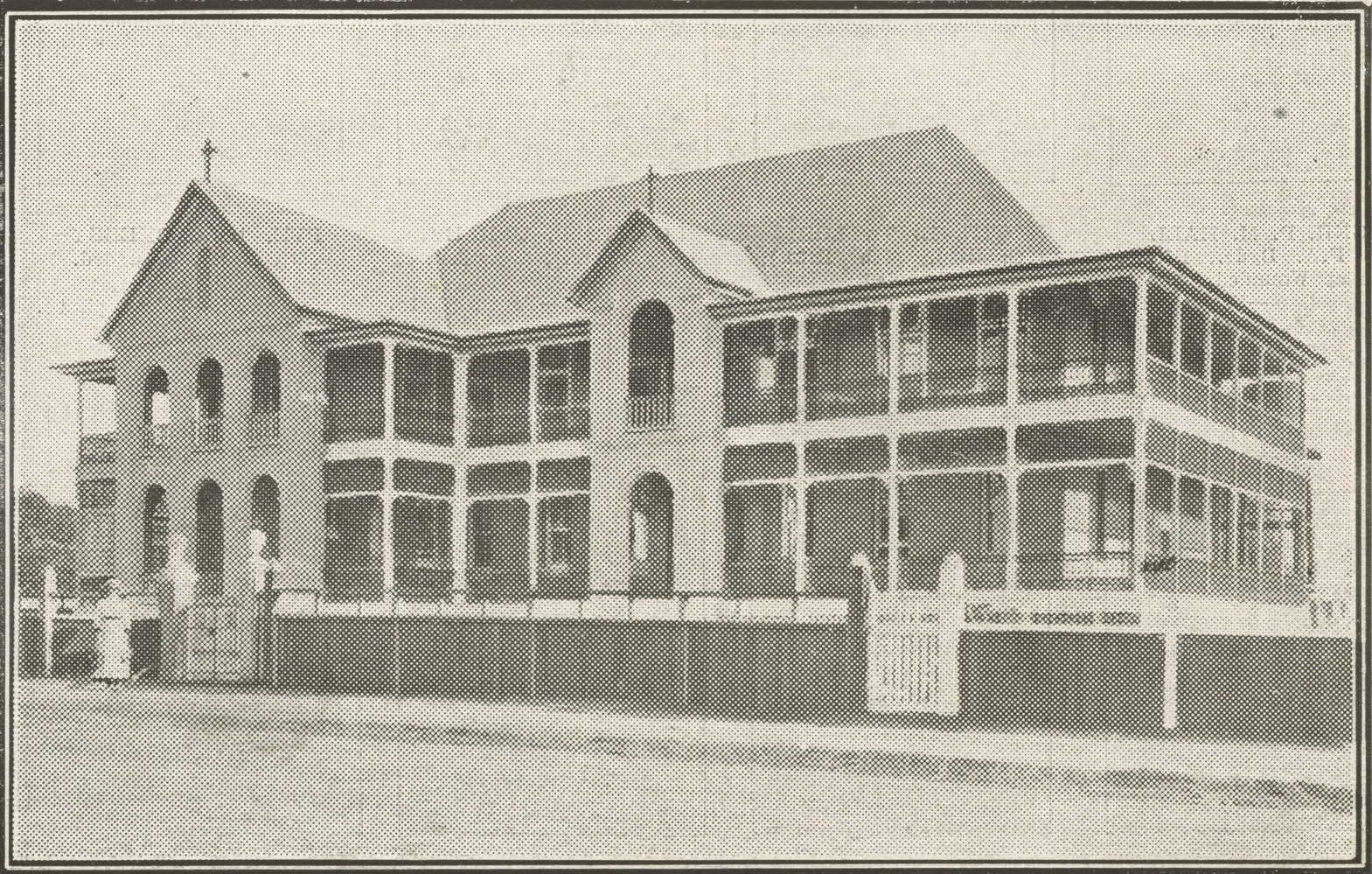
Mount Carmel Convent, Wynnum, 1915

Mt Carmel Convent, a substantial two storey brick building with surrounding verandahs, was constructed in 1915 as a convent for the Sisters of Mercy. It was designed by the architectural partnership of Hall and Dods and constructed by William Richard Juster at a cost of £8000.

A Catholic presence in Wynnum was prompted by the establishment of the area as a popular seaside resort. The opening of the Wynnum South railway station in 1898 encouraged further development, and the demand for a religious presence in the area grew. In 1903, the first Catholic masses were held in the Shire Hall, and the Sisters of Mercy began visiting Wynnum to teach the children residing in the area.

Established primarily as a teaching order in 1831 in Ireland by Catherine McAuley, the first Sisters of Mercy arrived in Brisbane in 1861. Various orders were later established throughout Queensland to ensure children gained adequate education and religious instruction.

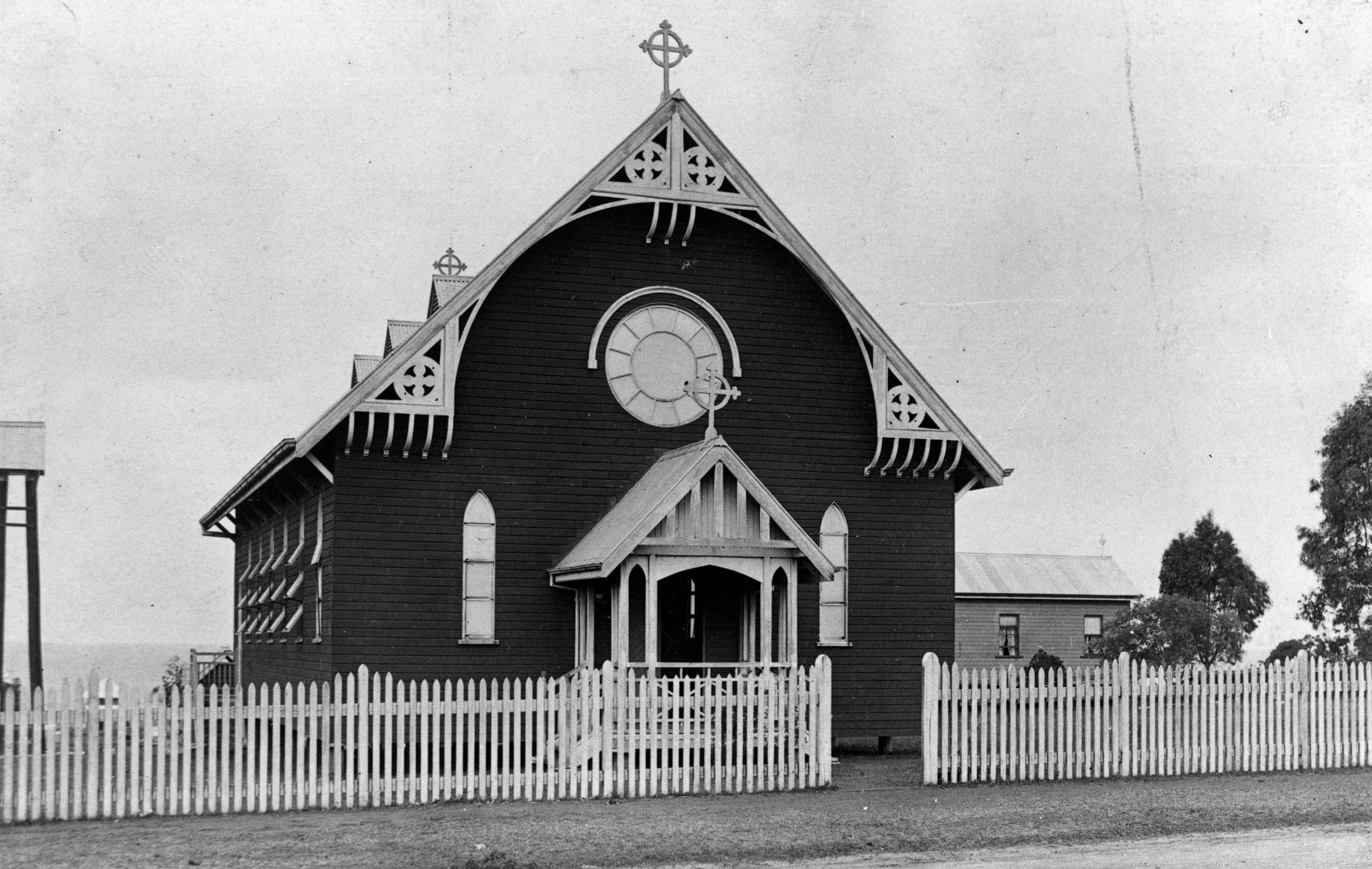
Guardian Angels Catholic Church, 1910

The first Catholic church in Wynnum, known as the Catholic Church of Guardian Angels was erected in 1905. Designed by architect Richard Gailey it was constructed on Bay Terrace on land donated by Archbishop Robert Dunne. Following the formal establishment of the parish of Wynnum in 1913, a new school also designed by Gailey and located in Bay Terrace, was opened.

On 8 August 1915 "the Convent of Our Lady of Mount Carmel was solemnly blessed and dedicated by His Grace, Archbishop Duhig." A collection which realised £110 for the furnishing fund was taken up during the opening ceremony.

Designed by architects Francis Richard Hall and Robert Smith (Robin) Dods, the convent was described in The Age as a "handsome 2 storey brick building situated on a commanding eminence on the west side of Bay Terrace." The article continues:

"The building is built of brick; wide verandahs and balconies extend round the main block. On the ground floor on both sides of the main entrance are parlours, the one on the right giving access to the music room, and the one on the left to the chapel through the sacristy. The children's study and refectory are entered from a corridor running at right angles on either side of the entrance hall. This corridor also gives direct access to the chapel, sister's dormitory, main staircase, music room and service passage and stairs. The sister's dormitory is connected with the chapel by sliding doors. The first floor is occupied with two large and five smaller cells, community room and children's dormitory. Spacious lavatory and bathroom accommodation on this floor completes the main block. A separate block comprises the kitchen, offices and laundry on the ground floor and a large dormitory and servants quarters on the first floor. This block is connected with the verandah and balcony of the main block by a covered way."

The partnership of Hall and Dods was established in 1896 and continued until 1916. Dods was appointed architect to the Anglican Diocese of Brisbane and the firm oversaw the construction of St John's Cathedral in this capacity. They also designed many buildings for the Roman Catholic Archdiocese of Brisbane, including St Brigids Catholic Church, Red Hill and the Mater Misericordiae Hospital.

In 1940, additions were made to the church by Francis Leo Cullen. Alterations and additions were also made to the convent, school and presbytery at this time, possibly by Cullen also.

In 1957, a secondary girls school was established at Mount Carmel and continued to operate until 1992 when it was closed due to the falling numbers of school-aged children in the area. The Guardian Angels primary school remains operational.

In 1999, the convent housed only four Sisters permanently and was mainly used as a holiday centre for Sisters of Mercy in the Southern Queensland region.

In 2011, only two sisters were living in the property and it was sold for A$1.6 million to Ivan Simon. For the following three years, the property was extensively renovated at a cost of A$1 million, after which the Brisbane City Council gave approval for it to be used as a residence with bed-and-breakfast accommodation.

== Description ==
Mount Carmel Convent, a two storeyed brick building with a corrugated iron roof, is located in a prominent position in Bay Terrace, Wynnum. It is surrounded by minimal gardens and lawned areas which are enclosed by a recent metal fence incorporating an earlier wrought iron gate.

The building itself is asymmetrical in plan and is constructed of glazed face brick laid in English bond. The building comprises a main wing running parallel to Bay Terrace, with a transverse wing at the southeastern end. Verandahs encircle the entire building on both levels, with a combination of cast iron and timber balustrading and ripple iron sheeted ceilings. Windows are double hung with clear glass, apart from those in the chapel which feature leadlighting. French doors provide access to the verandahs from most rooms. A single storeyed building containing the kitchen and laundry is located at the rear of the main building, attached to it by breezeways which have been enclosed with aluminium framed windows.

The entry is centrally located within the main wing and is defined by a rendered archway rising through the two storeys. The entry door is located within a timber framed arch and leadlighting is featured in the side panels. A second rendered archway is located on the front elevation of the transverse wing, with a statue of Mary and Jesus featured in the gable above.

Internally the layout remains relatively intact, apart from the main dormitory for boarders on the upper level, which has been divided into smaller rooms. Two parlours (one now an office) open from the entry, and leadlight doors open onto a hallway which runs parallel to Bay Terrace. The dining room is located behind this and the hall terminates at the chapel which is located in the transverse wing. The main stair is located between the dining room and the chapel. It comprises a half turn with two landings and features a simply designed dark stained timber balustrade. A secondary stair is located at the northwestern end of the building.

The upper level is also divided by a central hall, with cells opening from both sides. Two large rooms, now used as recreational rooms are located in the transverse wing. Bathrooms and toilets are located on the enclosed rear verandah and an external stair, enclosed by lattice is located on the southeastern verandah.

== Heritage listing ==
Mount Carmel Convent was listed on the Queensland Heritage Register on 27 August 1999 having satisfied the following criteria.

The place is important in demonstrating the evolution or pattern of Queensland's history.

Constructed in 1915, Mount Carmel Convent demonstrates the evolution of the Order of the Sisters of Mercy and the educational, religious and social practices they implemented throughout Queensland.

The place is important in demonstrating the principal characteristics of a particular class of cultural places.

The place demonstrates the principal characteristics of a convent building, including a two storeyed plan featuring a chapel, dining area, reception rooms and cells. Finishes are typical of the period and include pressed metal ceilings, dark stained timber detailing simple decorative features and cast iron balustrades to the exterior verandahs. Its prominent location on the rise of a hill overlooking Moreton Bay is also typical of convent buildings.

The place is important because of its aesthetic significance.

Mount Carmel Convent is of aesthetic significance due to its well-composed design which, externally features a combination of decorative elements including cast iron and timber balustrades, glazed face brick walls with rendered sections, timber latticework and a statue of Mary and Jesus in the south eastern gable. Interior features including pressed metal ceilings, stained glass and leadlight windows, and arts and crafts style timber balustrades and joinery contribute to the aesthetic value of the place.

The place has a strong or special association with a particular community or cultural group for social, cultural or spiritual reasons.

The Convent has strong associations with the local community, and with the Sisters of Mercy, who use it as a holiday retreat during the summer months.

The place has a special association with the life or work of a particular person, group or organisation of importance in Queensland's history.

It also has strong associations with the architectural partnership of Hall and Dods, who are highly regarded for their early 20th century ecclesiastical work.
