= Residence, Abbott Street =

Residence, Abbot Street, New Farm
- Location within Queensland Location within Australia
- 27.4707°S 153.0451°E
- Location: 41 Abbott Street, New Farm, City of Brisbane, Queensland, Australia

History
- Design period: 1900–1914 (early 20th century)
- Built: 1900

Site notes
- Architect: Robin Dods

Queensland Heritage Register
- Official name: Residence, Abbot Street, Hart Residence, Narallen
- Type: state heritage (built)
- Designated: 28 April 2000
- Reference no.: 601020
- Significant period: 1900s (fabric, historical)
- Significant components: residential accommodation – main house, service wing

The Residence at 41 Abbott Street is a heritage-listed detached house in New Farm, City of Brisbane, Queensland, Australia. It was designed by Robin Dods and built in 1900. It is also known as Hart Residence and Narallen. It was added to the Queensland Heritage Register on 28 April 2000.

== History ==
The residence was designed by Robin Dods as a rental house for his mother, and constructed in 1900. The residence was built adjacent to Dods' own house.

With the closure of the Moreton Bay penal settlement in 1842 Brisbane was opened up for free settlement; however, surveyors had begun subdivision plans for the New Farm area as early as 1839 and large acreage blocks were auctioned through the 1840s and 1850s. Throughout the 1850s the adjacent Fortitude Valley had begun to develop into a residential area, as more suburban allotments were offered for sale. The push towards New Farm was slow and did not take hold until the mid-1860s. Barrister and later Queensland Premier, Samuel Griffith purchased part of New Farm in 1870. Queensland National Bank manager, Edward Robert Drury joined the gathering social elite in 1875, purchasing acreage and constructing his residence on Bowen Terrace. Suburban residential development had extended solidly onto the New Farm peninsula by 1883–1884. This growth was accompanied by the introduction of a public transport system which was to have a major impact on Brisbane's suburban development. In 1884 the privately owned Metropolitan Tramway and Investment Company laid Brisbane's first tram tracks. Electrification of the tramway system in Brisbane commenced in 1895. By this time, although industries were established in the New Farm area, significant residential development had continued. Private buses also provided residents with transport in the late 19th and early 20th centuries.

The Deed of Grant for the land on which the residence was to be built was granted to John McConnell in January 1845. Title for the property was transferred to Elizabeth Gray Marks, mother of Robin Dods, in June 1899. The following year, Dods had designed houses for himself and his mother. Situated on adjoining properties, these were constructed in 1900. Elizabeth Marks died in July 1908, however, the house stayed within the family for the next 70 years.

Dods, together with Francis Richard Hall, practising as Hall and Dods, is credited with achieving "an architectural revolution in Brisbane." For his houses and smaller buildings, Dods reassessed local timber construction, refining familiar elements. His planning and detailing of verandahs and external stairs and his ventilated roofs and gable decorations were widely imitated. Other ideas, such as his use of blind bay windows on narrow sites and his weatherboard enclosure of stumps, remain characteristic of his work alone.

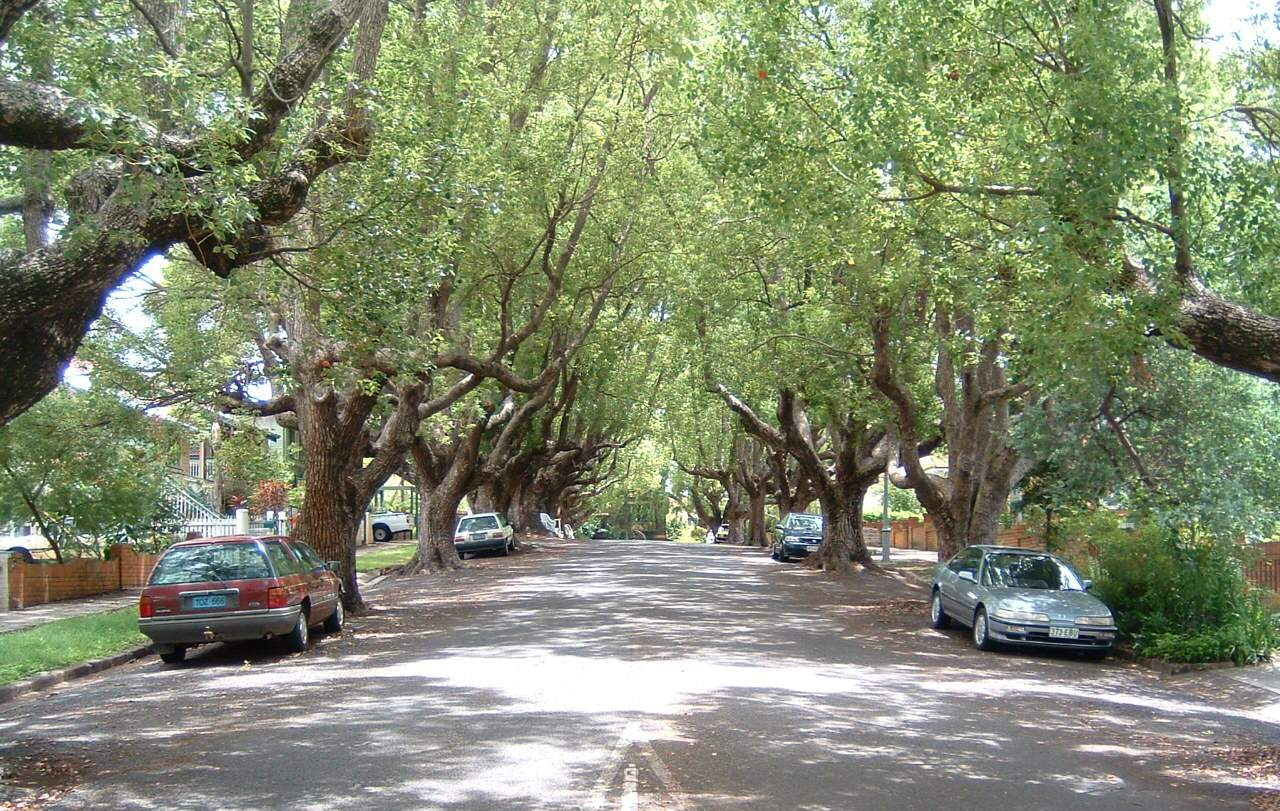
Abbott Street, New Farm, 2005

The residence has been identified as forming part of the Significant Character Items outlined in Brisbane City Council's New Farm Teneriffe Hill Heritage and Character Study, within the Sydney Street precinct. Sydney Street is one of the earliest streets established in New Farm. A number of important architect designed houses occur along its tree lined length and in the streets to either side. From Brunswick Street, Sydney Street, rises gently up to Abbott Street. Dods' own house was sold when he moved to Sydney in 1913 and c. 1970 was demolished when a block of units was constructed. Some alterations have been undertaken to the Abbott Street residence; however, the house is still reasonably intact and remains as a good example of Dods' domestic architecture.

== Description ==
The residence is a single-storey timber building, with brick fireplaces and chimneys, with a steeply pitched corrugated iron roof. An upper floor with a dormer window, added in 1999, faces Abbott Street. The eastern and northern elevations have verandahs and the western elevation extends over a laundry built at ground level with timber lattice work for additional protection. The verandah remains substantially intact, apart from a section near the kitchen which has been enclosed.

Internally, rooms open to adjacent verandahs with wide French doors with breezeway assemblies. The dining room has a fireplace with marble surrounds and a "blind" bay window - a device Dods used to facilitate views towards the street or garden, but not towards the neighbouring house. The kitchen has a bay window, which is a recent addition, along the southern wall.

== Heritage listing ==
Residence, Abbot Street was listed on the Queensland Heritage Register on 28 April 2000 having satisfied the following criteria.

The place is important in demonstrating the evolution or pattern of Queensland's history.

The residence is significant in demonstrating the continued growth of the New Farm area in the early part of the 20th century, following solid suburban residential development in the mid-1880s.

The place is important in demonstrating the principal characteristics of a particular class of cultural places.

The residence displays many characteristics which Dods valued in domestic architecture. These characteristics include a concern for climate, illustrated by the orientation and planning, provision of verandahs and large doors and the large, sheltering roof with ventilated ridge; concern for tradition, illustrated by the timber construction, well crafted from quality materials; concern for proportion and detail, evident in the substantial verandah posts and brackets. Internally, the blind bay window, characteristic of Dods' work, is still extant.

The place is important because of its aesthetic significance.

The residence is significant for it contribution to the historic Sydney Street precinct, which incorporates Abbott Street. Apart from the loss of Dods' own house, much of the original housing stock remains.

The place has a strong or special association with a particular community or cultural group for social, cultural or spiritual reasons.

The residence has been identified as forming part of the Significant Character Items outlined in Brisbane City Council's New Farm Teneriffe Hill Heritage and Character Study.

The place has a special association with the life or work of a particular person, group or organisation of importance in Queensland's history.

The residence was designed by Robin Dods, generally acknowledged as one of the best architects to practice in Brisbane. Dods is noted for the introduction of new ideas on architectural design which were then current in the United Kingdom which, subsequently, influenced Australian architecture.
