= Maryborough City Hall =

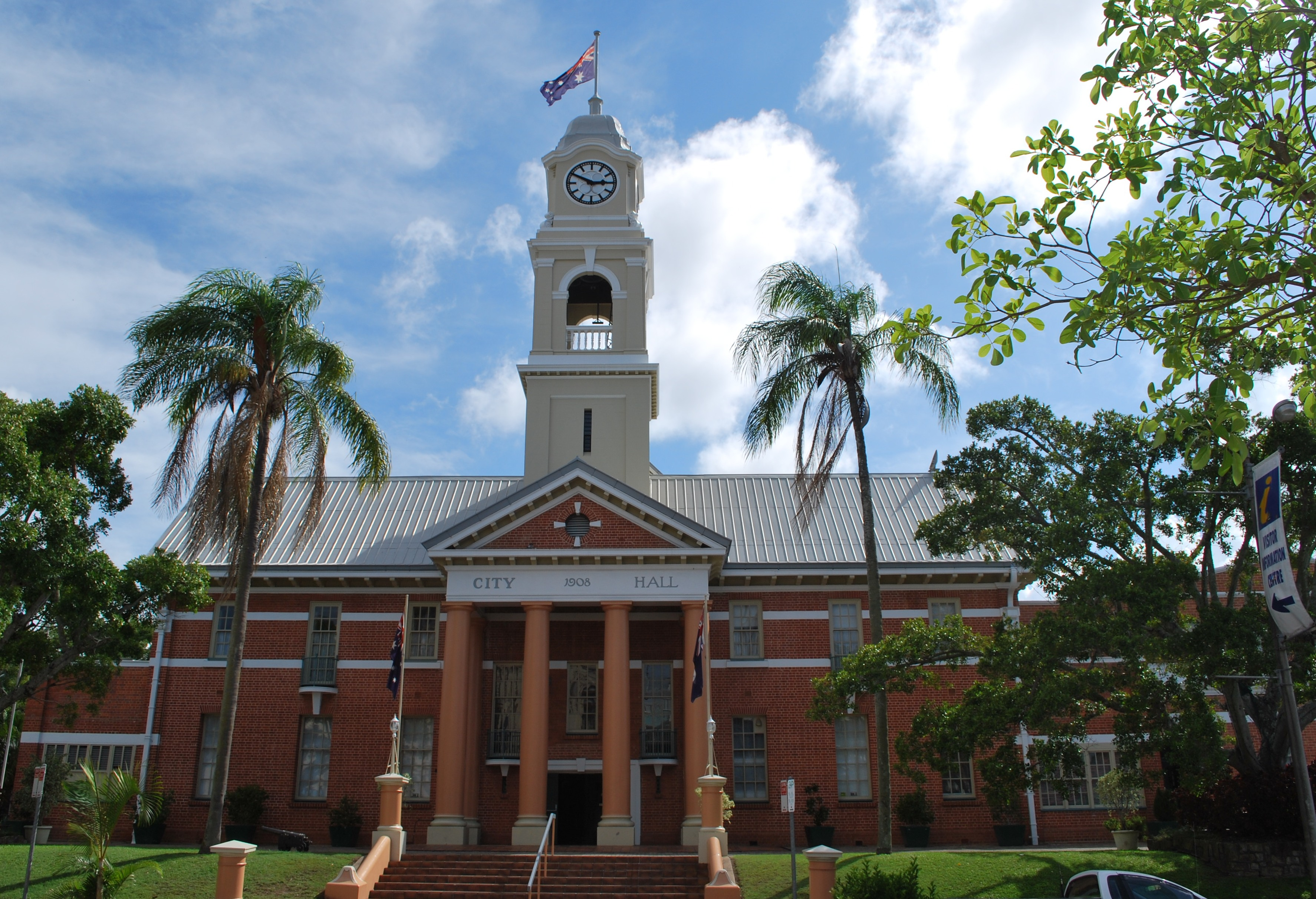
- Maryborough City Hall, 2008

- Location within Queensland Location within Australia
- 25.5378°S 152.7017°E
- Location: 388 Kent Street, Maryborough, Fraser Coast Region, Queensland, Australia

History
- Design period: 1900–1914 (early 20th century)
- Built: 1906–1908

Site notes
- Architect: Hall & Dods
- Architectural style: Classicism

Queensland Heritage Register
- Official name: Maryborough City Hall, Maryborough Town Hall
- Type: state heritage (built)
- Designated: 21 October 1992
- Reference no.: 600698
- Significant period: 1906–1978 (fabric); 1906–ongoing (historical, social); 1850s/1860s (archaeological potential)
- Significant components: gallery, garden/grounds, tower – fly, tower – clock, council chamber/meeting room, memorial – honour board/ roll of honour, auditorium, office/s
- Builders: Crystall & Armstrong

Maryborough City Hall is a heritage-listed town hall at 388 Kent Street, Maryborough, Fraser Coast Region, Queensland, Australia. It was designed by Hall & Dods and built from 1906 to 1908 by Crystall & Armstrong. It is also known as Maryborough Town Hall. It was added to the Queensland Heritage Register on 21 October 1992.

== History ==
Replacing a smaller timber building constructed on a different site, the Maryborough City Hall was built in 1908 as the second Maryborough Town Hall. The building was designed by renowned Queensland architectural partnership, Hall and Dods.

The original township of Maryborough was situated, not in its current place, but on the north of the Mary River, after wharves were established in 1847–1848, to provide transport for wool from sheep stations on the Burnett River. In 1852 the growing town was gradually transferred further north where ships were able to better navigate the river. Development followed and by March 1861, Maryborough was declared a municipality, the Borough of Maryborough, and Henry Palmer was appointed as the first Mayor. Meetings of the newly formed Council were held in various buildings until 1874 when a timber Town Hall was constructed, adjacent to the School of Arts in Kent Street. A Deed of Grant had been issued for the land in 1868 but construction of the building did not occur for several years. During the late 1860s and 1870s Maryborough developed rapidly as the port for the nearby gold rushes in the Gympie area. The new town hall, which was erected for about £400 was opened in 1876, although not finished until 1879.

Dissatisfaction with the first town hall was voiced in the local press for many years, and attempts were made at various stages throughout the nineteenth century to replace the timber Town Hall with a masonry building reflecting the importance of Maryborough in regional Queensland. In 1884, the Maryborough Council sought permission from the Queensland Government to exchange the land on which the Town Hall was built with land on the opposite side of Kent street facing the Town Hall, then used as a police and justice reserve. Though this permission was given in 1901 the construction of a new town hall did not commence until the several years after.

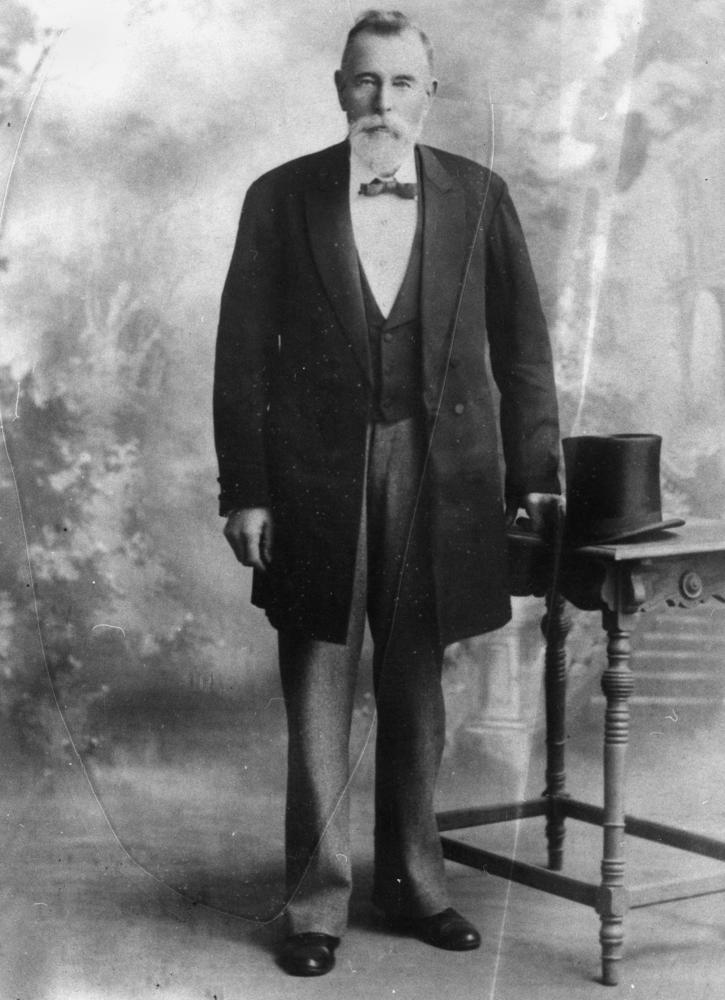
George Ambrose White, circa 1889

Lack of funds at the Council delayed the construction of a new Town Hall and meetings and business continued in the early timber building until 1908 when the current Town Hall was opened. Funding for the Town Hall was not forthcoming from the Council, but from a local benefactor, Mr George Ambrose White who donated £10,000 for the sole purpose of constructing a new Town Hall. Although generous this gift was to be offset by an annual payment by the Council to Mr White of 5% of the amount. White previously donated money for the construction of a public swimming pool in Maryborough and therefore he was already well known in the local community.

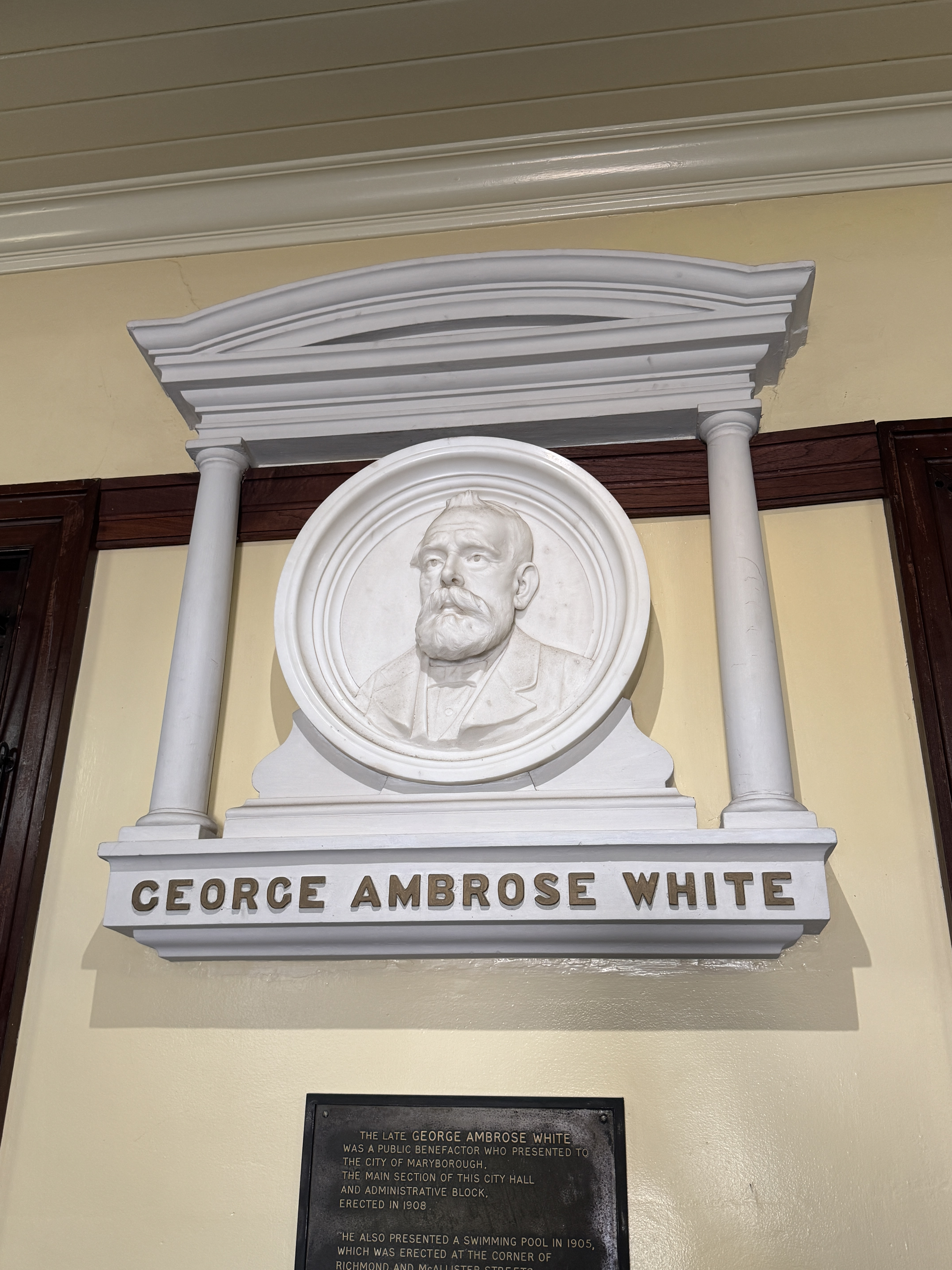
This bust of George Ambrose White is affixed to the main wall of the foyer at the entrance to the Maryborough City Hall.

In 1906, work began on the new site in Kent Street, removing the early police and justice buildings many of which survived from the initial development of Maryborough in the 1850s and 1860s. An inspector's residence, stockade and stables were removed to the new police site in Lennox Street where a police station designed by the Public Works Department was being constructed. As well many buildings were removed from the site and sold including a court house, disused since the construction of a new court house in Richmond Street in 1877, lock-up, cells and police quarters.

What remained was for the Council to procure the services of an architect to design their new Town Hall, to be a fitting symbol of Maryborough's prominence. Initially it was thought that a competition to be assessed by Leslie Corrie, President of the Queensland Institute of Architects, along with Mr Alfred Barton Brady, the Queensland Government Architect and a member of the council, would discover the most suitable design for the Town Hall. However this plan was abandoned when the assessors' fees and prize money was deemed to be too costly. Enquiries were made into which architects might be most suitable for the work and these pointed to the prominent Brisbane partnership of Francis Hall and Robin (Robert Smith) Dods. The Mayor travelled to Brisbane to interview Hall and Dods and they were commissioned to produce designs for the new Town Hall.

Hall and Dods formed in 1896 when Dods won a competition for the design of the nurses' home at the Brisbane General Hospital. By 1906 the partnership was one of the premier architectural firms in Brisbane, achieving, in the words of local architect Arnold Edwin Brooks, "an architectural revolution in Brisbane" resulting largely from Dods' architectural sophistication and innovation from his professional experience in Britain where he became well versed in both the aesthetics and philosophical background of both the Arts and Crafts movement and Edwardian Classicism. Hall and Dods' projects was wide-ranging and included hospital, ecclesiastical, domestic and commercial work.

After preparing plans and specifications for the Maryborough Town Hall, Robin Dods was invited to a special meeting of the Maryborough Council to discuss the plans which were adopted in October 1906. The design for the town hall was a substantial brick building with steeply pitched gabled roof and four Tuscan Order columns defining the portico. The building reflected the Victorian ideal of municipal buildings strongly influenced by classicism, in this case stripped and manipulated with the sophistication characteristic of the work of Hall and Dods. The building was designed to house a 900-seat auditorium, council offices and a council chamber.

Tenders were called in December 1906 for the construction of the Town Hall, and that of local contractors, Crystall and Armstrong for £8976/13/5 was accepted and completion was to be within twelve months. A Clerk of Works, Mr Sayers from Sydney, was appointed to oversee the work. Among the other contractors were Fairlie and Sons who completed the timberwork including the internal joinery, G Horbourgh and Co who undertook the plumbing, Mr Fulsig the painting, and Messrs Walker the ironwork, including the rib and pan roof. Messrs Rolley and Pagett of Brisbane supplied the patented casement openers for the side casement windows. Local bricks from Meredith Brickworks were used on a foundation of cement blocks cast on site. The auditorium was supplied with 500 bentwood chairs from Finney Isles and Co, with older chairs and forms supplementing this seating.

After some delays the new Town Hall was opened by the leader of the Federal Labour Party, the Hon Andrew Fisher, MHR. The building was received with mixed reviews, the Maryborough community, as expressed in the local papers described the building as plain and with a quality of "red-brickiness" whereas the national architectural journal, Building, praised its "simplicity with dignity in a splendid fashion". The interior of the building was more universally appealing with well crafted internal moulding and joinery and well proportioned rooms. The final cost of the building was £9,000.

Soon after the opening, plans were made to alter the entrance stairs to a design of George Halibut and this saw outward sweeps added to the stair and plinths for lighting incorporated. The council also undertook landscaping work to improve the surrounds of the building. The next additions were made in 1918 when four honour rolls, made by Fairlie and Sons, were erected in the auditorium.

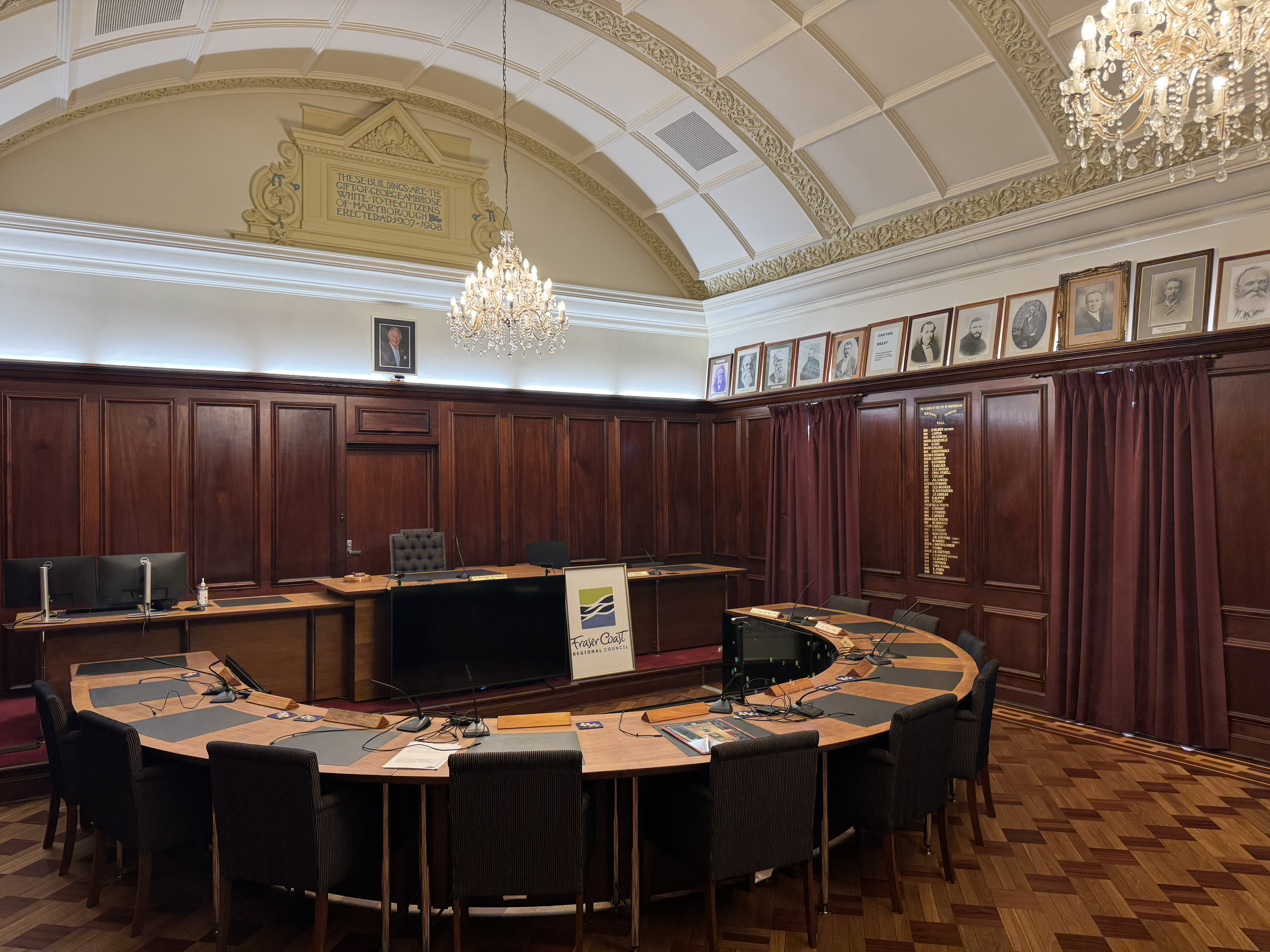
The council chambers is the primary meeting room in Maryborough City Hall.

Substantial additions were made to the Town Hall in 1934 to the design of Brisbane City Council architect, Walter Kerrison who was on loan to the Maryborough City Council. These additions included the erection of a clock tower, the construction of a fly tower and the widening and lengthening of verandahs flanking the auditorium. In 1948 a single storeyed extension to the western side of the building was added to supplement office accommodation in the building. This was designed by Colin Tesch. A second storey was added to this section in 1978. The lettering above the entrance door, which on completion of the building in 1908 was "TOWN HALL" was changed to "CITY HALL" in 1964, although Maryborough was proclaimed a city much earlier in 1905. In 1971 other alterations were made to the entrance doors to the design of architect, Werner Hug.

In 1990 a serious fire by an arsonist substantially damaged some of the building interior. Restoration and reconstruction work was undertaken by Brisbane architect, Robert Riddel.

The most recent alterations to the building relate to the public toilets that are accessed off of the Town Hall Green. Finished in 2022 and named the Cistern Chapel, the toilets are managed by a group of volunteers and welcome many visitors.

The building is the subject of a history book by the current Fraser Coast Mayor, George Seymour called "A Visit to Maryborough City Hall"

== Description ==
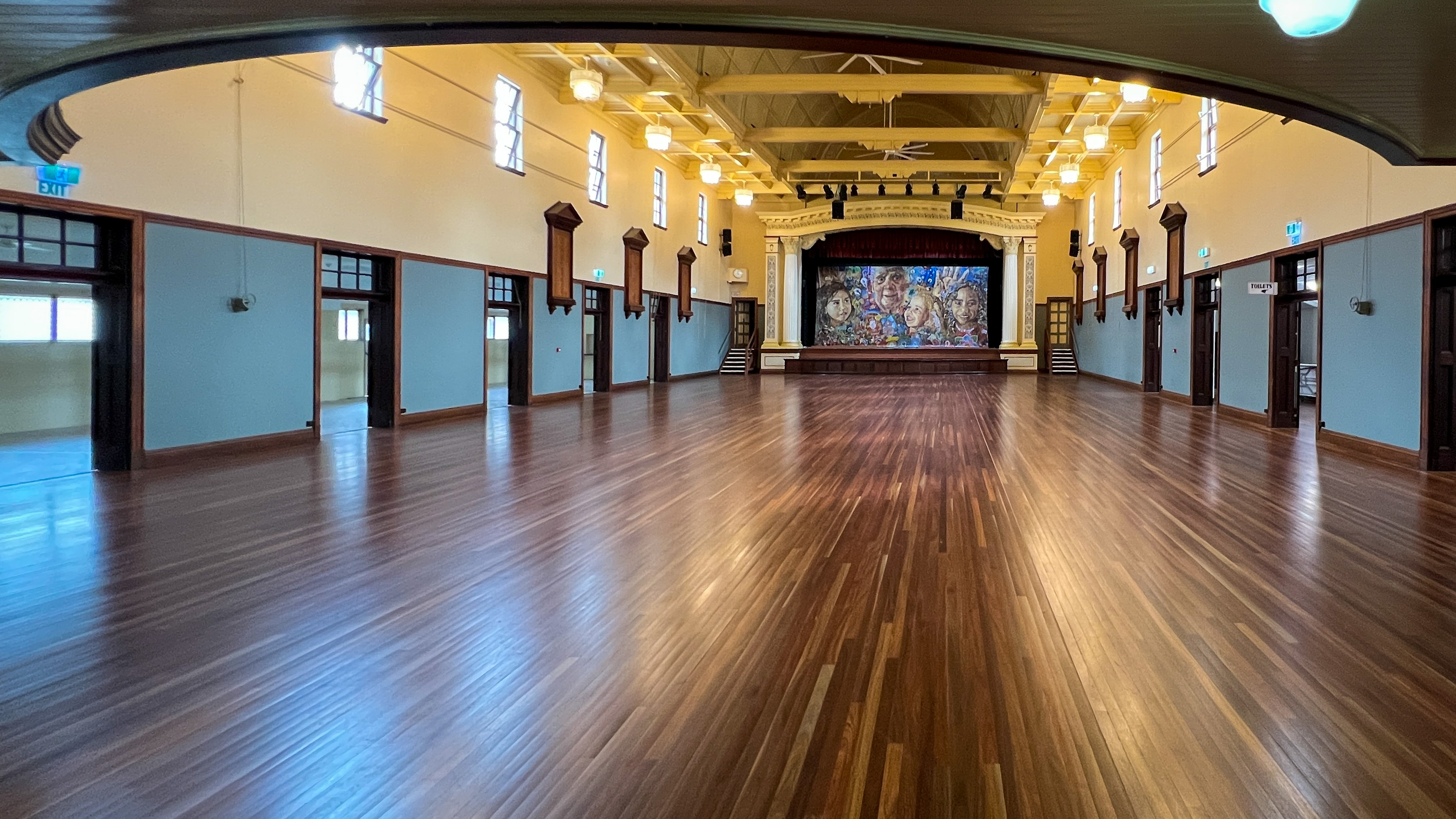
Interior of the auditorium, 2023

The Maryborough City Hall is prominently located on the corner of Kent and Lennox Streets, in the central business district of Maryborough. The building is surrounded by grassed embankments to Kent Street and lawn areas and formal garden beds to Lennox Street.

The City Hall comprises a number of sections: the original building being two intersecting gabled wings, one wing forming the administration offices and principal entrance to the hall in a gabled sections running parallel to Kent Street, and centrally abutting the rear, south-western side of this another gabled section of the same height housing the auditorium. Joining this, to the south west again, a large stuccoed fly tower was added. More recently, a two storeyed administration block was added to the northern corner of the original building.

The original sections of the City Hall are constructed from face brickwork with white limed tuckpointing and regular bands of smooth faced stucco. The two storeyed Kent Street section is dominated by a large central pedimented portico supported on six two-storeyed Doric columns on the entablature above which is the lettering "CITY 1908 HALL". A triangular pediment above this is filled with brickwork and has a central oculus. Flanking the portico are a series of three square arched window openings, taller on the ground floor. The central, first floor, window on each side is lengthened to form a door and a small semi circular Juliet balcony surrounds this. These balconies are visually supported on large oversized keystones above the corresponding openings on the ground floor level.

Rising from the rib-and-pan roof of this section of the building, is a three storeyed stuccoed clock tower, with balustraded openings on the second floor and a four-faced clock in the section above. The tower is crowned with a complex domed roof, clad with zinc. Large triangular pediments are formed in the gabled ends of this section of the building, and these are defined by closely space and oversized eaves brackets and feature a central segmented semi-circular opening.

Internally this front section houses offices, meeting rooms, a large stair hall and entrance hall to the auditorium. The entrance hall provides access to the auditorium and other hallways through a series of double timber doors, some with arctic glazed panels and all surmounted by operable transom windows. A bifurcating concrete stair commences on the two sides of the entrance hall and meets at a landing above the entrance door, proceeding for another flight to the first floor level. At the first floor the stair hall has a painted pressed metal ceiling. Access is provided from the stair hall on this level to the Council Chamber and a large meeting room. As this area was subject to a damaging fire, much of the interior has been refitted, in the case of these rooms with a reconstruction of what was originally built. The Council Chamber has a barrel-vaulted plaster ceiling and is lined with timber wainscotting to about 2,500 millimetres (98 in).

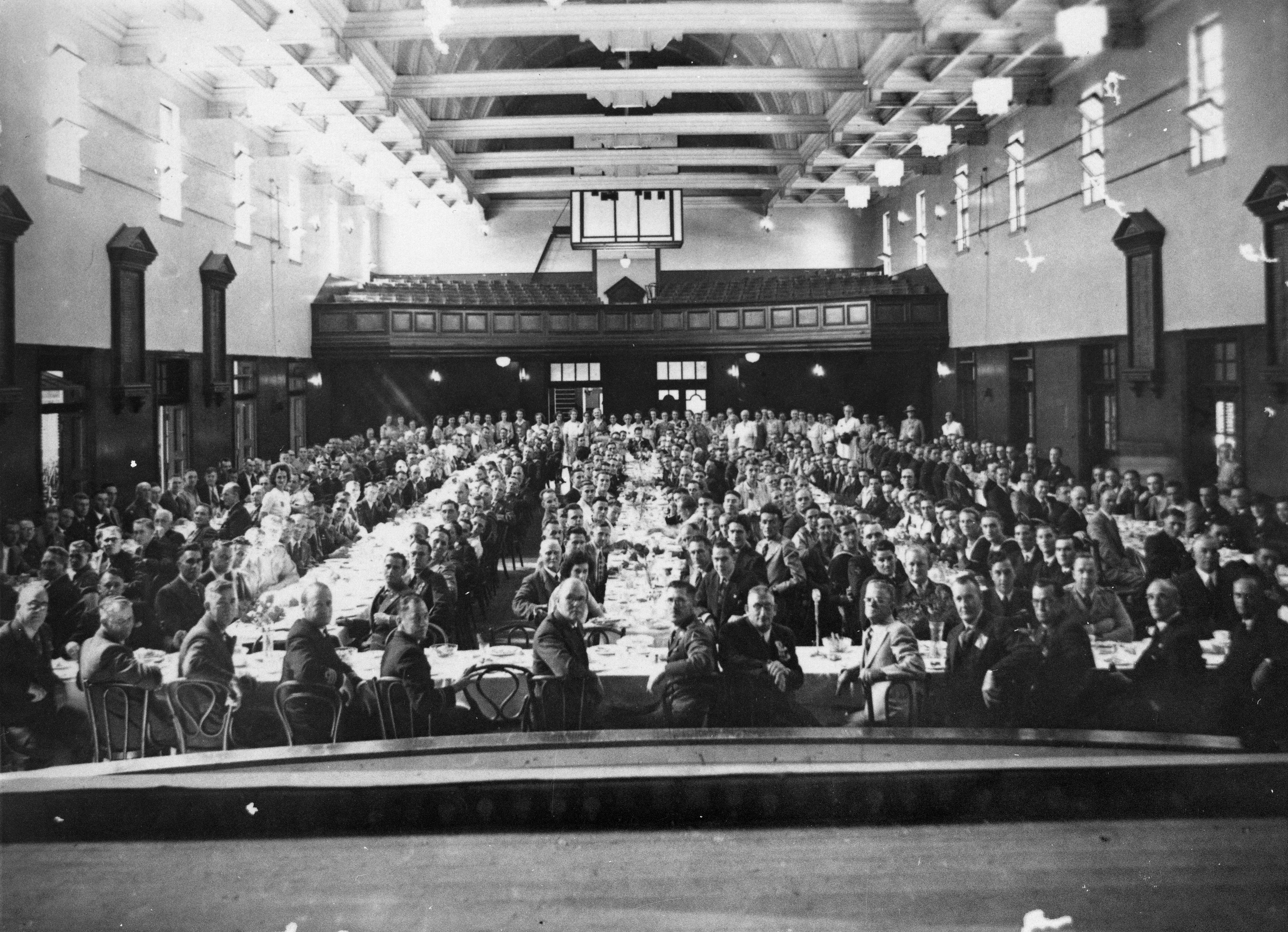
Guests seated at a function in the auditorium, circa 1939

The auditorium wing is constructed of similar brickwork, but without stuccoed banding. Externally the section is lined with a series of simple pilasters, and has square arched openings centrally placed between the pillars. Surmounting the ridge of the corrugated iron clad roof of this section is a number of simple ventilators. The interior of the auditorium has a raked timber floor toward the stage which is framed by a classically inspired proscenium archway; flanked by reeded Corinthian columns supported a gently curved entablature. The heavily coffered timber ceiling of the auditorium is barrel-vaulted centrally. A gallery at the north eastern, entrance end, has a curved floor plan and features early seating. Flanking the auditorium are semi-open verandah spaces, to which access is provided from the hall through double French doors. Attached to the wall of the auditorium, toward the stage end of the room are five Honour Boards, commemorating the citizens of Maryborough's involvement in the various wars.

To the south west of the auditorium is a large wing constructed as a fly tower behind the stage. This is a concrete structure, without openings, stuccoed with rough cast render. The surface of the section is broken by shallow pilasters, and high level semicircular openings within the shallow gables of the roof.

Attached to the northern corner of the City Hall, abutting the entrance section, is a more recent two storeyed brick and glass extension, with skillion roof, tuckpointed brickwork and a modern interior fitout.

== Heritage listing ==
Maryborough City Hall was listed on the Queensland Heritage Register on 21 October 1992 having satisfied the following criteria.

The place is important in demonstrating the evolution or pattern of Queensland's history.

The Maryborough City Hall, a large regional municipal building, demonstrates the growth of Maryborough in the early twentieth century, as the focal town of a large fertile agricultural area. This site, which was from the earliest Maryborough surveys, laid aside as public land, has historical and social importance as the long time municipal focal point of the town.

The Maryborough City Hall has associations with the early development of the Maryborough Council, with prominent citizen George Ambrose White, and with Brisbane architectural partnership, Hall and Dods.

The place is important in demonstrating the principal characteristics of a particular class of cultural places.

The City Hall is a fine example of the work of prominent Queensland architectural partnership, Hall and Dods. The building is the only built municipal example of the work of Robin Dods. The building is characteristic of a regional town hall, with classically inspired design and fine craftsmanship, symbolising the prominence, stability and progressiveness of the town.

The building uses a variety of local timbers and is a fine example of local craftsmanship with fine plasterwork and joinery throughout the building.

The place is important because of its aesthetic significance.

The building has aesthetic value as a well composed municipal structure, on a prominent site which is an integral part of the Maryborough townscape and the Kent Street streetscape.

The place has a strong or special association with a particular community or cultural group for social, cultural or spiritual reasons.

This site, which was from the earliest Maryborough surveys, laid aside as public land, has historical and social importance as the long time municipal focal point of the town.

The place has a special association with the life or work of a particular person, group or organisation of importance in Queensland's history.

The Maryborough City Hall has associations with the early development of the Maryborough Council, with prominent citizen George Ambrose White, and with Brisbane architectural partnership, Hall and Dods.
