= Lyndhurst, Clayfield =

Heritage house in Brisbane

Lyndhurst
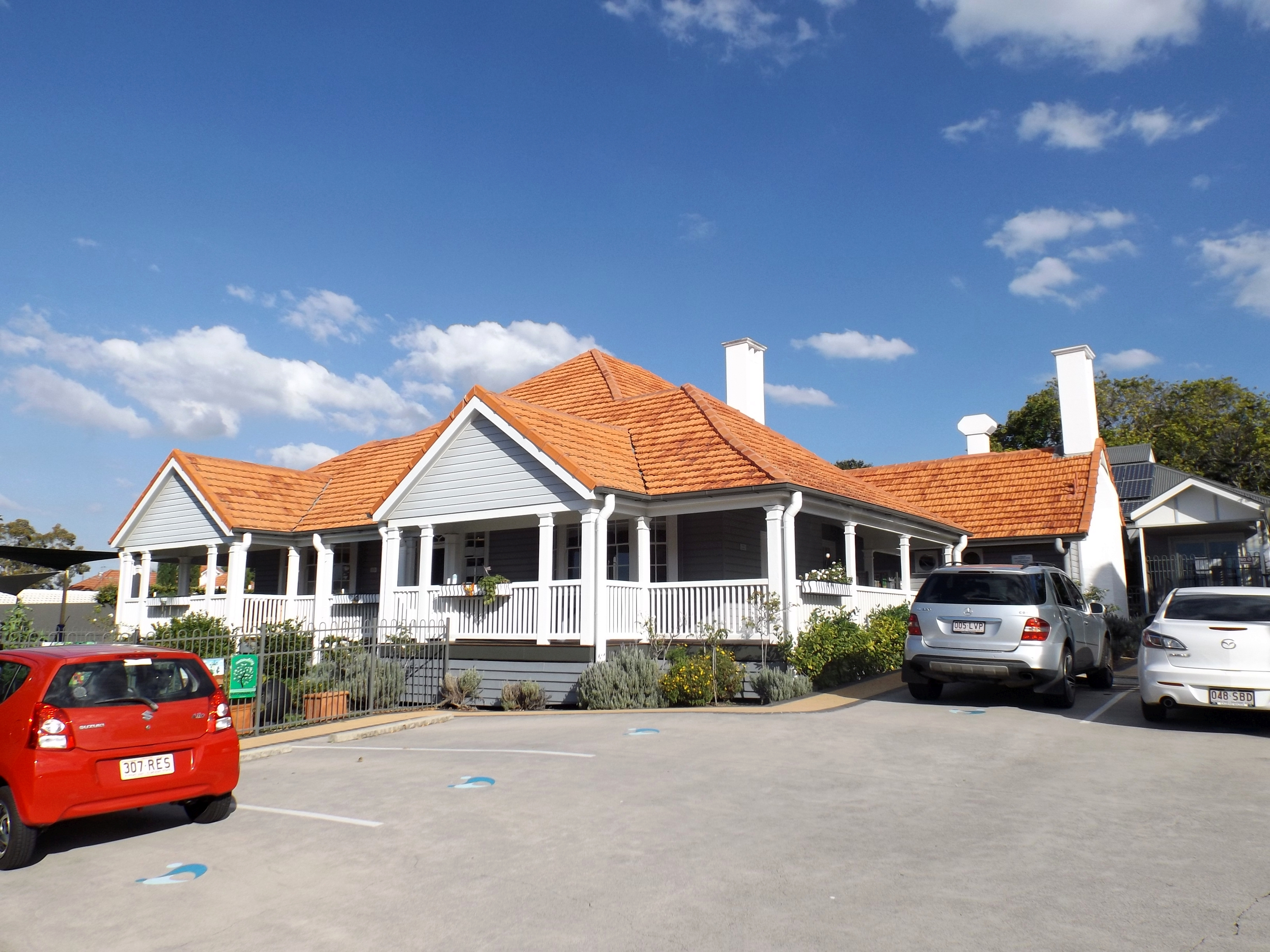
- Building in 2015

- Location within Queensland Location within Australia
- 27.4209°S 153.0538°E
- Location: 3 London Road, Clayfield, City of Brisbane, Queensland, Australia

History
- Design period: 1870s–1890s (late 19th century)
- Built: 1896–

Site notes
- Architect: Robin Dods
- Architectural style: Arts & Crafts

Queensland Heritage Register
- Official name: Lyndhurst, The Reid House
- Type: state heritage (built)
- Designated: 12 December 2003
- Reference no.: 601841
- Significant period: 1890s (fabric, historical)
- Significant components: driveway, residential accommodation – main house, service wing
- Builders: Walls & Juster

Lyndhurst is a heritage-listed villa at 3 London Road, Clayfield, City of Brisbane, Queensland, Australia. It was designed by Robin Dods and built from 1896 onwards by Walls & Juster. It is also known as The Reid House. It was added to the Queensland Heritage Register on 12 December 2003.

== History ==
Lyndhurst is a timber residence erected in 1896 for John Reid, principal of J C Hutton & Co., ham and bacon processors. It was the first substantial house designed by R S (Robin) Dods after his commencement in the Brisbane partnership of Hall and Dods from August 1896. Dods was a prolific, innovative and highly skilled architect whose work moved the Queensland timber house tradition forward. His work was influential and during his lifetime, the "Lyndhurst" design was published more often than any other of his domestic works.

In the mid 19th century the "Lyndhurst" site was included in a parcel of just under 30 acres (12 ha) alienated in 1858 by Theodore Franz of Kedron Brook. This land was subdivided in the late 1870s and again in the mid-1890s and following the second subdivision, John Reid acquired title in September 1896 to a block of 3 acres (1.2 ha) 18.8 perches (480 m^{2}) with a frontage to London Road. Reid had come to Queensland from Victoria in 1882 and established the Zillmere bacon curing works north of Brisbane for JC Hutton & Co in about 1890. This facility was then the largest of its type in Australia. Reid was also associated with the Yangan cheese factory near Warwick (established 1893) and was Chairman of Directors of the Nambour sugar mill.

Robert Smith (Robin) Dods (1868–1920) was born in New Zealand. After living in Scotland in the early 1870s, the family moved to Brisbane after his father's death. From the age of 11 he lived with his mother and stepfather, Dr C F Marks, on Wickham Terrace. In 1886, he returned to Scotland to study architecture, where he was articled with Hay and Henderson in Edinburgh. Completing his articles, Dods moved to London in 1890, where he worked for a number of architects, including the prestigious firm of Aston Webb and Ingress Bell. Dods' training in London placed him amongst the third generation of Arts and Crafts-based architects, contemporary with Edwin Lutyens, Charles Rennie Mackintosh and Frank Lloyd Wright. Central to his philosophy was a belief in developing a new architecture based on regional tradition, clearly expressed in his subsequent domestic work in Brisbane.

In 1894 he returned to Brisbane for a year's visit, during which time he and architect Francis Hall submitted a successful competition entry for the nurses' home at the Brisbane Hospital. He returned to London, but came back to Brisbane in August 1896 to set up in partnership as Hall and Dods. Within the partnership, Dods was responsible for most of the design, while Hall concentrated on management. The practice was the most influential source of modern design in Brisbane, producing a wide range of accomplished buildings and was credited with achieving an "architectural revolution in Brisbane." Dods was able to integrate contemporary British design philosophies with the traditions of Queensland housing and the requirements of a subtropical climate, producing practical and attractive houses that were finely detailed and widely copied. The partnership was sustained until 1913, when Dods left to practice in Sydney. Soon after his move to Sydney World War I virtually stopped all building and Dods died prematurely in 1920.

John Reid commissioned Hall and Dods to design his Clayfield residence soon after the partnership was formed in August 1896, following earlier commissions with John Hall and Son to design Hutton's Zillmere works and the Yangan cheese factory. Lyndhurst was Dods' seventh domestic commission in Brisbane. Tenders were called on 5 September 1896 and the contract was let to Walls and Huster with a tender price of £1,007.

When completed, the Reid house faced northeast and was set well back from London Road with a gravel drive on the western side terminating in front of the house and sloping down to the road. Although it was unusual in Brisbane to do so, Dods also designed the front garden of the house. It was set out in three formal terraces and had garden stairs that led across a formal parterre to the lawn tennis court beyond. Hedges with topiary features were planted around the perimeter. Queen palms were planted either side of the entrance and weeping fig trees to the east side and rear. This garden was lost when the property was subdivided in 1945.

The timber-framed house, although derived from Queensland tradition, incorporated some important differences in planning, details and materials. The design was plain and the decoration, although sparingly used, was classically derived. An extreme roof pitch ensured that the roof was dominant, and the roof geometry was symmetrically arranged around a central axis. It was clad with terracotta Marseilles roofing tiles - an early use of this material in Queensland. However, the "symmetry" of the house was only implied, for in plan the central corridor was moved to one side to favour rooms with wider verandahs on the western side. The front verandah broke forward as a porch with a pedimented gable, giving protection to the stair. The pediment itself was cranked along the sides, reflecting a subtle change in pitch as the steep roof flattened out slightly over the verandahs. The verandah had turned balusters and 8 in × 3 in (203 mm × 76 mm) timber verandah posts with the wide face to the outside, subtle but unusual embellishments in Queensland. The design of the front stair was similarly unconventional, with an awning supported on verandah posts, and narrow projecting verandah elements flanking the stair, all of which were covered. The house had two tall rendered chimneys with concrete caps.

The whole house was raised on wooden stumps in the traditional Queensland fashion, but instead of a vertical batten skirt around the perimeter, the base was sheeted with hardwood weatherboards, relieved only by small vertical slits, with a gap for the ant caps just below floor bearer level. The effect was of a solid house firmly tied to the ground. Solidity was to become an identifying characteristic of all Dods' buildings. The house design was published in the premier London architectural journal The Builder in 1906 and in Domestic Architecture in Australia by W Hardy Wilson in 1919.

The external sheeting of the front wall was of pine chamferboards, in conventional fashion, but the wall itself was unconventionally blank. With the exception of corner bay windows and the front door and sidelights, there were no other openings in the front elevation. At a subsequent date the corner bays were moved to the front, the central pediment porch was removed and two gables were constructed over the relocated bay windows.

Internally, the walls were sheeted with innovative narrow, vertically jointed pine boards and the ceilings with pressed metal of Art Nouveau design.

The service wing at the rear projected to the west at right angles to the main house, and contained kitchen, two pantries and a ground level washhouse. It had a blank wall to the street, relieved only by two oval-shaped windows to the kitchen itself, but opening onto a latticed verandah at the rear.

Lyndhurst remained the Reid family home for nearly 25 years. Following John Reid's death in January 1919 his widow sold the property and in January 1921 the house, on a slightly reduced site, was transferred to David Rhoades of Brisbane, then a month later to Letitia Macdonald. Queensland Post Office Directories list William A Macdonald as a resident from 1921 to 22 until at least 1940, although a Mrs Buss is thought to have lived at Lyndhurst in the 1930s. A detached extension at the rear of the house was extant by 1929.

Following Mrs MacDonald's death in 1942, the house was transferred in 1945 to Richard and Gladys Lucas. They subdivided the property, separating the front garden and tennis court from the house and driveway (still off London Road). Lyndhurst was sold c. 1946 and title changed hands frequently from this period until acquired by Aitkin Investments in 1983. It is likely that the house and extension were converted to flats in the late 1940s or early 1950s, resulting in a number of alterations, including enclosing of the verandahs, cladding of the exterior walls with stucco coated fibrous cement, some additional interior partitioning and extensions to the rear addition. Turrawan Private Hospital (1930s) is on adjoining land and was sold to Uniting Healthcare in 1998. "Lyndhurst" may have become part of the property at that time. It was subsequently sold to the Presbyterian and Methodist Schools Association to be incorporated into Clayfield College, where it was redeveloped into an early childhood learning centre (opened 2008).

== Description ==
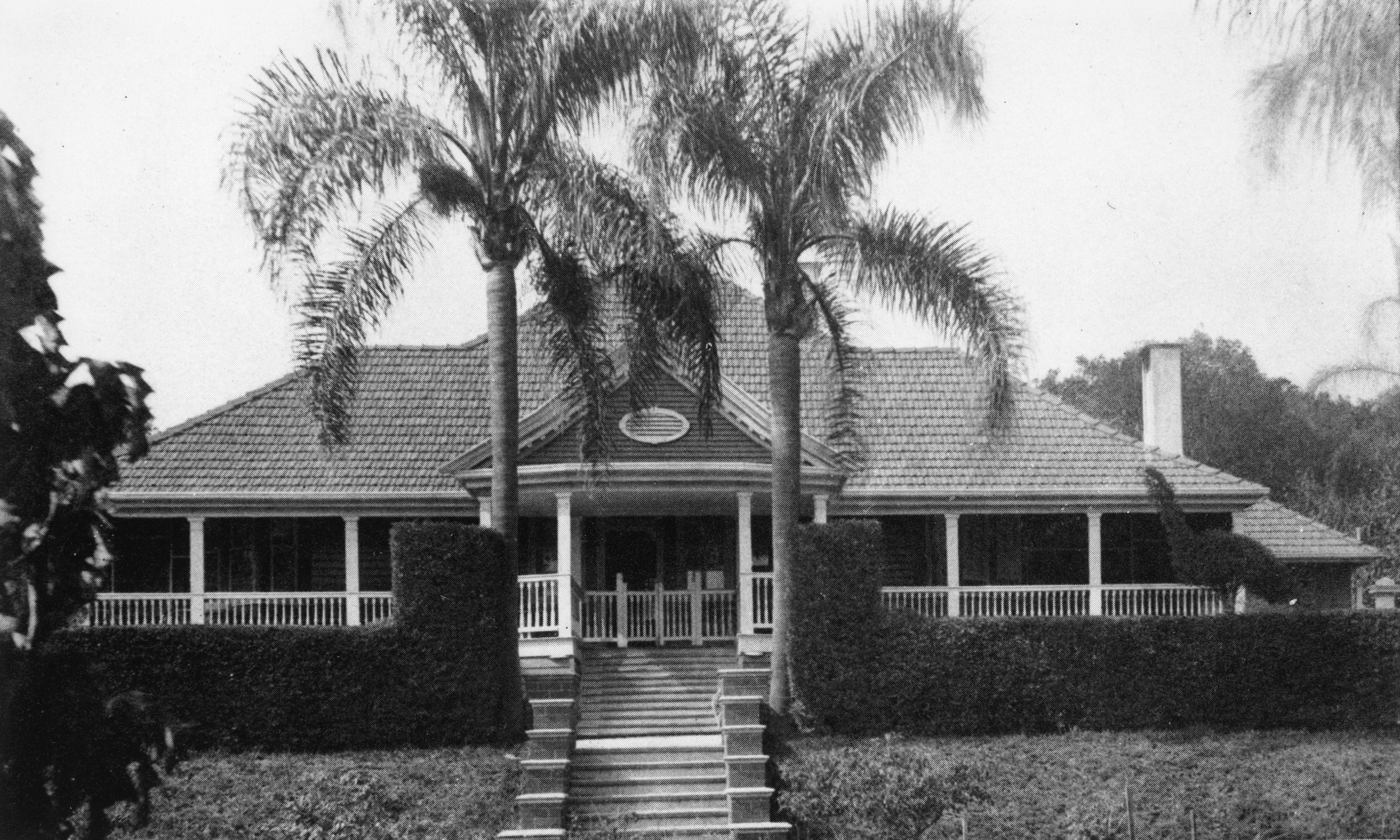
Lyndhurst during Mrs Reid's occupancy

'Lyndhurst' is not visible from the street and is located on a sloping site set well back from London Road. It is reached via a long concrete drive in the same location as the original gravel driveway.

The large, single-storey house has a timber frame elevated on timber stumps at the front and set close to the ground at the rear. The area beneath the house is enclosed with concrete blocks that have been rendered to match the exterior fibrous cement sheeting. A pair of narrow concrete stairs leads up to the two doors at the front of the house.

The roof is steeply pitched and composed of two large hips that are symmetrically arranged around a central axis through the front elevation and are clad in terracotta Marseilles pattern tiles. Twin gables, of a uniform roof pitch, project from the building's front elevation. The pediments of the gables are clad with fibrous cement sheeting and are decorated with wide timber battens. Two tall rendered chimneys with concrete caps are the only other visible elements on the vast roof. Part of the verandah roof on the eastern side of the house has been replaced with corrugated iron.

The existing external walls of the house are clad with fibrous cement sheeting fitted to a timber frame that incorporates the original verandah posts. The original external walls, which are presently part of the buildings' interior, are also clad with fibrous cement sheeting that may possibly be covering the original chamferboard. Where the verandah has been enclosed, a variety of windows have been installed.

Although alterations have been made, the original plan of the house can still be read and the form of most rooms remains substantially intact despite the introduction or alteration of door and window openings. Internally, most of the original rooms are lined in narrow vertically jointed pine boards, though some are clad in fibrous cement sheeting. The former drawing and dining rooms have picture rail and dado mouldings. In part of the former kitchen wing, narrow lining boards have only been used on one side of the wall, leaving the timber frame exposed. The ceilings in the former drawing and dining rooms are pressed metal, exhibiting rich designs together with a perimeter border. The ceilings to most of the other original rooms are also pressed metal, though simpler in design. The former timber lined soffits to the original verandah remain despite the enclosure of the verandah and the introduction of kitchen and bathroom facilities for the various flats. The former kitchen wing has painted pine ceiling boards. Timber floorboards exist throughout the house, which contains three open fireplaces, of which only those in the former dining and morning rooms have chimneypieces. The two simply moulded timber surrounds, which are presently painted, are similar in design although that in the dining room is larger.

Most of the original doors, many of which were French doors, have been removed with their hinges leaving open doorways. The original interior doors are of panelled timber with pressed metal push plates. Evidence of the original dark stained finish is evident under layers of paint. The bay windows are substantially intact despite having been relocated from the corner of both front rooms. A decorative internal timber fretwork grille is fitted to both of them.

A large two storeyed addition, which is not considered significant, has been constructed at the rear of the original house.

== Heritage listing ==
Lyndhurst was listed on the Queensland Heritage Register on 12 December 2003 having satisfied the following criteria.

The place is important in demonstrating the evolution or pattern of Queensland's history.

'Lyndhurst' is important in terms of Queensland's architectural history and in the development of the Queensland house. It is believed to be the earliest substantial residence designed by the influential partnership of Hall & Dods in 1896. Robert (Robin) Smith Dods is noted for the introduction of ideas on architectural design that were then current in the United Kingdom and integrating them with traditional Queensland forms and materials. His designs subsequently influenced Australian architecture. "Lyndhurst" is situated in an area where many fine homes, including others by Dods, were subsequently built and illustrates the development of Clayfield as a prestigious residential area.

The place demonstrates rare, uncommon or endangered aspects of Queensland's cultural heritage.

'Lyndhurst' is rare as an early example of Dods domestic work. Although he designed many houses, few, particularly of the size and quality of "Lyndhurst", survive.

The place is important in demonstrating the principal characteristics of a particular class of cultural places.

As a residence designed shortly after his return from the United Kingdom, it is of particular interest in understanding the development of domestic design in Brisbane. Although it has sustained major alterations, it retains much of the original layout and characteristic features of his work.

The place is important in demonstrating a high degree of creative or technical achievement at a particular period.

'Lyndhurst' is important for its association with the life and work of RS (Robin) Dods, an innovative and influential architect who made a major contribution to the development of housing design in Queensland. It is an early and influential example of his work, adapting Arts and Crafts design philosophy with the climatic constraints posed by sub tropical dwelling.

The place has a special association with the life or work of a particular person, group or organisation of importance in Queensland's history.

'Lyndhurst' is important for its association with the life and work of RS (Robin) Dods, an innovative and influential architect who made a major contribution to the development of housing design in Queensland.
