= Turrawan =

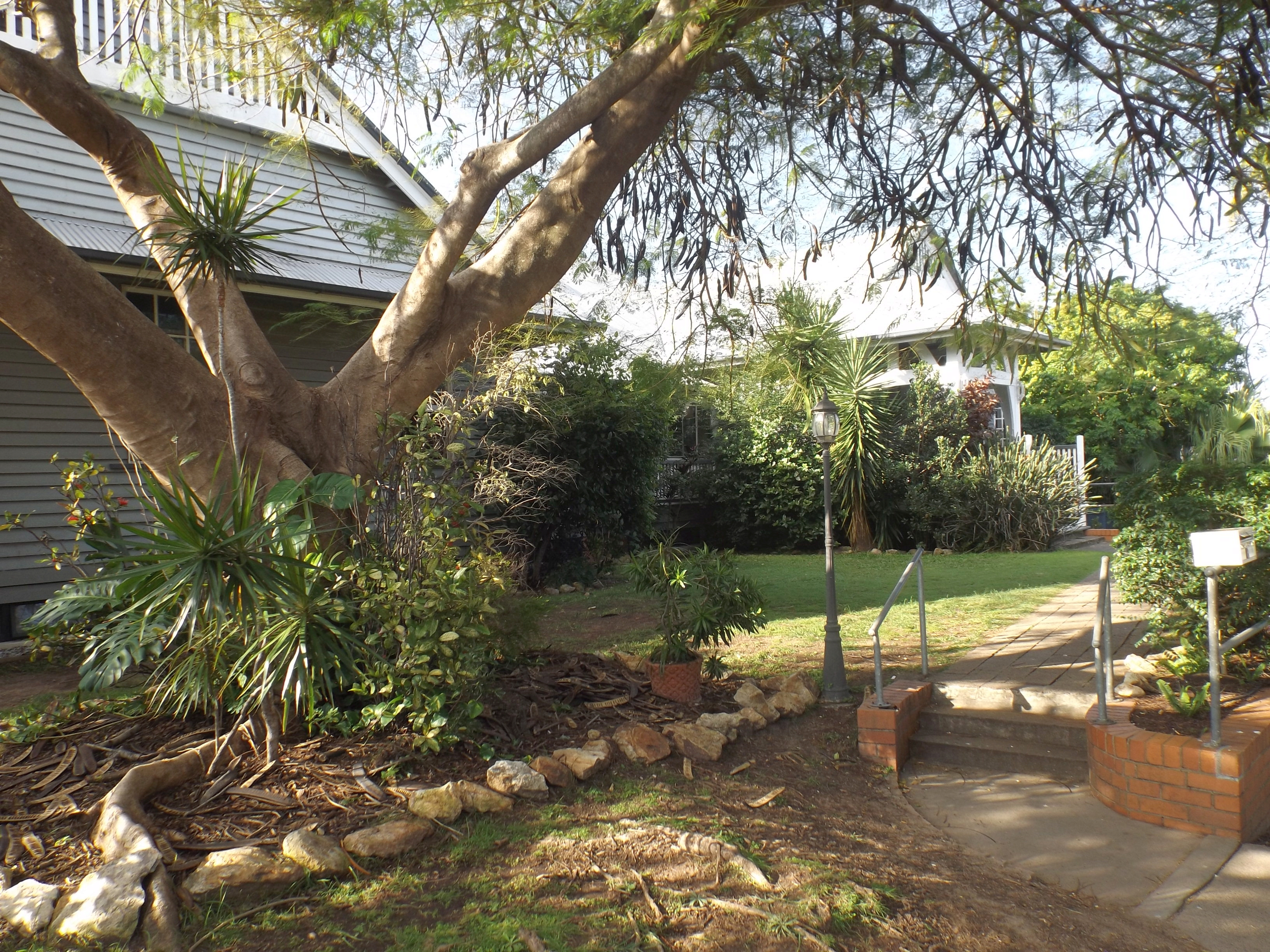
- Front of the building in 2015

- Location within Queensland Location within Australia
- 27.4201°S 153.0544°E
- Location: 8 London Road, Clayfield, Brisbane, Queensland, Australia

History
- Design period: 1900–1914 (early 20th century)
- Built: 1906–

Site notes
- Architect: Robin Dods
- Architectural style: Arts & Crafts

Queensland Heritage Register
- Official name: Clayfield House, Turrawan, Turrawan Private Hospital
- Type: state heritage (built)
- Designated: 24 September 2004
- Reference no.: 602452
- Significant period: 1906 (fabric, historical)
- Significant components: steps/stairway, wall/s, garden/grounds, residential accommodation – main house

Turrawan is a heritage-listed detached house at 8 London Road, Clayfield, Brisbane, Queensland, Australia. It was designed by Robin Dods and built from 1906 onwards. It is also known as Turrawan Private Hospital and Clayfield House. It was added to the Queensland Heritage Register on 24 September 2004.

== History ==
Turrawan was constructed in 1906 to a design by Robin Dods as a combined residence and surgery for Dr Arthur Charles Frederick Halford.

Robert Smith (Robin) Dods (1868–1920) was born in New Zealand. After living in Scotland in the early 1870s, the family moved to Brisbane after his father's death. From the age of 11 he lived with his mother and stepfather, Dr Charles Ferdinand Marks, on Wickham Terrace. In 1886, he returned to Scotland to study architecture, where he was articled with Hay and Henderson in Edinburgh. Completing his articles, Dods moved to London in 1890, where he worked for a number of architects, including the prestigious firm of Aston Webb and Ingress Bell. Dods' training in London placed him amongst the third generation of Arts and Crafts-based architects, contemporary with Edwin Lutyens, Charles Rennie Mackintosh and Frank Lloyd Wright. Central to his philosophy was a belief in developing a new architecture based on regional tradition, clearly expressed in his subsequent domestic work in Brisbane.

In 1894 he returned to Brisbane for a year's visit, during which time he and architect Francis Hall submitted a successful competition entry for the nurses' home at the Brisbane Hospital. He returned to London, but came back to Brisbane in August 1896 to set up in partnership as Hall and Dods. Within the partnership, Dods was responsible for most of the design, while Hall concentrated on management. The practice was the most influential source of modern design in Brisbane, producing a wide range of accomplished buildings and was credited with achieving an "architectural revolution in Brisbane." Dods was able to integrate contemporary British design philosophies with the traditions of Queensland housing and the requirements of a subtropical climate, producing practical and attractive houses that were finely detailed and widely copied. The partnership was sustained until 1913, when Dods left to practice in Sydney. Soon after his move to Sydney World War I virtually stopped all building and Dods died prematurely in 1920.

In 1905 Arthur Charles Frederick Halford, a doctor, purchased just under an acre of land comprising re-subdivisions 1–4 and 98–101 of subdivision 3 of portion 79 at the corner of Sandgate Road and London Road. Tenders were let for the construction of a house for him, to the design of Robin Dods, in August 1905. The builder is thought to have been Hall and Mayer and the house cost £1382.92 to complete. Comprising a residence and surgery, the building originally faced Sandgate Road, with the entrance to the residential section accessed from this road and the surgery accessed from London Road. Tennis courts were constructed behind the house. It was at the time the only building between Wagner and London Roads.

It was not uncommon in the late 19th and early 20th centuries for doctors to have a surgery in their home. A number of small private hospitals were also run from houses, particularly for maternity cases. An Arthur Halford is registered as an obstetrician in this period. Other houses in the area were used as residence/surgeries at different times. It was a form that Dods was familiar with as his stepfather and brother were doctors and Dods designed a surgery/residence for his brother on Wickham Terrace (now known as Ritas at Dods House Restaurant).

In 1906, Dr Halford was living at "Turrawan", though by 1915 he was also practicing from 157 Wickham Terrace. In 1910 a trust was set up for the property with trustees Arthur Halford and Union Trustees. In 1923 the trustees for the property became Arthur Halford, his wife Nora and daughter Nora Millar. In 1922 the 1,500 seat Savoy Picture Theatre was constructed next to the house on Sandgate Road.

Dr Halford is thought to have lived and worked from "Turrawan" until 1920, when a lease was let to Alexander Murray for five years. In 1926 the Post Office Directory lists a Dr Neville Sutton as the occupant, using London Road as his preferred address.

Mrs Halford died in 1932 and in 1935 resubs 98, 99 and 100 in London Road were sold and houses were built on them. Part of this land appears to have included a portion of the "Turrawan" tennis court. At an unknown date "Turrawan" was rotated on the site to face London Road and now also occupies a part of the former site of its tennis court.

Nora Millar Halford married Harold Love in 1936 and in 1945 Dr Halford died. In the following year, the property was transferred to Savoy Pictures Pty Limited.

In 1960 the property was resurveyed and subdivided into two blocks and an easement. The realignment of the boundary between lots one and two suggests that the house was already in its current position at that time. In 1961, BP Australia purchased Lot 1, the block on the corner of Clayfield and London Roads and constructed a service station on it. This closed down in the early 1980s and a garden nursery now occupies its site.

In 1984 Lot 2 was sold to Rodney and Colleen Abbott and was a boarding house when purchased by the current owner in 1988. Since then it has operated under the name "Clayfield House", providing supported accommodation.

A small addition containing a bathroom has made to the rear of the house and some internal walls have been removed or altered. Although the chimneys are no longer present, presumably having been lost when the house was rotated, a tiered corner fireplace remains in the former dining room.

== Description ==
Turrawan is located on a sloping block, supported by high concrete stumps at the eastern end and a brick retaining wall to London Road. It is a single storey building constructed of timber with a typical Dods steeply pitched hipped roof clad with corrugated iron sheeting.

It has two projecting bays facing London Road; the eastern bay contains the main, and former private, entrance. This is accessed by a shallow set of stairs approaching a porch constructed of substantial timber beams in the Arts and Crafts style. The phrase EAST WEST ?? HAME'S BEST is carved into the beam across the entrance.

The remainder of the front elevation comprises a central verandah, which is now enclosed with the balustrades intact and sheeted over, and a protruding bay on the western end. The eastern elevation also comprises an enclosed verandah with intact balustrades and the location of the separate surgery access is evident, although the stairs to this have been removed. Verandah detailing consists of simple and elegant timber brackets and balustrades typical of Dod's style.

The interior is lined with vertical tongue and groove boards and has timber floors and ceilings. The joinery is well detailed and includes such features as cupboards, multiple paned double-hung and French windows, a bay window and a walk through sash window opening on to the verandah.

Although a few internal walls have been removed and some added, and rooms have been built into the verandah, the general form of the house has altered little. The original plan, separating residential and medical areas, can still be read and most rooms remain substantially intact.

== Heritage listing ==
Turrawan was listed on the Queensland Heritage Register on 24 September 2004 having satisfied the following criteria.

The place is important in demonstrating the evolution or pattern of Queensland's history.

Turrawan is important in terms of Queensland's architectural history and in the development of the Queensland house. It was designed by the influential partnership of Hall & Dods in 1906.

The place demonstrates rare, uncommon or endangered aspects of Queensland's cultural heritage.

Turrawan is uncommon as an early example of a purpose designed doctor's surgery and residence and also as an example of Dods domestic work. Although he designed many houses, few, particularly of the size and quality of Turrawan, survive. Although some alterations have been made to the house, it retains much of the original layout and detail illustrating characteristics of his work.

The place is important in demonstrating the principal characteristics of a particular class of cultural places.

Turrawan is situated in an area where many fine homes, including others by Dods, were built and illustrates the development of Clayfield as a prestigious residential area. Turrawan, as a purpose designed surgery/residence, then private hospital illustrates the development of medical practice in Brisbane. Turrawan demonstrates the principal features of a doctor's residence and surgery with separate entrances and a room layout that separates the practice rooms from the residential areas of the building.

The place is important because of its aesthetic significance.

It has aesthetic significance as a substantial and well-designed dwelling and is important for its association with the life and work of RS (Robin) Dods, an innovative and influential architect who made a major contribution to the development of housing design in Queensland.

The place has a special association with the life or work of a particular person, group or organisation of importance in Queensland's history.

Robert Smith (Robin) Dods is noted for the introduction of ideas on architectural design then current in the United Kingdom and integrating them with traditional Queensland forms and materials. His designs subsequently influenced Australian architecture.
