= Francis Richard Hall =

Australian architect

Francis Richard Hall (9 February 1862 – 18 March 1939) was an architect in Brisbane, Queensland, Australia. Many of his works are listed on the Queensland Heritage Register.

== Early life ==
Francis Hall was born on 9 February 1862 in Brisbane, the son of architect John Richard Hall and his wife Philadelphia (née Starr). He attended school in Brisbane and Maryborough before winning a scholarship in 1875 to attend Brisbane Grammar School. His half-brother, Thomas Ramsay Hall also trained as an architect.

== Career ==
He commenced his architectural career in 1896 when he joined his father's practice which was then renamed Hall & Son. After his father's death in 1883, he became head of the practice. From 1896 to 1913, he worked in partnership with Robert Smith (Robin) Dods as Hall & Dods. From 1923 to 1927, he was in partnership with Alan Devereux as Hall & Devereux. From about 1928, he was in a partnership with Harold Morton Cook as Hall & Cook.

== Later life ==
A long-time enthusiast of horse racing, Francis Hall died suddenly in the main grandstand of the Eagle Farm racecourse during the running of the Welter Handicap on the afternoon of Saturday 18 March 1939. His firm Hall & Cook were the architects for the Queensland Turf Club. On Monday 20 March 1939, his funeral left his home "Kamalroi", 29 Old Sandgate Road, Albion for the Toowong Cemetery where he was privately interred.

In addition to his interest in horse racing, Hall was also an expert photographer with a large collection of photos of early Brisbane. He was also a keen botanist and trustee of the Queensland Acclimatisation Society.

== Personal life ==
Hall married Anna Tranberg in Brisbane in 1884. He was survived by his wife and two children. His grandson, named for him also pursued architecture as a career.

== Works ==
as Hall & Son

- South Brisbane Municipal Chambers

as Hall & Dods

- Mater Misericordiae Hospital
- St Brigid's Church, Red Hill
- Australian Mutual Provident Society
- Maryborough City Hall

The State Library of Queensland holds a large collection of architectural drawings and plans of Francis Hall and the various partnerships he was involved in.
