= Hall & Dods =

Hall & Dods was an architectural partnership in Brisbane, Queensland, Australia. The partners were Francis Richard Hall and Robin Dods and the partnership lasted from 1896 to 1913.

== Works ==
Works of the partnership include:

- Australian Mercantile Land & Finance Woolstores (1912)
- Mount Carmel Convent (1915)
