= Sunshine Coast, Queensland =

Sunshine Coast
- Region
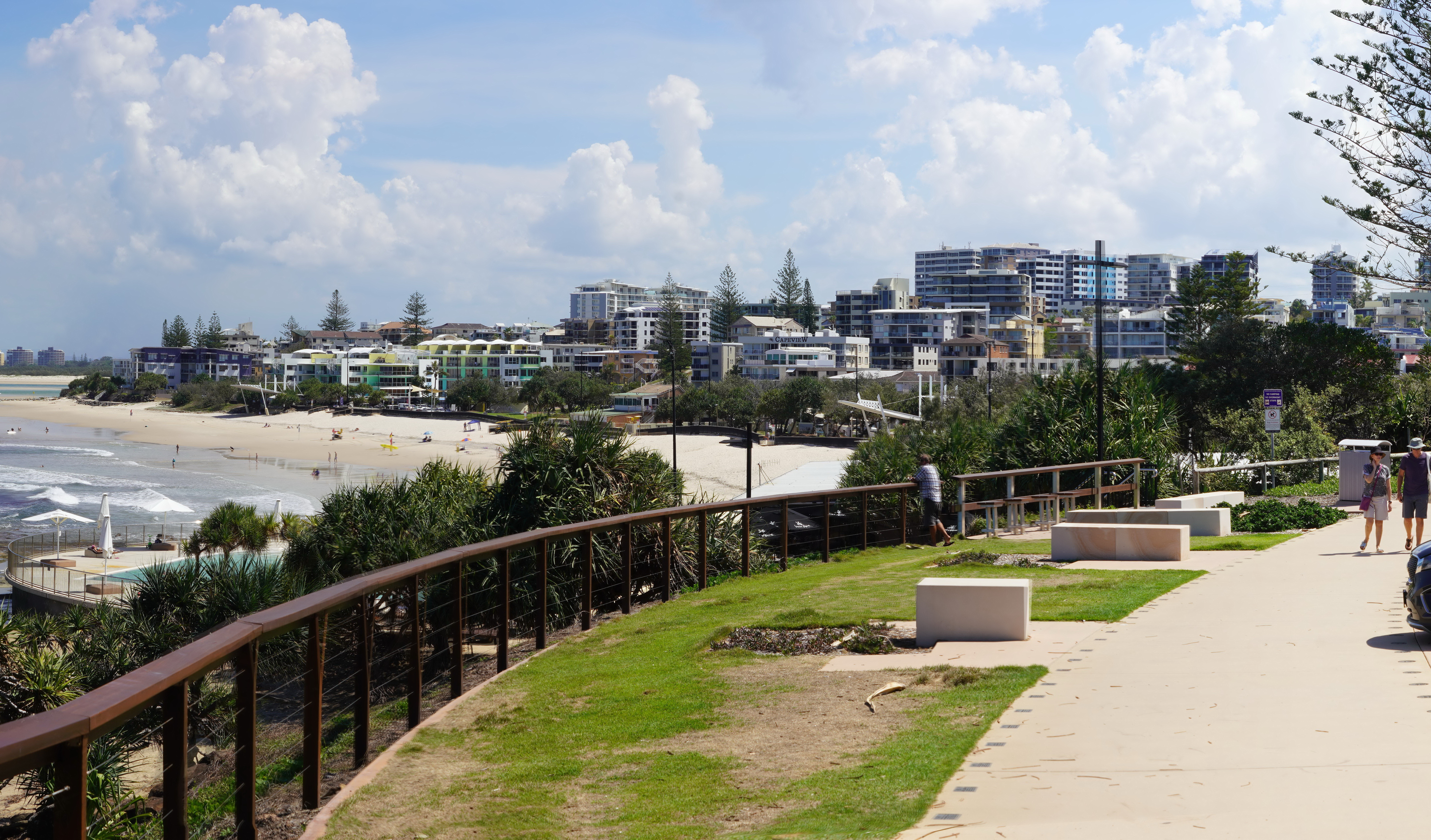
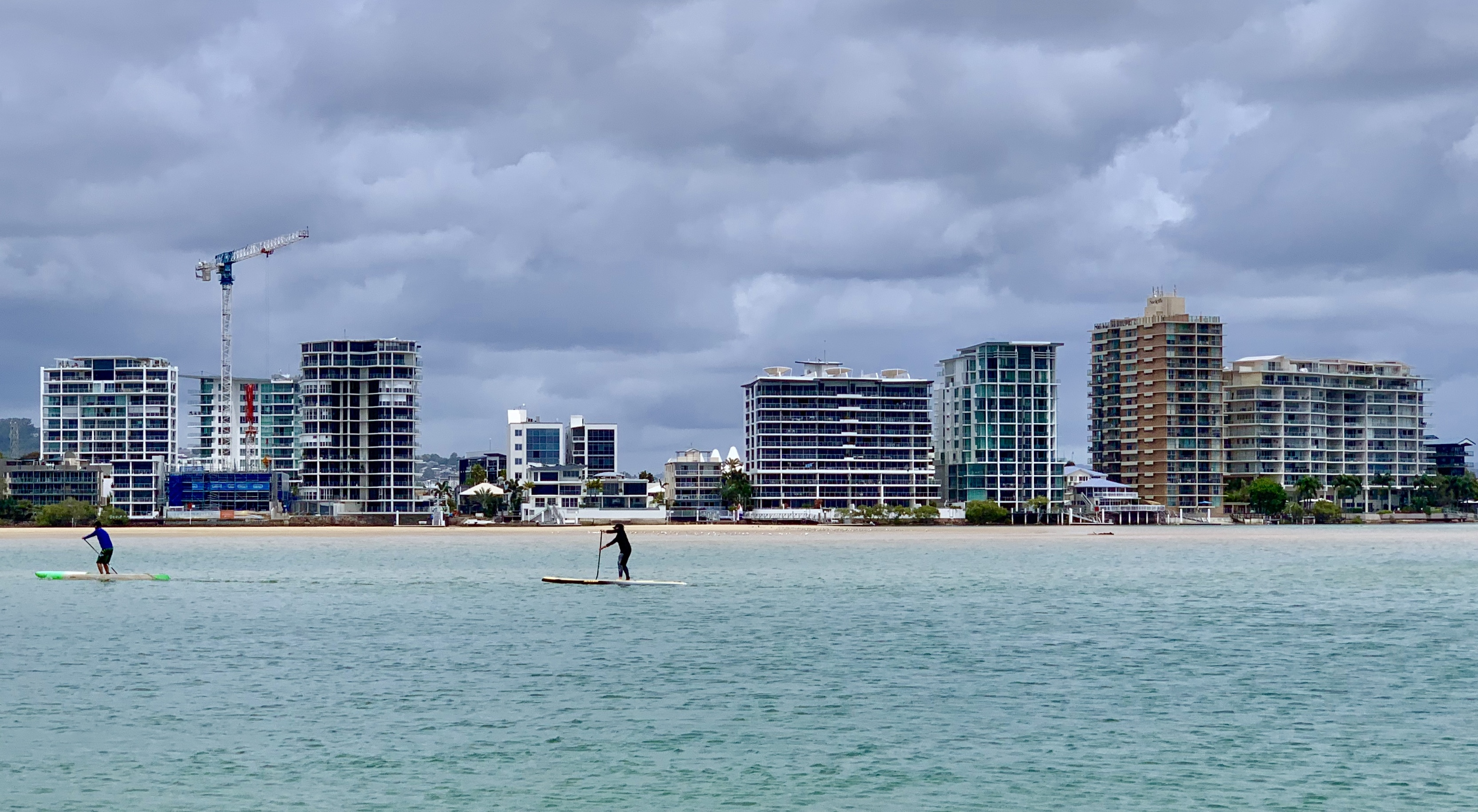
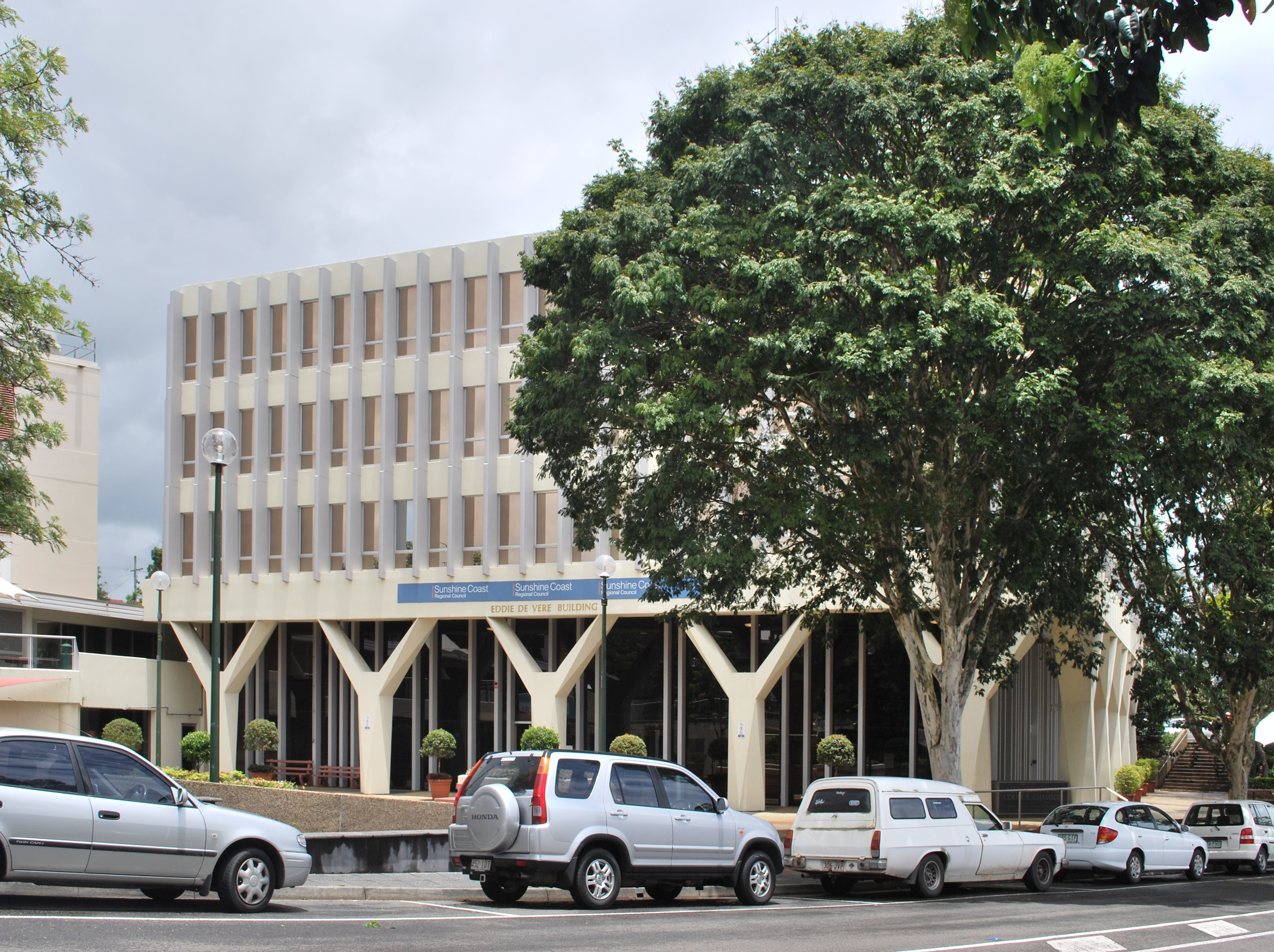
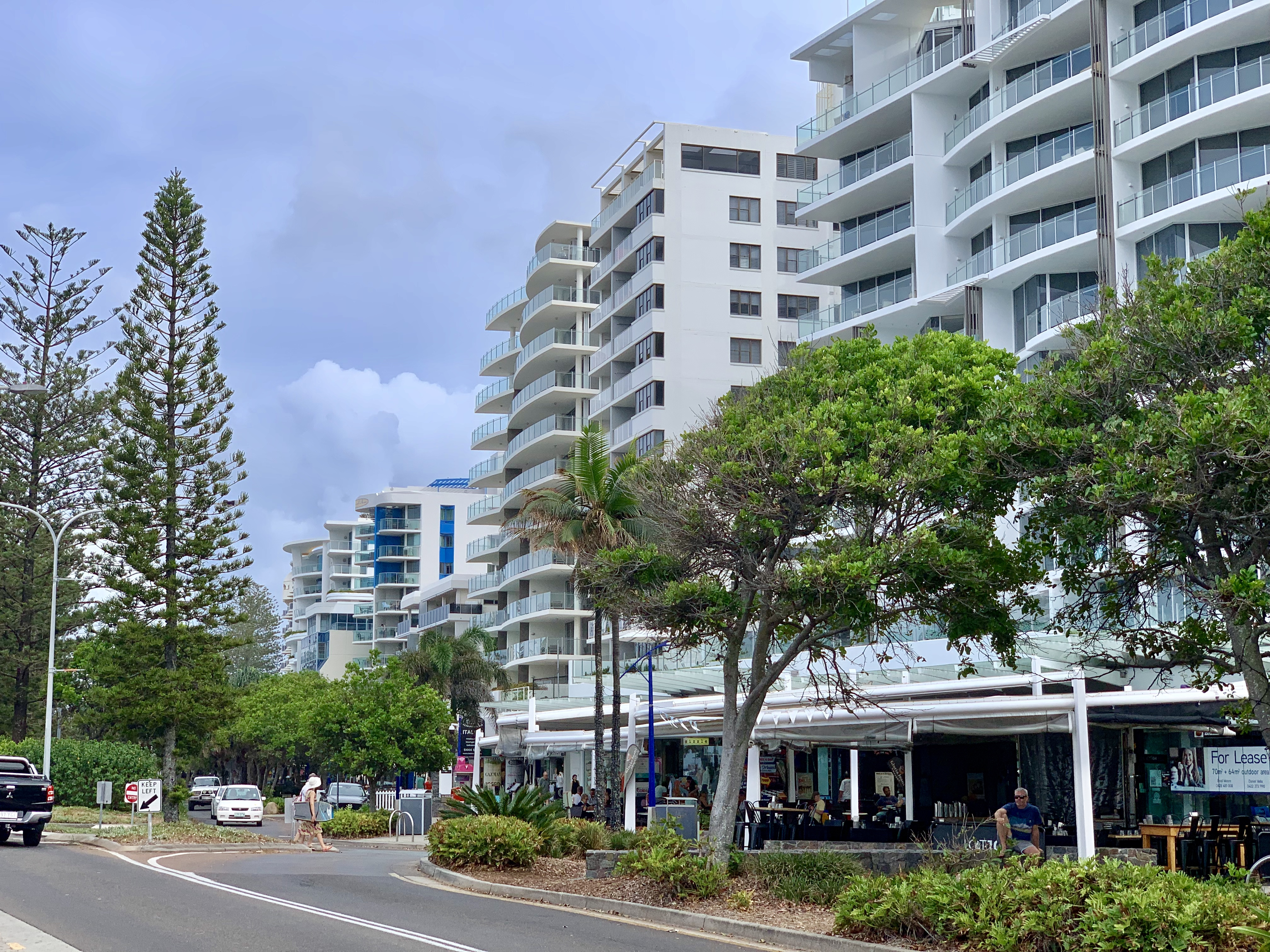
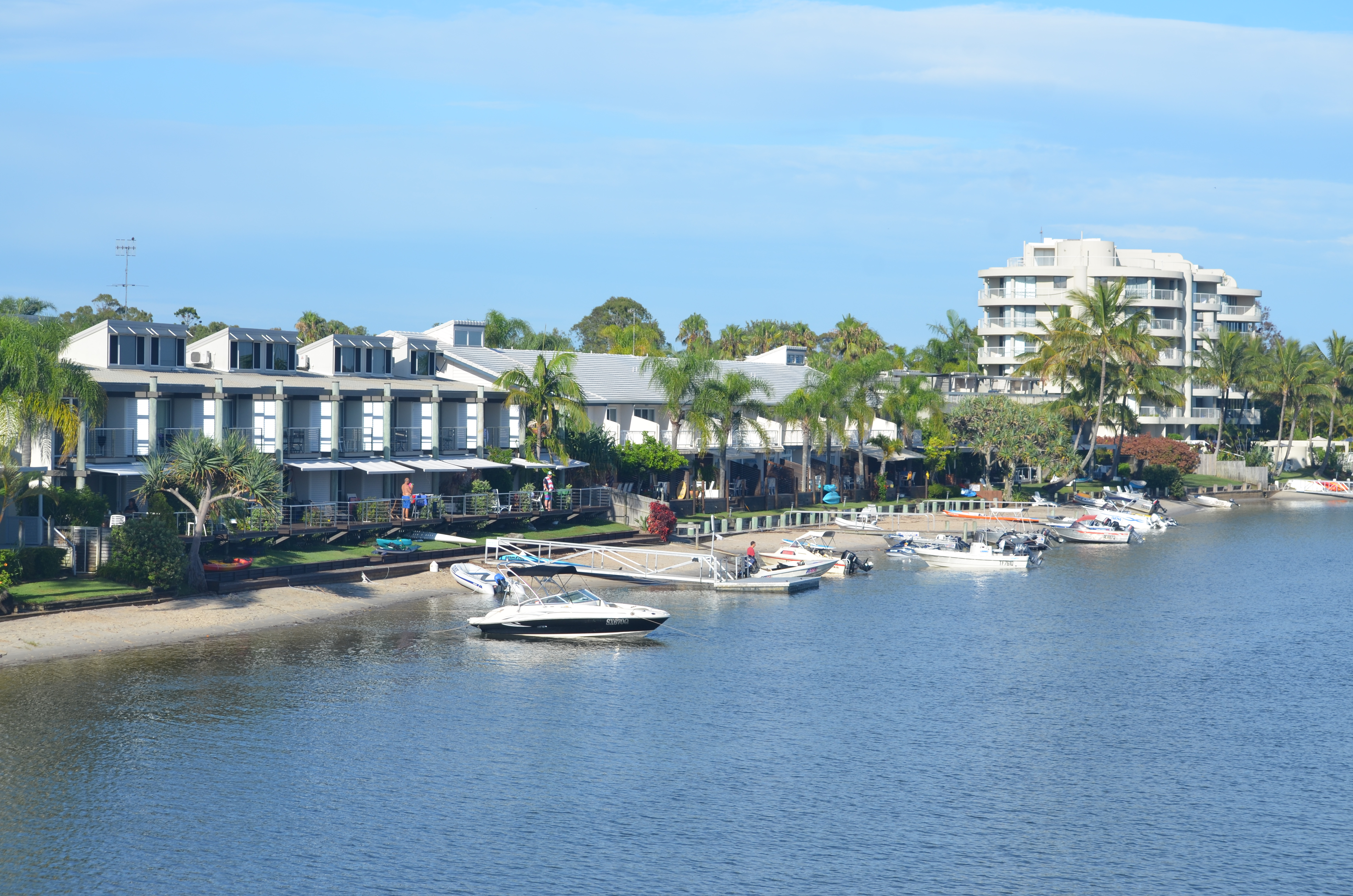
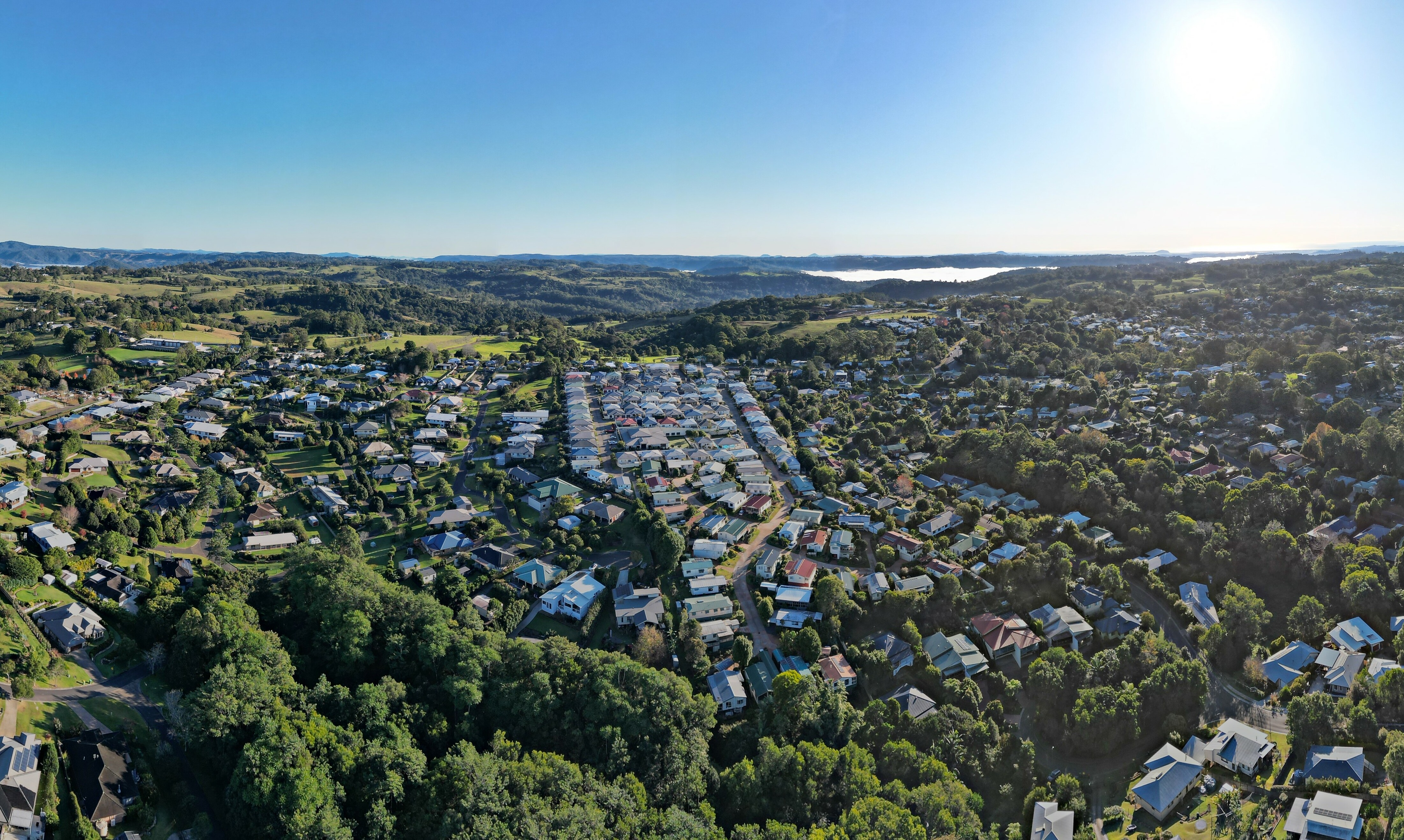
- Caloundra Maroochydore Nambour Mooloolaba Noosa Heads Maleny

- Interactive map of Sunshine Coast
- Coordinates: 26°39′15″S 153°05′36″E
- Country: Australia
- State: Queensland
- LGAs: Sunshine Coast Region; Shire of Noosa
- Location: 100 km (62 mi) from Brisbane

Government
  - State electorate: Buderim, Caloundra, Glass House, Kawana, Maroochydore, Nicklin, Noosa
  - Federal divisions: Fairfax; Fisher; Wide Bay

Area (2016 urban)
  - Total: 1,633 km^{2} (631 sq mi)

Population
  - Total: 398,840 (2021) (9th)
  - Density: 244.24/km^{2} (632.57/sq mi)
- Mean max temp: 25.4 °C (77.7 °F)
- Mean min temp: 15.8 °C (60.4 °F)
- Annual rainfall: 1,478.5 mm (58.21 in)

The Sunshine Coast is a peri-urban region in South East Queensland, Australia. In 1967, it was defined as "the area contained in the [former] Shires of Landsborough, Maroochy and Noosa, but excluding Bribie Island". Located 100 km (62 mi) north of the centre of Brisbane in South East Queensland, on the Coral Sea coastline, its urban area spans approximately 60 km (37 mi) of coastline and hinterland from Pelican Waters to Tewantin.

The area has several coastal hubs at Caloundra, Kawana Waters, Maroochydore and Noosa Heads. Nambour and Maleny have developed as primary commercial centres for the hinterland.

Since 2014, the Sunshine Coast district has been split into two local government areas, the Sunshine Coast Region and the Shire of Noosa, which administer the southern and northern parts of the Sunshine Coast respectively.

As of June 2021, with an estimated urban population of 398,840, the Sunshine Coast (without inclusion of Moreton Bay or Logan City; a part of Brisbane's population) is the third (5th) most populated area in Queensland and the 9th most populous in the country. The population of the area has grown steadily at an average annual rate of 2.4% year-on-year over the five years to 2018.

== History ==
=== Pre-colonial ===
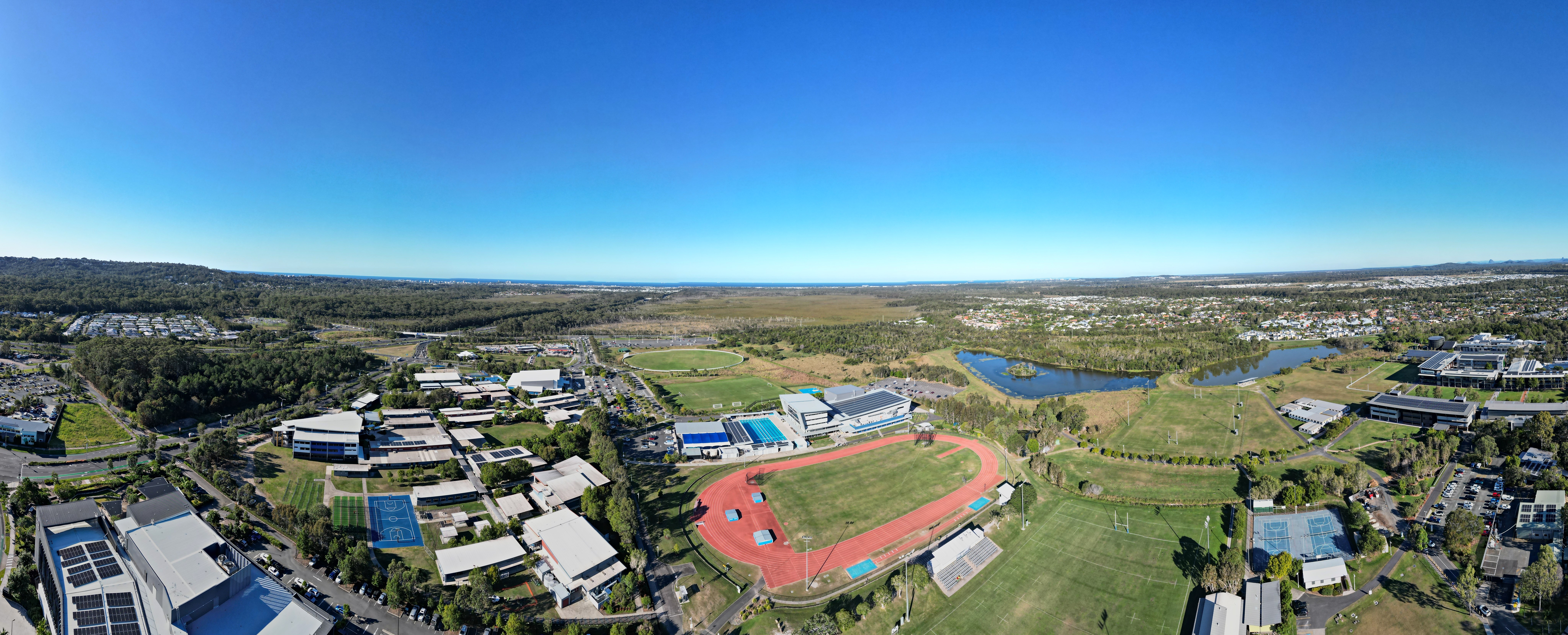
Aerial vista of the University of the Sunshine Coast and its surrounds in 2023.

The earliest residents of the Sunshine Coast were the indigenous Kabi Kabi and Wakka Wakka people. The territory of the Kabi includes about 21,000 square kilometres (8,200 sq mi) along the coastline from the 27th parallel northward to the mouth of the Burrum River. The country of the Wakka Wakka people was about 13,000 km^{2} (5,000 sq mi) that was roughly triangular to the west of the Kabi, including a small part of the Dawson, and meeting the northern Kabi boundary at Walla. The two tribes were friendly and intermarried and had the same class restrictions. The groups were nomadic, gathering food en-route as they moved from one campsite to the next.

Gubbi Gubbi (Kabi Kabi, Cabbee, Carbi, Gabi Gabi) is an Australian Aboriginal language spoken on Kabi Kabi country. The Gubbi Gubbi language region includes the landscape within the local government boundaries of the Sunshine Coast Region and Gympie Region, particularly the towns of Caloundra, Noosa Heads, Gympie and extending north towards Maryborough and south to Caboolture.

=== 18th century ===
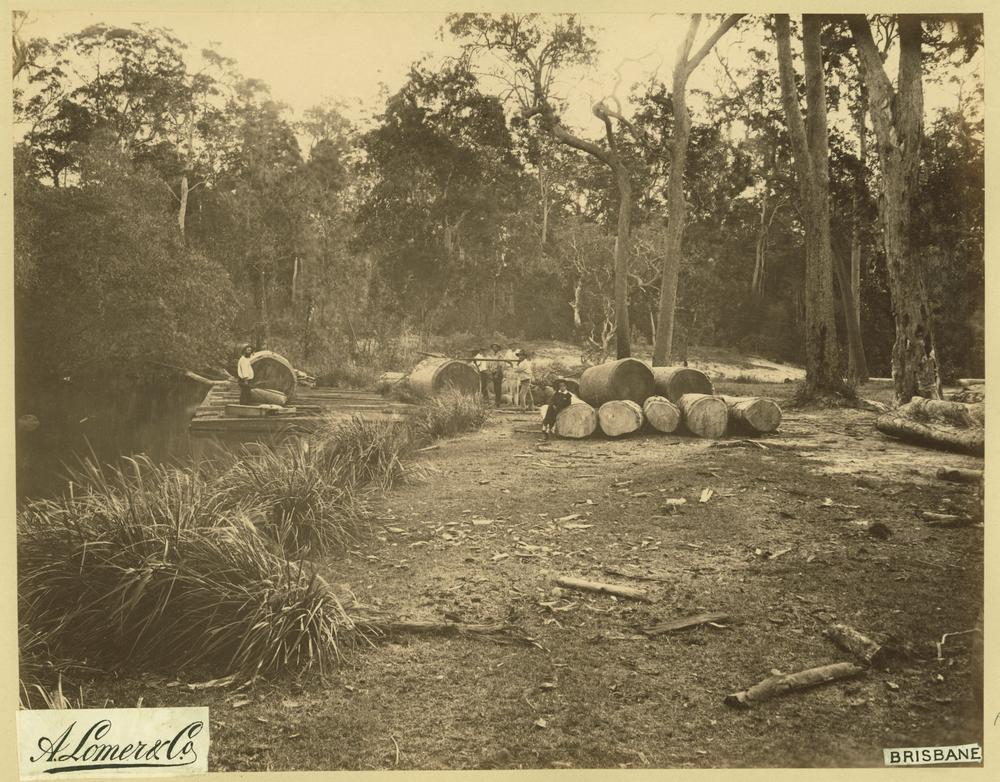
Log rafting on the Noosa River, 1889

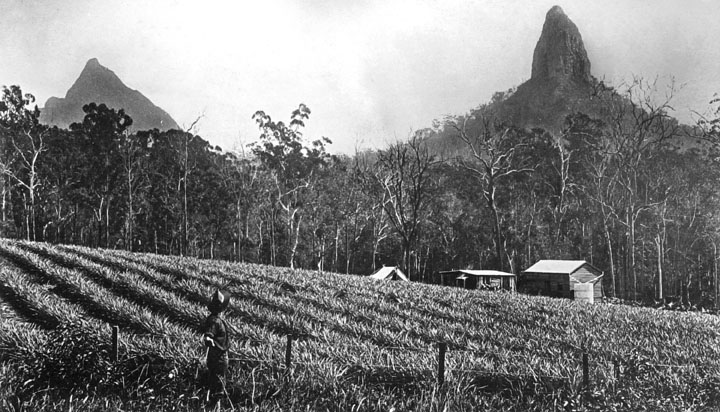
Pineapple plantation in the 1930s

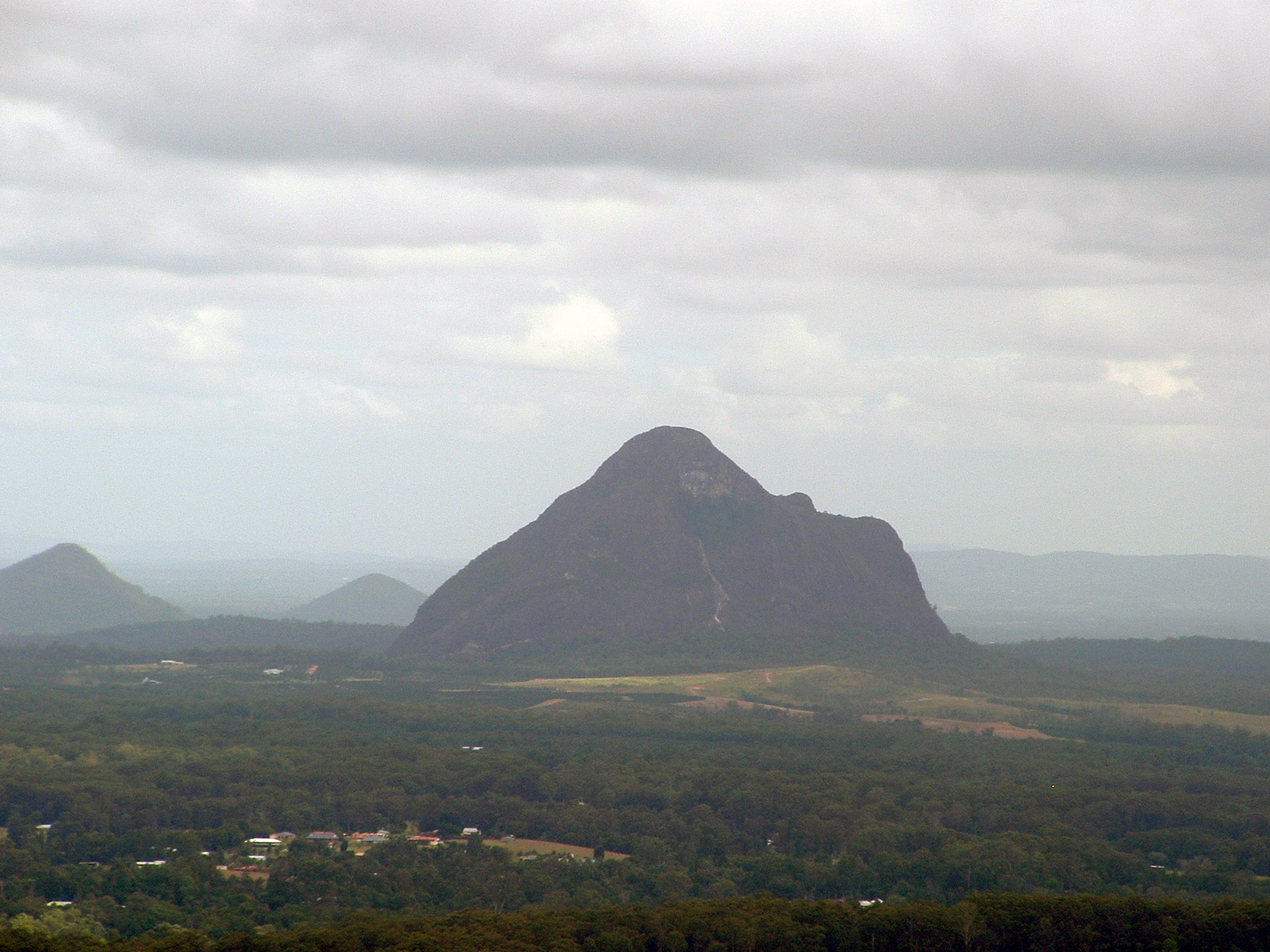
Mount Beerwah is part of the Glass House Mountains National Park

In 1770, James Cook on the deck of HMS Bark Endeavour became the first known European to sight the Glass House Mountains, located south-west of Caloundra.

=== 19th century ===
In the 1820s, former convicts John Finnegan, Thomas Pamphlett and Richard Parsons landed on Moreton Island after becoming hopelessly lost fetching cedar. They lived with the Kabi Kabi for eight months.

Thereafter, during the 1830s to 1840s, the district became home to numerous runaway convicts from the Moreton Bay (Brisbane) penal colony slightly to the south.

In 1842, Governor George Gipps had the entire Sunshine Coast and hinterland from Mount Beerwah north to roughly Eumundi declared a "Bunya Bunya Reserve" for the protection of the bunya tree after Andrew Petrie advised him of the importance of bunya groves in Aboriginal culture. However, during the 1840s and 1850s, the Bunya Bunya Reserve and its vicinity became the scene of some of the most bitter skirmishes of Australia's Black War. The Blackall Range, on account of the tri-annual Bunya Festival, served as both a hideout and rallying point for attacks against white settlements. By the 1850s, timber cutters and cattlemen had started exploiting the area; in 1860 the Bunya Bunya Reserve was scrapped.

Many of the Sunshine Coast's towns began as simple ports or jetties for the timber industry during the 1860s and 1870s, as the area once had magnificent stands of forest. Likewise, the region's roads often began as snigging tracks for hauling timber. Timber getters used the region's creeks, rivers and lakes as seaways to float out their logs of cedar – the resultant wood being shipped as far afield as Europe.

During the Gympie Gold Rush (1867), prospectors scaled the Sunshine Coast mountains to develop easier roadways to and from the gold fields of Gympie. After the construction of the railway line to Gympie, the coastal and river towns, being mostly ports for the early river trade, were bypassed.

By the 1890s, diverse small farming (fruit and dairy) had replaced the cattle-and-timber economy of earlier decades. Sugar cane and pineapples proved especially important to produce for the district. Many small hamlets and towns now emerged. Produce was initially taken by horse to Landsborough, then to Eudlo in 1891.

=== 20th century ===
The post-World War I era saw the rise of the "seaside shack". The seaside shack provided the opportunity for the coastal "getaway" with modest investment. From 1914 to 1946, they popped up all along the North Coast (because it was north of Brisbane). Seaside shacks were exceedingly cheap and were an early use of the concept of recycling. Many were built of disused or second grade timber, all kinds of materials were used for the holiday seaside shack, including fibro cement, metal containers, and left-over farm sheds; even disused trams were sold off as seaside shacks.

Especially after World War II, the Sunshine Coast grew into a holiday and surfing destination. This tendency was further expanded in the development boom of the 1960s and 1970s.

Then known as the Near North Coast, the renaming of the South Coast to become the Gold Coast triggered interest in renaming the Near North Coast to increase the tourist appeal. Names considered included the Silver Coast, the Diamond Coast, and Suncoast. Suncoast was rejected as it was copyrighted by a proprietary company. In 1967, it was officially renamed the Sunshine Coast.

Around the same time, various tourist attractions and theme parks were created, such as the Big Pineapple in Woombye.

After the 1980s, the Sunshine Coast experienced rapid population growth. As of 2016, it had become one of the fastest-growing regions in Australia.

=== 21st century ===
The Moreton sugar mills closure in 2003 removed a market for the district's 120 cane growers who had been harvesting cane in the region.

In 2008, The Shire of Noosa, Shire of Maroochy and City of Caloundra merged to form the Sunshine Coast Region. The 2007 referendum conducted by the Australian Electoral Commission and leading to the merger remained controversial in Noosa Shire, where 95% of voters had rejected amalgamation.

In March 2013, a second referendum resulted in 81% of residents voted to leave the amalgamated Sunshine Coast Region. On 9 November 2013 an election resulted in Noel Playford being elected to take office as mayor on 1 January 2014 with the new council.

== Geography ==
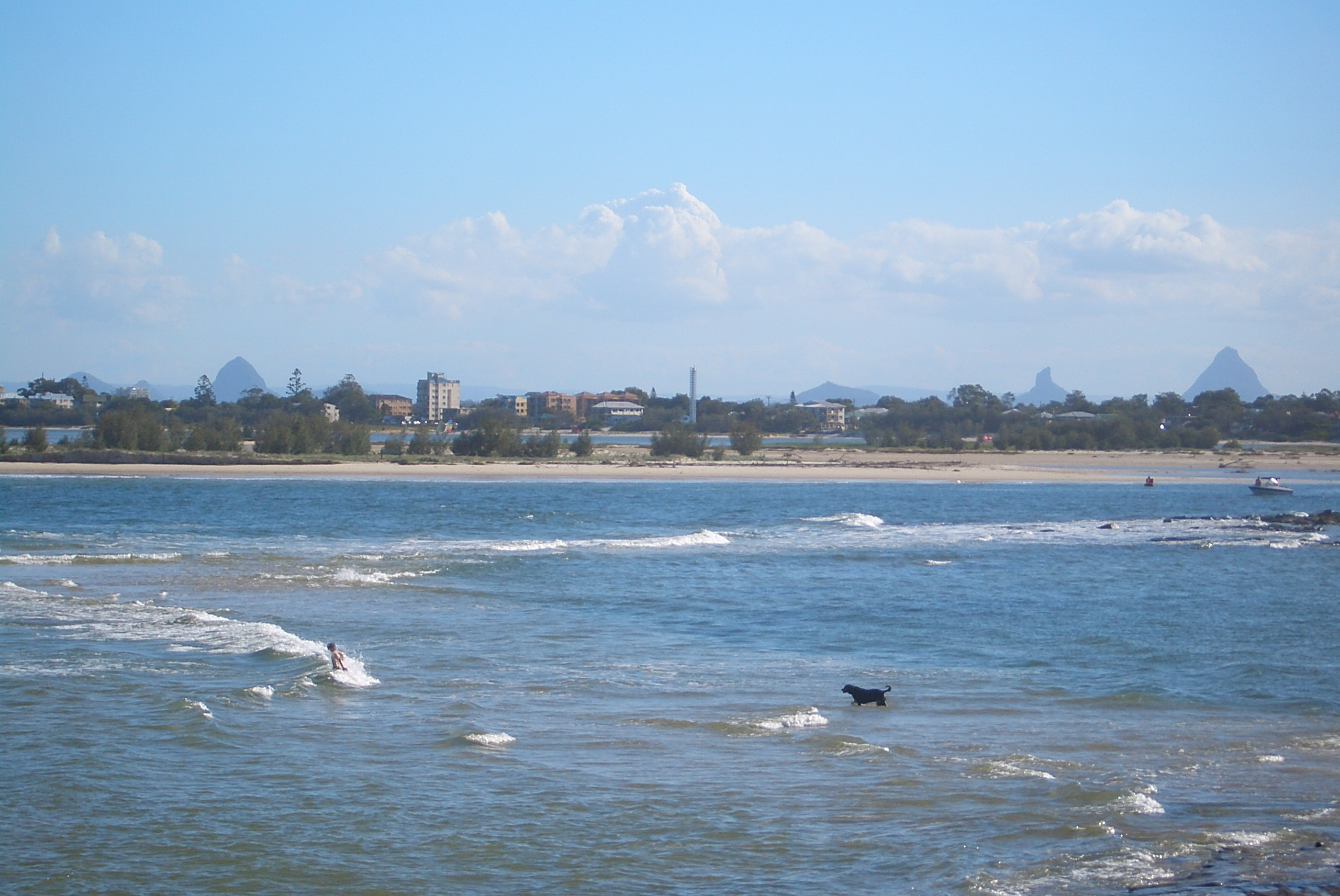
Caloundra, Bribie Island and the Glass House Mountains, 2012

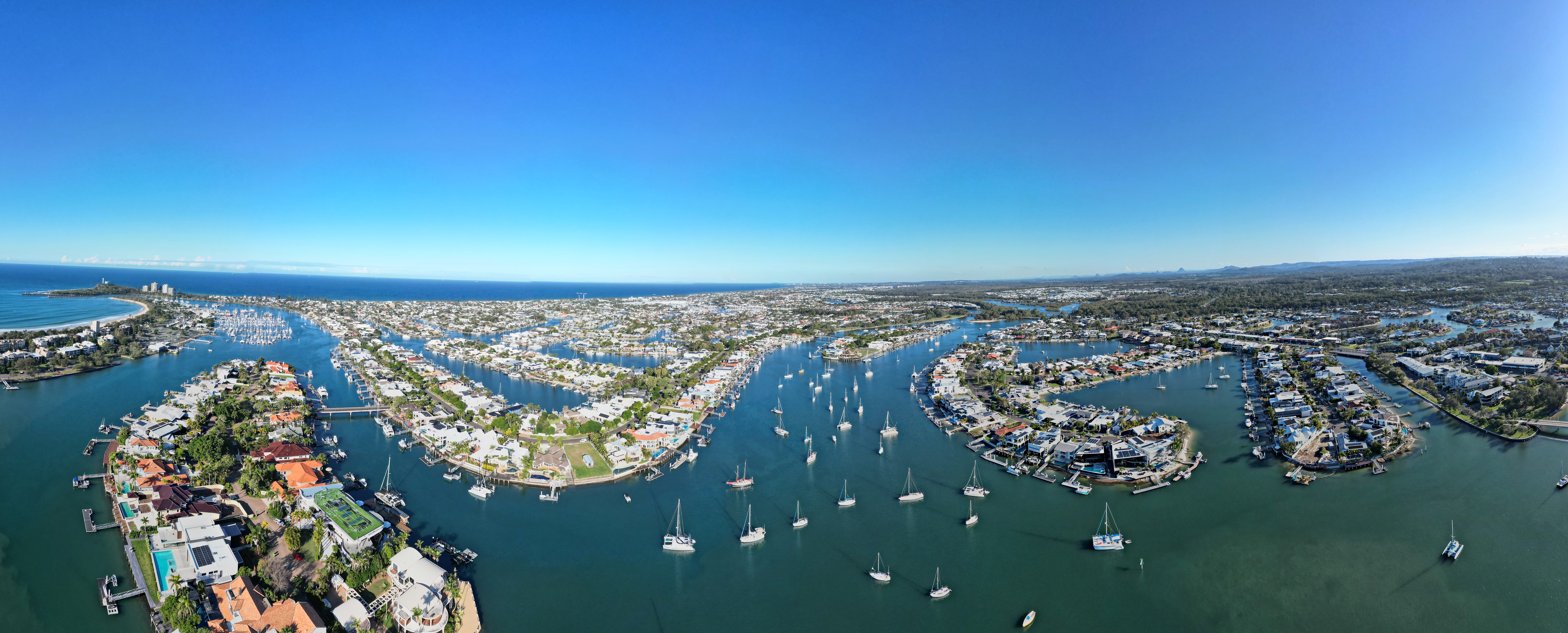
Aerial perspective of Mooloolaba's network of waterways, 2023

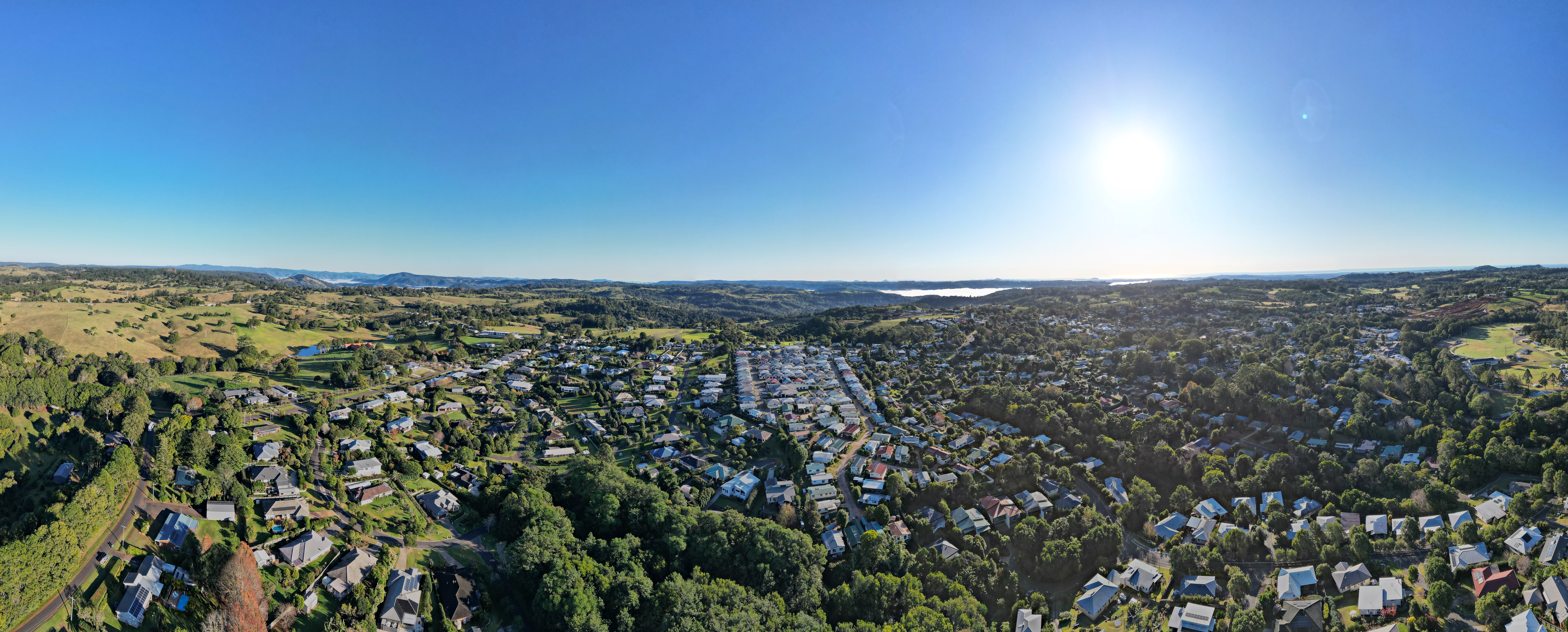
Aerial panorama of Maleny facing Lake Baroon. 2023.

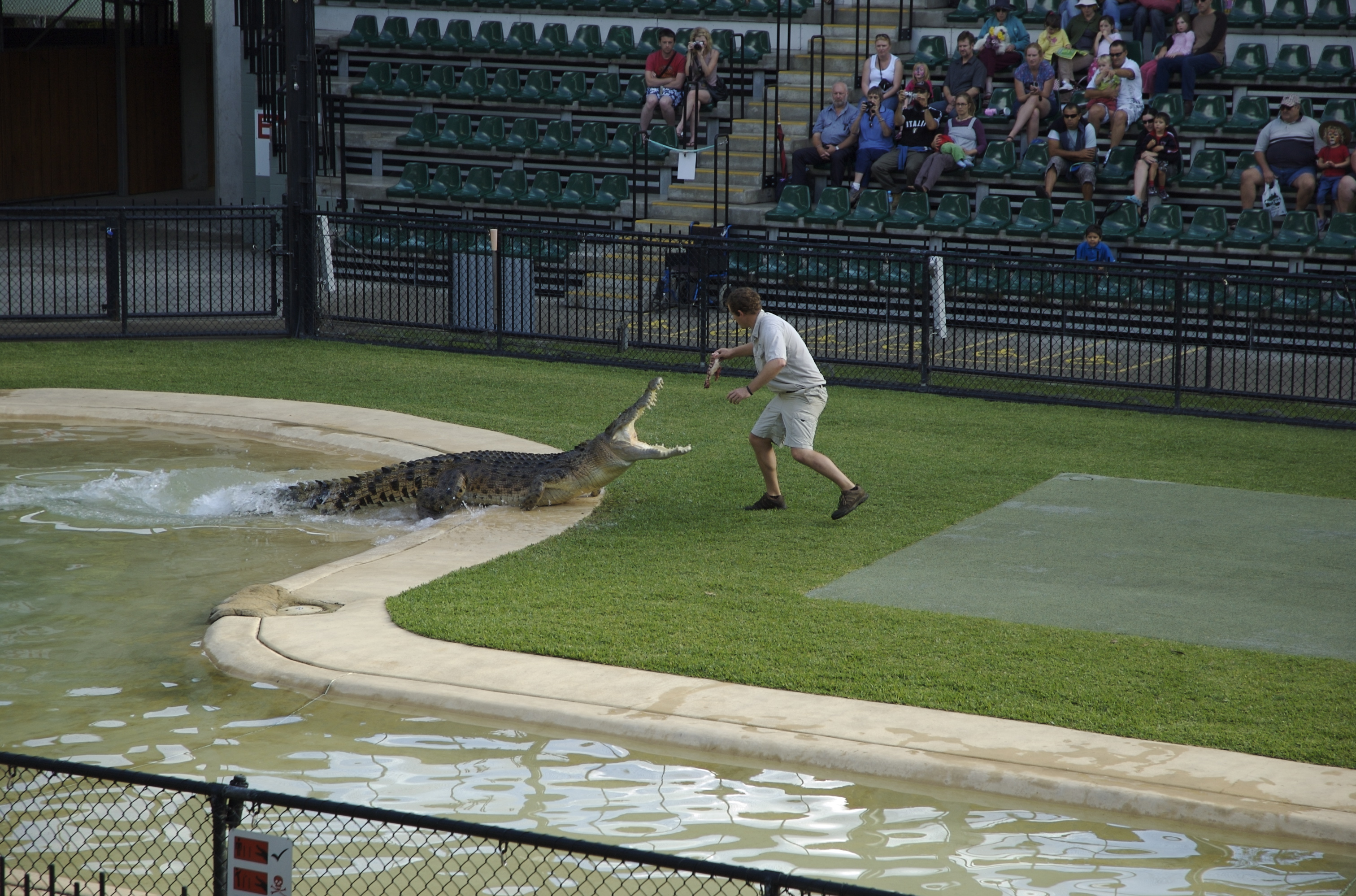
Australia Zoo, 2007

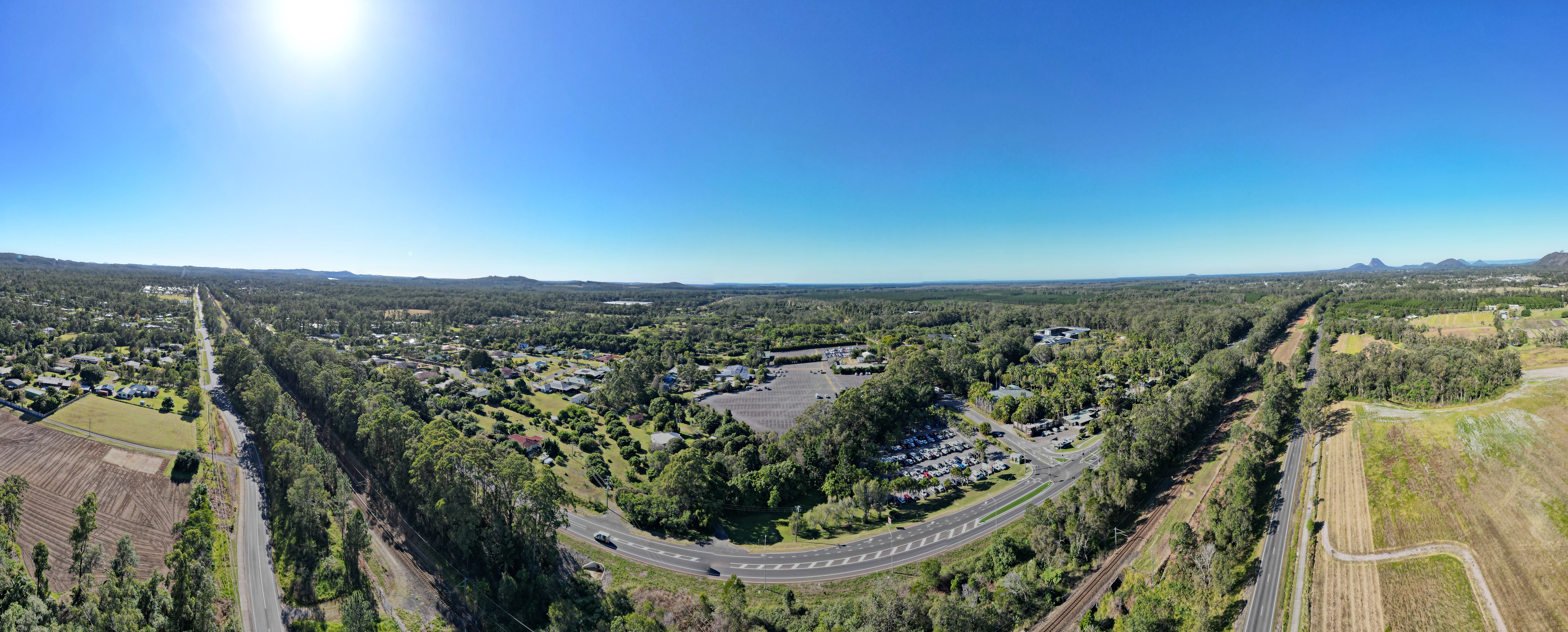
Aerial panorama of the Australia Zoo along Steve Irwin Way. 2023.

Major rivers of the Sunshine Coast include Noosa River, Maroochy River, Mooloolah River and the Stanley River. The region includes several lakes such as Lake Cootharaba and Lake Weyba. Ewen Maddock Dam, Wappa Dam and Baroon Pocket Dam have been built for water storage.

=== Beaches ===
Several stretches of the Sunshine Coast are lined with unbroken beaches – from Sunshine Beach near Noosa to Coolum Beach (17 km (11 mi)); the coast from Point Arkwright to Mudjimba (11 km (6.8 mi)); the Maroochydore–Mooloolaba stretch (5.6 km (3.5 mi)); and from Buddina past the Caloundra CBD to Pelican Waters (22 km (14 mi)). Noosa Main Beach, Alexandra Headland, Mooloolaba (the spit) and Coolum Beach are nationally recognised surfing beaches. Notable beaches include:

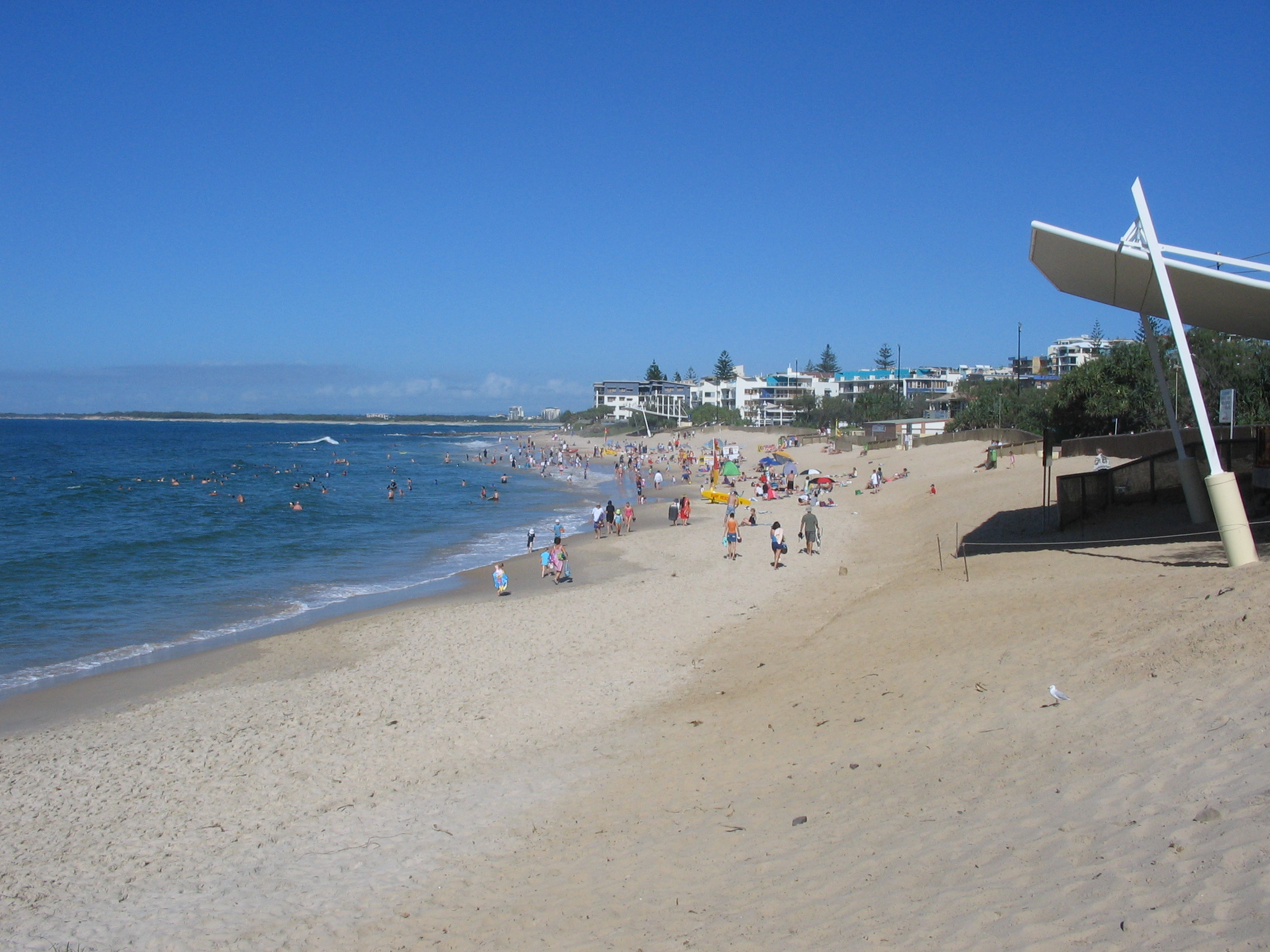
King's Beach, Caloundra, 2006

- Sunshine Beach in Noosa
- Sunrise Beach in Noosa
- Castaways Beach in Noosa
- Marcus Beach in Noosa
- Peregian Beach in Noosa
- Marcoola, Maroochydore
- Mudjimba, Maroochydore
- Mooloolaba, Mooloolaba
- Kawana Waters, between Maroochydore and Caloundra
- Dicky Beach in Caloundra
- Moffat Beach in Caloundra
- Shelly Beach in Caloundra
- Kings Beach in Caloundra
- Golden Beach in Caloundra

=== National parks ===
The Sunshine Coast is home to more individual national parks than any other region in Queensland. The natural biodiversity of the area has been protected by parks in coastal and inland regions, including Glass House Mountains National Park, Kondalilla National Park, Mapleton Falls National Park, Mooloolah River National Park, Noosa National Park, and the Great Sandy National Park, which includes sections on K'gari and in Cooloola near Rainbow Beach. The Conservation park of Mary Cairncross Reserve was donated by three daughters of Mary Cairncross (1848–1918) in 1941. The protected area of Currimundi Lake (Kathleen McArthur) Conservation Park was gazetted as an environmental park in 1975 and declared a conservation park in 1994.

=== Biosphere reserves ===
The Sunshine Coast has three UNESCO biosphere reserves side-by-side, the only global location with that distinction. These include the Great Sandy Biosphere Reserve at the Fraser Coast, the Noosa Biosphere Reserve, and the Sunshine Coast Biosphere.

=== Climate ===
Sunshine Coast has a humid subtropical climate (Cfa) typical of South Queensland. Summers are generally hot, but moderated compared to areas on similar latitudes elsewhere. Winters retain warm days, but have cooler nights rendering it falling into the subtropical fold. There is no dry season and precipitation is generally quite high.

The average temperature of the sea ranges from 21.2 °C (70.2 °F) in August to 27.1 °C (80.8 °F) in February at Mooloolaba, and from 21.2 °C (70.2 °F) in August to 27.3 °C (81.1 °F) in February at Noosa Heads.

Climate data for Sunshine Coast Airport (1996–2025)
Month	Jan	Feb	Mar	Apr	May	Jun	Jul	Aug	Sep	Oct	Nov	Dec	Year
Record high °C (°F)	41.3 (106.3)	38.7 (101.7)	36.2 (97.2)	33.5 (92.3)	31.5 (88.7)	29.1 (84.4)	31.4 (88.5)	35.0 (95.0)	35.7 (96.3)	37.0 (98.6)	41.0 (105.8)	38.4 (101.1)	41.3 (106.3)
Mean maximum °C (°F)	33.4 (92.1)	32.7 (90.9)	31.6 (88.9)	29.8 (85.6)	26.9 (80.4)	25.4 (77.7)	25.4 (77.7)	27.7 (81.9)	30.1 (86.2)	32.4 (90.3)	32.8 (91.0)	33.8 (92.8)	36.1 (97.0)
Mean daily maximum °C (°F)	29.1 (84.4)	28.9 (84.0)	28.0 (82.4)	26.1 (79.0)	23.6 (74.5)	21.5 (70.7)	21.1 (70.0)	22.3 (72.1)	24.3 (75.7)	25.7 (78.3)	27.3 (81.1)	28.4 (83.1)	25.5 (77.9)
Daily mean °C (°F)	25.2 (77.4)	25.2 (77.4)	24.2 (75.6)	21.6 (70.9)	18.7 (65.7)	16.4 (61.5)	15.4 (59.7)	16.2 (61.2)	18.7 (65.7)	20.7 (69.3)	22.7 (72.9)	24.2 (75.6)	20.8 (69.4)
Mean daily minimum °C (°F)	21.3 (70.3)	21.4 (70.5)	20.3 (68.5)	17.1 (62.8)	13.7 (56.7)	11.3 (52.3)	9.7 (49.5)	10.0 (50.0)	13.0 (55.4)	15.7 (60.3)	18.0 (64.4)	20.0 (68.0)	16.0 (60.7)
Mean minimum °C (°F)	17.3 (63.1)	17.9 (64.2)	15.9 (60.6)	11.7 (53.1)	6.7 (44.1)	4.0 (39.2)	3.2 (37.8)	3.6 (38.5)	6.7 (44.1)	9.7 (49.5)	12.4 (54.3)	15.0 (59.0)	2.3 (36.1)
Record low °C (°F)	14.5 (58.1)	14.4 (57.9)	10.9 (51.6)	7.3 (45.1)	3.3 (37.9)	1.5 (34.7)	−0.7 (30.7)	1.3 (34.3)	3.4 (38.1)	7.1 (44.8)	5.7 (42.3)	10.0 (50.0)	−0.7 (30.7)
Average rainfall mm (inches)	155.2 (6.11)	217.5 (8.56)	187.7 (7.39)	147.3 (5.80)	161.9 (6.37)	106.2 (4.18)	70.6 (2.78)	67.9 (2.67)	52.3 (2.06)	91.7 (3.61)	85.2 (3.35)	154.8 (6.09)	1,498.3 (58.97)
Average rainy days (≥ 1 mm)	10.3	11.6	12.5	11.1	10.2	8.7	6.9	5.3	5.5	7.4	7.0	10.0	106.5
Average afternoon relative humidity (%)	70	71	69	68	65	63	59	59	63	66	67	69	66
Average dew point °C (°F)	21.0 (69.8)	21.1 (70.0)	19.8 (67.6)	17.6 (63.7)	14.5 (58.1)	12.3 (54.1)	10.6 (51.1)	11.3 (52.3)	14.2 (57.6)	16.3 (61.3)	18.1 (64.6)	19.9 (67.8)	16.4 (61.5)
Source: Bureau of Meteorology (Dew point for 3pm)

== Economy ==
The Sunshine Coast economy has outpaced most of the regional economies in Australia in terms of growth over the last 15 years. The strength of the regional economy is based in its diversity and strength across a number of key sectors including healthcare, education, finance and professional business services. Australian Bureau of Statistics (ABS) data from the May 2019 Labour Force Survey indicate that around 184,200 people were employed in the Sunshine Coast region. Health care and social assistance was the largest employment sector with 26,800 people, followed by construction with 26,500 people, and education and training with 21,200 people. Other important employment sectors in the region were accommodation and food services; retail trade; and professional, scientific and technical services. The agriculture, forestry and fishing sector employed 2,600 people, representing 1 per cent of the region's workforce.

=== Tourism ===
The Sunshine Coast is a centre for tourism, attracting more than 3.2 million visitors a year. There are significant attractions, such as Steve Irwin's Australia Zoo, Sea Life, Aussie World, the Buderim Ginger Factory, the Big Pineapple, the Eumundi Markets and the Majestic Theatre, Pomona.

Sports tourism is supported by several annual sporting events such as the Mooloolaba Triathlon, Noosa Triathlon and Sunshine Coast Marathon.

The Sunshine Coast is served by the Sunshine Coast Airport 10 kilometres (6.2 mi) north of Maroochydore, though many tourists also arrive from Brisbane Airport which is 100 kilometres (62 mi) to the south.

As of November 2020, the Sunshine Coast is home of NightQuarter, an Eat Street-style precinct with live music and other immersive experiences.

The Sunshine Coast region is home to many tour operators which are supported by welcomed 3.6 million domestic overnight visitors in the year ending September 2021. These visitors spent an estimated $2.7 billion in the region and help sustain local businesses.

=== Agriculture ===
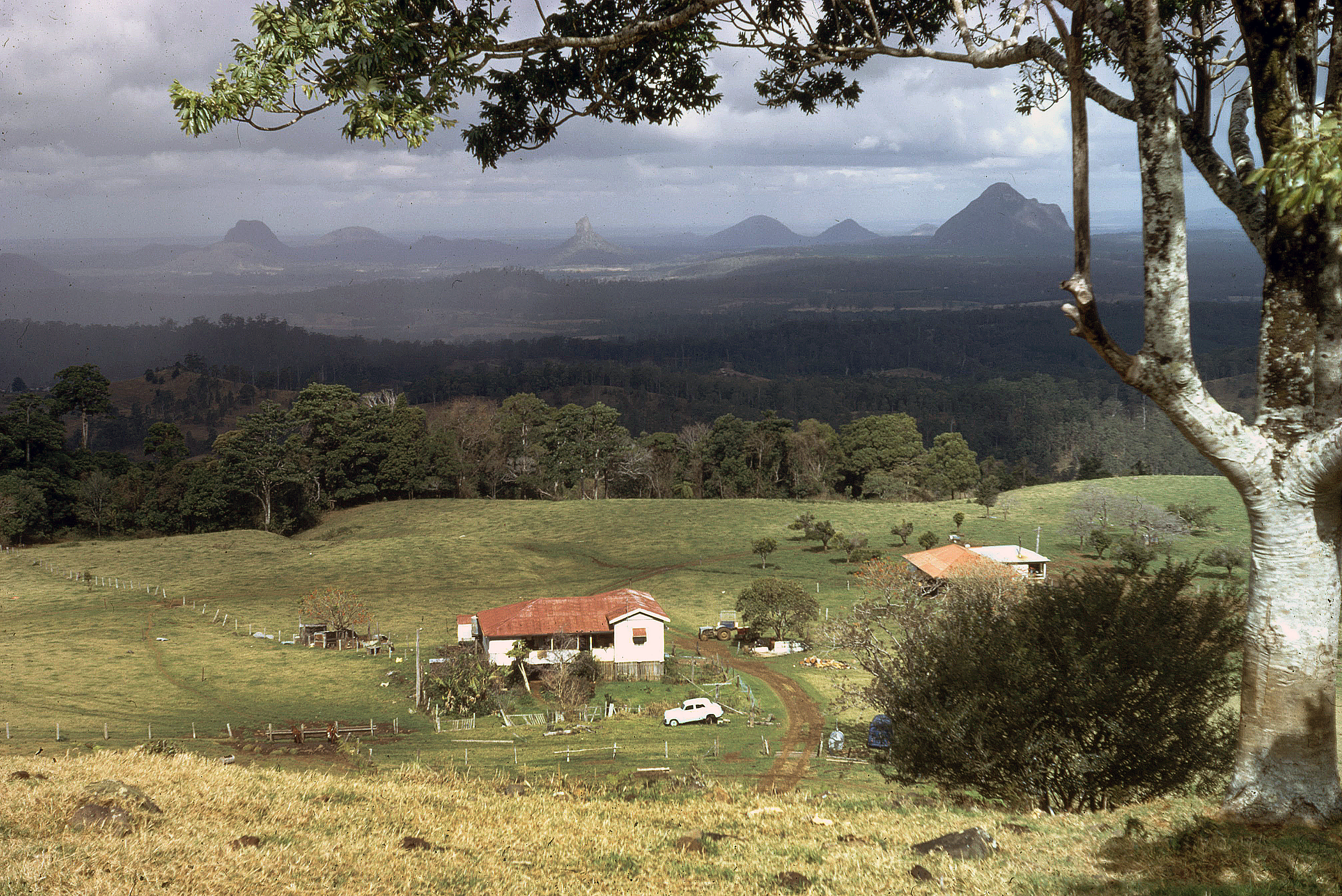
Sunshine Coast hinterland farm, 1971

In 2017–18, the gross value of agricultural production in the Sunshine Coast region was $217 million, which was 2 per cent of the total gross value of agricultural production in Queensland ($13 billion).

Agricultural land in the Sunshine Coast region occupies 1,100 square kilometres, or 36 per cent of the region. Areas classified as conservation and natural environments (nature conservation, protected areas and minimal use) occupy 880 square kilometres, or 29 per cent of the region. The most common land use by area is grazing native vegetation, which occupies 530 square kilometres or 17 per cent of the Sunshine Coast region.

The Sunshine Coast region has a diverse agricultural sector. The most important commodities in the region based on the gross value of agricultural production were poultry ($66 million), followed by strawberries ($35 million) and milk ($29 million). These commodities together contributed 60 per cent of the total value of agricultural production in the region.

=== Arts ===
The Sunshine Coast region is home to art galleries, performance venues, festivals, and theatre companies and classical music ensembles.

- Caloundra Regional Gallery
- Landsborough Shire Museum
- Noosa Regional Gallery
- Queensland Air Museum, Caloundra
- The Events Centre, Caloundra
- The J, venue, Noosa
- Lind Lane Theatre, Nambour
- Maleny Community Centre
- Horizon Festival, Kabi Kabi and Jinibara culture
- Noosa Alive! festival
- Noosa Jazz Festival
- Sunshine Coast Chamber Music Festival
- BATS Theatre Company, Buderim
- Buderim Youth Theatre of Excellence
- Caloundra Chorale and Theatre Company, Wurtulla
- Coolum Theatre Players
- Little Seed Theatre Company, several places
- Maleny Players, theatre group
- Noosa Arts Theatre
- Noosa Orchestra
- Noosa Chorale
- Oriana Arts, Buderim; includes Oriana Choir, Sunshine Coast Youth Choir, Oriana Ensemble
- Pacific Chamber Players
- Sunshine Coast Chamber Orchestra
- Sunshine Coast Choral Society, Buderim
- Sunshine Coast Symphony Orchestra
- Sunshine Coast Youth Orchestra

== Media ==
=== Radio ===
Like most of regional Australia, Digital radio is not available, Radio stations that broadcast to the region are:

- ABC Sunshine Coast (part of ABC Local Radio, public)
- 91.1 Hot FM (commercial), part of ARN Media (Australian Radio Network)
- 91.9 Sea FM, Maroochydore (commercial)
- 92.7 Mix FM, Gympie/Noosa (commercial)
- Zinc 96.1, Maroochydore (commercial)
- Sunshine FM 104.9 (community)

=== Television ===
The region is served by 3 major free-to-air commercial television networks:

- STQ (Sunshine Television, Queensland) – Seven Network owned and operated
- RTQ, part of WIN Television – Nine Network affiliate
- 10 Queensland – Network 10 owned and operated
- ABC Television
- SBS Television

Of the three major commercial networks:

- Seven News airs a half-hour local bulletin for the Sunshine Coast, airing each weeknight at 6pm. It is produced and broadcast from studios in the city.
- WIN News airs a half-hour statewide news bulletin for Regional Queensland, airing each weeknight at 5:30pm. Select local stories from the Sunshine Coast is inserted into this bulletin, although local weather remains intact at the end of the bulletin as an opt-out window. It is produced from a newsroom in the city and broadcast from studios in Wollongong. A dedicated local WIN News bulletin for the Sunshine Coast was broadcast until 30th June 2021.
- Network 10 airs short regional 10 News updates throughout the day, broadcast from studios in Hobart.

Maroochydore also falls under the Brisbane television license area, allowing residents to receive Brisbane commercial stations such as Seven's BTQ, Nine's QTQ and 10's TVQ.

=== Newspapers ===
The Sunshine Coast is served by these newspapers:

- Sunshine Coast Daily
- Sunshine Coast News
- Coolum Advertiser covering the Coolum area.
- Glasshouse & Maleny Country News serving Beerwah and the southern hinterland area.
- Noosa Today serving Noosa and northern parts of the region.
- The Sunshine Valley Gazette serving Nambour, Woombye, Palmwoods, Yandina, and the Blackall Range.

== Demographics ==
At the 2016 census, the population of the Sunshine Coast was 346,522. The median age was 44 years old, 6 years older than the nationwide median. The male-to-female ratio was 48.3-to-51.7. Most residents were born in Australia (73.7%), with 1.9% being Indigenous Australians. The most common countries of birth of other residents were England (6.2%), New Zealand (4.5%), South Africa (1.0%), Germany (0.7%), and Scotland (0.6%). The most commonly spoken languages other than English were German (0.6%), and Afrikaans, Dutch, French, and Italian (0.3% each). A large proportion of Sunshine Coast residents reported no religious affiliation (34.0%). Of those who had a religious affiliation, the most frequent were: Catholic (18.2%), Anglican (16.8%), and Uniting Church (5.2%).

== Notable persons ==
=== Miss Earth ===
Jessica Lane, Miss Earth 2024
