= Marcus Beach, Queensland =

Marcus Beach Noosa, Queensland
- Coordinates: 26.4483°S 153.1011°E
- Population: 839 (2021 census)
  - Density: 215.1/km^{2} (557/sq mi)
- Postcode(s): 4573
- Area: 3.9 km^{2} (1.5 sq mi)
- Time zone: AEST (UTC+10:00)
- Location: 7.3 km (5 mi) S of Noosa Heads; 15.9 km (10 mi) SE of Tewantin; 28.0 km (17 mi) N of Maroochydore; 134 km (83 mi) N of Brisbane
- LGA(s): Shire of Noosa
- State electorate(s): Noosa
- Federal division(s): Wide Bay
Suburbs around Marcus Beach:
Noosaville	Castaways Beach	Castaways Beach
Noosaville	Marcus Beach	Coral Sea
Peregian Beach	Peregian Beach	Coral Sea

Marcus Beach is a coastal suburb in the Shire of Noosa, Queensland, Australia. In the 2021 census, Marcus Beach had a population of 839 people.

== Geography ==
The suburb takes its name from the beach Marcus Beach (26.4501°S 153.1036°E) which extends north in neighbouring Castaways Beach.

The suburb is bounded to the east (in part) by the Coral Sea, to the south-east by Peregian Creek, to the west by Lake Weyba (26.4392°S 153.0742°E) and to the north-east (in part) by Castaways Creek.

Most of the locality is within the protected area of Noosa National Park with the remaining land use being suburban residential land in the locality's south-east.

Marcus Creek flows though the suburb immediately north of the residential area and enters the Coral Sea (26.4526°S 153.1025°E).

== History ==
Marcus Beach was named after the property developer, Marcus Burke, the grandson of T.M. Burke.

Historically and currently, Marcus Beach is within the local government area of Shire of Noosa, but, between 2008 and 2013, Marcus Beach (and the rest of the Shire of Noosa) was within Sunshine Coast Region.

== Demographics ==
In the 2016 census, Marcus Beach had a population of 757 people.

In the 2021 census, Marcus Beach had a population of 839 people.

== Education ==
There are no schools in Marcus Beach. The nearest government primary school is Sunshine Beach State School in Sunshine Beach to the north. The nearest government secondary schools are Sunshine Beach State High School in Sunshine Beach and Coolum State High School in Coolum Beach to the south.

== Amenities ==
There are a number of parks in the suburb:

- Cherrywood Park (26.4517°S 153.0960°E)
- Chestnut Court Natural Amenity Reserve (26.4578°S 153.0983°E)
- Hawthorn Park (26.4509°S 153.0959°E)
- Mahogany Bushland Reserve (26.4557°S 153.0967°E)
- Marcus Beach Foreshore Reserve (26.4567°S 153.1012°E)
- Marcus Creek Bushland Reserve (26.4508°S 153.1009°E)
- Peregian Creek Reserve (26.4612°S 153.0992°E)
- Sandalwood Close Natural Amenity Reserve (26.4569°S 153.0960°E)
- Tecoma Close Natural Amenity Reserve (26.4588°S 153.0948°E)
- Tristania Drive Car Park (26.4569°S 153.1004°E)
