= Castaways Beach, Queensland =

Castaways Beach
- Suburb
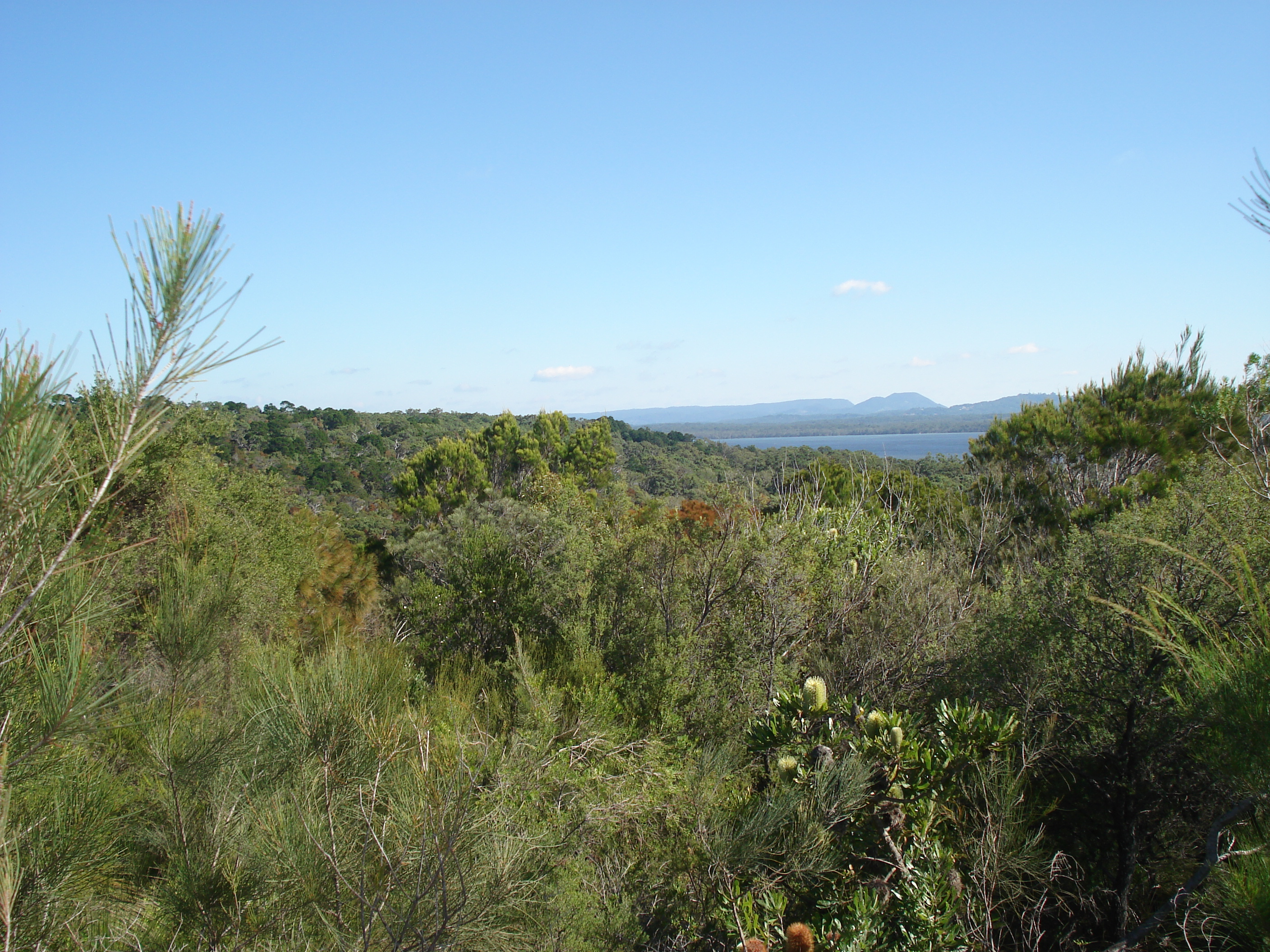
- The view from Castaways Beach across the Noosa National Park to Lake Weyba with the Noosa Hinterland in the distance

- Interactive map of Castaways Beach
- Coordinates: 26.4316°S 153.1011°E
- Country: Australia
- State: Queensland
- City: Noosa
- LGA: Shire of Noosa
- Location: 3.4 km (2.1 mi) S of Sunshine Beach; 5.1 km (3.2 mi) SE of Noosa Heads; 13.7 km (8.5 mi) ESE of Tewantin; 133 km (83 mi) N of Brisbane

Government
  - State electorate: Noosa
  - Federal division: Wide Bay

Area
  - Total: 2.8 km^{2} (1.1 sq mi)

Population
  - Total: 683 (2021 census)
  - Density: 244/km^{2} (632/sq mi)
- Time zone: UTC+10:00 (AEST)
- Postcode: 4567
Suburbs around Castaways Beach
Noosa Heads	Sunrise Beach	Coral Sea
Noosa NP	Castaways Beach	Coral Sea
Noosa NP	Marcus Beach	Coral Sea

Castaways Beach is a coastal suburb in the Shire of Noosa, Queensland, Australia. It is located 5.1 kilometres (3 mi) by road south-east of Noosa Heads. In the 2021 census, Castaways Beach had a population of 683 people.

== Geography ==
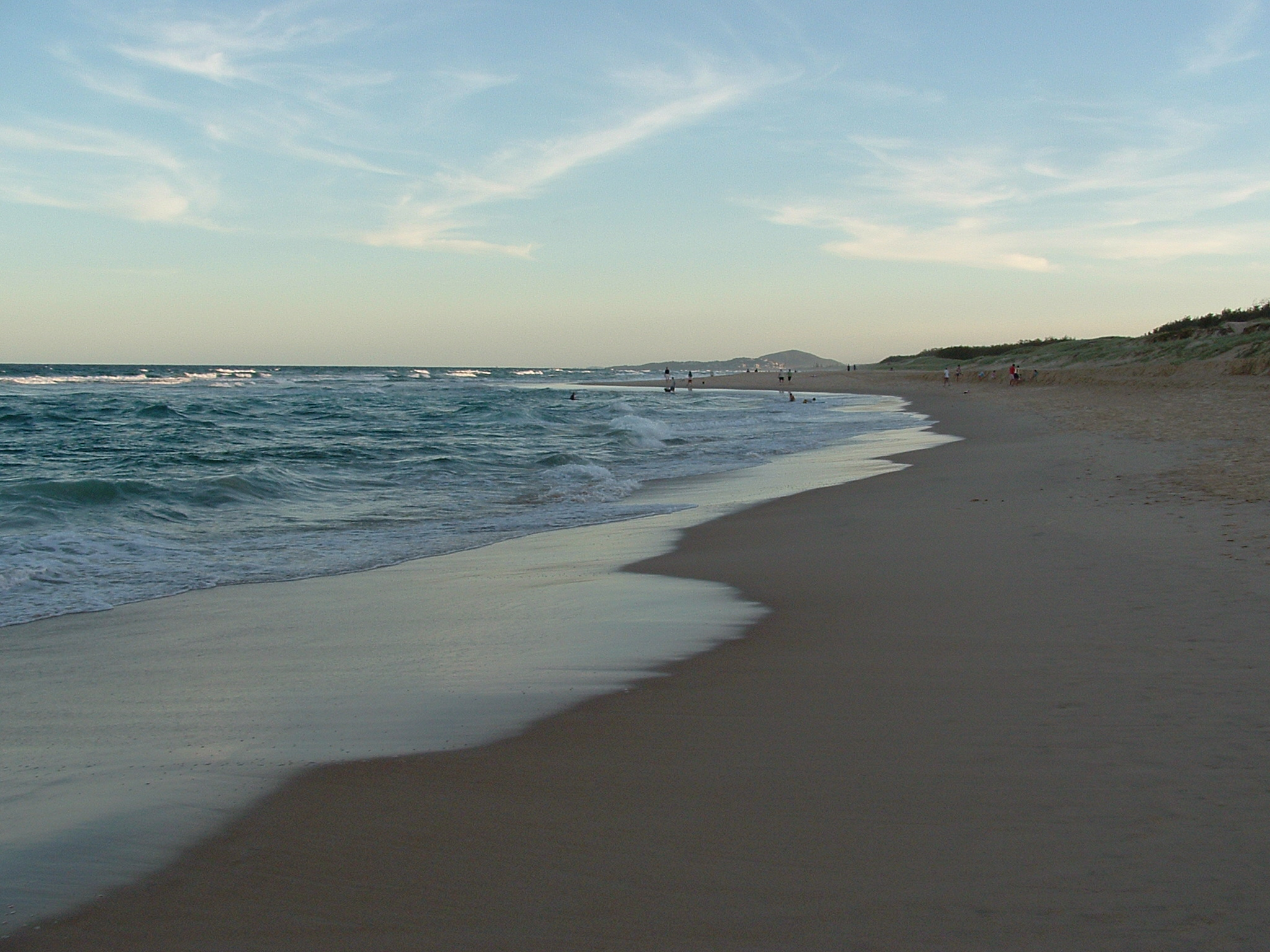
Castaways Beach looking south

The suburb is bounded to the east by the Coral Sea and to the west by Lake Weyba. Apart from the eastern strip of housing along the coast, most of Castaways Beach is within the Noosa National Park.

Castaways Creek rises in the south of the suburb and flows east into the Coral Sea (26.4372°S 153.1052°E). Its mouth divides the sandy coast into two beaches:

- Castaways Beach (26.4314°S 153.1075°E) extending north to the neighbouring suburb of Sunrise Beach
- Marcus Beach (26.4501°S 153.1036°E) extending south to the neighbouring suburb of Marcus Beach

== History ==
Between 2008 and 2013, Castaways Beach (and the rest of the Shire of Noosa) was within the Sunshine Coast Region (following an unpopular local government amalgamation that was subsequently reversed).

== Demographics ==
In the 2006 census, Castaways Beach had a population of 617 people.

In the 2011 census, Castaways Beach had a population of 606 people, a decline of 1% in the area since the 2006 census. The predominant age group in Castaways Beach was 45–54 years.

In the 2016 census, Castaways Beach had a population of 656 people.

In the 2021 census, Castaways Beach had a population of 683 people.

== Education ==
There are no schools in Castaways Beach. The nearest government primary and secondary school are Sunshine Beach State School and Sunshine Beach State High School, both in Sunshine Beach to the north.
