= Sunrise Beach, Queensland =

Sunrise Beach
- Suburb
- Interactive map of Sunrise Beach
- Coordinates: 26.4163°S 153.1052°E
- Country: Australia
- State: Queensland
- City: Noosa Heads
- LGA: Shire of Noosa
- Location: 3.7 km (2.3 mi) SE of Noosa Heads; 11 km (6.8 mi) ESE of Tewantin; 136 km (85 mi) N of Brisbane

Government
  - State electorate: Noosa
  - Federal division: Wide Bay

Area
  - Total: 2.4 km^{2} (0.93 sq mi)

Population
  - Total: 3,687 (2021 census)
  - Density: 1,540/km^{2} (3,980/sq mi)
- Time zone: UTC+10:00 (AEST)
- Postcode: 4567
Suburbs around Sunrise Beach
Noosa Heads	Sunshine Beach	Coral Sea
Noosa Heads	Sunrise Beach	Coral Sea
Castaways Beach	Castaways Beach	Coral Sea

Sunrise Beach is a coastal suburb in the Shire of Noosa, Queensland, Australia. In the 2021 census, Sunrise Beach had a population of 3,687 people.

== Geography ==
Sunrise Beach is 3.7 kilometres (2 mi) by road southeast of Noosa Heads.

== History ==
Between 2008 and 2013, Sunrise Beach (and the rest of the Shire of Noosa) was within Sunshine Coast Region. Streets in Sunrise Beach were named to commemorate Australia's victory in the 1983 America's Cup including Ben Lexcen Drive (yacht designer Ben Lexcen), Conner Place (American yachtsman Dennis Conner), Newport Street (Newport, Rhode Island, the location of the competition), Columbia Crescent (the winning yachts of 1899, 1901 and 1958), Defender Court (winning yacht of 1937), Intrepid Place (winning yacht of 1967 and 1970), Dame Pattie Dr (Australian yacht in the 1967 race), Mylar Ct (material used in sails), Bond Court (Alan Bond who funded Australia's 1983 challenge) and Victory Crescent.

== Demographics ==
In the 2016 census, Sunrise Beach had a population of 3,415 people.

In the 2021 census, Sunrise Beach had a population of 3,687 people.

== Amenities ==
The Shire of Noosa operates a mobile library service on a weekly basis at the Sunrise Beach shops.

== Education ==
There are no schools in Sunrise Beach. The nearest government primary school is Sunshine Beach State School in neighbouring Sunshine Beach to the north. The nearest government secondary school is Sunshine Beach State High School, also in Sunshine Beach.

== Notable people ==
- Mia Wray (born 1995), Australian pop singer and songwriter
