= Noosa Heads, Queensland =

Noosa Heads
- Town
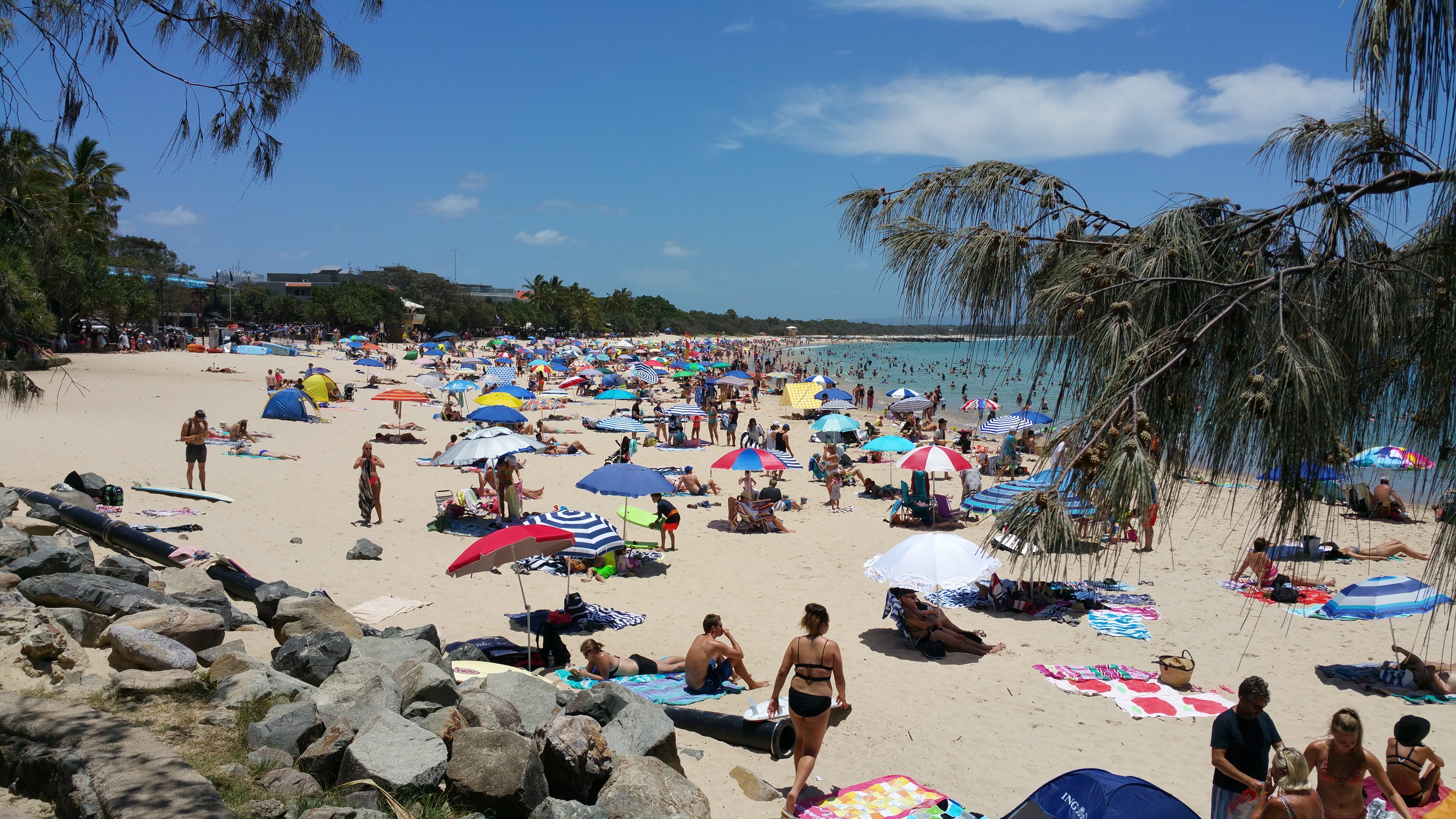
- Noosa main beach

- Interactive map of Noosa Heads
- Coordinates: 26.3870°S 153.0913°E
- Country: Australia
- State: Queensland
- City: Noosa
- LGA: Shire of Noosa
- Location: 8.6 km (5.3 mi) E of Tewantin; 35.4 km (22.0 mi) N of Maroochydore; 135 km (84 mi) N of Brisbane; 67 km (42 mi) ESE of Gympie

Government
  - State electorate: Noosa
  - Federal division: Wide Bay

Area
  - Total: 13.0 km^{2} (5.0 sq mi)
- Elevation: 21 m (69 ft)

Population
  - Total: 5,120 (2021 census)
  - Density: 393.8/km^{2} (1,020/sq mi)
- Time zone: UTC+10:00 (AEST)
- Postcode: 4567
Localities around Noosa Heads
Noosa North Shore	Coral Sea	Coral Sea
Noosaville	Noosa Heads	Sunshine Beach
Noosaville	Castaways Beach	Sunrise Beach

Noosa Heads is a coastal town and suburb in the Shire of Noosa, Queensland, Australia. It is a popular holiday destination. In the 2021 census, the suburb of Noosa Heads had a population of 5,120 people.

== Geography ==
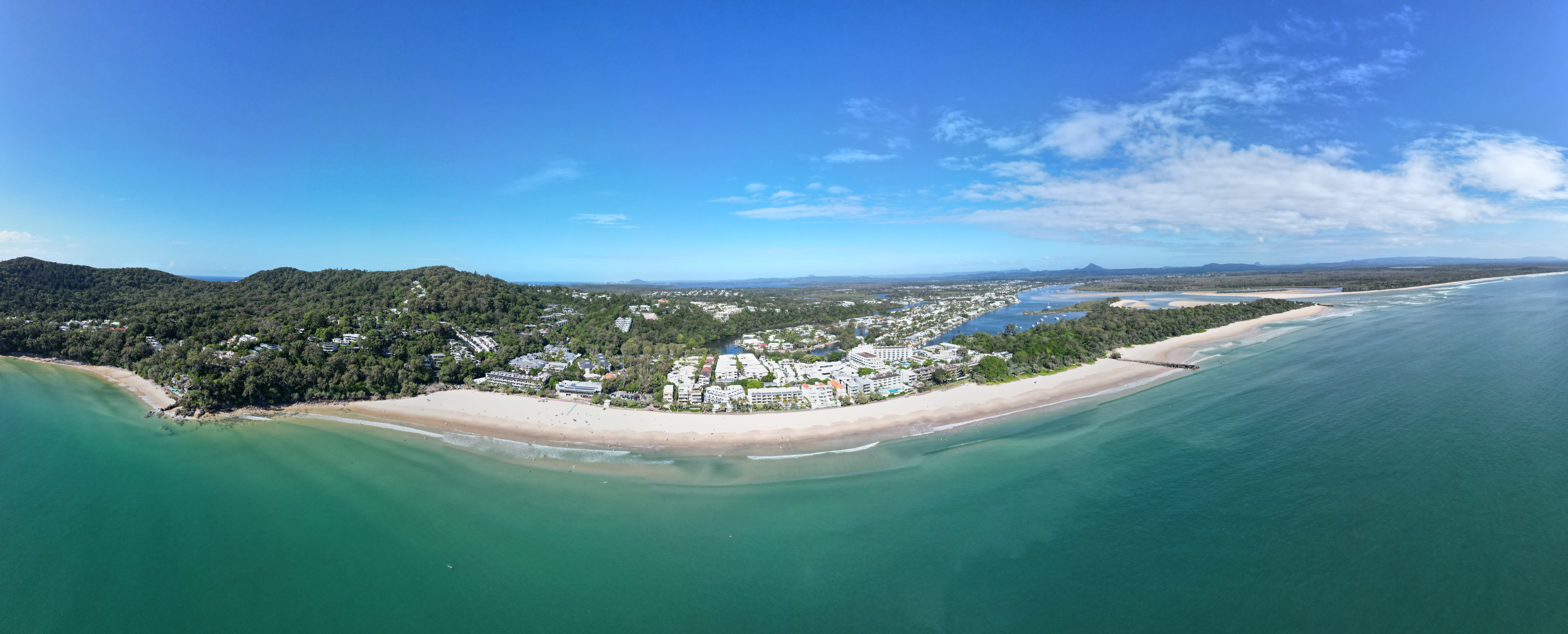
Noosa Heads, with Main Beach in the centre of the frame.

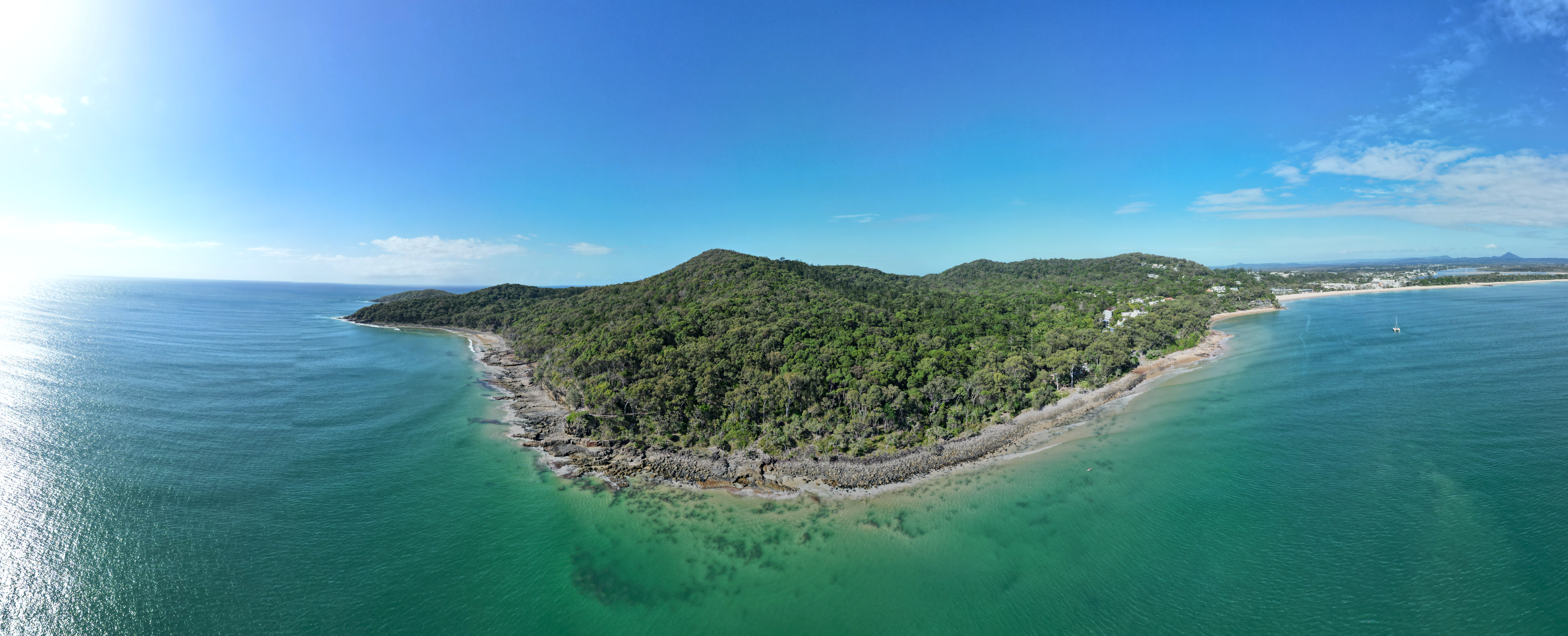
Panorama of the Noosa Headlands and its myriad rockpools

The suburb is bounded to the west by Weyba Creek and the Noosa River and to the north and east by the Coral Sea. The northeast of the locality is within the Noosa National Park. Noosa Heads, Noosaville and Tewantin form a continuous urban area at the northern end of the Sunshine Coast.

Noosa Hill in the national park is the highest point of the suburb (26.3840°S 153.1053°E) at 146 metres (479 ft) above sea level. There is also Laguna Lookout (26.3910°S 153.0957°E) on a low hill near the town.

=== Coastal features ===
There are a number of headlands, lookouts, bays, and other coastal features along the Noosa Heads coastline, many of them on the coastal walking track through the national park, including (from north to south):

- Noosa Inlet, the mouth of the Noosa River (26.385°S 153.0758°E)
- Laguna Bay (26.3801°S 153.0853°E)
- Noosa Beach (26.3846°S 153.0867°E)
- Boiling Pot Lookout (26.3794°S 153.1010°E)
- Tea Tree Bay (26.3788°S 153.1046°E)
- Dolphin Point, a headland (26.3772°S 153.1077°E)
- Dolphin Point Lookout (26.3775°S 153.1081°E)
- Granite Bay (26.3777°S 153.1119°E)
- Fairy Pools, a rockhole (26.3766°S 153.1155°E)
- Noosa Head (also known as Low Bluff), a headland (26.3777°S 153.1177°E)
- Hell's Gates Lookout (26.3792°S 153.1194°E)
- Hells Gates (26.3797°S 153.1192°E)
- Alexandria Bay (26.3853°S 153.1176°E)
- Alexandria Beach (26.3856°S 153.1155°E)
- Roaring Cave (also known as the Blowhole) (26.3906°S 153.1176°E)
- Harrys Lookout (26.3920°S 153.1167°E)
- Devils Kitchen (26.3929°S 153.1175°E)
- Paradise Caves (26.3954°S 153.1169°E)

== History ==
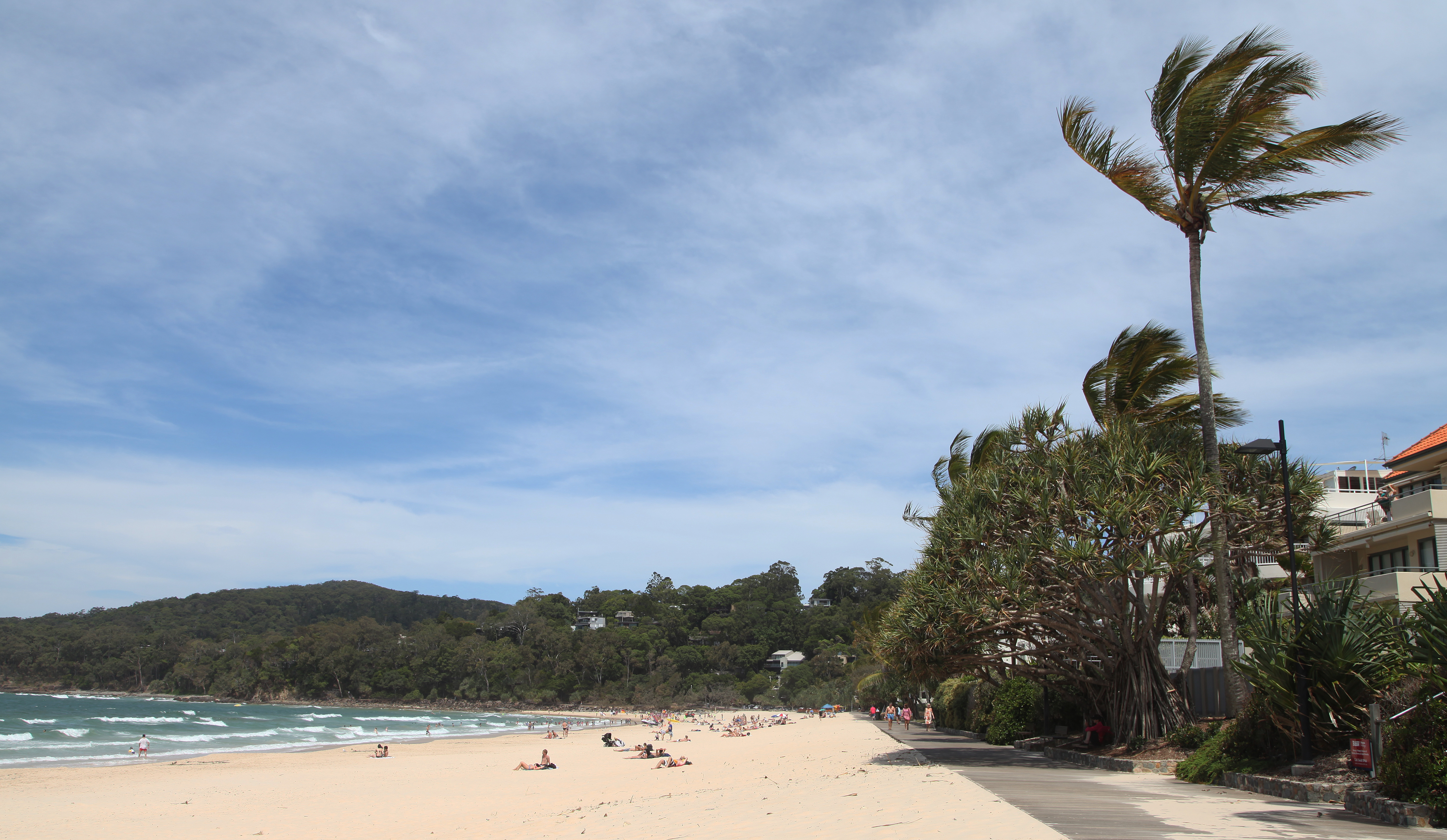
Beach of Noosa Heads

Gubbi Gubbi (Kabi Kabi, Cabbee, Carbi, Gabi Gabi) is an Australian Aboriginal language spoken on Gubbi Gubbi country. The Gubbi Gubbi language region includes the landscape within the local government boundaries of the Sunshine Coast Region and Gympie Region, particularly the towns of Caloundra, Noosa Heads, Gympie and extending north towards Maryborough and south to Caboolture.

It is widely stated that name Noosa is a corruption of the Kabi word nuthuru, meaning a ghost or a shadow. However, that is unlikely because a 1870 map of Noosa shows the Noosa River written as Nusa River, and a notice to mariners published on 3 September 1873 refers to Nusa Head and the Nusa River in Laguna Bay. Nusa is the Indonesian word for island, and the Noosa River contains Makepeace Island, Sheep Island and Goat Island. "Nusa Bay, or as it is better known, Lagoona Bay" is mentioned in a 1866 newspaper article and the locality of Nusa is also mentioned in a 1869 article.

The beach at Noosa Heads has remained a popular tourist attraction since the 1890s. The Shire's tourism exponentially grew shortly after the Second World War.

In the 19th century, Noosa's early wealth came from the timber and milling industries, with tourism developing in the late 1920s. In that decade, cafes and tourist accommodation was built along the beachfront.

Noosa Heads Surf Lifesaving Club was founded in 1927.

A fatal shark attack of a 22-year-old surfer was recorded at Noosa in 1961.

In 1988, Noosa was renamed Noosa Heads.

In 2009 as part of the Q150 celebrations, Noosa was announced as one of the Q150 Icons of Queensland for its role as a "location".

Between 2008 and 2013, Noosa Heads (and the rest of the Shire of Noosa) was within Sunshine Coast Region.

The local print newspaper was the Noosa News. Along with many other regional Australian newspapers owned by NewsCorp, the newspaper ceased print editions in June 2020 and became an online-only publication from 26 June 2020.

In May 2021, Noosa was named as the top tourism town in Queensland.

== Demographics ==
In the 2016 census, the suburb of Noosa Heads had a population of 4,484 people.

In the 2021 census, the suburb of Noosa Heads had a population of 5,120 people.

== Heritage listings ==
Noosa Heads has a number of heritage-listed sites, including:

- Halse Lodge, 17 Noosa Drive ( 26.3891°S 153.0923°E)

== Education ==
There are no schools in Noosa Heads. The nearest government primary and secondary schools are Sunshine Beach State School and Sunshine Beach State High School, both in neighbouring Sunshine Beach to the east.

== Amenities ==
The Noosa Shire Council operates a mobile library service which visits Lanyana Way at Noosa Junction.

There are two jetties, managed by the Noosa Shire Council:

- Woods Bay jetty at Claude Batten Drive (26.3869°S 153.0856°E)
- Ravenwood Drive jetty at Ravenwood Park (26.3892°S 153.0833°E)

== Attractions ==
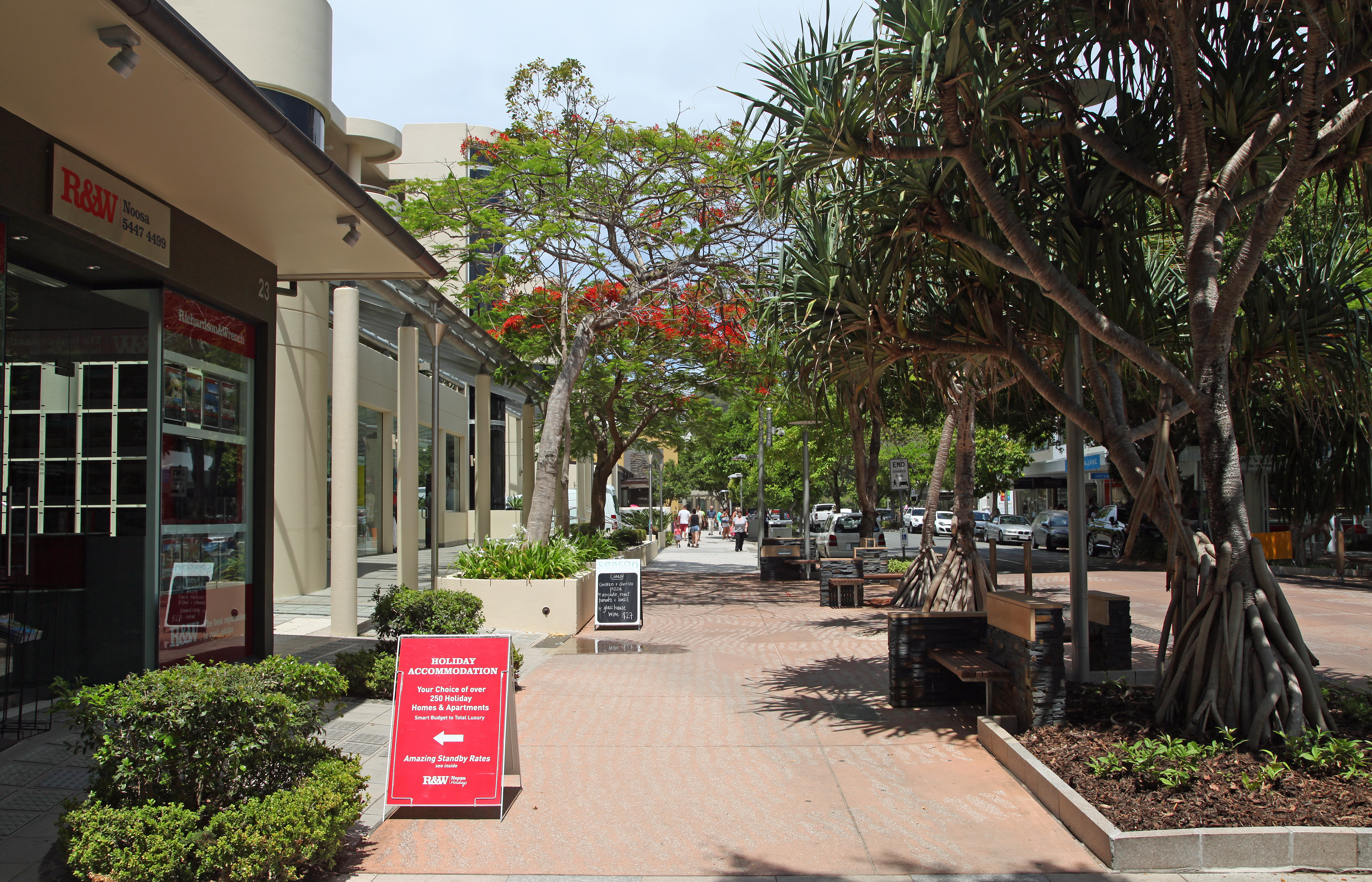
Hastings Street features boutique shopping

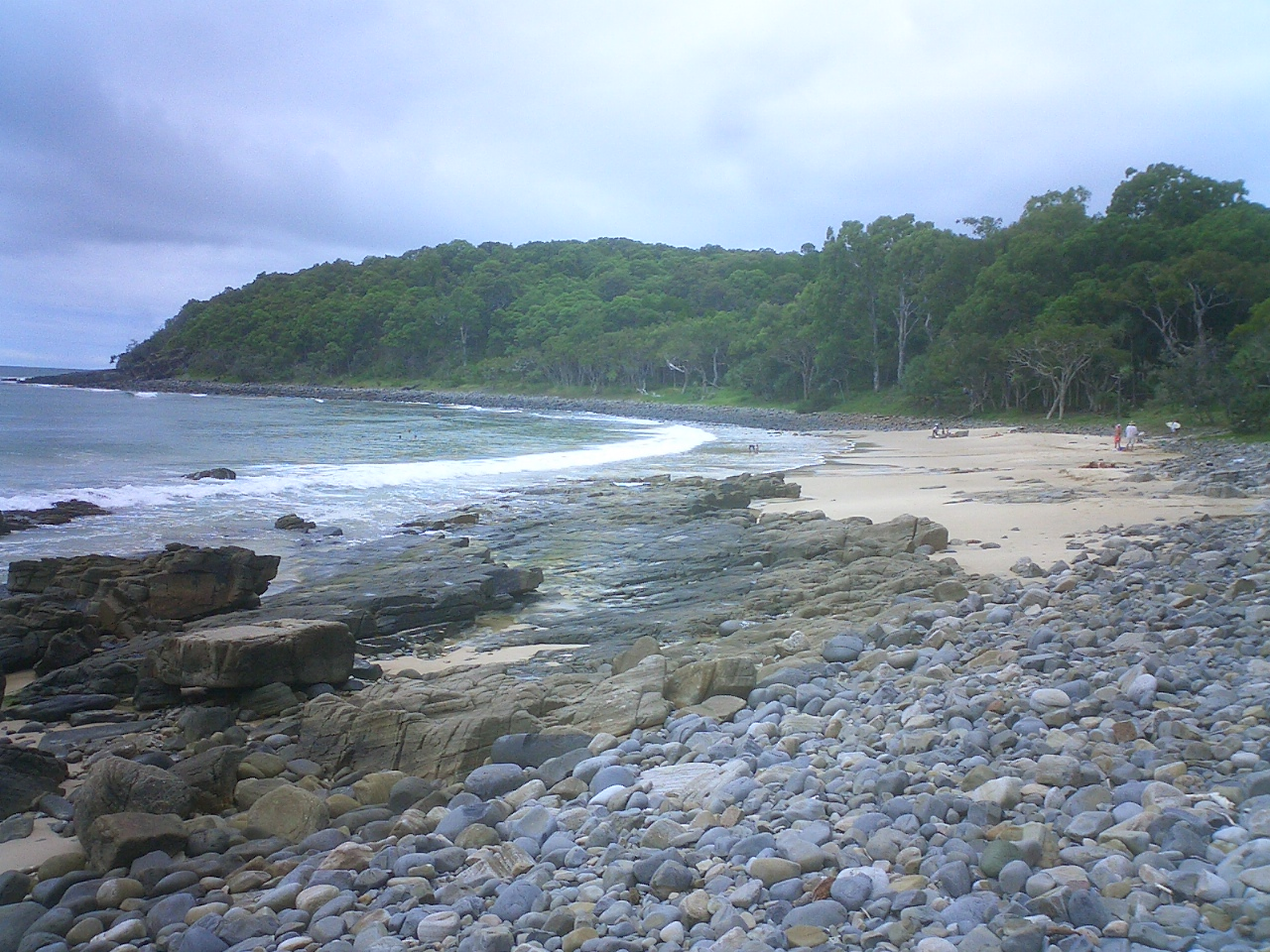
A beach on the headlands hike, coastal trail

Noosa Heads hosts a population of koalas, which are often seen in and around Noosa National Park. The koala population in Noosa is in decline. Native black and grey-headed flying foxes (tree pollinators and seed dispersal agents) can be heard in local trees if they are flowering or fruiting. Micro-bat species are also common and aid in insect control.

Noosa Lions Park is an open, grassed area which used as a staging area for several large community events including the Noosa Triathlon, Noosa Food and Wine Festival, Noosa Winter Festival and Noosa Classic Car Show.

To overcome severe beach erosion at Noosa's main beach a sand pumping system has been built. It operates when necessary during off peak hours, supplying sand via a pipeline built underneath the boardwalk.

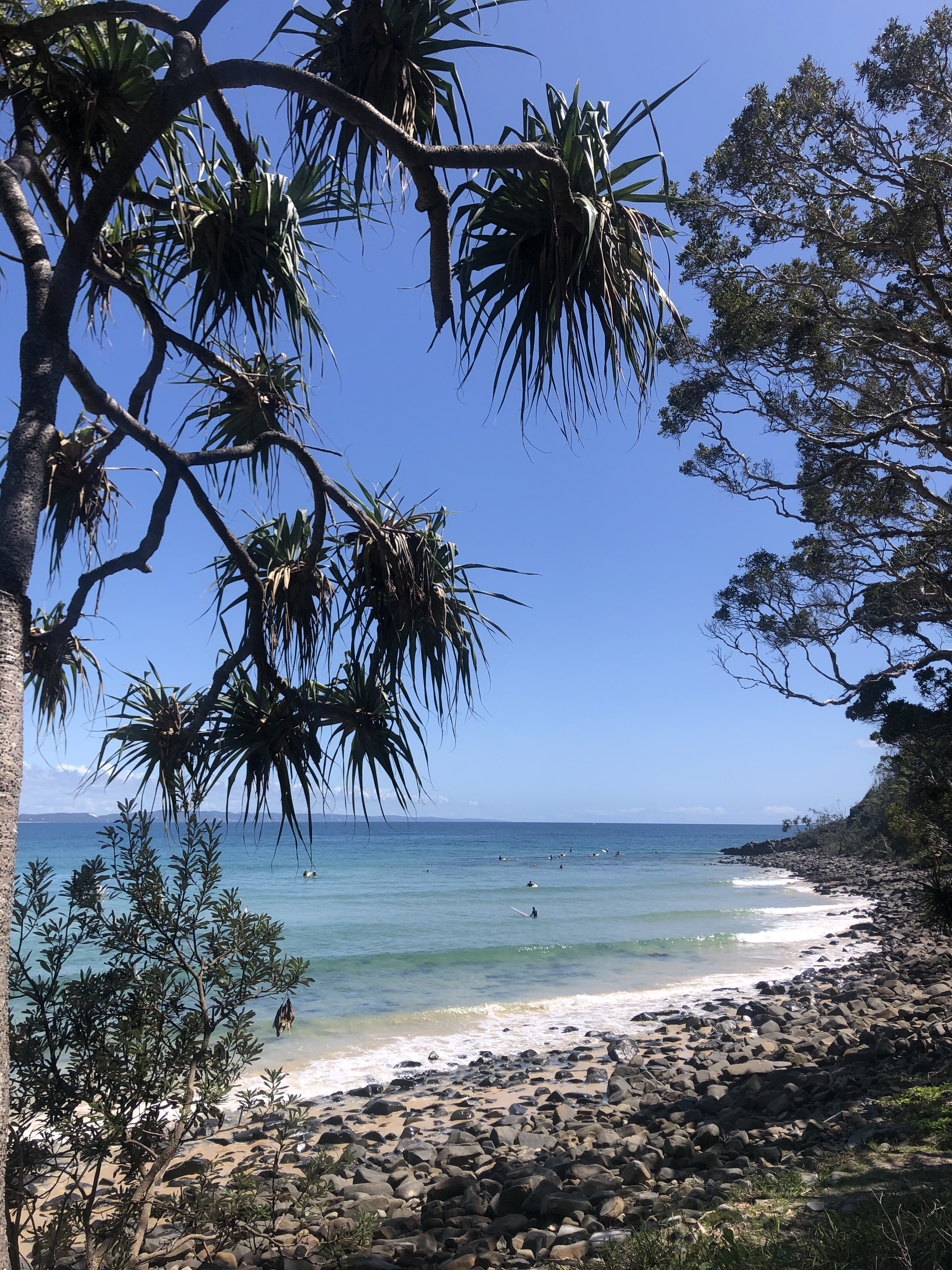
Local surfing spot in a cove along the Noosa headlands walk

Noosa Heads' main attraction is its beaches. Its main beach and its small bays around the headland are common surfing locations which are known on world surfing circuits. One of its major surfing contests involves the Noosa Festival of Surfing. This festival attracts large numbers of longboarders.

== Media ==
The local newspaper is the Noosa News, an online-only publication of NewsCorp.

== Transport ==
Noosa Heads is the tourist heart of Noosa district, with many restaurants and hotels. The main street is Hastings Street, which lies directly behind the seashore. Buses to elsewhere in the Sunshine Coast depart from Noosa Heads bus station. Free tourist shuttle buses operate during the Easter and Christmas peak periods, between the towns in Noosa Shire.

== Notable residents ==
- Bob Ansett – entrepreneur, actor and writer
