= Noosa National Park =

Protected area in Queensland, Australia

- IUCN category II (national park)
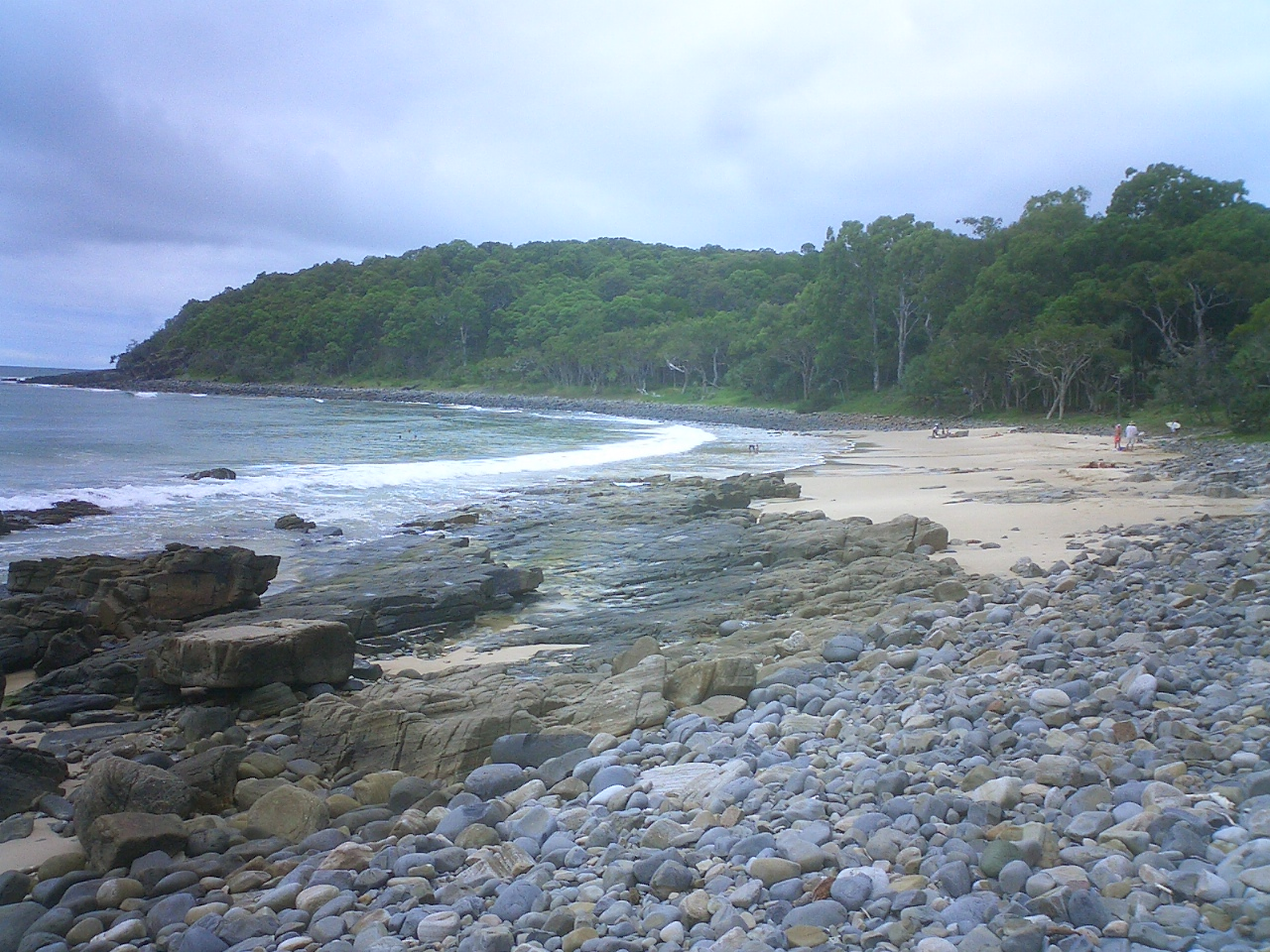
- A beach on the headlands coastal trail

- Location within Queensland
- Location: Queensland
- Coordinates: 26°23′04″S 153°06′46″E
- Area: 28.83 km^{2} (11.13 sq mi)
- Established: 1939
- Visitors: 2,041,000 (domestic visitors only) (in 2012)
- Governing body: Queensland Parks and Wildlife Service
- Website: Official website

Noosa National Park is a national park in Queensland, Australia, 121 km north of Brisbane. It is situated near Noosa Heads between the Pacific Ocean and the Sunshine Coast's northern area of urban development and extends southwards, past Lake Weyba to Coolum.

== Geography ==
The 4,000-hectare park is divided into four sections; Headland Section, Peregian Section, Emu Mountain Section and the East Weyba Section. Noosa National Park is the most popular national park in the country, with more than 1 million visits each year.

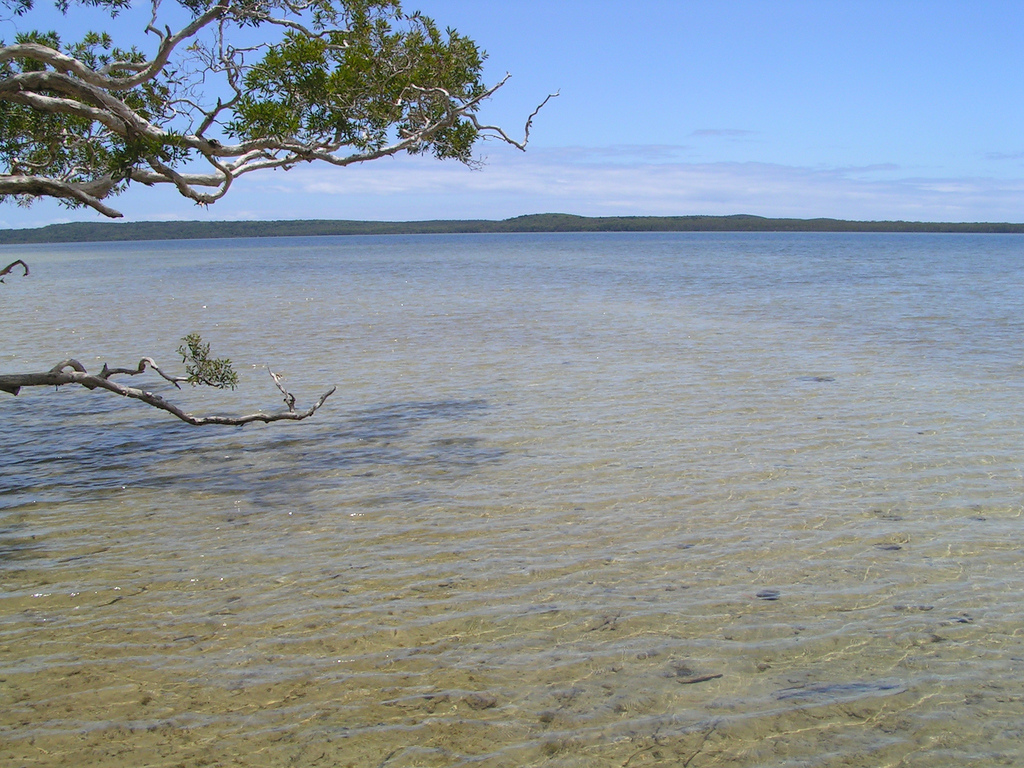
Lake Weyba

Several beaches in the park provide good locations for swimming. These beaches are not patrolled. Swimmers should be aware of strong currents at Alexandria Bay. The southern end of Alexandria Bay is unofficially clothing optional. Rockclimbing, fishing, surfing and snorkeling are other recreational activities undertaken in the park, while camping is banned.

== History ==
The land area of what is today part of Noosa National Park was formed by a series of landforms, including parabolic high dunes from the Pleistocene era, but also includes sandplains, that have continuously been forming since the Quaternary era. Nearby is Hell's Gate, which has been a sandstone cliff when it created the coves around 190 million years ago.

The early settlers of Noosa Heads set aside a reserve to protect the area in 1879. The reserve officially became a national park in 1939.

Advocates for the park's protection were active in the early 1960s when the Noosa Parks Association was formed at time when urban development was threatening the wilderness area. A management plan for the park was released in October 1999.

In 2003, an extra 300 hectares at Coolum were added to park.

== Flora ==
The Headlands Section of the park contains pockets of rainforest where hoop and kauri pines dominate. There are also areas of open eucalypt forest, wallum heaths, Pandanus palms and grasslands. The Peregian Section is known for its wildflowers which blossom in spring, particularly the rare swamp orchid and Christmas bells.

== Fauna ==
A population of koalas is found in the park, as are mammal species such as the short-nosed bandicoot, common ringtail possum, brushtail possum. Birds such as the eastern ground parrot, glossy black cockatoo, eastern yellow robin, rufous fantail, satin bowerbird and crimson rosella are all found in the park's forests. Headlands in the park are a popular place to watch migrating humpback whales. Noosa National Park is also home to endangered species such as the red goshawk.

== Walking tracks ==
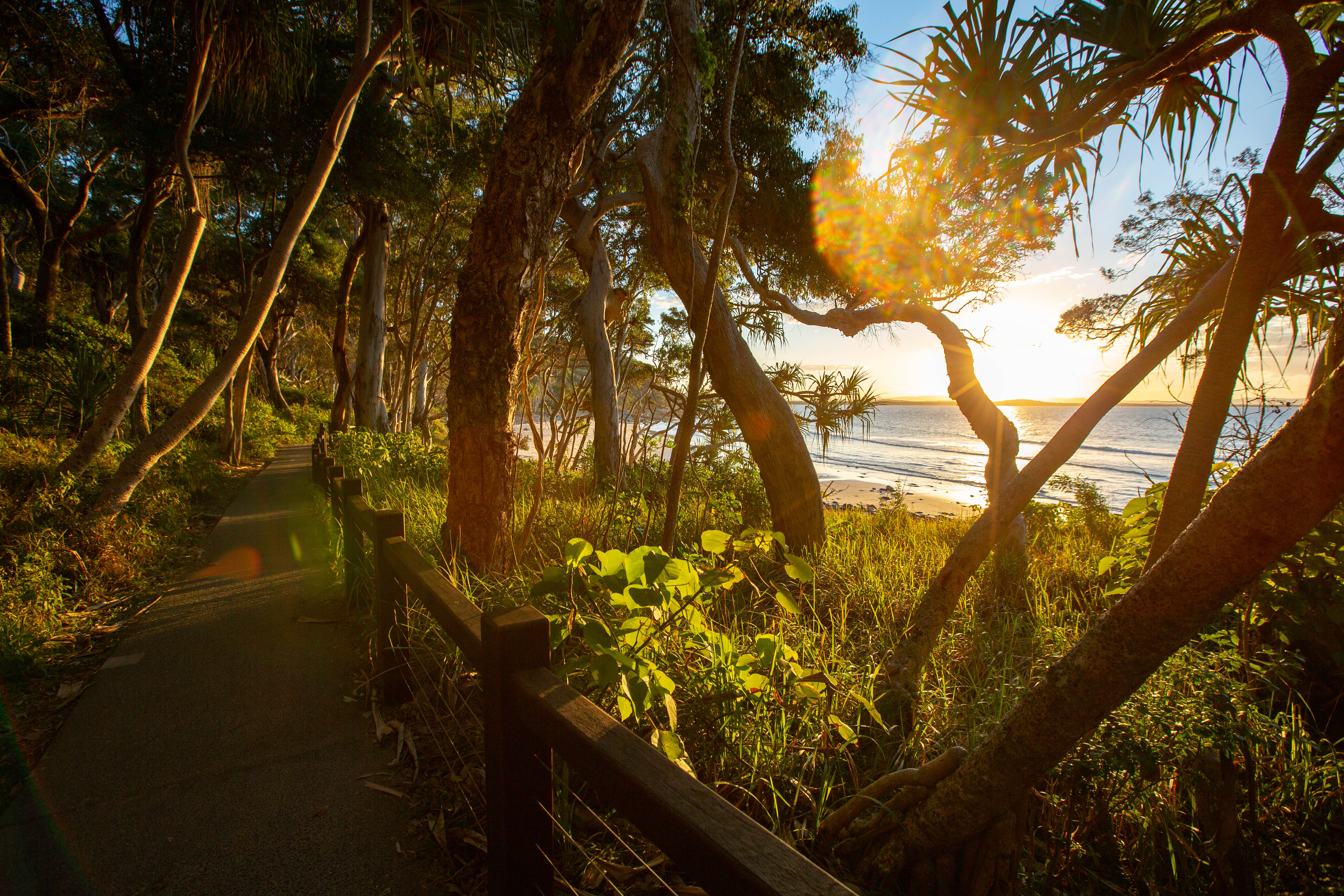
Walking track in Noosa National park Australia

The park contains eight formal walking tracks, with the longest being 10.8 km. Noosa Hill, at 147 m, is the highest point in the park and is accessible via one of the walking tracks. Another track leads to Hell's Gate, one of the park's headlands, and continues to Sunshine Beach. Known as the Coastal Walk, it is the most traversed trail in Queensland. A 1-km oceanway connects Noosa Main Beach with the park's Headland Section.

== See also ==
- Great Sandy National Park
- Noosa Biosphere Reserve
- Protected areas of Queensland
