= Sunshine Beach, Queensland =

Sunshine Beach
- Town
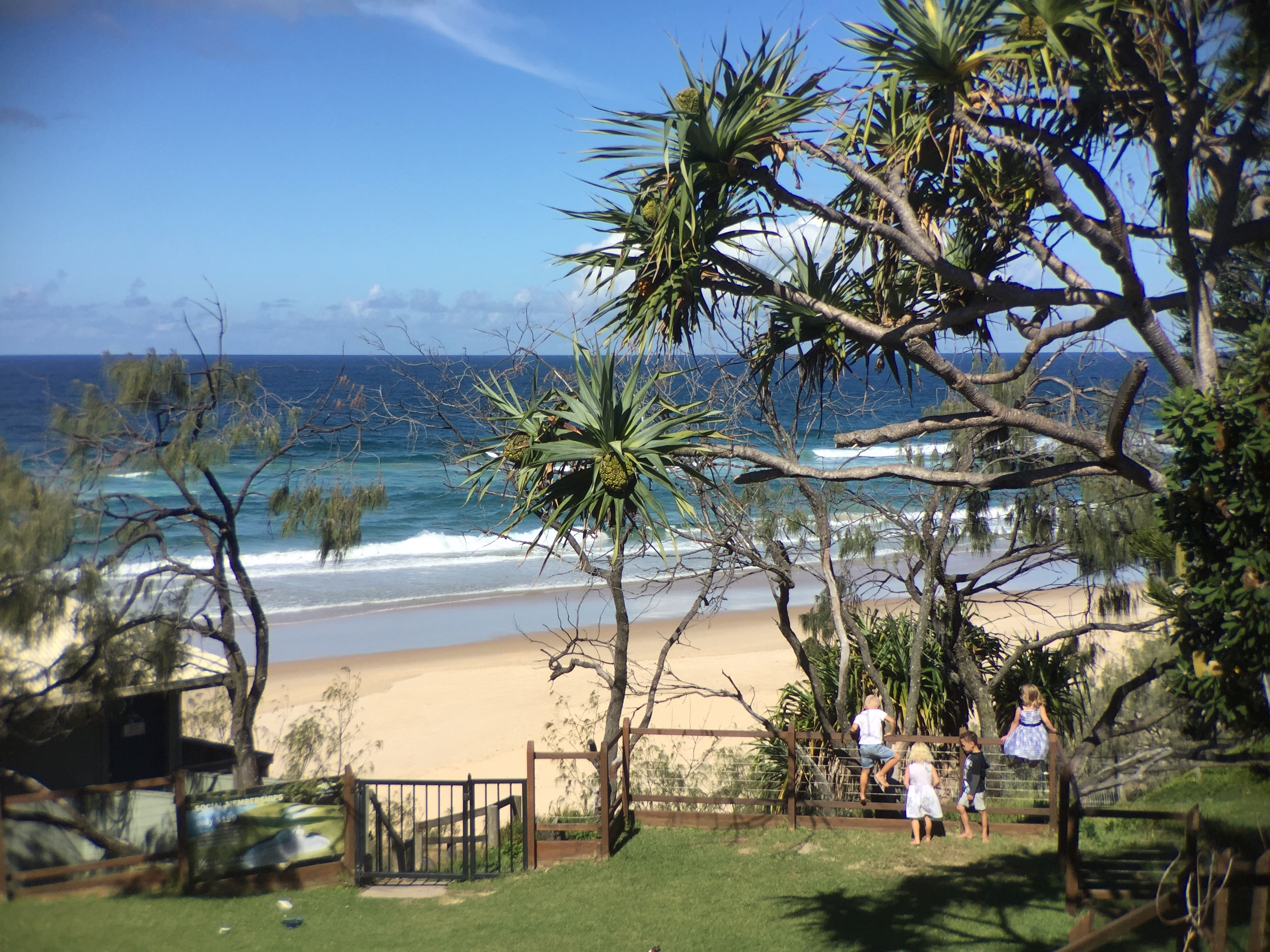
- Sunshine Beach, 2016

- Interactive map of Sunshine Beach
- Coordinates: 26.4072°S 153.1055°E
- Country: Australia
- State: Queensland
- City: Noosa Heads
- LGA: Shire of Noosa
- Location: 1.8 km (1.1 mi) SE of Noosa Heads; 9.2 km (5.7 mi) ESE of Tewantin; 137 km (85 mi) N of Brisbane

Government
  - State electorate: Noosa
  - Federal division: Wide Bay

Area
  - Total: 1.9 km^{2} (0.73 sq mi)

Population
  - Total: 2,480 (2021 census)
  - Density: 1,310/km^{2} (3,380/sq mi)
- Time zone: UTC+10:00 (AEST)
- Postcode: 4567
Localities around Sunshine Beach
Noosa Heads	Noosa Heads	Coral Sea
Noosa Heads	Sunshine Beach	Coral Sea
Noosa Heads	Sunrise Beach	Coral Sea

Sunshine Beach is a coastal town and suburb in the Shire of Noosa, Queensland, Australia. In the 2021 census, the suburb of Sunshine Beach had a population of 2,480 people.

== History ==
The area south of Noosa Headlands was formerly known as Golden Beach but was rarely visited before the 1920s. In 1928, Thomas Marcus Burke gained land there in exchange for building roads and bridges from Tewantin. After World War II it was marketed by his son, Marcus, as Sunshine Beach.

Sunshine Beach State School opened on 25 January 1982.

St Andrew's Anglican Church was built in 1990. It was designed by Hurst & Harris to seat 150 people. It was built from coralite limestone at a cost of $350,000.

Saint Thomas More Primary School is a Roman Catholic Primary school. It was opened by the Marist Brothers on Tuesday 30 January 1990 with an initial enrolment of 92 children with Brother Mark May as the first principal.

Sunshine Beach State High School opened on 1 January 1992.

St Thomas More's Catholic Church was built in 1994.

Sunshine Beach Uniting Church was built from concrete blocks in 1997.

Noosa Flexible Learning Centre opened on 23 January 2006.

Although currently and historically within the Shire of Noosa, between 2008 and 2013, the entire Shire of Noosa including Sunshine Beach was within the Sunshine Coast Region.

== Demographics ==
In the 2016 census, the suburb of Sunshine Beach had a population of 2,460 people.

In the 2021 census, the suburb of Sunshine Beach had a population of 2,480 people.

== Education ==
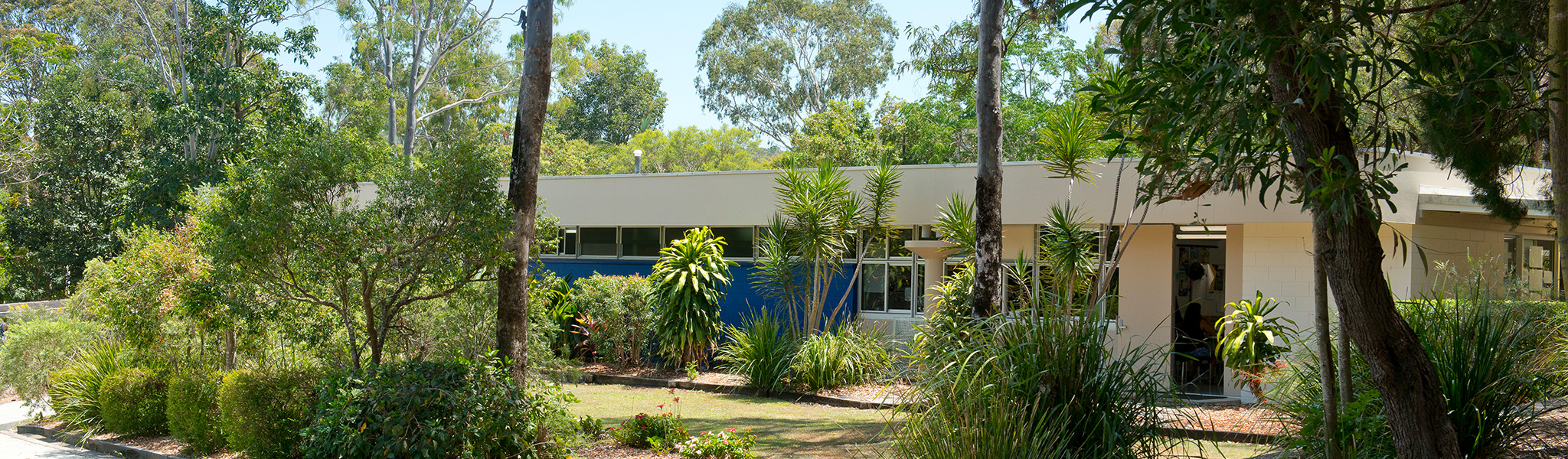
Sunshine Beach State School, 2023

Sunshine Beach State School is a government primary (Prep–6) school for boys and girls at David Low Way (26.4027°S 153.1023°E). In 2018, the school had an enrolment of 799 students with 52 teachers (47 full-time equivalent) and 25 non-teaching staff (18 full-time equivalent). It includes a special education program.

St Thomas More Primary School is a Catholic primary (Prep–6) school for boys and girls on Ben Lexcen Drive (26.4059°S 153.1017°E). It is part of The Noosa District Roman Catholic Parish. It is staffed by the Brisbane Catholic Education Centre and operates in the Marist tradition. In 2018, the school had an enrolment of 765 students with 50 teachers (41 full-time equivalent) and 37 non-teaching staff (21 full-time equivalent).

Montessori Noosa is a private primary (Prep–5) school for boys and girls at 2 Bicentennial Drive (26.4050°S 153.0992°E). In 2018, the school had an enrolment of 40 students with 3 teachers and 2 non-teaching staff (1 full-time equivalent).

Sunshine Beach State High School is a government secondary (7–12) school for boys and girls at 45 Ben Lexcen Drive (26.4104°S 153.1007°E). In 2018, the school had an enrolment of 1,401 students with 112 teachers (103 full-time equivalent) and 50 non-teaching staff (39 full-time equivalent). It includes a special education program.

Noosa Flexible Learning Centre is a Catholic secondary (7–12) school for boys and girls at 2 Girraween Court (26.4031°S 153.1007°E). In 2018, the school had an enrolment of 88 students with 8 teachers (6 full-time equivalent) and 12 non-teaching staff (10 full-time equivalent).

== Amenities ==
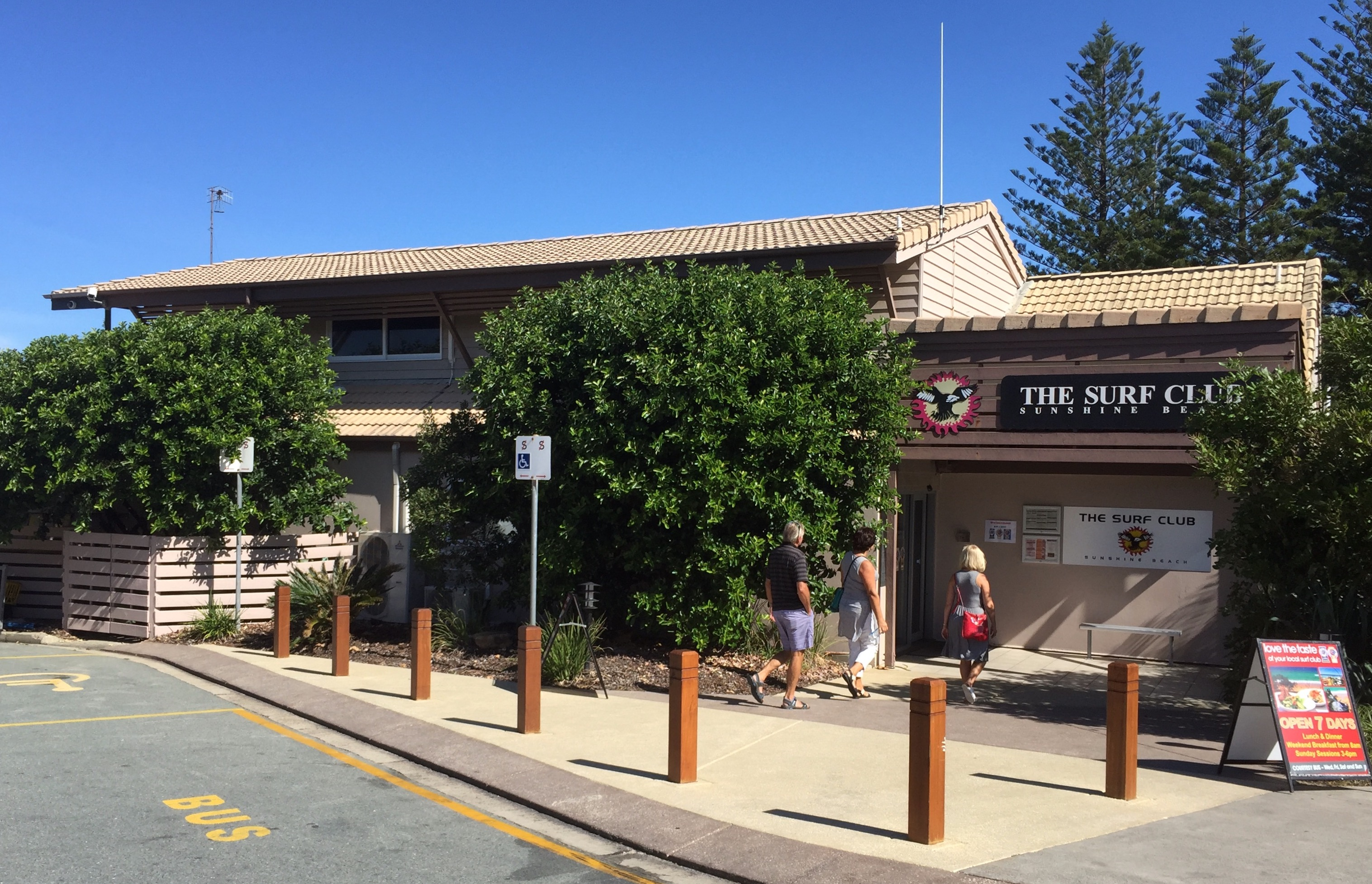
Sunshine Beach Surf Life Saving Club, 2016

Noosa Aquatic Centre is at 6 Girraween Court (26.4074°S 153.0982°E). It has swimming pools and gym facilities with associated classes and group fitness sessions.

Sunshine Beach Surf Lifesaving Club is off the bend along the beachfront on the corner of Dule St and Belmore Terrace, and is fringed by Ed Webb Park at its rear. (26.40620°S 153.11196°E). Volunteers from the club patrol the beach to protect the public while swimming and surfing.

Sunshine Beach Surf Life Saving Club began patrols in the season of 1980/81 making it one of the youngest surf life saving clubs in Australia.

There are a number of churches in Sunshine Beach:

- St Andrew's Anglican Church, Bicentennial Drive (26.403484°S 153.1°E)
- St Thomas More's Catholic Church, 75 Ben Lexcen Drive (26.404844°S 153.101°E)
- Sunshine Beach Uniting Church, 6 Grasstree Court (26.411835°S 153.0985°E)
