= Conospermum galeatum =

Conservation status
- Critically endangered (EPBC Act)

Scientific classification
- Kingdom: Plantae
- Clade: Tracheophytes
- Clade: Angiosperms
- Clade: Eudicots
- Order: Proteales
- Family: Proteaceae
- Genus: Conospermum
- Species: C. galeatum

Binomial name
- Conospermum galeatum E.M.Benn.

Species of shrub native to Australia

Conospermum galeatum is a species of flowering plant in the family Proteaceae and is endemic to the south-west of Western Australia. It is an open shrub with threadlike, channelled leaves, and panicles of spikes of woolly white flowers with blue bracteoles.

== Description ==
Conospermum galeatum is an open shrub that typically grows to a height of up to 70 cm (28 in). It has thread-like, curved, channelled leaves 40–50 mm (1.6–2.0 in) long and about 0.5 mm (0.020 in) wide. The flowers are woolly and white, arranged a panicle of spikes on a peduncle 160–200 mm (6.3–7.9 in) long, the perianth forming a tube 5–8 mm (0.20–0.31 in) long. The bracteoles are egg-shaped, 2.5–3.0 mm (0.098–0.118 in) long and 2–3 mm (0.079–0.118 in) wide and have woolly hairs. The upper lip of the perianth is egg-shaped, 1.0–1.5 mm (0.039–0.059 in) long, about 2 mm (0.079 in) wide, blue and glabrous, the lower lip joined for about 1 mm (0.039 in) with oblong lobes 0.75–1.0 mm (0.030–0.039 in) long. Flowering occurs from August to September.

== Taxonomy ==
Conospermum galeatum was collected near Kellerberrin 1897 and again in 1901 at the same location. The species was first formally described in 1995 by Eleanor Marion Bennett in the Flora of Australia from specimens collected in 1929 between Bruce Rock and Narembeen by William Blackall. The specific epithet (galeatum) means 'helmeted', and possibly refers to the upper lip of the perianth.

== Distribution and habitat ==
This species of Conospermum grows in deep sand, and is only known from three subpopulations at two locations about 25 km (16 mi) apart, one near Quairading and the other south of Tammin in the Avon Wheatbelt bioregion of south-western Western Australia, where it grows with Banksia prionotes and Xylomelum angustifolium.

== Conservation status ==
Conospermum galeatum is listed as "critically endangered" under the Australian Government Environment Protection and Biodiversity Conservation Act 1999 and an Interim Recovery Plan has been prepared.
