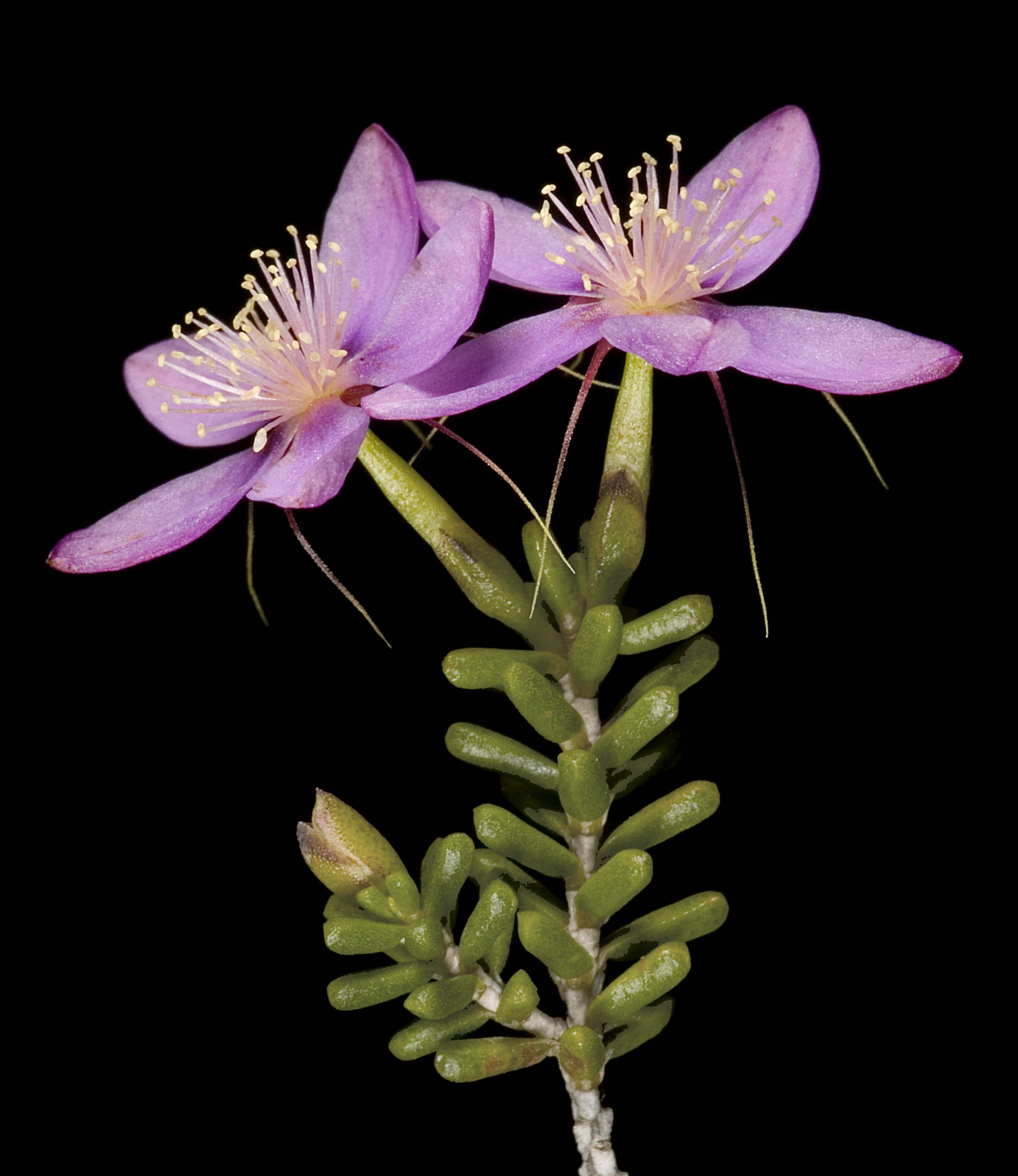

Scientific classification
- Kingdom: Plantae
- Clade: Tracheophytes
- Clade: Angiosperms
- Clade: Eudicots
- Clade: Rosids
- Order: Myrtales
- Family: Myrtaceae
- Genus: Calytrix
- Species: C. oldfieldii

Binomial name
- Calytrix oldfieldii Benth.

Synonyms
- Calycothrix oldfieldii (Benth.) F.Muell.; Calythrix oldfieldii Benth.orth. var.

= Calytrix oldfieldii =

Species of flowering plant

Calytrix oldfieldii is a species of flowering plant in the myrtle family Myrtaceae and is endemic to the south-west of Western Australia. It is a glabrous shrub with linear, oblong or egg-shaped leaves and mauve, pink, red, magenta or violet flowers with about 50 to 75 yellow stamens in several rows.

== Description ==
Calytrix oldfieldii is a glabrous shrub that typically grows to a height of 0.35–1 m (1 ft 2 in – 3 ft 3 in). Its leaves are linear, oblong or egg-shaped, 1.5–3.5 mm (0.059–0.138 in) long and 1.0–1.5 mm (0.039–0.059 in) wide on a petiole 0.1–0.75 mm (0.0039–0.0295 in) long. There are no stipules at the base of the petiole. The flowers are borne on an elliptic or funnel-shaped peduncle 4.75–6.5 mm (0.187–0.256 in) long with egg-shaped lobes 2.25–3.75 mm (0.089–0.148 in) long. The floral tube is spindle-shaped, 7–10 mm (0.28–0.39 in) long and has 10 ribs. The sepals are fused at the base, with broadly elliptic to egg-shaped lobes 1.0–1.75 mm (0.039–0.069 in) long and 1.5–2.25 mm (0.059–0.089 in) wide with an awn up to 11 mm (0.43 in) long. The petals are mauve, pink, red, magenta or violet, elliptic to egg-shaped, mostly 7.5–9 mm (0.30–0.35 in) long and 2.5–4.25 mm (0.098–0.167 in) wide, and there are about 50 to 75 yellow stamens in mostly three rows. Flowering mostly occurs from April to November.

== Taxonomy ==
Calytrix oldfieldii was first formally described in 1867 by George Bentham in his Flora Australiensis from specimens collected near the Hutt River by Augustus Oldfield. The specific epithet (oldfieldii) honours the collector of the type specimens.

== Distribution and habitat ==
This species of Calytrix grows in low, open heath in gravel or sand, or in tall heath with Xylomelum in sandy clay and in winter-wet areas from the Kalbarri district to the Eneabba district, in the Avon Wheatbelt, Geraldton Sandplains and Yalgoo bioregions of south-western Western Australia.

== Conservation status ==
Calytrix oldfieldii is listed as "not threatened" by the Government of Western Australia Department of Biodiversity, Conservation and Attractions.
