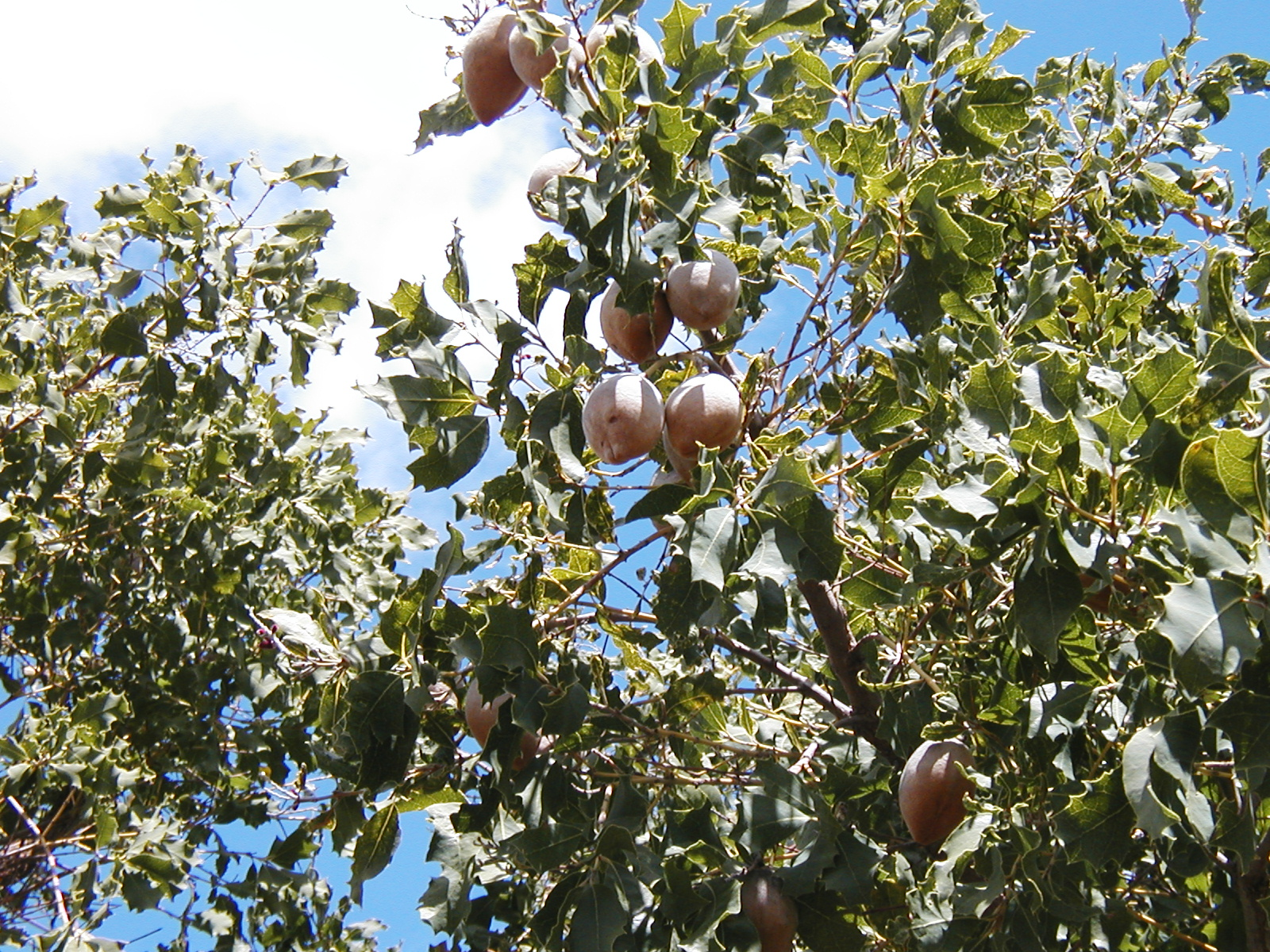

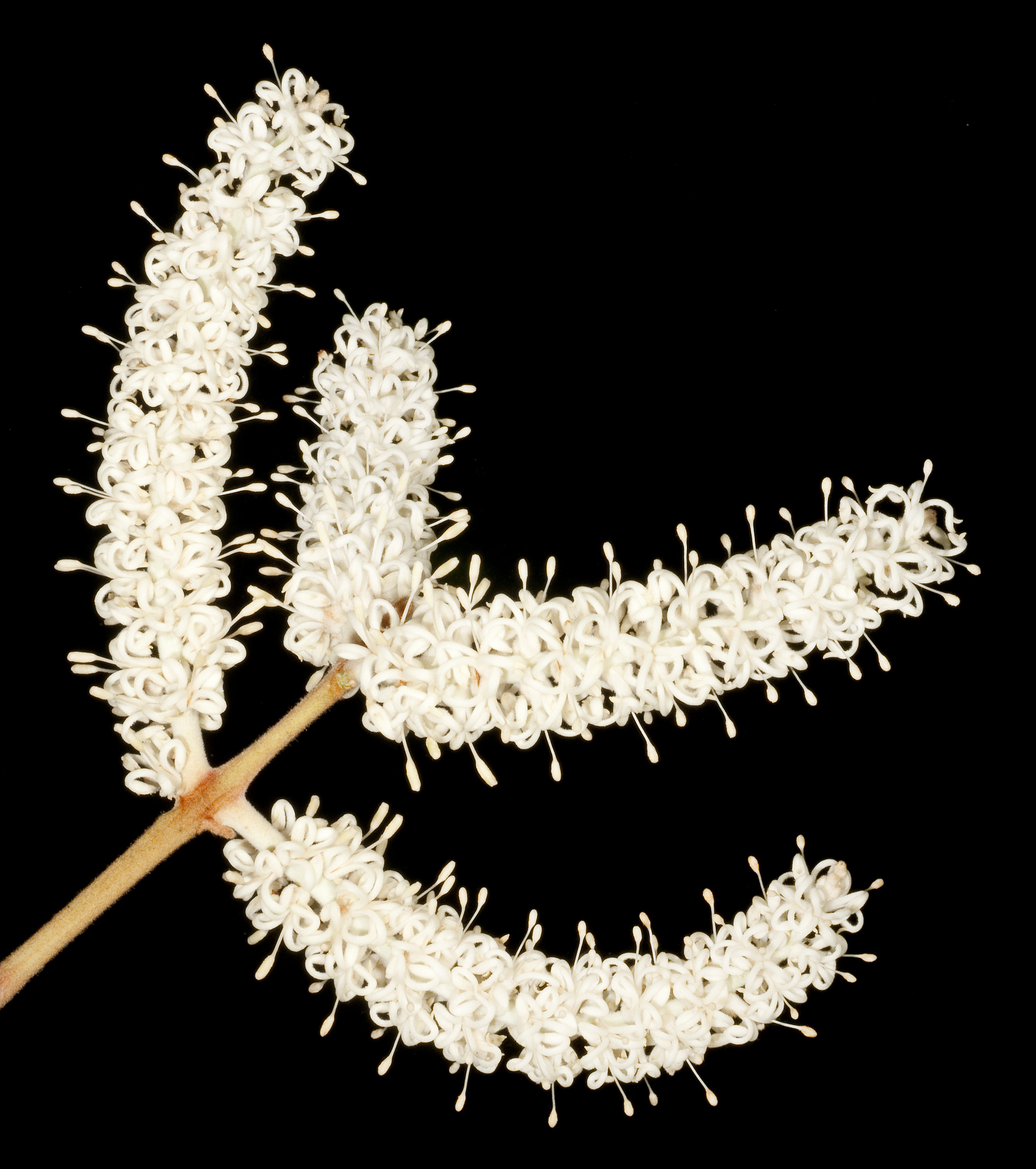

Scientific classification
- Kingdom: Plantae
- Clade: Tracheophytes
- Clade: Angiosperms
- Clade: Eudicots
- Order: Proteales
- Family: Proteaceae
- Genus: Xylomelum
- Species: X. occidentale

Binomial name
- Xylomelum occidentale R.Br.

= Xylomelum occidentale =

Western woody pear

Species of tree endemic to Western Australia

Xylomelum occidentale, commonly known as the western woody pear, is a tree species in the family Proteaceae. It is endemic to Western Australia.

== Taxonomy ==
The names for the plant used by Noongar peoples are danja, dumbung or koongal. It was first described by Robert Brown in 1830. The species name is derived from the Latin adjective occidentalis, meaning 'western'.

== Description ==
The tree or shrub typically grows to a height of 2 to 8 metres (6 ft 7 in to 26 ft 3 in) and has epicormic buds. It blooms between December and February producing cream white flowers. The surface of the flower is finely covered in silky hairs, the colour is a sulphurous yellow, they appear on spikes at the end of its branches. The fruit closely resembles a 'pear', those of genus Pyrus, are over 3 inches (76 mm) long, 1.75 inches (44 mm) inches wide, and deeply split along one edge after ripening. The margins of the leaves are spiny. The bark is greyish to black, finely cracked, and persists on the tree.

== Distribution ==
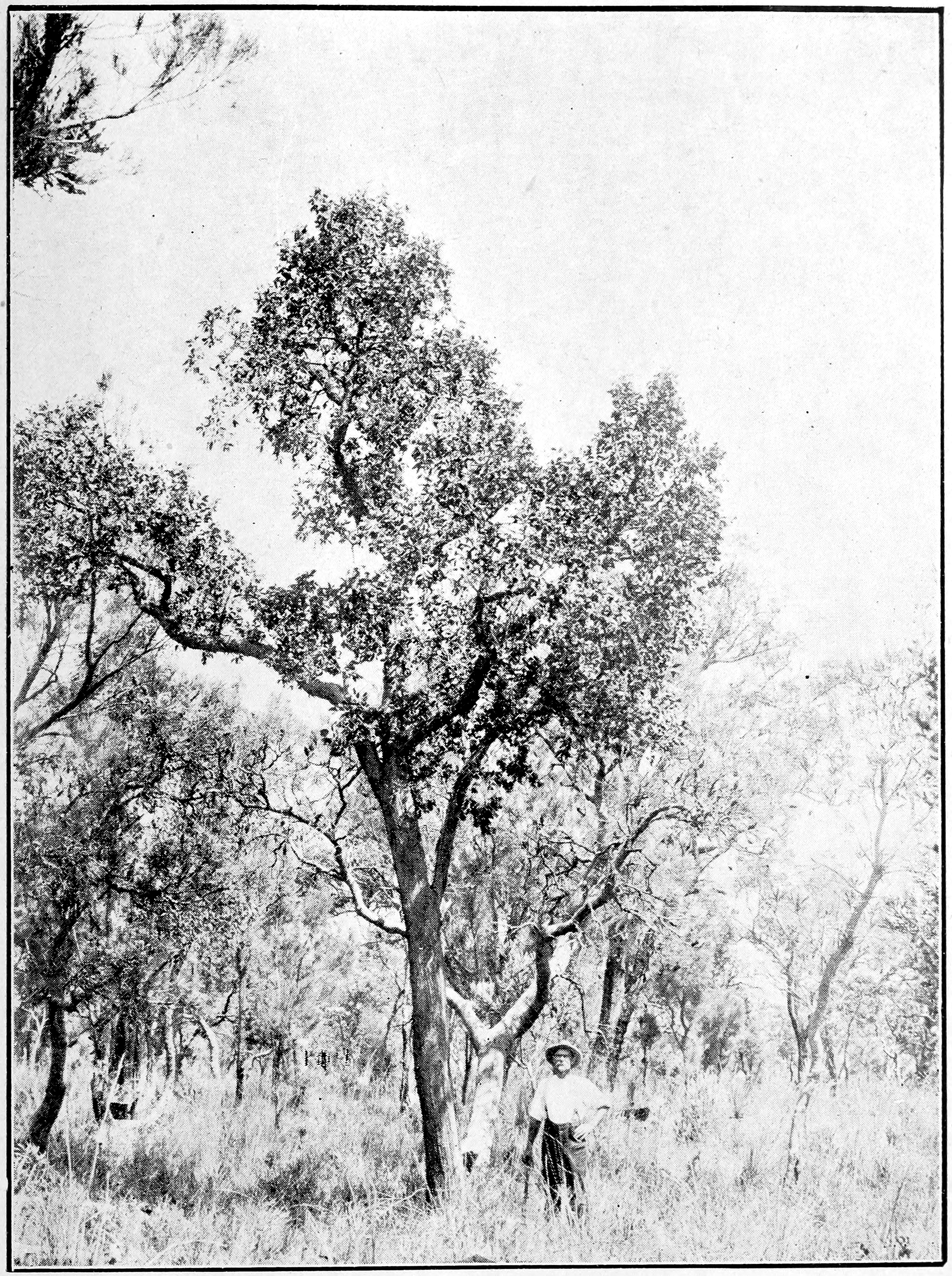
Tree with man standing at right, with an axe, circa 1920

It is found in the South West, Peel and Swan Coastal Plain regions of Western Australia where it grows in sandy soils. The species has broader leaves than its sister Xylomelum angustifolium, found to the east, although the fruit is similar.
