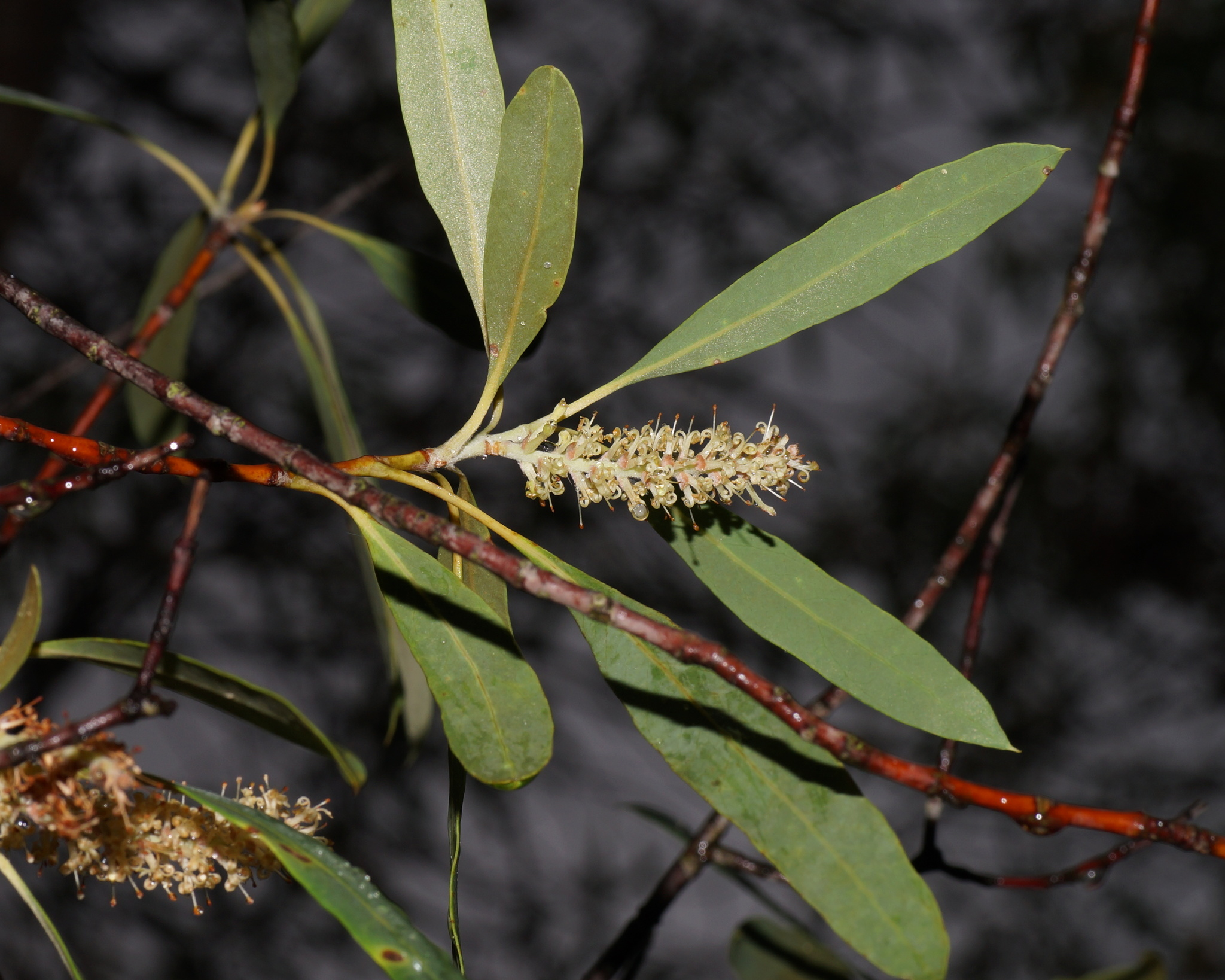
- Near Nandi

Scientific classification
- Kingdom: Plantae
- Clade: Tracheophytes
- Clade: Angiosperms
- Clade: Eudicots
- Order: Proteales
- Family: Proteaceae
- Genus: Xylomelum
- Species: X. cunninghamianum

Binomial name
- Xylomelum cunninghamianum Foreman

= Xylomelum cunninghamianum =

Species of tree endemic to Australia

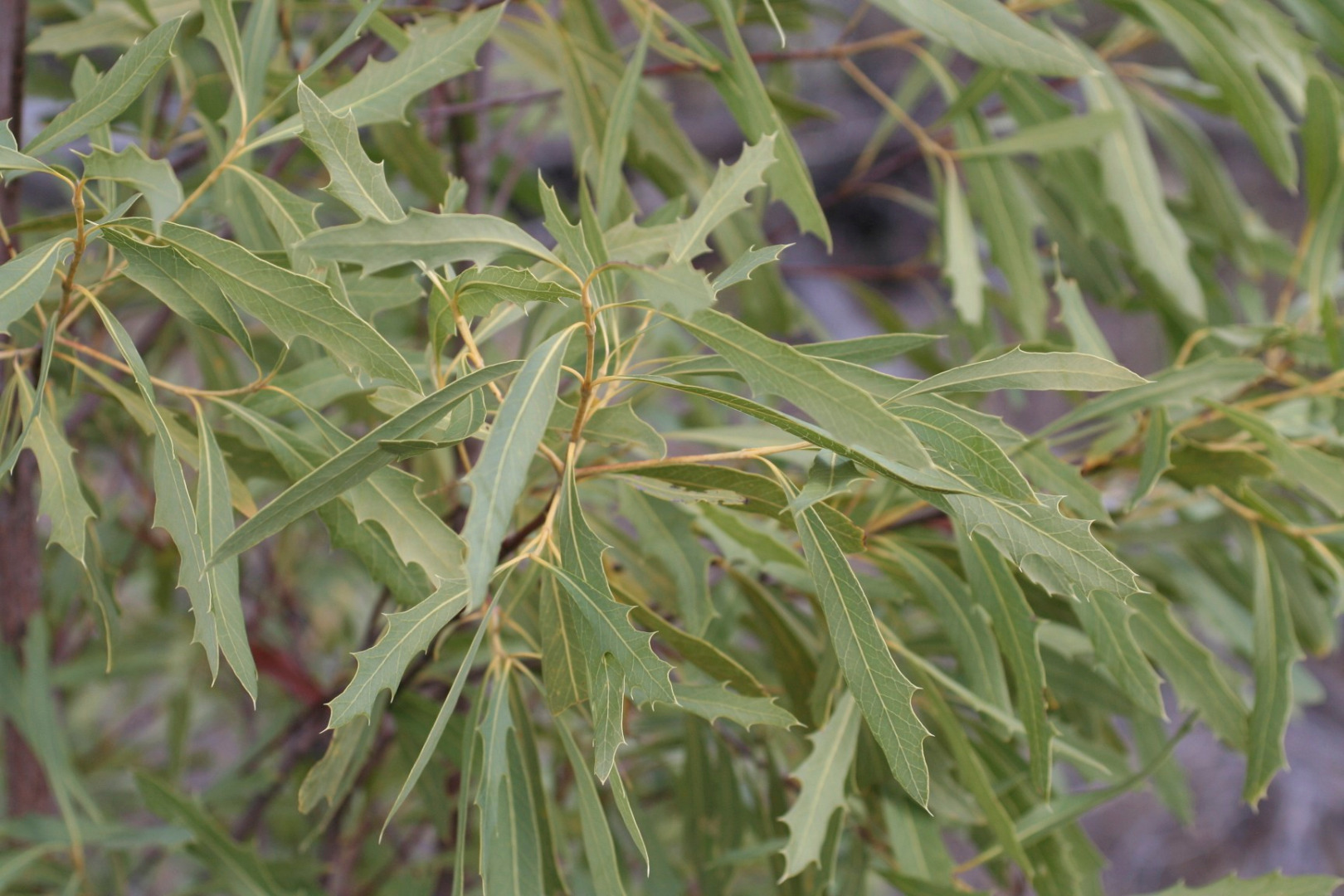
Juvenile foliage in Wondul Range National Park

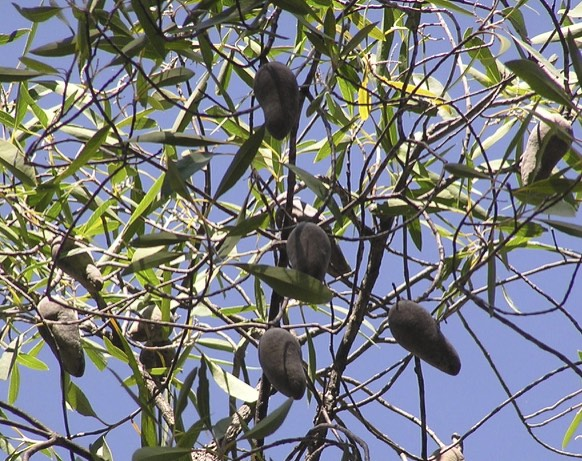
Fruit in Carnarvon Park

Xylomelum cunninghamianum is a species of flowering plant in the family Proteaceae and is endemic to eastern Australia. It is a shrub or small tree with narrow elliptic to lance-shaped leaves with toothed edges when young, groups of flowers covered with brownish hairs and oval fruit densely covered with velvety rust-coloured to grey hair.

== Description ==
Xylomelum cunninghamianum is a shrub or small tree that typically grows to a height of 12 m (39 ft) with its new growth covered with short, brownish hair. The leaves are narrow elliptic to lance-shaped with a pointed tip, 80–120 mm (3.1–4.7 in) long and 15–20 mm (0.59–0.79 in) wide. Its juvenile leaves are 80–150 mm (3.1–5.9 in) long and 20–30 mm (0.79–1.18 in) wide with up to five large teeth on each side. The flowers are arranged on spikes 30–40 mm (1.2–1.6 in) long, each flower 8–10 mm (0.31–0.39 in) long and covered with short brown hairs. Flowering occurs from February to May and the fruit is an oval follicle 60–90 mm (2.4–3.5 in) long and 30–45 mm (1.2–1.8 in) wide covered with velvety rust-coloured to grey hair. The seeds are pale brown, 59–70 mm (2.3–2.8 in) long and 15–20 mm (0.59–0.79 in) wide.

This species differs from X. pyriforme by its more robust habit, and larger leaves, flowers and fruits.

== Taxonomy ==
Xylomelum cunninghamianum was first formally described in 1987 by Donald Bruce Foreman in the journal Muelleria from specimens he collected near Wallangra in 1985. The specific epithet (cunninghamianum) honours Allan Cunningham.

== Distribution and habitat ==
Xylomelum cunninghamianum grows in forest and woodland in sandy soil and is found in scattered population from the Blackdown Tableland National Park in inland south-eastern Queensland to the Coolatai-Wallangra area in north-eastern New South Wales.
