= Xylomelum benthamii =

Scientific classification
- Kingdom: Plantae
- Clade: Tracheophytes
- Clade: Angiosperms
- Clade: Eudicots
- Order: Proteales
- Family: Proteaceae
- Genus: Xylomelum
- Species: X. benthamii

Binomial name
- Xylomelum benthamii Orchard

Synonyms
- Xylomelum pyriforme var. salicinum Meisn.; Xylomelum salicinum (Meisn.) Benth.

Species of plant native to Queensland, Australia

Xylomelum benthamii is a plant in the woody pear genus of the family Proteaceae. It was formerly considered a variety of Xylomelum pyriforme. It is native to south-eastern Queensland, Australia, and was described from material collected on 25 June 1829 on the Brisbane River some 140 km (87 mi) north-west of what is now Brisbane, the state capital. It was mistakenly linked with the name Xylomelum salicinum (Meisn.) Benth., and was given the replacement name X. benthamii in 2007 by A.E. Orchard, with the specific epithet honouring botanist George Bentham.
