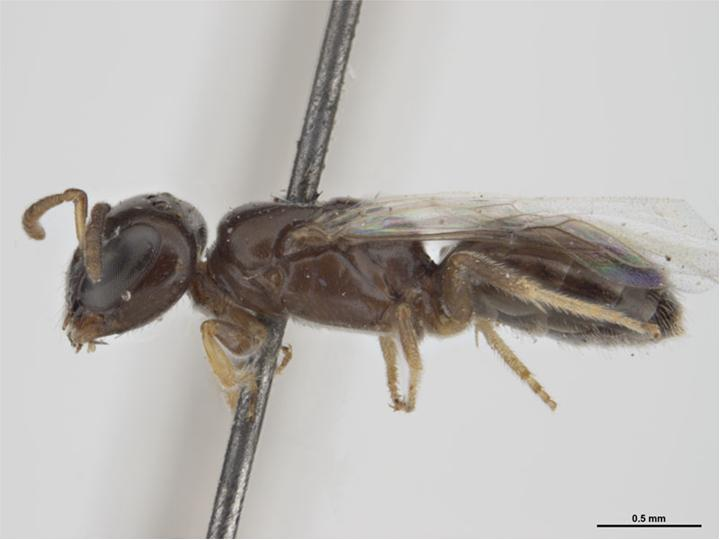
- Female

Scientific classification
- Kingdom: Animalia
- Phylum: Arthropoda
- Clade: Pancrustacea
- Class: Insecta
- Order: Hymenoptera
- Family: Colletidae
- Genus: Euryglossina
- Species: E. perkinsi

Binomial name
- Euryglossina perkinsi Michener, 1965

= Euryglossina perkinsi =

Species of bee

Euryglossina perkinsi, or Euryglossina (Euryglossella) perkinsi, is a species of bee in the family Colletidae and the subfamily Euryglossinae. It is endemic to Australia. It was described in 1965 by American entomologist Charles Duncan Michener.

== Distribution and habitat ==
The species occurs in eastern Australia. The type locality is Binna Burra, Lamington National Park, in south-east Queensland. Other published localities are Tamborine and Noosa.

== Behaviour ==
The adults are flying mellivores. Flowering plants visited by the bees include Angophora, Claoxylon and Eugenia species.

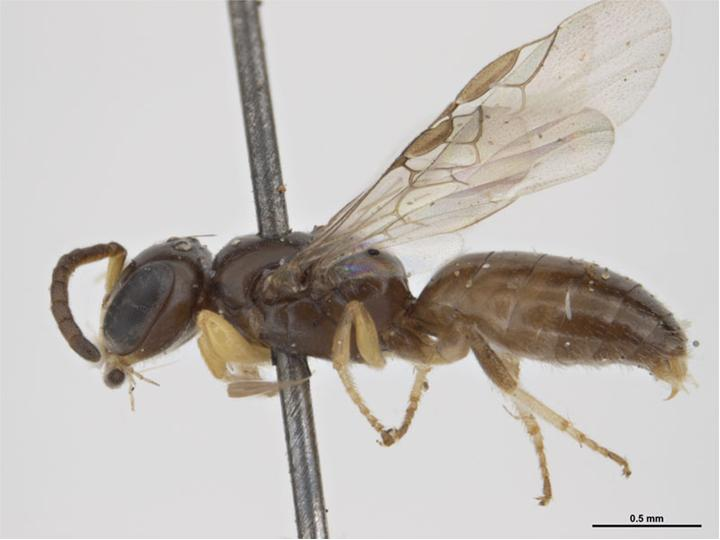
Male
