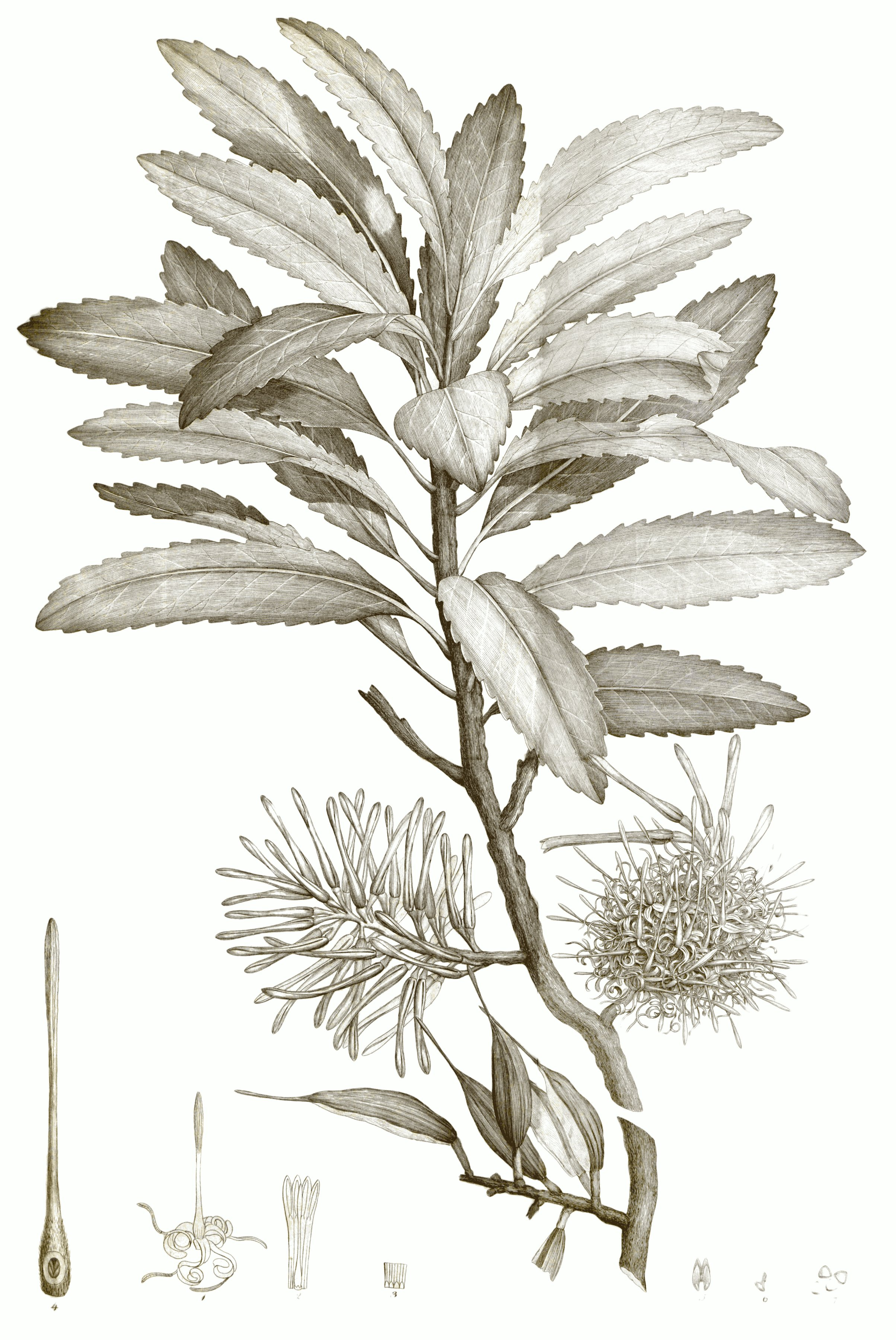
- Knightia excelsa

Scientific classification
- Kingdom: Plantae
- Clade: Tracheophytes
- Clade: Angiosperms
- Clade: Eudicots
- Order: Proteales
- Family: Proteaceae
- Subfamily: Grevilleoideae
- Tribe: Roupaleae
- Genus: Knightia; R.Br.

Type species
- Knightia excelsa R.Br.

Species
- See text.

Synonyms
- Rymandra Salisb. ex Knight; Sources: ING, UniProt, IPNI, GRIN

= Knightia (plant) =

Genus of plants endemic to New Zealand

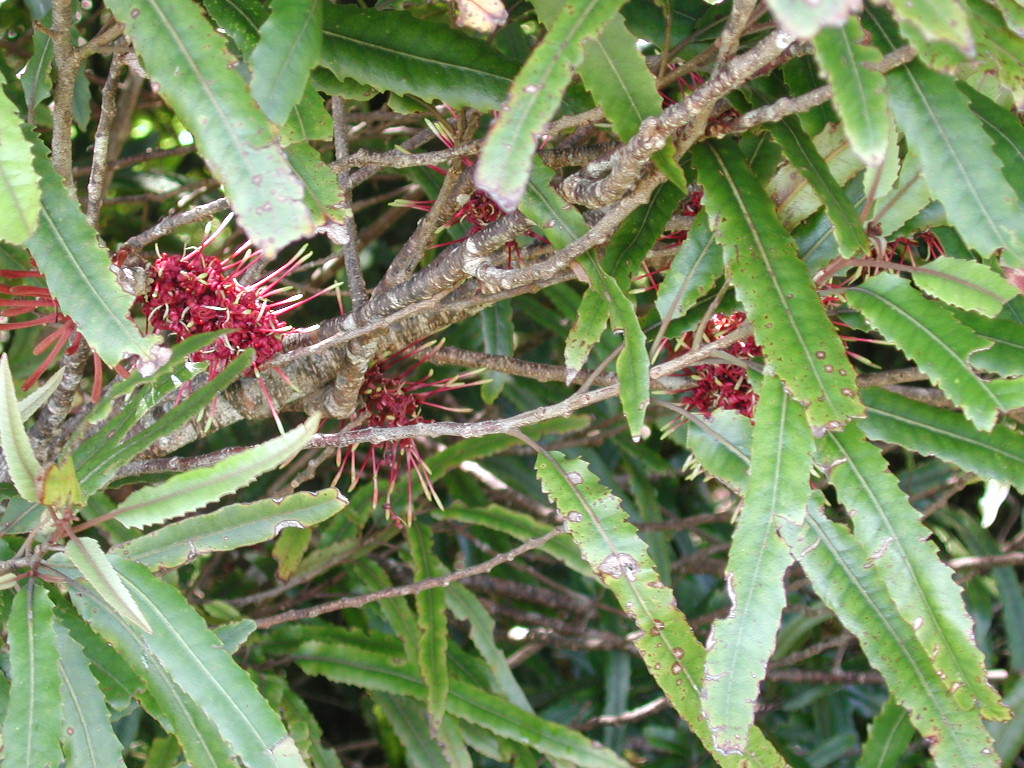
Foliage of K. excelsa

Knightia is a small genus of the family Proteaceae endemic to New Zealand, named in honor of Thomas Andrew Knight. One extant species, K. excelsa (rewarewa) is found in New Zealand. Two further Knightia species are found in New Caledonia, although they were placed in the genus Eucarpha by Lawrie Johnson and Barbara Briggs in their influential 1975 monograph "On the Proteaceae: the evolution and classification of a southern family", a placement supported in a 2006 classification of the Proteaceae. A fossil species from upper Miocene deposits in Kaikorai has been described as Knightia oblonga. Knightia has been placed in the tribe Roupaleae of the subfamily Grevilleoideae.

== Species ==
As of April 2022, Plants of the World Online accepted three extant species. Other sources place the two species from New Caledonia in the genus Eucarpha.

- Knightia deplanchei Vieill. ex Brongn. & Gris, syn. Eucarpha deplanchei (Vieill. ex Brongn. & Gris) P.H.Weston & Mabb. – New Caledonia
- Knightia excelsa (Knight) R.Br. – New Zealand
- Knightia strobilina (Labill.) R.Br. ex Meisn., syn. Eucarpha strobilina (Labill.) P.H.Weston & Mabb. – New Caledonia
