= Noosa Biosphere Reserve =

Protected area in Queensland, Australia

- Location within Queensland
- Location: Queensland
- Coordinates: 26°19′50″S 152°57′6″E
- Area: 1,500 km^{2} (580 sq mi)
- Established: 2007
- Website: Official website

Noosa Biosphere Reserve is an internationally protected area covering the region of Noosa in Queensland, Australia. It contains the Noosa Everglades system, an 85,000ha system that stretches 65 km from the headwaters of the Noosa River in the North, to Lake Weyba, Lake Doonella and Laguna Bay in the South. It is described as one of only two Everglades systems in the world due to the entire system's close analogues to the Florida Everglades as a whole It is formally recognised as a Biosphere Reserve by the United Nations Education, Scientific and Cultural Organization (UNESCO) and Man and the Biosphere (MAB) program for its highly diverse ecosystem over a relatively small space. It was the first Biosphere Reserve for the state of Queensland, established in September 2007. The reserve is bound by the Noosa Shire Council boundaries, extending offshore by 3 kilometres (1.9 mi), covering 150,000 hectares (370,000 acres) in total. It is governed by Noosa Biosphere Limited (NBL), a not-for-profit company, which mainly consists of members from the local community who fulfil roles in the governance board, sector boards, and partnerships. Community plays a significant role in the implementation of the Biosphere Reserve guidelines.

== History ==
The Noosa Biosphere Reserve was established as a protected area by UNESCO in 2007. A designation for the biosphere reserve was reinstated in 2018 for the community to live in sustainability and harmony for the natural environment.

== Ecology ==
Noosa Biosphere Reserve is located in the Macpherson-Macleay overlap, where tropical and temperate zones overlap. The landscape has an extensive composition of rainforests, beaches, woodlands, wetlands, lakes, rivers, forests, and mountains. The Noosa region provides an extremely accommodating landscape for both flora and fauna due to its location in the intersection of the Torresian and Bassian biogeographic regions. It is a major centre of species richness and endemism, supporting speciation and biodiversity.

The reserve includes the following National Parks - Noosa National Park, Noosa River National Park, Great Sandy National Park and Mount Pinbarren National Park. Three State Forests exist: Ringtail, Yurol, and Toolara. Four Forest Reserves exist in this area, including Tewantin Forest Reserve, Woondum Forest Reserve, Noosa Forest Reserve, Tuchekoi Forest Reserve. Nine Conservation Parks are part of the Noosa Biosphere Reserve, and focus on the following areas: Mt Cooroy, Tuchekoi, Harry and Gladys Spring, Cooloothin, Sheep Island, Keyser Island, Weyba Creek, Goat Island, and Six-Mile Creek. The following eight nature refuges are included in the protection plan: Arthur Harrold, Bill Huxley, Pender Scrub, Burrawingee, Hilltop, Una and Harold Corbold, Giraween, and Schreibers Road, Cooran. In addition to this, Cooloola (Noosa River) Resource Reserve and Great Sandy Resource Reserve are also included in the region.

== Flora ==
Vegetation types include rainforest, ecotonal forests, eucalypt forests, melaleuca communities, heathlands and sedgelands, mangroves and saline communities, frontal dune and foreshore communities, exposed high dune sand systems, freshwater and marine ecosystems. Significant species in the area include Acronychia littorali, she-oak (Allocasuarina rigida), keys boronia (Boronia keysii), swamp string bark (Eucalyptus conglomerata), Macarthuria complanata, pineapple zamia (Macrozamia pauli-guilielmi), swamp orchids (Phaius australis/tancarvilleae), glossy spice bush (Triunia robusta), and southern penda (Xanthostemon oppositifolius).

The genus Allocasuarina provides the predominant food source for the vulnerable glossy black-cockatoo (Calyptorhynchus lathami), with Allocasuarina rigida and Allocasuarina littoralis being the most commonly consumed. The Koala Habitat Atlas study performed on the former Noosa Shire in 1996/1997 and 2001/2002 confirmed that the genus Eucalyptus is a primary factor in habitat selection for koalas (Phascolarctos cinereus). The glossy spice bush (Triunia robusta) is currently endangered, and the majority of its population is restricted to Maroochy river area.

== Fauna ==
=== Amphibians ===
Located in the Noosa Biosphere Reserve are the giant barred frog (Mixophyes iteratus) and cascade tree frog (Litoria pearsoniana). They are both currently listed as threatened species in the Nature Conservation Act (NCA) 1992. Residing in the same reserve are the wallum froglet (Crinia tinnula), green thighed frog (Litoria brevipalmata), cooloola sedgefrog (Litoria cooloolensis), wallum rocketfrog (Litoria freycineti), and wallum sedgefrog (Litoria olongburensis). These particular species have experienced declining populations in Australia, and are part of the global amphibian decline.

=== Reptiles ===
Threatened species in the area include the flatback turtle (Natator depressus), loggerhead turtle (Caretta caretta), collared delma (Delma torquata), and the three-toed snake-tooth skink (Coeranoscincus reticulatus). Reptiles, along with amphibians, provide the reserve with indications of the ongoing and future state of the environmental quality.

=== Birds ===
The Noosa Biosphere Reserve is a vital element of the BirdLife International designated Endemic Bird Area (EBA) Eastern Australia zone. The reserve houses over 300 bird species, with a dynamic and diverse population encompassing 44% of documented Australian resident bird species population, as well as migratory bird species. Significant species in the area include the square-tailed kite (Lophoictinia isura), red goshawk (Erythrotriorchis radiates), black-breasted button-quail (Turnix melanogaster), glossy black cockatoo (Calyptohynchus lathami erebus), Coxen’s fig parrot (Cyclopsitta diophthalma coxeni), swift parrot (Lathamus discolor), eastern ground parrot (Pezoporus wallicus wallicus), and the regent bowerbird (Sericulus chrysocephalus).

The woodlands in the Noosa Biosphere Reserve provide an ideal habitat for many of the bird species mentioned. The glossy black cockatoo (Calyptohynchus lathami erebus) is especially reliant on large woodland tree hollows for breeding. This particular species is currently listed as vulnerable in Queensland, as is the black breasted button-quail (Turnix melanogaster), and the eastern ground parrot (Pezoporus wallicus wallicus). Species with significantly small populations and recognised as endangered by Queensland Government are the red goshawk (Erythrotriorchis radiates), Coxen’s fig parrot (Cyclopsitta diophthalma coxeni), and the swift parrot (Lathamus discolor).

The swift parrot (Lathamus discolor) is a nationally endangered migratory bird which breeds only in Tasmania but migrates to mainland Australia for wintering. Its habitat requirements are similar to the glossy black-cockatoo in that it requires shelter in a woodland tree hollow, albeit a smaller size. The habitat requirements of the black breasted button-quail (Turnix melanogaster), and the eastern ground parrot (Pezoporus wallicus wallicus) are somewhat different in that they forage and live in the rainforest vine thickets and heathland floors respectively.

=== Mammals ===
Notable species in the reserve include the koala (Phascolarctos cinereus), tiger quoll (Dasyurus maculatus), greater long-eared bat (Nyctophilus timoriensis), false water rat (Xeromys myoides), humpback whale (Megaptera novaeangliae), and the dugong (Dugong dugon). Both the koala (Phascolarctos cinereus) and humpback whale (Megaptera novaeangliae) are flagship species in Australia, receiving a great deal of conservation attention from the public. In comparison, species like the greater long-eared bat and the false water-rat (Xeromys myoides) are unknown to most of the public, but are nationally vulnerable species, with current studies indicating both require the same level of conservation attention to prevent further decline in abundance and distribution. Even megafauna species dugong (Dugong dugon) numbers are also in steady decline, with extinction forecast for this vulnerable species within this century.

=== Fish ===
The Duncker’s pipehorse (Solegnathis dunckeri), Mary River cod (Maccullochella peelii mariensis), and oxleyan pygmy perch (Nannoperca oxleyana) are fish species located in the Noosa Biosphere reserve. Unfortunately the Mary River cod (Maccullochella peelii mariensis) was ignored until the 1980s, and only in 1993 did it receive a formal classification. This has resulted in a dramatic decline in both abundance and genetic diversity for this particular species.

=== Invertebrates ===
Species present in the area include the yabby (Cherax punctatus), swamp crayfish (Tenuibranchiurus glypticus), Richmond birdwing butterfly (Ornithoptera richmondia), and the Australian fritillary (Argyreus hyoerbius inconstans). Both of these butterfly species are threatened, with Queensland conservation statuses listing them as vulnerable and endangered respectively.

== Environmental threats and issues ==
One major current threat is the proposed large commercial jet flight path for the new Sunshine Coast Airport runway - the proposed flight paths show that low altitude passenger jets are to fly within the Noosa Biosphere area as well as key surrounding areas. Such a development could destroy natural ecosystems and lead to loss of status.

Previous and current threats to both flora and fauna in the Noosa region include clearing, urban development, logging, agriculture, littering, tourism, fires (including both naturally occurring and scheduled fire regimes), invasive weeds, flooding, sea level rise, pollution, fragmentation, invasive species, boat wake erosion, drainage, and recreational vehicle use. Climate change also threatens the Noosa Biosphere Reserve, with more severe tropical cyclones predicted and further flooding due to rising sea levels anticipated, resulting in dune erosion, shoreline recession, and significant damage to the ecosystem.

Amphibians in the area are under threat from the chytridiomycosis fungal disease, which has been confirmed as a factor in the decline of the cascade tree frog (Litoria pearsoniana) population in southeast Queensland. Additionally, the giant barred frog (Mixophyes iteratus) has suffered at the hands of the public due to being mistaken for the cane toad (Bufo marinus), indirectly contributing to its decline. The cane toad has also had a direct effect on ground nesting bird species in the area, including them and their eggs as part of their diet.

Weed invasion is significantly threatening the area, either suffocating native flora, or colonising areas after fires have cleared land. Lantana (Lantana camara) is an Australian Weed of National Significance (WoNS) and significantly threatens over 250 native plant species and 24 native animal species. Reptiles with ground-dwelling habits, particularly skinks and amphibians, including the cascade tree frog (Litoria pearsoniana), are included as species that are also threatened by Lantana (Lantana camara). Other invasive weeds present in the Noosa Biosphere Reserve are Dutchman’s pipe (Aristolochia elegans) and camphor laurel (Cinnamomum camphora). Dutchman’s pipe (Aristolochia elegans), an introduced vine, is used by the Richmond birdwing butterfly (Ornithoptera richmondia) to lay its eggs, unaware that this particular vine is toxic to its larvae. Camphor laurel (Cinnamomum camphora) is a toxic introduced tree that threatens native birds in the Noosa region, particularly parrots, due to its toxic seeds and flowers, which are contributing to death or sterility in these species.

Previous logging of rainforest and woodland in the Noosa region has led to habitat loss and fragmentation for many bird species, particularly for the black-breasted button-quail (Turnix melanogaster), Coxen’s fig-parrot (Cyclopsitta diophthalma coxeni), glossy black-cockatoo (Calyptohynchus lathami erebus), and the swift parrot (Lathamus discolor). Previous clearing of eucalypt forests has also affected the primary food source and habitat of the koala (Phascolarctos cinereus).

Wetlands of national importance in the Noosa region, such as Lake Weyba and Noosa River Wetlands, are threatened by sea level rise, further flooding, and climate change. This directly affects and threatens the habitat of the false water-rat (Xeromys myoides). Fish species, such as the oxleyan pygmy perch (Nannoperca oxleyana) have had their abundance reduced in Noosa due to man-made stream contaminants, lack of stream flow, and introduced species.

Marine animals that frequent the Noosa Biosphere Reserve, such as the dugong (Dugong dugon), flatback turtle (Natator depressus), and the loggerhead turtle (Caretta caretta) are threatened by the decline in seagrasses, their primary food source. In addition to this threat, the loggerhead turtle’s eggs and hatchlings are at high risk of predation.

== Management ==
The designation of Noosa as a Biosphere Reserve offers managers and stakeholders with a learning environment where they can research and investigate different conservation approaches to deliver the best outcomes for the area. Essentially, the Biosphere Reserve is a ‘Learning Laboratory’ that encourages sustainable development of the designated area. The Noosa Biosphere Reserve Management Plan (2009–2012) and the Noosa Biosphere Reserve website provide guidance to deliver sustainable conservation to the protected area and the species contained within.

Conservation for the Biosphere Reserve is mostly aimed at protecting and preserving the different land cover types present in the area. This results in flora protection which directly benefits the fauna within. Specifically, the main projects coordinated for conservation of the area include: designated conservation areas, weed management programs, promotion of fire protection, regeneration and revegetation, specific planning controls, visitor management, captive breeding programs, control programs for beach erosion prevention, use management, transfer of transition land into buffer zone and buffer land into core zone, and education and awareness. In addition to this, specific recovery plans and conservation guidelines mandated by the either state or federal government are enforced via Noosa Biosphere Limited for the Noosa Biosphere Reserve. This includes plans such as the ‘National Recovery Plan for the black-breasted button-quail Turnix melanogaster’ and ‘Commonwealth Conservation Advice on Triunia robusta’.

Designation of Fish Habitat Areas (FHA) in Queensland, such as the Noosa River and Maroochy Pumicestone Channel, are aimed at conserving fish diversity by restricting or eliminating disturbance to these areas. In 2012, the Noosa River ranked in the top five FHAs of the state, demonstrating the effectiveness of the Noosa Biosphere Reserve. Other conservation efforts in the area include koala tracking to identify conditions and locations, as well as research involving surveys on koala faecal-pellets in Noosa Shire to contribute to the effective restoration of their habitat. Riparian weed control along a degraded section of Cooroora Creek, Pomona, is a current project in the Biosphere Reserve that will improve the habitat of the giant barred frog (Mixophyes iteratus).

Climate change has been actively discussed and progressed on the agenda since 2009 for the Noosa Biosphere Reserve. Active steps have been taken by Noosa Biosphere Limited to address climate change, including continually educating and engaging the community about climate change and its potential effect on the area, gathering community feedback on the issue, promoting government initiatives such as the Queensland Premier’s ClimateSmart Sustainability Awards and Earth Hour, engaging climate change experts for advice and guidance, supporting carbon pollution legislation, and a draft ‘Noosa Climate Action Plan’ created in 2011. In addition to the above, Noosa Biosphere Limited has also compiled and updated lists of both fauna and flora present in the area, noting issues such as state significance, commonwealth significance, scientific names, conservation status, and regionally specific comments. A key project for the reserve, starting from the 2012/2013 financial year, is the production of the ‘State of the Biosphere Report’ to measure its progress. Research is supported by the Noosa Biosphere Reserve, with a research centre proposed for the area. Lastly, Noosa Biosphere Limited is an active advocate of upgrading conservation statuses of protected zones. This will provide further stability for all species in the area, along with all of the other measures currently endorsed by the Noosa Biosphere Reserve.

== See also ==
- List of biosphere reserves in Australia
