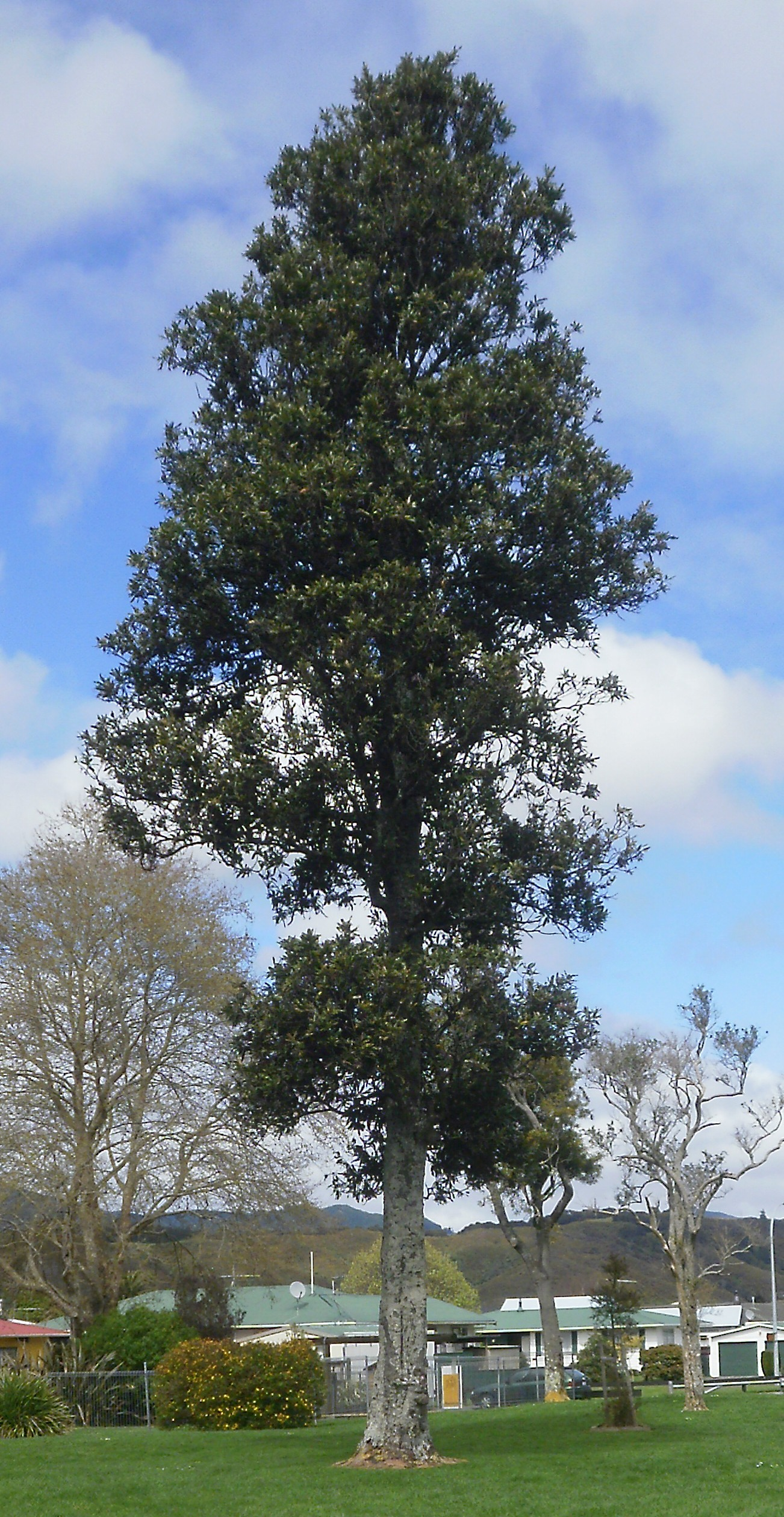
- K. excelsa in Upper Hutt

Scientific classification
- Kingdom: Plantae
- Clade: Embryophytes
- Clade: Tracheophytes
- Clade: Spermatophytes
- Clade: Angiosperms
- Clade: Eudicots
- Order: Proteales
- Family: Proteaceae
- Genus: Knightia
- Species: K. excelsa

Binomial name
- Knightia excelsa (Knight) R. Br.

Synonyms
- Rymandra excelsa Knight

= Knightia excelsa =

Species of tree endemic to New Zealand

Knightia excelsa, commonly known as rewarewa (from Māori), is an evergreen tree endemic to the low elevation and valley forests of New Zealand. It is found in the North Island and at the tip of the South Island in the Marlborough Sounds (41° S) and the type species for the genus Knightia.

== Description ==
Rewarewa grows to 30 metres (100 feet) tall, with a slender crown. The leaves are alternate, leathery, narrow oblong, 10–15 cm (3.9–5.9 in) long and 2.5–3.5 cm (0.98–1.38 in) wide, and without stipules. The flowers are 2–3.5 cm (0.79–1.38 in) long, bright red, and borne in racemes 10 cm (3.9 in) long. Produces dry woody follicles.

== Taxonomy ==
The species was first formally described in 1809 by Joseph Knight in the book On the cultivation of the plants belonging to the natural order of Proteeae, using the name Rymandra excelsa. This was revised the following year by Robert Brown in the paper On the Proteaceae of Jussieu, who placed the species in the genus Knightia, named after Joseph Knight. This remains the accepted scientific name used today.

Knightia excelsa is one of only two extant members of Proteaceae found in New Zealand, alongside Toronia toru. Many other species existed in the past, but became extinct during glaciation periods.

== Etymology ==
The etymology (word origin) of rewarewa's genus, Knightia, is named in honour of British horticulturalist Thomas Andrew Knight. The specific epithet (second part of the scientific name), excelsa, means 'elevated' or 'tall'. The Māori language name rewarewa derives from the Proto Nuclear Polynesian term *Lewa, primarily used to describe Cerbera odollam and other members of the Cerbera genus in Polynesian languages. It was called New Zealand honeysuckle by early European settlers, but the name has fallen into disuse in preference for the Māori name.

== Ecology ==
Rewarewa flower nectar is a major food source for many New Zealand native birds and is also attractive to geckos and the lesser short-tailed bat.

== Uses ==
=== Māori cultural uses ===
Rewarewa is a traditional resource in Māori culture. The wood was used for posts in rivers and to create palisade walls, and it has uses in traditional waka crafting, where a slow burning trunk of the wood can be placed inside a tree to more easily hollow out the centre. The nectar is also a traditional Māori food source.

=== Early European uses ===
Rewarewa trees had a bad reputation among early European settlers, who called the timber "bucket of water wood", due to its high moisture content and unsuitability as a firestarter.

=== Modern uses ===
The rewarewa is known for its timber, which is handsomely figured for interior work although not durable in exposed situations. Rewarewa honey is one of the most popular native New Zealand honey varieties.

== Gallery ==
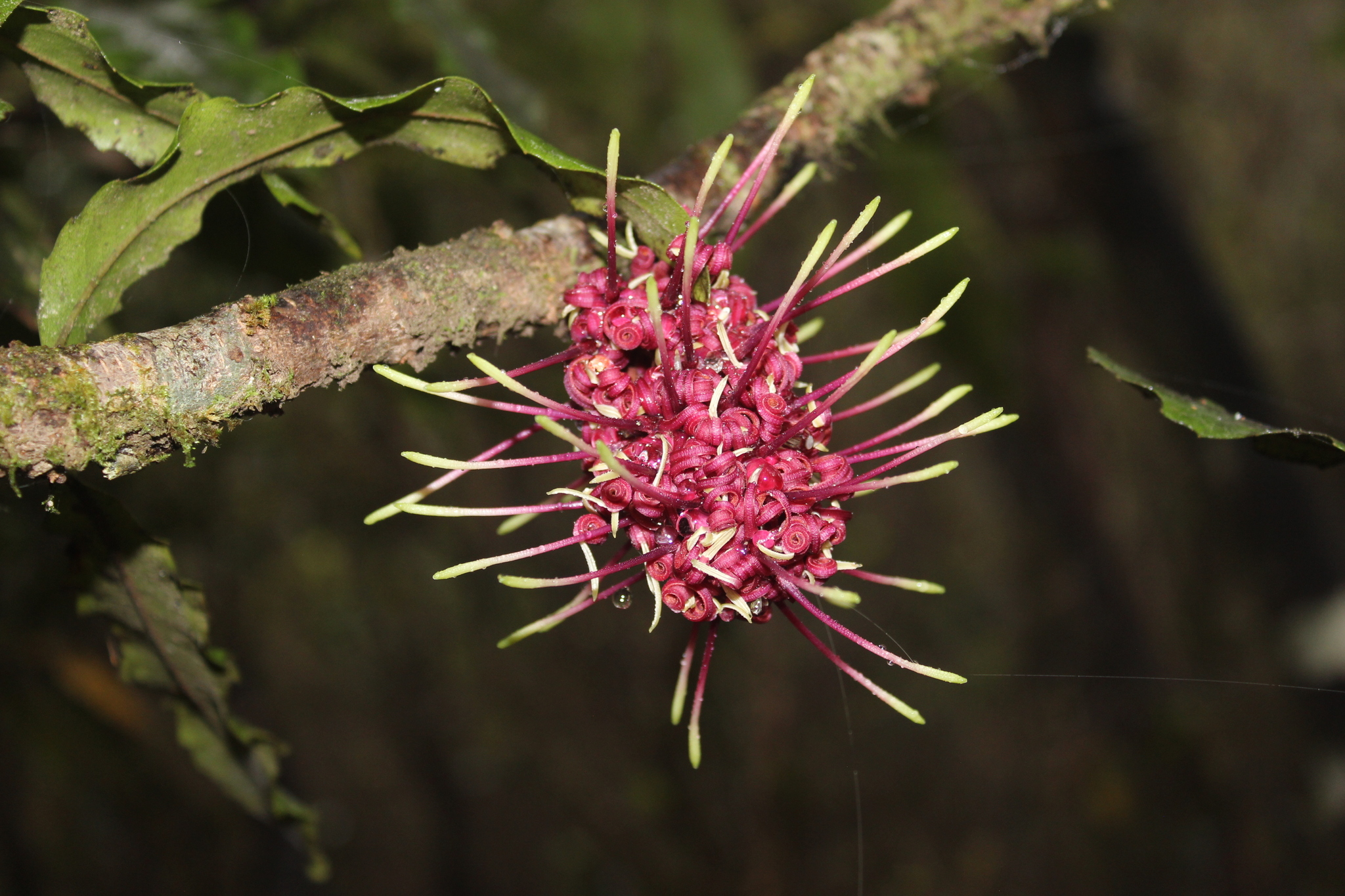
Inflorescence of flowers

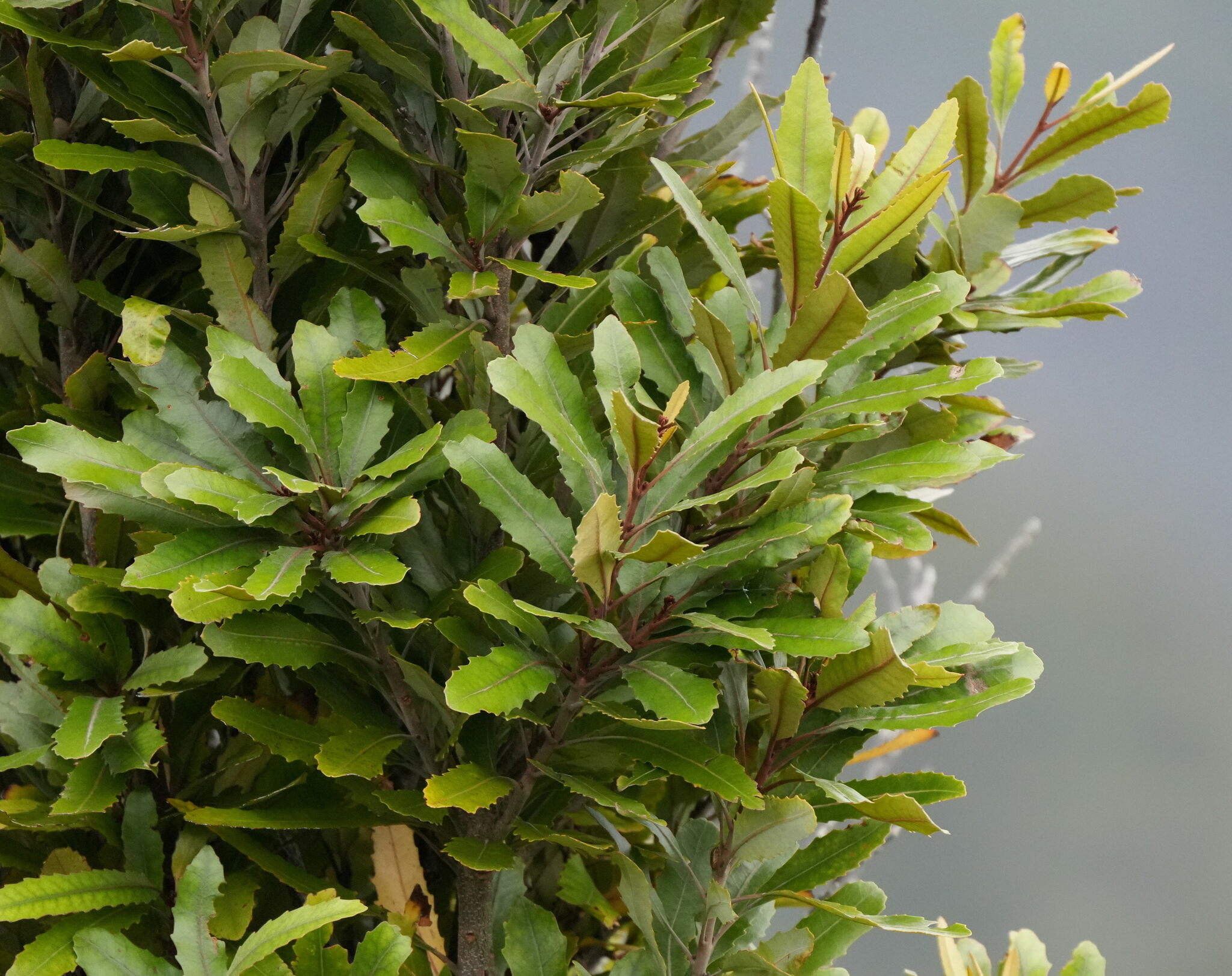
Adult foliage

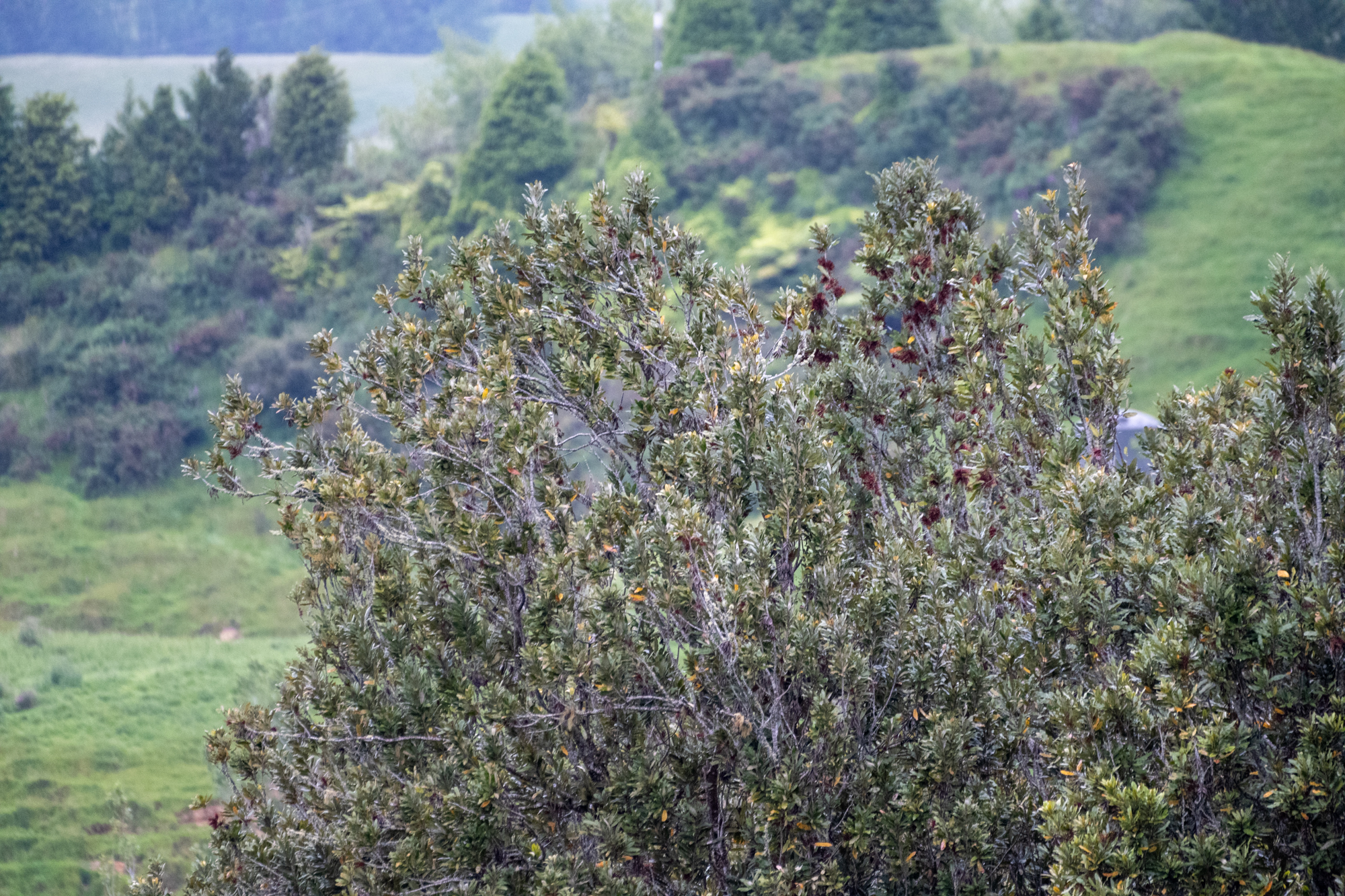
Tree in flower

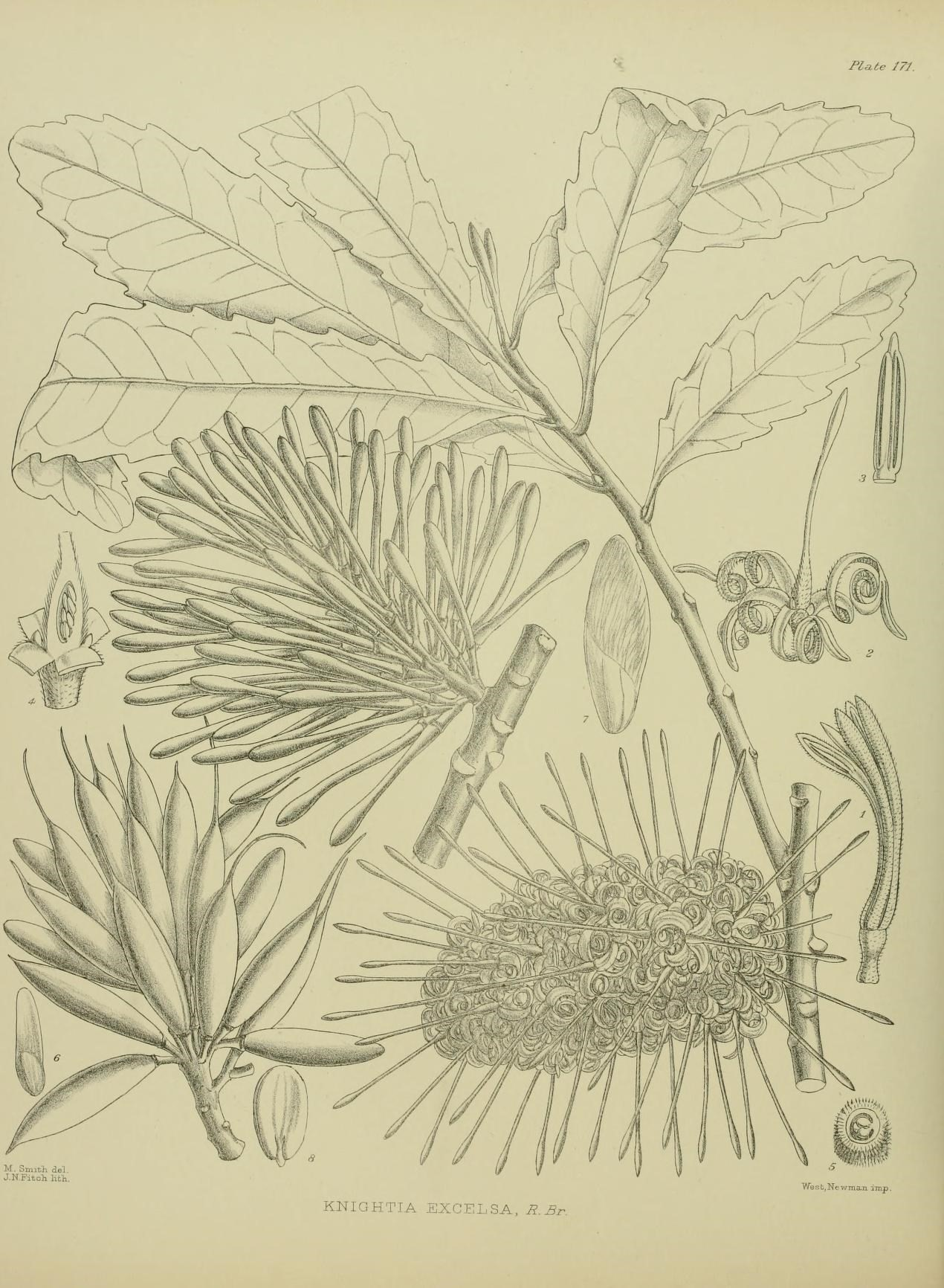
Illustration by Matilda Smith
