= Triunia erythrocarpa =

Scientific classification
- Kingdom: Plantae
- Clade: Embryophytes
- Clade: Tracheophytes
- Clade: Spermatophytes
- Clade: Angiosperms
- Clade: Eudicots
- Order: Proteales
- Family: Proteaceae
- Genus: Triunia
- Species: T. erythrocarpa

Binomial name
- Triunia erythrocarpa Foreman

Species of shrub native to Australia

Triunia erythrocarpa, or spice bush, is a shrub of the family Proteaceae native to Queensland, Australia.
