= Xylomelum scottianum =

Scientific classification
- Kingdom: Plantae
- Clade: Tracheophytes
- Clade: Angiosperms
- Clade: Eudicots
- Order: Proteales
- Family: Proteaceae
- Genus: Xylomelum
- Species: X. scottianum

Binomial name
- Xylomelum scottianum (F.Muell.) F.Muell.

Synonyms
- Helicia scottiana F.Muell.; Xylomelum salicinum (Meisn.) Benth.

Species of plant endemic to Australia

Xylomelum scottianum is a shrub or small tree in the woody pear genus of the family Proteaceae that is commonly known as the northern woody pear. It grows to 10 m (33 ft) in height. Endemic to Australia, it is widespread in dry areas of Cape York Peninsula, Queensland, and on Thursday Island in Torres Strait. It is common on sandy soils in open forests, at altitudes of up to 440 m (1,440 ft) above sea level. It flowers from October to May. The brown seeds are 68–77 mm (2.7–3.0 in) long. It was used medicinally by the Aboriginal people, as an infusion of the bark and leaves, drunk to relieve internal pain.
