= Mount Pinbarren National Park =

National park in Australia

- IUCN category V (protected landscape/seascape)
- Location within Queensland
- Location: Queensland
- Coordinates: 26°19′12″S 152°51′15″E
- Area: 0.227 km^{2} (0.088 sq mi)
- Established: 1929; 97 years ago
- Governing body: Queensland Parks and Wildlife Service

Mount Pinbarren is a national park in Queensland, Australia, 129 km north of Brisbane. It is located in Pinbarren, a locality in the Shire of Noosa. Mount Pinbarren lies within the South East Queensland bioregion and the Mary River catchment area.

The park protects the naturally vegetated slopes of Mount Pinbarren. It was established to preserve significant hoop pine complex microphyll vine forest and habitat for the endangered Coxen’s fig parrot.

Access to the park is limited as it is surrounded by private property.

== Commonwealth Heritage List ==
Mount Pinbarren National Park contains a small sample of remnant araucarian notophyll vine forest more typical of drier areas further west. The park includes several uncommon and rare plant species. Clausena Brevistyla occurs on the summit, and is close to its southern limit here. The rare and endangered species, Baloghia Marmorata, has recently been found on Mount Pinbarren. The uncommon species, Grevillea Hilliana is present. A possible new species of cyperus grows on the summit. The peak represents a scenically important landmark for the area.

== Description ==
This small National Park includes Mount Pinbarren, a prominent feature above the surrounding landscape. Much of the mountain has a rocky substrate. Mount Pinbarren is a rainforest island surrounded by cleared lands. Hoop pine (Araucaria Cunninghamii) is dominant. The araucarian notophyll vine forest (ANVF) is unusual in the district, as many of the species are representative of dry rainforest. Some other species present include Olea Paniculata, Ophioglossum Pendulum, Hodkinsonia Oratifola, Calophaniodes Hyhrophiloides and Tragia Novaehollandiae.

== Condition and Integrity ==
Lantana Camara grows where the canopy has been distirubed. The exotic herb (Rivina Humilis) is widespread on the forest floor. In general, however, the condition is good.

== See also ==
- Noosa Biosphere Reserve
- Protected areas of Queensland
