= Eucarpha =

Scientific classification
- Kingdom: Plantae
- Clade: Tracheophytes
- Clade: Angiosperms
- Clade: Eudicots
- Order: Proteales
- Family: Proteaceae
- Subfamily: Grevilleoideae
- Tribe: Roupaleae
- Genus: Eucarpha (R.Br.) Spach

Genus of plants endemic to New Caledonia

Eucarpha is a genus of flowering plant of the family Proteaceae, endemic to New Caledonia. Two species are recognised. Up to 1975, these were classified within the genus Knightia until Lawrence Johnson and Barbara G. Briggs recognised their distinctness, particularly their prominent bracts, in their 1975 monograph "On the Proteaceae: the evolution and classification of a southern family". Nomenclatural combinations for these two species in the genus Eucarpha were published in 2022.

In 2006, the genus was placed in the tribe Roupaleae. Its closest relative is the Australian Triunia.

== Species ==
As of October 2023, Plants of the World Online accepted two species:

- Eucarpha deplanchei (Vieill. ex Brongn. & Gris) P.H.Weston & Mabb., syn. Knightia deplanchei Vieill. ex Brongn. & Gris
- Eucarpha strobilina (Labill.) P.H.Weston & Mabb., syn. Knightia strobilina (Labill.) R.Br. ex Meisn.
