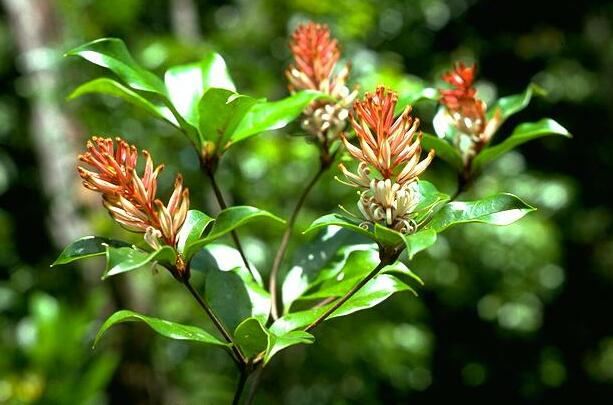

Scientific classification
- Kingdom: Plantae
- Clade: Tracheophytes
- Clade: Angiosperms
- Clade: Eudicots
- Order: Proteales
- Family: Proteaceae
- Genus: Triunia
- Species: T. montana

Binomial name
- Triunia montana (C.T.White) Foreman

= Triunia montana =

Species of shrub native to Queensland, Australia

Triunia montana, or mountain spice bush, is a shrub of the family Proteaceae native to Queensland, Australia.
