= Eucarpha deplanchei =

Conservation status
- Least Concern (IUCN 3.1)

Scientific classification
- Kingdom: Plantae
- Clade: Tracheophytes
- Clade: Angiosperms
- Clade: Eudicots
- Order: Proteales
- Family: Proteaceae
- Genus: Eucarpha
- Species: E. deplanchei

Binomial name
- Eucarpha deplanchei (Vieill. ex Brongn. & Gris) P.H.Weston & Mabb.

Synonyms
- Knightia deplanchei Vieill. ex Brongn. & Gris; Rymandra deplanchei (Vieill. ex Brongn. & Gris) Kuntze

Species of flowering plant

Eucarpha deplanchei is a species of flowering plant in the family Proteaceae, native to New Caledonia. It was first described in 1865 as Knightia deplanchei.

== Taxonomy ==
The species was placed within the genus Knightia until 1975, when Lawrence Johnson and Barbara G. Briggs recognized the distinctness of two New Caledonian species of Knightia, particularly their prominent bracts, and transferred both to Eucarpha, a transfer supported in 2006. The nomenclatural combination for the species in the genus Eucarpha was only published in 2022. Other sources, including Plants of the World Online as of April 2022, treat Eucarpha as a synonym of Knightia.
