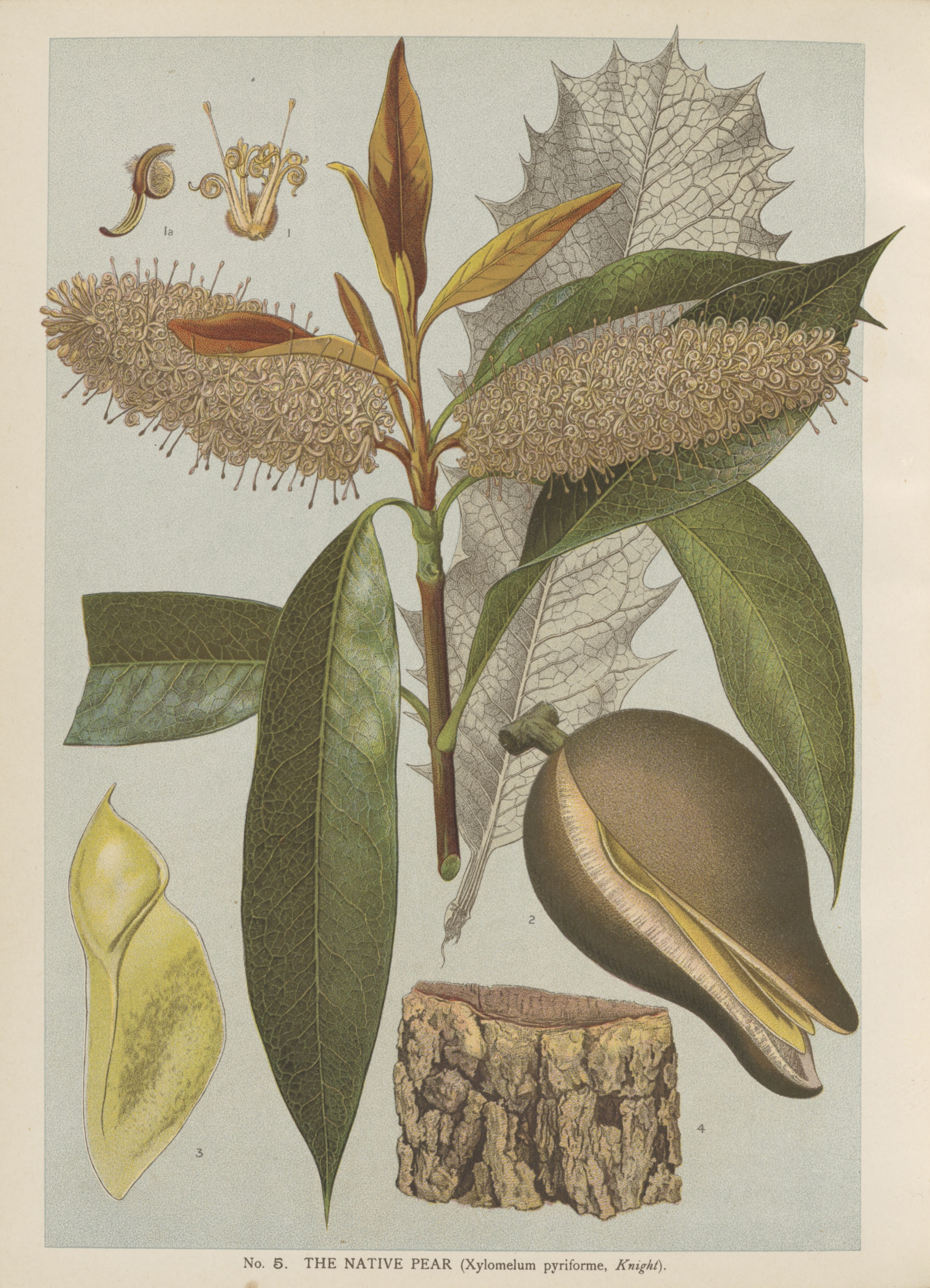
- Xylomelum pyriforme

Scientific classification
- Kingdom: Plantae
- Clade: Tracheophytes
- Clade: Angiosperms
- Clade: Eudicots
- Order: Proteales
- Family: Proteaceae
- Subfamily: Grevilleoideae
- Tribe: Roupaleae
- Subtribe: Lambertiinae
- Genus: Xylomelum; Sm.

Species
- See text

= Xylomelum =

Genus of plants native to Australia

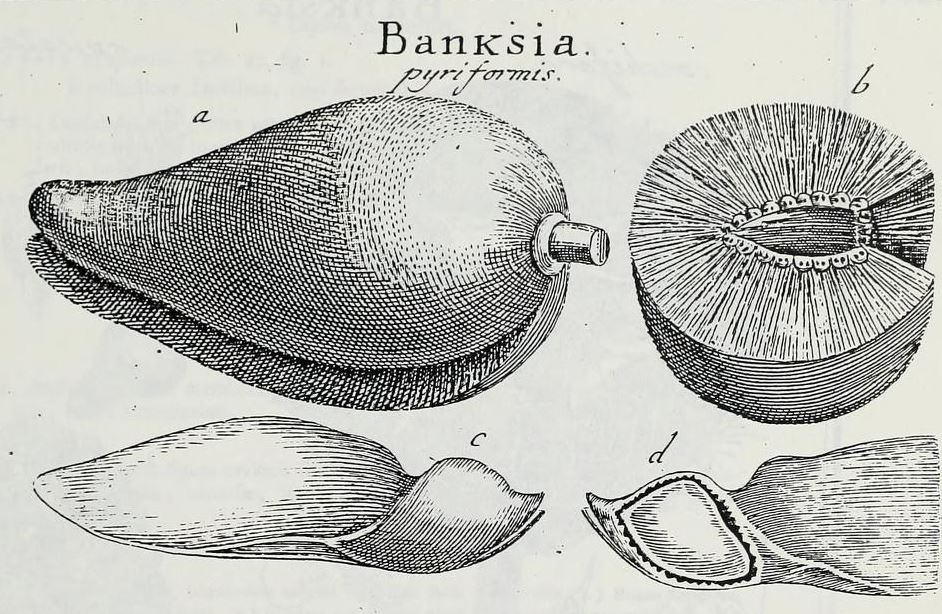
Engraving of Banksia pyriformis (fruit and seed) from Gaertner's 'De Fructibus...'

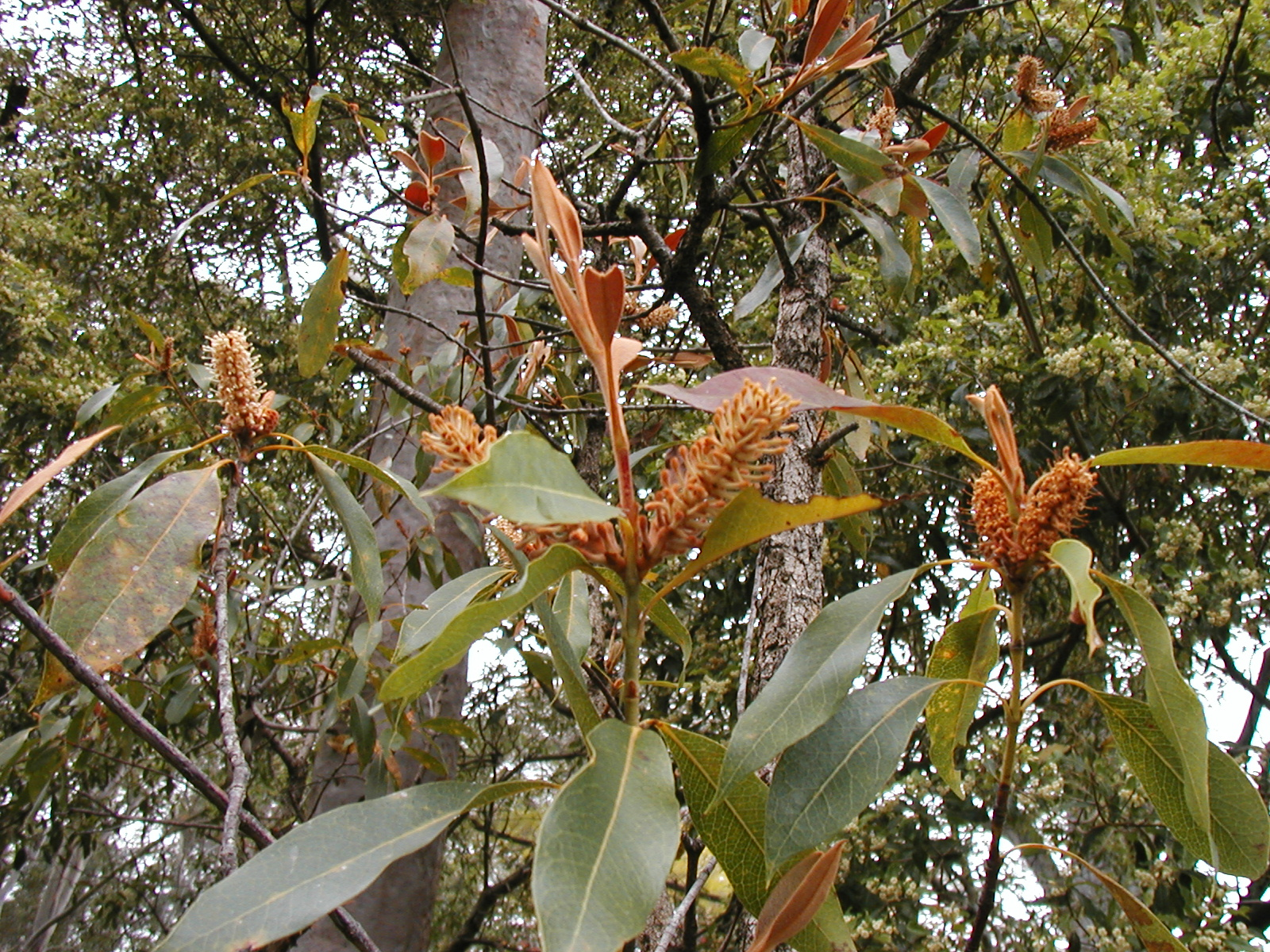
X. pyriforme flowers

Xylomelum is a genus of six species of flowering plants, often commonly known as woody pears, in the family Proteaceae and are endemic to Australia. Plants in this genus are tall shrubs or small trees with leaves arranged in opposite pairs, relatively small flowers arranged in spike-like groups, and the fruit a woody, more or less pear-shaped follicle.

== Description ==
Plants in the genus Xylomelum are shrubs or trees that typically grow to a height of 4–14 m (13–46 ft) and have simple, leathery leaves arranged in opposite pairs. Juvenile leaves have coarse, sometimes prickly teeth on the edges. The flowers are arranged in dense, spike-like racemes or panicles, the flowers in pairs with a bract at the base. Each flower has four similar tepals that roll back as the flower develops revealing four stamens. The fruit is a woody, more or less pear-shaped follicle attached at the larger end, that eventually splits into two halves and releases two winged seeds.

== Taxonomy ==
The genus Xylomelum was first formally described in 1798 by James Edward Smith in Transactions of the Linnean Society of London. The name Xylomelum is derived from the Greek xylon meaning "wood" and melon "tree-fruit", referring to the woody fruit.

In 1979, Farr, Leussink and Stafleu nominated Xylomelum pyriforme (Gaertn.) R.Br. as the lectotype, later corrected to Xylomelum pyriforme (Gaert.) Knight.

=== Evolution ===
The "pears" of Xylomelum species are thought to have evolved primarily as a defense against seed predation. However, these woody fruits also provide protection of the seeds from fire. Johnson and Briggs (1963) consider the woody seeds in Proteaceae to be a late evolutionary adaptation to fire.

=== Species list ===
The following is a list of species accepted by the Australian Plant Census as at November 2020:

- Xylomelum angustifolium Meisn. (W.A.)
- Xylomelum benthamii Orchard (Qld.)
- Xylomelum cunninghamianum Foreman (Qld., N.S.W.)
- Xylomelum occidentale R.Br. (W.A.)
- Xylomelum pyriforme (Gaertn.) Knight (N.S.W.)
- Xylomelum scottianum (F.Muell.) F.Muell. (Qld.)

A seventh species, Xylomelum salicinum A.Cunn. ex R.Br. is listed at Plants of the World Online but is regarded as a synonym of X. scottianum by the Australian Plant Census. In 2007, Anthony Edward Orchard suggested that X. salicinum (Meisn.) Benth. is a superfluous, illegitimate name and raised X. pyriforme var. salicinum Meisn. to species status as X. benthamii.

In 1788, Joseph Gaertner described Banksia pyriformis in De Fructibus et Seminibus Plantarum, a species whose genus was effectively reclassified when Smith described the genus, Xylomelum in 1798. Smith gave the essential characters of Xylomelum as: flower spikes with simple scales; flowers with four petals bearing four stamens, with a blunt, club-shaped stigma, with a uni-locular capsule having two seeds, the seeds being winged.

In 1810, Robert Brown gave a key to the genera of Proteaceae in Transactions of the Linnean Society of London, placing Xylomelum in the group of Proteaceae which have dehiscent fruit and are unilocular with two seeds, thereby grouping Anadenia, Grevillea, Hakea, Lambertia, Orites and Rhopala together. Within the group, Xylomelum is distinguished from Orites and Rhopala by having winged seeds, a thickened woody follicle with an excentric locule, and a club-shaped stigma.

In 1888, Engler, in Die Natürlichen Pflanzenfamilien, divided the Proteaceae into two sub-families, Persoonioideae and Grevilloideae, placing Xylomelum in Grevilloideae, and as being like Helicia in having the flower axis at the base with four glands, but differing from it by having the inflorescence in 'ears', not in loose 'grapes', and by having seeds with wings.

In 1975, Johnson and Briggs placed Xylomelum in the subfamily Grevilleoideae and the tribe Heliciaea (together with Helicia, Triunia and Hollandaea). However, Weston and Barker (2006), argue that within the tribe of Roupaleae, Xylomelum should be placed in the subtribe of Lambertiinae and not together with the Helicia in the subtribe of Heliciinae, using in part, the evidence of the molecular studies of Hoot and Douglas, who pair Xylomelum with Lambertia.

See Grevilleoideae for further discussion of the placement of Xylomelum within the Proteaceae.

== Distribution and habitat ==
Two species, X. angustifolium and X. occidentale, are endemic to Western Australia and the remaining five species are found in New South Wales and Queensland. All are either mesophytes or grow in dry environments.
