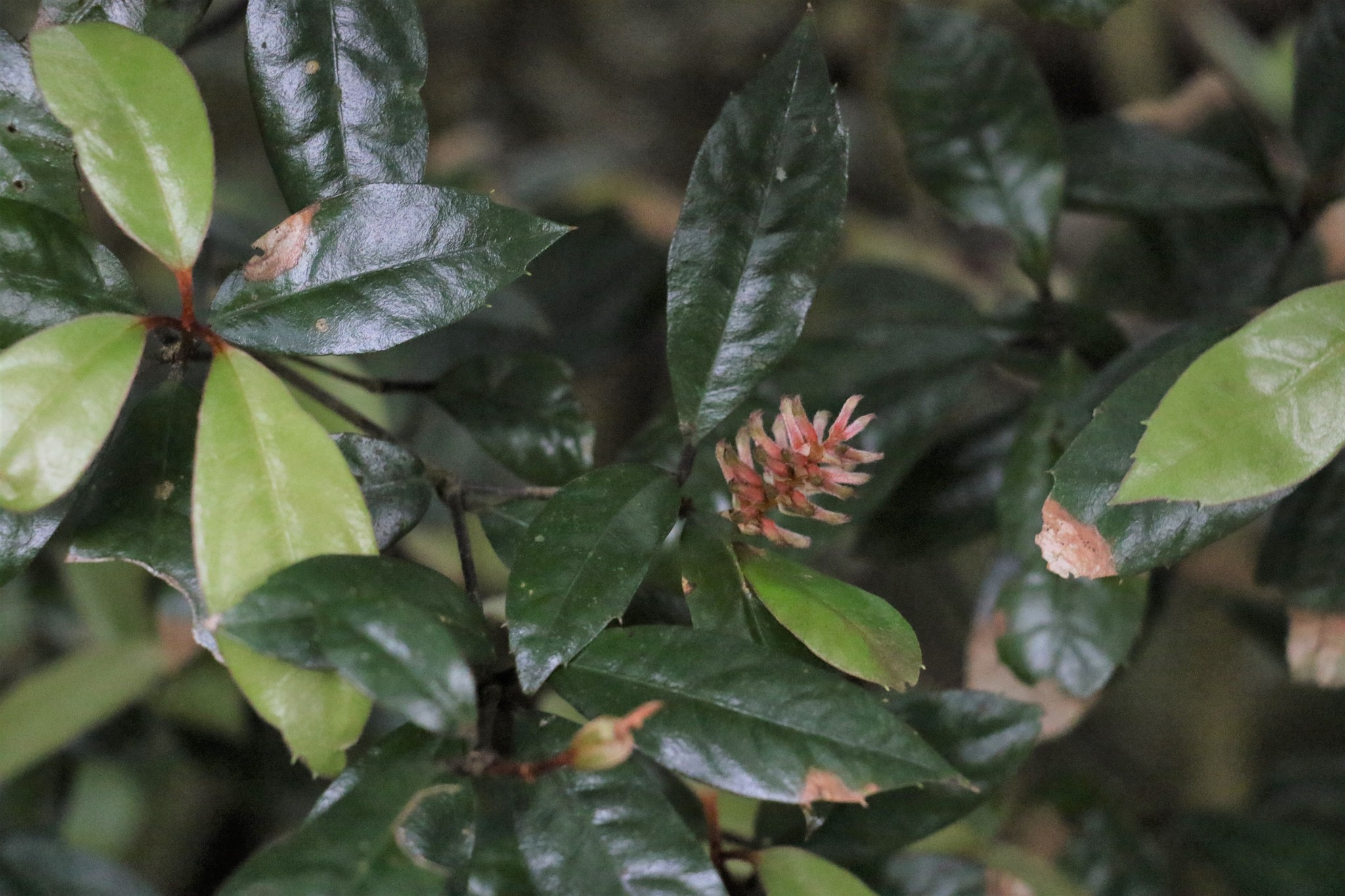

Scientific classification
- Kingdom: Plantae
- Clade: Tracheophytes
- Clade: Angiosperms
- Clade: Eudicots
- Order: Proteales
- Family: Proteaceae
- Genus: Triunia
- Species: T. youngiana

Binomial name
- Triunia youngiana (C.Moore & F.Muell. ex F.Muell.) L.A.S.Johnson & B.G.Briggs

= Triunia youngiana =

Species of shrub native to Australia

Triunia youngiana, commonly known as red nut or spice bush, is a shrub of the family Proteaceae native to New South Wales and Queensland.
