= Triunia robusta =

Scientific classification
- Kingdom: Plantae
- Clade: Tracheophytes
- Clade: Angiosperms
- Clade: Eudicots
- Order: Proteales
- Family: Proteaceae
- Genus: Triunia
- Species: T. robusta

Binomial name
- Triunia robusta (C.T.White) Foreman

Species of shrub native to Queensland, Australia

Triunia robusta, or glossy spice bush, is a shrub of the family Proteaceae native to Queensland.
