= Eucarpha strobilina =

Conservation status
- Least Concern (IUCN 3.1)

Scientific classification
- Kingdom: Plantae
- Clade: Tracheophytes
- Clade: Angiosperms
- Clade: Eudicots
- Order: Proteales
- Family: Proteaceae
- Genus: Eucarpha
- Species: E. strobilina

Binomial name
- Eucarpha strobilina (Labill.) P.H.Weston & Mabb.

Synonyms
- Embothrium strobilinum Labill.; Knightia integrifolia A.Cunn.; Knightia strobilina R.Br. (nom. inval.); Knightia strobilina (Labill.) R.Br. ex Meisn.; Knightia strobilina (Labill.) Virot; Rymandra strobilina (Labill.) Kuntze

Species of flowering plant

Eucarpha strobilina, synonym Knightia strobilina, is a species of flowering plant in the family Proteaceae, native to New Caledonia.

== Taxonomy ==
The taxonomic history of the species is somewhat tangled, as some names have been used that were not formally published. The species was first described as Embothrium strobilinum by Jacques Labillardière in 1806. In 1830, Robert Brown wrote that it seemed to belong to Knightia, but did not actually make the combination, so the name "Knightia strobilina R.Br." is invalid. In 1856, Carl Meissner listed "K.? strobilina" under Knightia, referring to Brown, and excluded it from Embothrium; the combination Knightia strobilina was also used in 1968. Following Meissner, the species continued to be placed in Knightia until 1975, when Lawrence Johnson and Barbara G. Briggs recognized the distinctness of two New Caledonian species of Knightia, particularly their prominent bracts, and transferred both to Eucarpha, a transfer supported in 2006. The nomenclatural combination for the species in the genus Eucarpha was only published in 2022.
