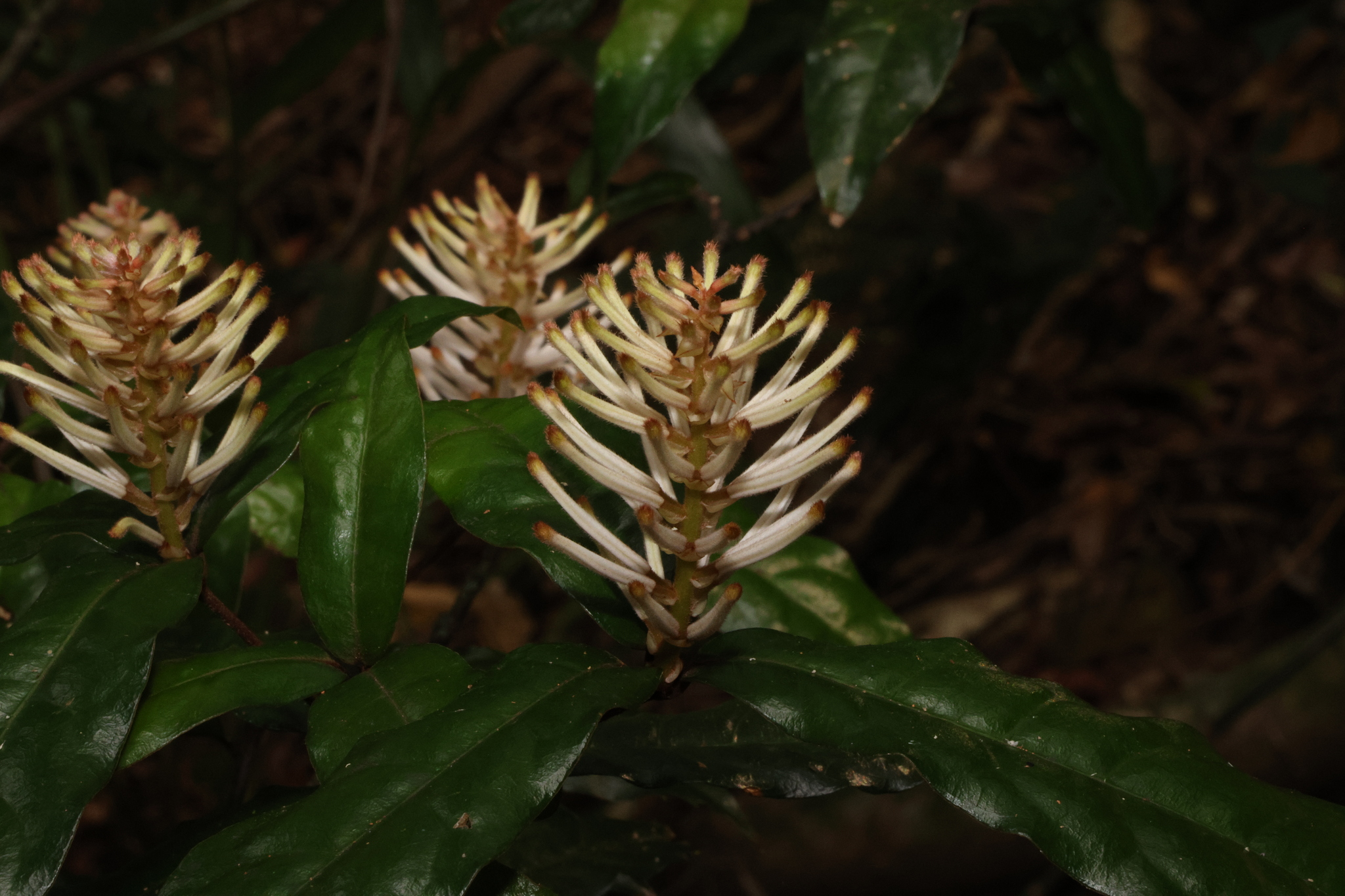
- Triunia youngiana

Scientific classification
- Kingdom: Plantae
- Clade: Tracheophytes
- Clade: Angiosperms
- Clade: Eudicots
- Order: Proteales
- Family: Proteaceae
- Subfamily: Grevilleoideae
- Tribe: Roupaleae
- Genus: Triunia; L.A.S.Johnson & B.G.Briggs (1975)

Type species
- Triunia youngiana (C.Moore & F.Muell.) L.A.S.Johnson & Briggs (1864)

= Triunia =

Genus of plants from eastern Australia

Triunia is a genus of medium to tall shrubs or small trees found as understorey plants in rainforests of eastern Australia. Members of the plant family Proteaceae, they are notable for their poisonous fleshy fruits or drupes. Only one species, T. youngiana, is commonly seen in cultivation.

== Taxonomy ==
Lawrie Johnson and Barbara G. Briggs described the genus Triunia in their 1975 monograph "On the Proteaceae: the evolution and classification of a southern family". The group of species in this genus was previously recognised as a subgenus, Macadamiopsis, of Helicia by Hermann Sleumer in 1955. T. youngiana was made the type species. This plant had originally been described in 1864 as Helicia youngiana before being transferred to the genus Macadamia.

They initially placed the genus in its own subtribe, Triuniinae, within the tribe Helicieae. More recently, the genus has been placed in the tribe Roupaleae, Its closest relative is Eucarpha, from New Caledonia.

=== Species ===
- Triunia erythrocarpa Foreman – Wet Tropics of north-eastern Qld endemic
- Triunia montana (C.T.White) Foreman – Wet Tropics mountains of north-eastern Qld endemic
- Triunia robusta (C.T.White) Foreman – south-east Qld restricted endemic
- Triunia youngiana (C.Moore & F.Muell.) L.A.S.Johnson & Briggs – north-east NSW to south-east Qld endemic (type species)

== Description ==
The members of the genus grow as shrubs to small trees, with simple green obovate to elliptical leaves and new growth covered in reddish hairs. The flowers are fragrant and arranged in terminal racemes. Flowers are followed by small round red fruit, which are highly toxic. The seeds are round.

== Habitat and ecology ==
The four species grow naturally only in eastern Australia between Dorrigo in mid-northern New South Wales and the Wet Tropics rainforests region of north-eastern Queensland. They grow in uplands and mountains rainforests, where they form part of the understorey. Two species grow naturally in south-eastern Queensland and one of them grows further southwards through to north-eastern New South Wales. Two other species are only known to grow about 1,500 km (930 mi) to the north in the uplands and mountains rainforests of the Wet Tropics region of north-eastern Queensland.

== Cultivation ==
In cultivation, all four species grow into garden shrubs with attractive foliage, flowers and fruit, and can tolerate heavy shade to full sun. They require fair to good soil drainage and can be propagated by seed or cutting.
