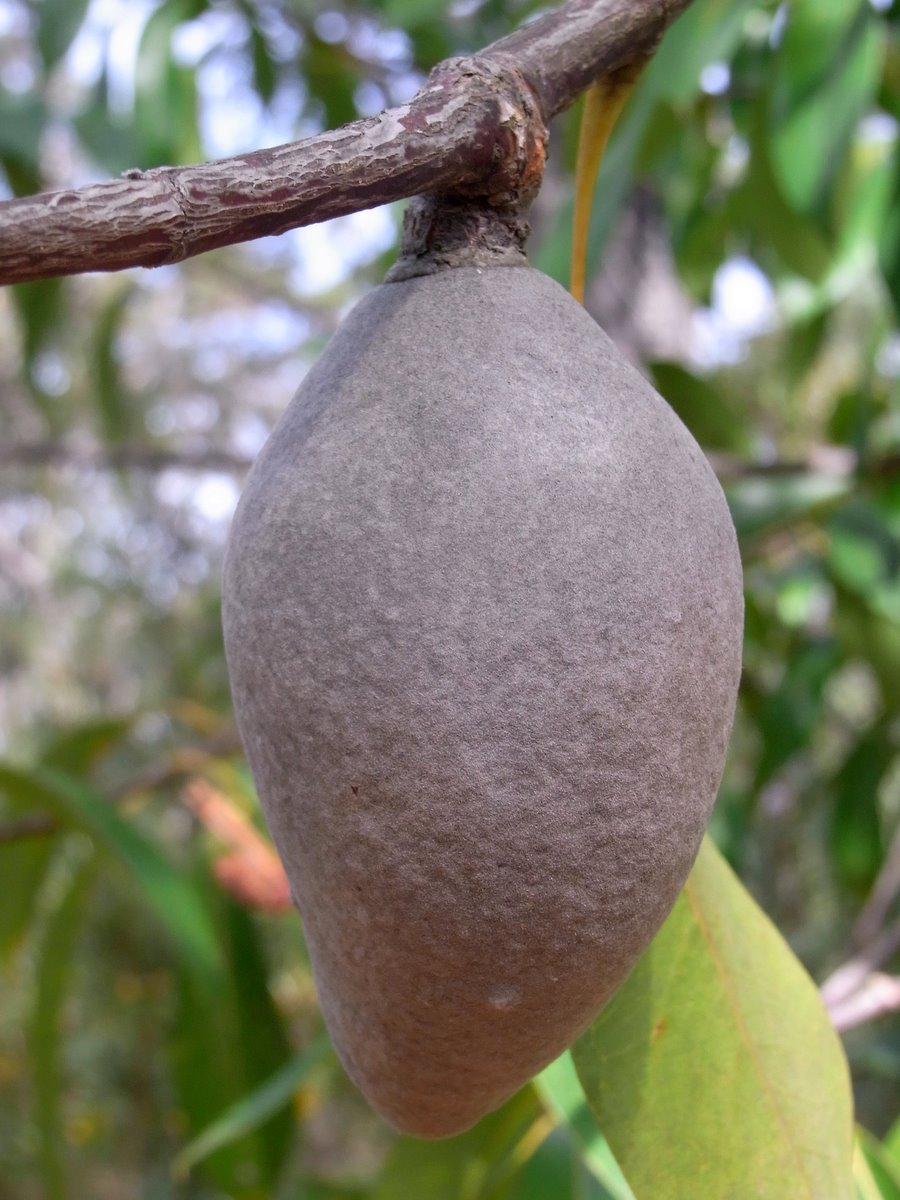
- Woody pear at Muogamarra Nature Reserve, Australia

Scientific classification
- Kingdom: Plantae
- Clade: Tracheophytes
- Clade: Angiosperms
- Clade: Eudicots
- Order: Proteales
- Family: Proteaceae
- Genus: Xylomelum
- Species: X. pyriforme

Binomial name
- Xylomelum pyriforme (Gaertn.) Knight

= Xylomelum pyriforme =

Woody pear

Species of plant native to eastern Australia

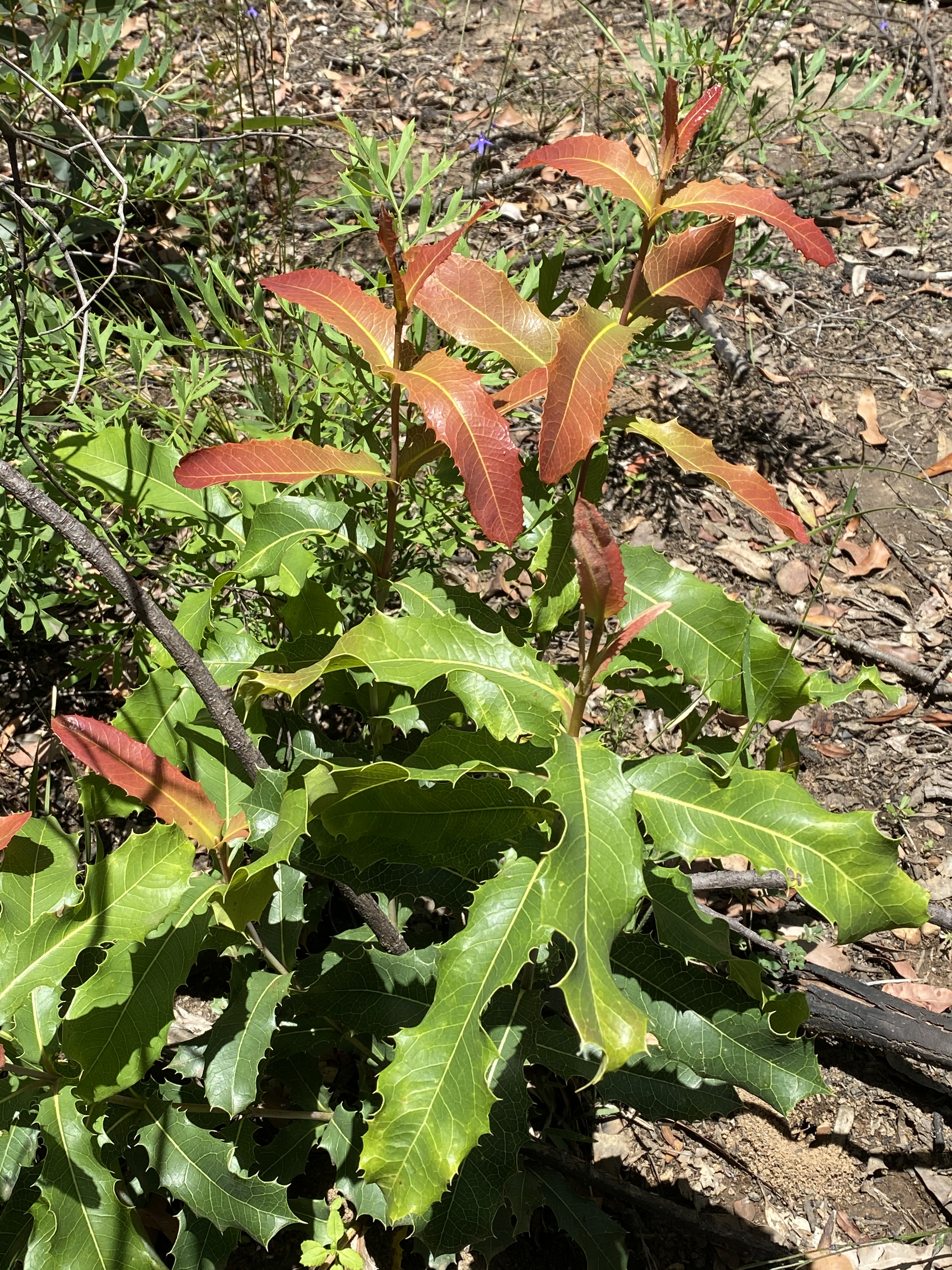
New growth after a bushfire

Xylomelum pyriforme, commonly known as the woody pear, is a species of plant in the family Proteaceae native to eastern Australia. It grows as a large shrub or small tree to five metres high.

== Taxonomy ==
Xylomelum pyriforme was first documented at Botany Bay in 1770 by Joseph Banks and Daniel Solander, who gave it the (unpublished) binomial name Leucadendroides pyrifera in Banks' Florilegium. It was first formally described as Banksia pyriformis by German botanist Joseph Gaertner in 1788 in De Fructibus et Seminibus Plantarum. It was given its current name in 1809 by the gardener Joseph Knight in his On the cultivation of the plants belonging to the natural order of Proteeae. The species name "pear-shaped" is derived from the Latin words pyrus "pear" and forma "shape".

== Description ==
Xylomelum pyriforme grows as a large shrub or small tree, usually reaching 4–5 m (13–16 ft) high, although trees to 15 m (49 ft) have been recorded in the Howes Valley northwest of Sydney. The large juvenile leaves have dentate (toothed) margins with 6 to 11 teeth along each edge, while the adult leaves have entire margins. The prominently veined leaves measure 10 to 20 cm (3.9 to 7.9 in) and are up to 5 cm (2.0 in) wide. They are glabrous (smooth) and dark green. New growth is covered in a fine rust-coloured fur. Flowering takes place from September to November, peaking in October. The inflorescences measure 5 to 8 cm (2.0 to 3.1 in) and are rusty coloured. Flowers are followed by the development of the large, woody, pear-shaped seed pod which is up to 9 cm (3.5 in) long and 5 cm (2.0 in) wide.

== Distribution and habitat ==
The plant's range is from the New South Wales mid-north coast south to Mittagong, with an outlying record from the vicinity of Cooma. Xylomelum pyriforme grows on plateau and ridges in nutrient-poor well-drained sandstone soils in open eucalypt woodland. It is associated with such species as yellow bloodwood (Corymbia eximia), red bloodwood (C. gummifera), scribbly gum (Eucalyptus haemastoma), silvertop ash (E. sieberi), brown stringybark (E. capitellata), grey gum (E. punctata) and scribbly gum (E. sclerophylla).

== Ecology ==
Xylomelum pyriforme regenerates from a lignotuber or epicormic buds after bushfires, and can sucker from the roots. It is one of a number of Australian species that require a fire to open and disperse their seeds.

The fungus Giugnardia causes leaf spot, while Cephaleutos virescens is responsible for an algal leaf spot.

== Cultivation and uses ==
Rarely seen in cultivation due to the scarcity of seed, Xylomelum pyriforme seedlings grow readily but commonly quickly succumb to damping off. A plant may take 20 years to reach flowering stage from seed.

Early European settlers of Australia used the tree's wood to make gun stocks.

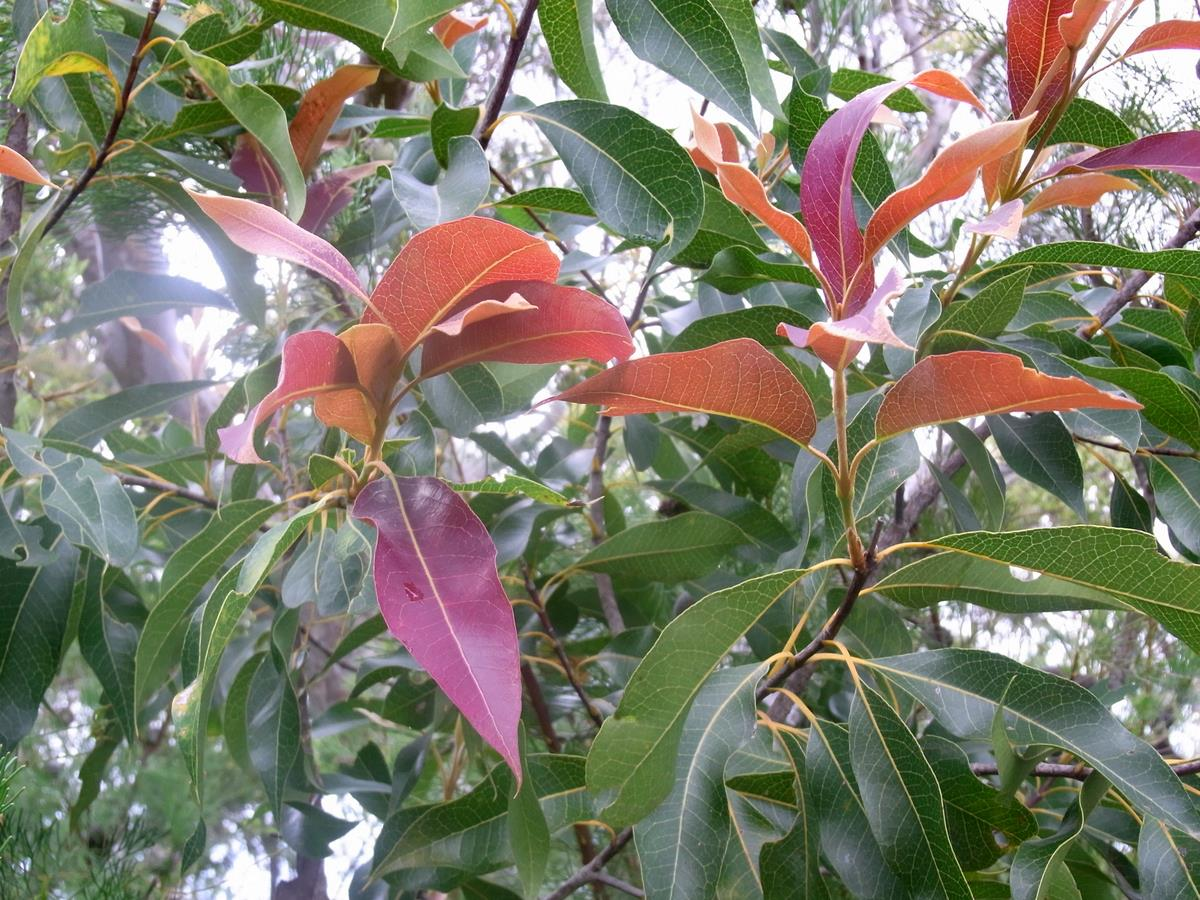
New leaves

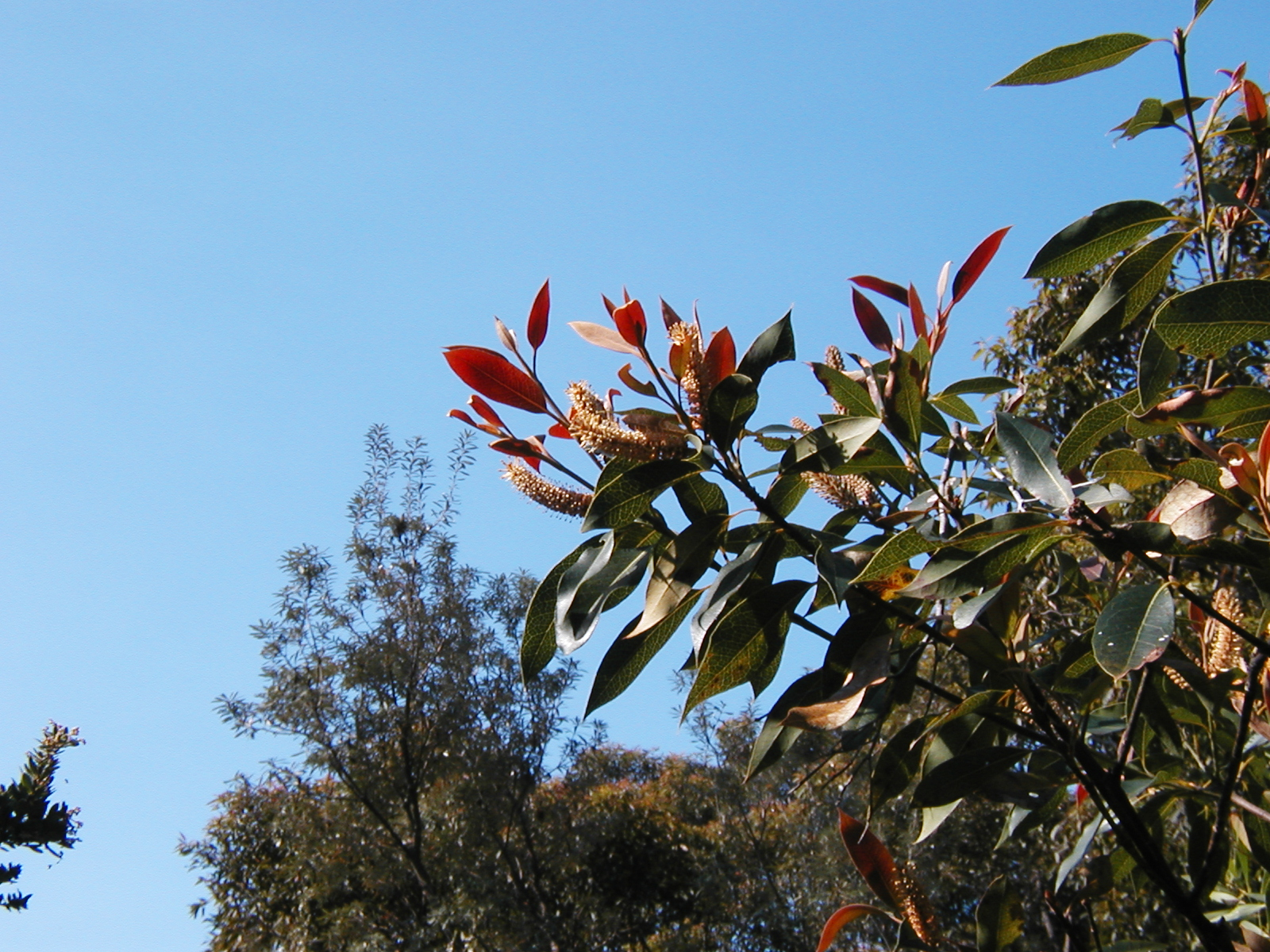
Habit

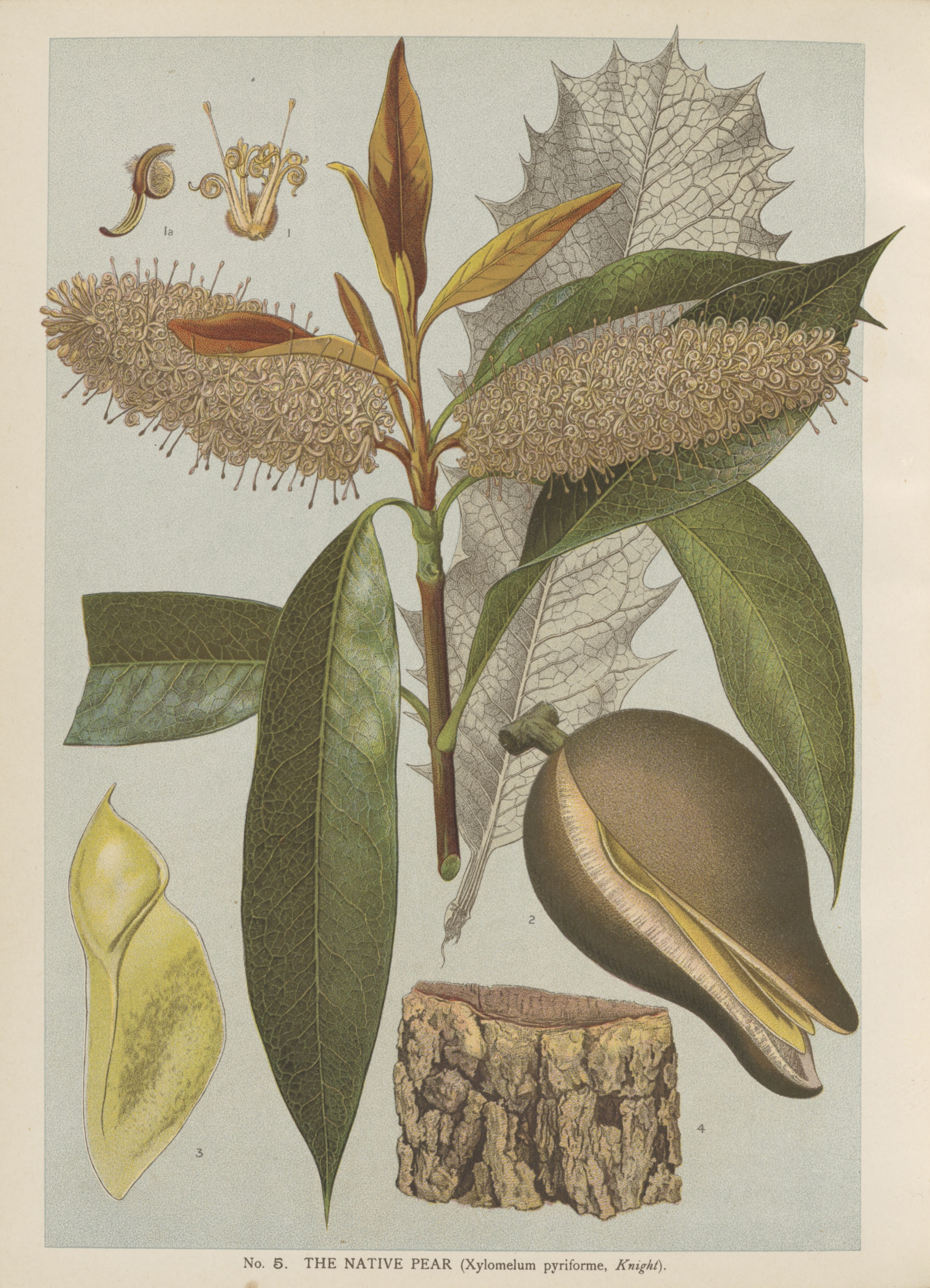
Illustration by Edward Minchen
