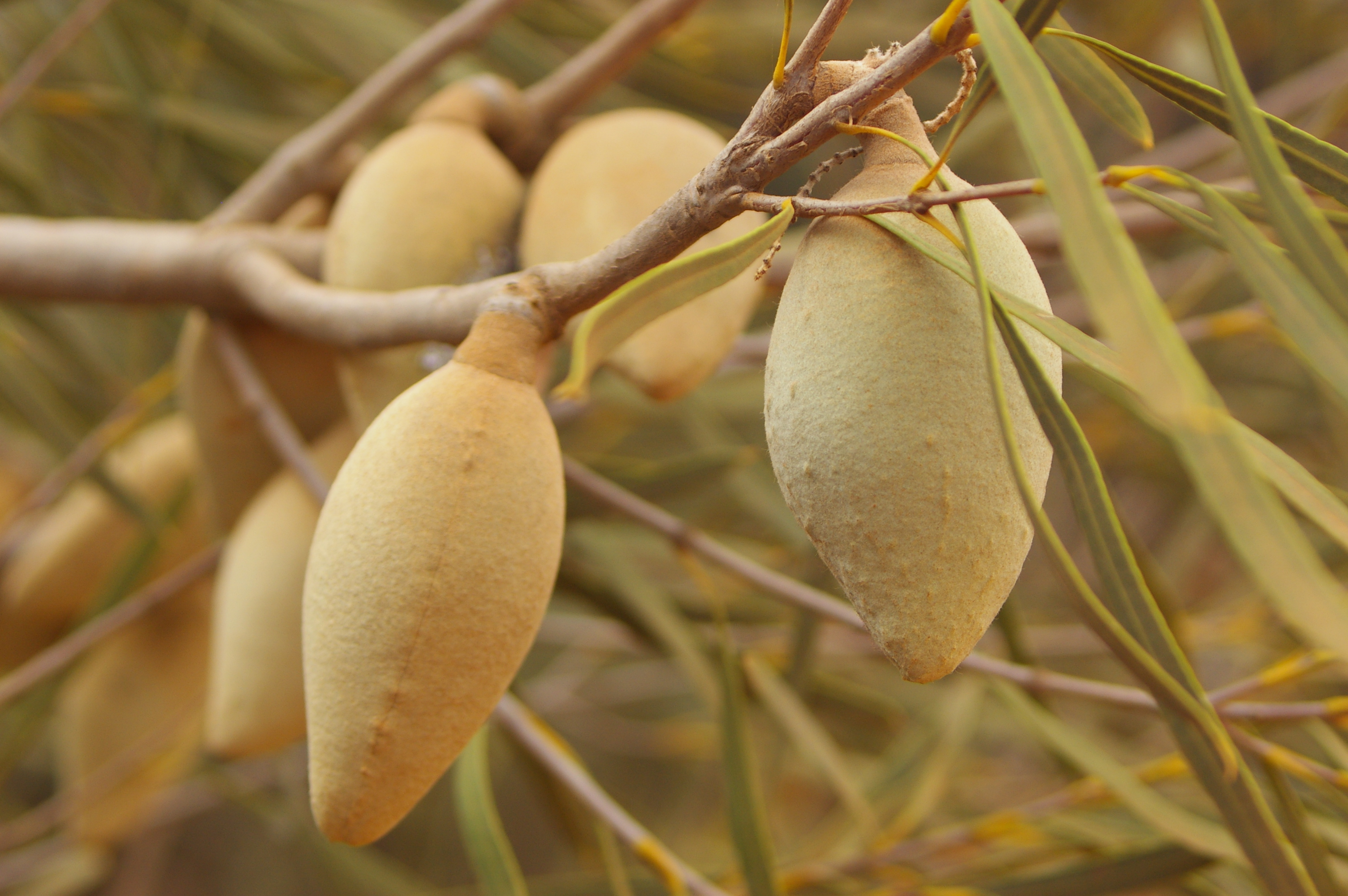

Scientific classification
- Kingdom: Plantae
- Clade: Tracheophytes
- Clade: Angiosperms
- Clade: Eudicots
- Order: Proteales
- Family: Proteaceae
- Genus: Xylomelum
- Species: X. angustifolium

Binomial name
- Xylomelum angustifolium Meisn.

= Xylomelum angustifolium =

Sandplain woody pear

Species of tree endemic to Western Australia

Xylomelum angustifolium, the sandplain woody pear, is a tree species in the family Proteaceae, endemic to Western Australia. A mature Xylomelum angustifolium grows from 2 to 7 metres (6.6 to 23 ft), though trees up to 10 m (33 ft) have been observed. Produces cream flowers between December and February though flowering can commence as early as September in its northern range.
