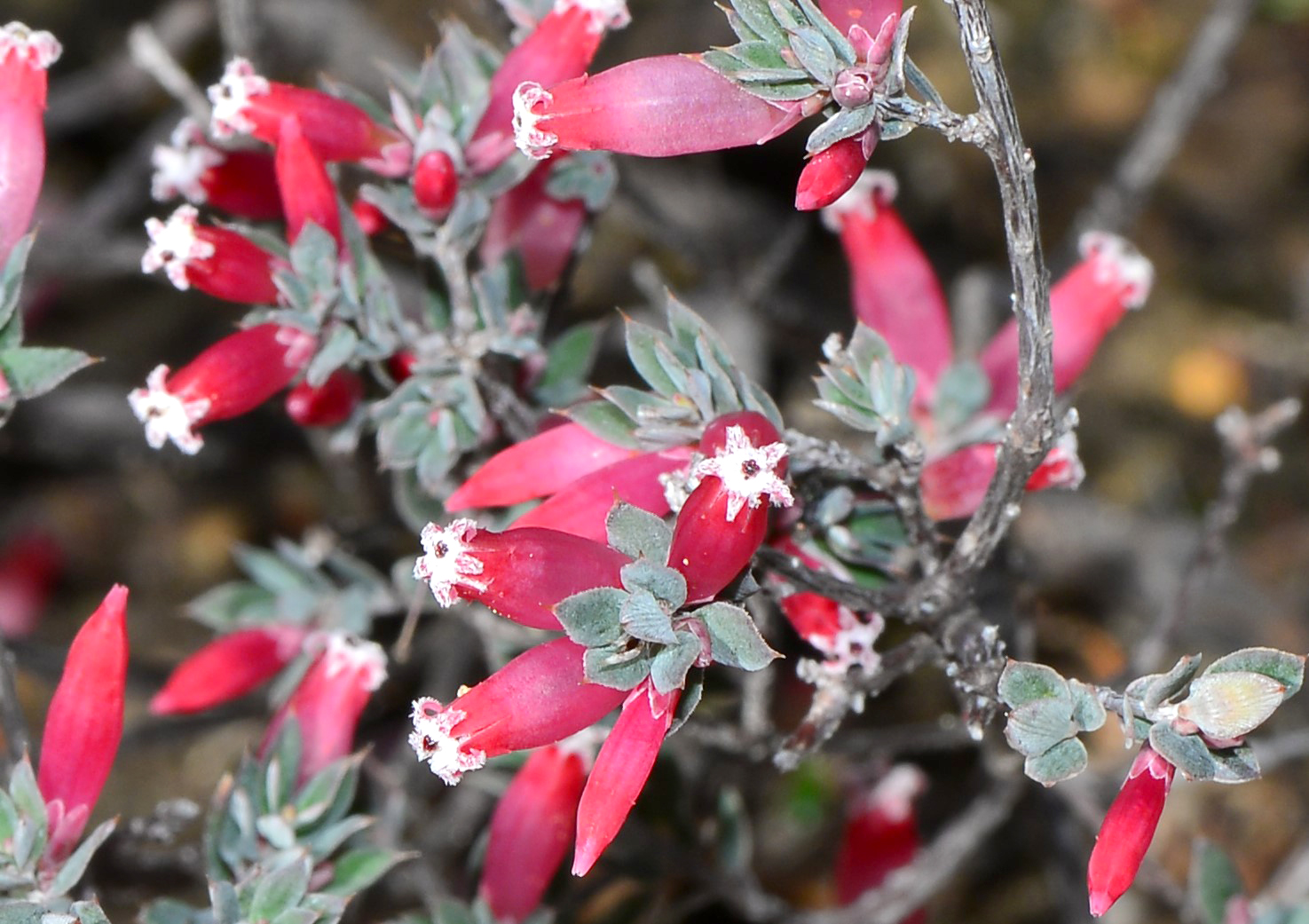

Scientific classification
- Kingdom: Plantae
- Clade: Tracheophytes
- Clade: Angiosperms
- Clade: Eudicots
- Clade: Asterids
- Order: Ericales
- Family: Ericaceae
- Genus: Styphelia
- Species: S. stricta

Binomial name
- Styphelia stricta (Benth.) F.Muell.

= Styphelia stricta =

Species of flowering plant

Styphelia stricta is a small plant in the family Ericaceae. It is endemic to Western Australia.

The species was described in 1868 as Leucopogon strictus by George Bentham. In 1882, Ferdinand von Mueller transferred it to the genus, Styphelia, to give the name accepted by the Western Australian Herbarium, (because of the phylogenetic study by Darren Crayn and others). This name is not accepted by CHAH, nor yet by Plants of the World Online.

It is found in the IBRA regions of Jarrah Forest and the Swan Coastal Plain.

== Description ==
Bentham describes it:

An erect rigid shrub, glabrous or uearly so. Leaves erect, oblong-lanceolate, tapering into a short rigid point, flat or very slightly convex, finely veined and often glaucous or whitish underneath, under ½ in. long. Peduncles axillary, exceedingly short, bearing 1 or 2 erect flowers usually longer than the leaf. Bracts very small; bracteoles very obtuse, about half as long as the calyx. Sepals about 1 line long, obtuse, often coloured at the end. Corolla-tube about 3 lines long, the lobes about 2 iines, erect at the base. Anthers attached near the top, very obtuse, without sterile tips. Hypogynous disk short, truncate. Ovary 5-angled, 5-celled; style long and slender.
W. Australia. Between Perth and King George's Sound, Harvey; between Moore and Murchison rivers, Drummond, 6th Coll. n. 123. The specimens much resemble those of the eastern L. Mitchellii, with similar long flowers, but the calyx is much smaller, besides other minor differences.
