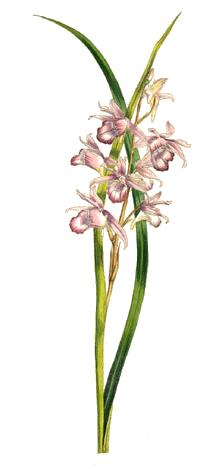
- Phaius rosellus 1847 illustration

Scientific classification
- Kingdom: Plantae
- Clade: Tracheophytes
- Clade: Angiosperms
- Clade: Monocots
- Order: Asparagales
- Family: Orchidaceae
- Subfamily: Epidendroideae
- Tribe: Collabieae
- Genus: Phaius; Lour.

Synonyms
- Cyanorchis Thouars; Gastorchis Thouars; Hecabe Raf.; Pachyne Salisb.; Tankervillia Link; Limatodis Blume; Pesomeria Lindl.; Phajus Hassk.; Paraphaius J.W.Zhai & F.W.Xing

= Phaius =

Swamp orchids

Genus of orchids

Phaius, commonly known as swamp orchids or in Chinese as 鶴頂蘭屬/鹤顶兰属 (he ding lan shu), is a genus of forty-five species of flowering plants in the orchid family, Orchidaceae. They are evergreen, terrestrial herbs which form clumps with crowded, sometimes stem-like pseudobulbs, large, pleated leaves and relatively large, often colourful flowers. Species in this genus are found in the tropical parts of Africa, Asia, Southeast Asia, New Guinea, Australia, and various islands of the Pacific and Indian Oceans. One species is also naturalized in Hawaii, Florida, and the Caribbean.

== Description ==
Orchids in the genus Phaius are evergreen, terrestrial, sympodial herbs with thin underground rhizomes and crowded above ground, sometimes stem-like pseudobulbs. There are several pleated, stalked leaves emerging from the pseudobulb. The flower stalk is unbranched and bears a few to many moderately large, resupinate, often colourful flowers. The sepals and petals are similar in size and shape and the labellum has three lobes and a shallow pouch near its base.

== Taxonomy and naming ==
The genus Phaius was first formally described in 1790 by João de Loureiro and the description was published in his book Flora Cochinchinensis. The specific epithet (Phaius) is derived from the Ancient Greek word phaios meaning "dusky" or "brown", referring to the brownish colour of the flowers of many species in this genus.

=== List of species ===
The following is a list of Phaius species recognised by Plants of the World Online as of September 2023:

- Phaius amboinensis Blume (1856)
- Phaius baconii J.J.Wood & Shim (1994)
- Phaius borneensis J.J.Sm. (1903)
- Phaius callosus (Blume) Lindl. (1831)
- Phaius columnaris C.Z.Tang & S.J.Chen (1985)
- Phaius cooperi Rolfe (1858)
- Phaius corymbioides Schltr. (1911)
- Phaius daenikeri Kraenzl. (1929)
- Phaius ecalcaratus J.J.Sm., (1911)
- Phaius flavus (Blume) Lindl., (1831)
- Phaius grandiflorus (Nadeaud) Govaerts (2011)
- Phaius gratus Blume (1856)
- Phaius hainanensis C.Z.Tang & S.J.Chen (1982)
- Phaius hekouensis Tsukaya, M.Nakaj. & S.K.Wu (2010)
- Phaius indigofer Hassk. (1842)
- Phaius indochinensis Seidenf. & Ormerod (1995)
- Phaius labiatus J.J.Sm. (1920)
- Phaius landyae P.J.Cribb & J.V.Stone (2017)
- Phaius leonidii P.J.Cribb & J.V.Stone (2017)
- Phaius longicornu Guillaumin (1957)
- Phaius luridus Thwaites (1861)
- Phaius lyonii Ames (1915)
- Phaius mannii Rchb.f. (1881)
- Phaius mishmensis (Lindl. & Paxton) Rchb.f. (1857)
- Phaius montanus Schltr. (1912)
- Phaius nanus Hook.f. (1890)
- Phaius occidentalis Schltr. (1903)
- Phaius pauciflorus (Blume) Blume (1856)
  - Phaius pauciflorus var. pallidus (Ridl.) Holttum (1947)
  - Phaius pauciflorus subsp. pauciflorus
  - Phaius pauciflorus var. punctatus (Lindl.) J.J.Sm. (1920)
  - Phaius pauciflorus subsp. sabahensis J.J.Wood & A.L.Lamb (1993)
  - Phaius pauciflorus var. sumatranus J.J.Sm. (1920)
- Phaius philippinensis N.E.Br. (1889)
- Phaius pictus T.E.Hunt (1952) (accepted by Council of Heads of Australasian Herbaria)
- Phaius pulchellus Kraenzl. (1882)
  - Phaius pulchellus var. ambrensis Bosser (1971)
  - Phaius pulchellus var. andrambovatensis Bosser (1971)
  - Phaius pulchellus var. pulchellus
  - Phaius pulchellus var. sandrangatensis Bosser (1971)
- Phaius reflexipetalus J.J.Wood & Shim (1994)
- Phaius robertsii F.Muell. (1883)
- Phaius stenocentron Schltr. (1911)
- Phaius subtrilobus Ames & C.Schweinf. (1920)
- Phaius takeoi (Hayata) H.J.Su (1989)
- Phaius tankervilleae (Banks ex L'Hér.) Blume (1856)
  - Phaius tankervilleae var. antoninae (P.Balzer) J.V.Stone & P.J.Cribb (2017)
  - Phaius tankervilleae var. australis (F.Muell.) J.V.Stone & P.J.Cribb (2017)
  - Phaius tankervilleae var. baolocensis (Duy, Tao Chen & D.X.Zhang) J.V.Stone & P.J.Cribb (2017)
  - Phaius tankervilleae var. bernaysii (F.Muell. ex Rchb.f.) J.V.Stone & P.J.Cribb (2017)
  - Phaius tankervilleae var. devogelii J.V.Stone & P.J.Cribb (2017)
  - Phaius tankervilleae var. tankervilleae
- Phaius tenuis Rchb.f. (1857)
- Phaius tetragonus (Thouars) Rchb.f. (1855)
- Phaius tonkinensis (Aver.) Aver. (2005)
- Phaius trichoneurus Schltr. (1925)
- Phaius wallichii Lindl. (1831)
- Phaius wenshanensis F.Y.Liu (1991)

== Distribution ==
Orchids in the genus Phaius are found in tropical Africa, India, tropical and subtropical China, Malaysia, the Philippines, Indonesia, New Guinea, New Caledonia, Polynesia and Australia. Nine species, four of which are endemic, occur in China and three species including two endemics are found in Australia. The Australian species are found in Queensland, the Northern Territory and New South Wales.
