= Robertsii =

Robertsii may refer to:

- Cooktownia robertsii, species of plant
- Dasymys robertsii, species of rodent
- Metarhizium robertsii, species of fungus
- Ophiocordyceps robertsii, species of fungus
- Phaius robertsii, species of plant
