= Calanthe tankervilleae =

Swamp orchid
- Calanthe tankervilleae growing on Lanai

Scientific classification
- Kingdom: Plantae
- Clade: Tracheophytes
- Clade: Angiosperms
- Clade: Monocots
- Order: Asparagales
- Family: Orchidaceae
- Subfamily: Epidendroideae
- Genus: Calanthe
- Species: C. tankervilleae

Binomial name
- Calanthe tankervilleae (Banks) M.W.Chase, Christenh. & Schuit.

Synonyms
- Bletia tankervilleae (Banks) R.Br.; Limodorum incarvillei Pers. nom. superfl.; Limodorum tankervilleae Banks; Phaius incarvillei Kuntze nom. superfl.; Phaius tankervilleae (Banks) Blume

Species of orchid

Calanthe tankervilleae, commonly known as the greater swamp-orchid, swamp lily, swamp orchid, nun's-hood orchid, nun's orchid, veiled orchid, Lady Tankerville's swamp orchid or 鹤顶兰 (he ding lan), is a species of orchid native to areas from Asia to islands in the Pacific Ocean. It has large, pleated leaves and tall flowering stems bearing up to twenty five white, brown, mauve and yellow flowers. It was named for Lady Tankerville who was the first person to make the orchid flower successfully in England. It was the first tropical orchid to flower in England.

== Description ==
Calanthe tankervilleae is an evergreen, terrestrial herb that has cone shaped or more or less spherical pseudobulbs mostly 60–80 mm (2–3 in) long and 30–60 mm (1–2 in) wide. Between two and eight pleated linear to lance-shaped leaves 300–1,000 mm (10–40 in) long and 80–200 mm (3–8 in) wide develop from the pseudobulb. Between ten and twenty five resupinate flowers 70–125 mm (3–5 in) wide are borne on a flowering stem 500–2,000 mm (20–80 in) tall. The flowers are whitish on the outside and reddish brown inside. The sepals and petals are oblong to lance-shaped, 40–65 mm (2–3 in) long and 10–15 mm (0.4–0.6 in) wide. The labellum is pink or reddish with a white tip and white stripes inside, 35–60 mm (1–2 in) long and 20–50 mm (0.8–2 in) wide with three lobes. The middle lobe is more or less tube-shaped and the side lobes have wavy or crinkled edges. There is a whitish yellow spur 5–10 mm (0.2–0.4 in) long near the base of the labellum and a narrow raised callus in its centre. Flowering occurs from September to November in Australia and from March to June in Asia.

== Taxonomy and naming ==
In 1778, John Fothergill sent specimens of this orchid back from China to England and in 1788, after one had flowered, Joseph Banks formally described the species, giving it the name Limodorum tankervilleae. In 2020, Mark Wayne Chase, Maarten J. M. Christenhusz and André Schuiteman changed the name to Calanthe tankervilleae in the journal Phytotaxa. The specific epithet (tankervilleae) honours Lady Emma Tankerville, as the orchid had flowered in her greenhouse at Walton-on-Thames near London. It was the first tropical orchid to flower in England.

Other spellings of the specific epithet are sometimes used. When Charles Louis L'Héritier de Brutelle published his book Sertum Anglicum and cited Joseph Banks' name for this species, he Latinised it to Limodorum tancarvilleae. As a result, some authorities, including the Australian Plant Census, list the species as Phaius tancervilleae. The spellings P. tankervilliae and P. tankarvilliae have also been used.

In 2017, Judi Stone and Phillip James Cribb published a monograph entitled Lady Tankerville's Legacy - A Historical and Monographic Review of Phaius and Gastrorchis, in which they described six varieties of Phaius tankervilleae:

- Phaius tankervilleae var. antoninae (P.Balzer) J.V.Stone & P.J.Cribb (2017)
- Phaius tankervilleae var. australis (F.Muell.) J.V.Stone & P.J.Cribb (2017)
- Phaius tankervilleae var. baolocensis (Duy, Tao Chen & D.X.Zhang) J.V.Stone & P.J.Cribb (2017)
- Phaius tankervilleae var. bernaysii (F.Muell. ex Rchb.f.) J.V.Stone & P.J.Cribb (2017)
- Phaius tankervilleae var. devogelii J.V.Stone & P.J.Cribb (2017)
- Phaius tankervilleae var. tankervilleae

== Distribution and habitat ==
Calanthe tankervilleae grows in swampy forest or grassland. It is found in the Indian subcontinent, New Guinea, China, Japan, Southeast Asia, Indonesia, Malaysia, the Philippines, Australia and certain islands of the Pacific. It is also naturalised in Hawaii, Panama, the West Indies and Florida.

In Australia it is found as P. tankervilleae var. australis as far south as Yamba, New South Wales. and further north in tropical Queensland. While rare in parts of its native habitat, it is present in other parts of the world as a naturalised species, including Hawaii and Florida.

== Conservation status ==
Phaius tankervilleae var. australis, as Phaius australis, is listed as endangered with possible extinction within the country. It is threatened by trampling by stock, and by illegal collecting, weeds and drainage of its habitat.

== Gallery ==
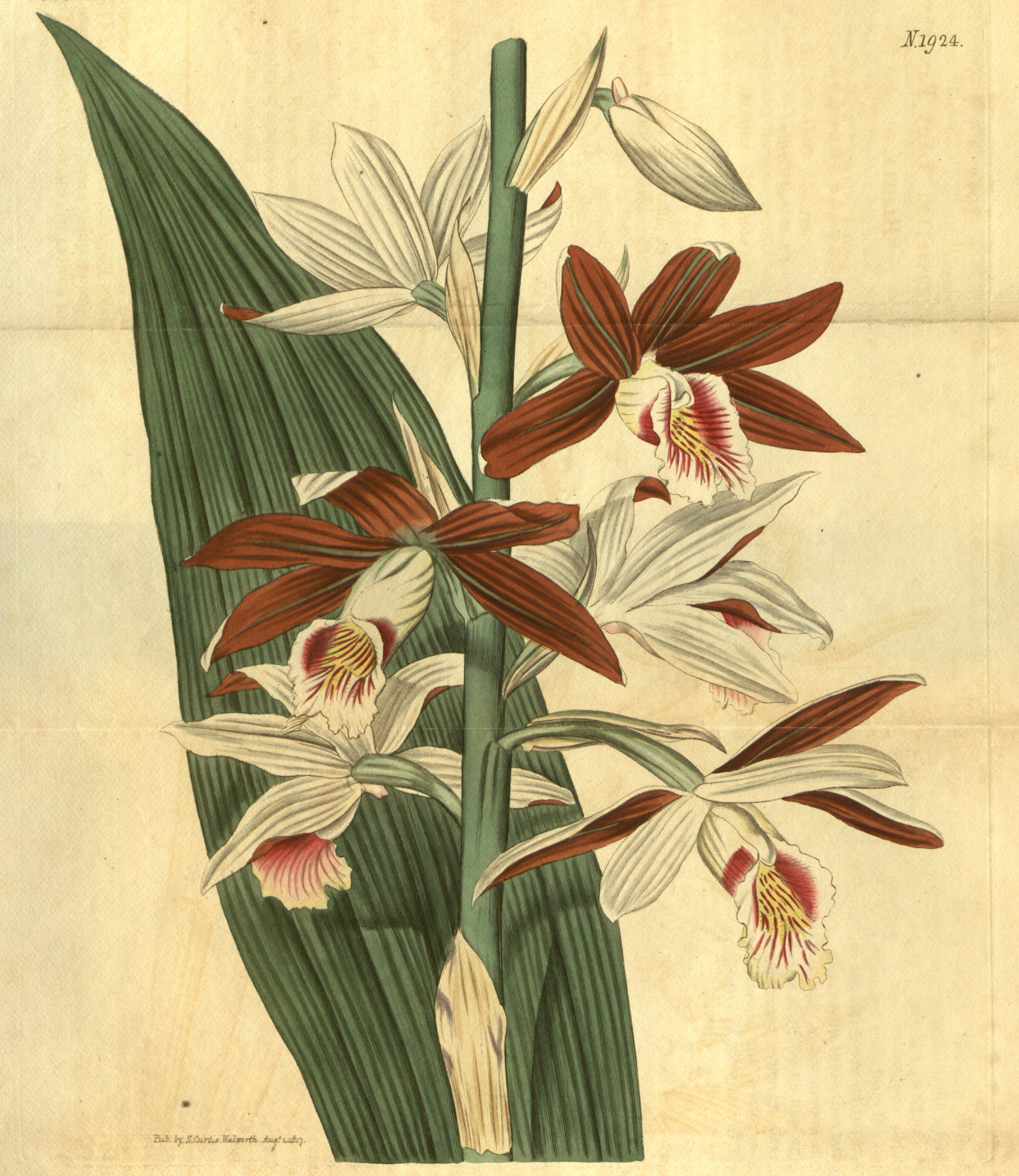
Illustration from Curtis Botanical Magazine, 1924

Inflorescence of Calanthe tankervilleae

Flowers of Calanthe tankervilleae
