= Pterostylis timorensis =

Scientific classification
- Kingdom: Plantae
- Clade: Tracheophytes
- Clade: Angiosperms
- Clade: Monocots
- Order: Asparagales
- Family: Orchidaceae
- Subfamily: Orchidoideae
- Tribe: Cranichideae
- Genus: Pterostylis
- Species: P. timorensis

Binomial name
- Pterostylis timorensis Schuit. & J.J.Verm.

Species of plant

Pterostylis timorensis is a plant in the orchid family Orchidaceae and is endemic to East Timor. Both flowering and non-flowering plants have a rosette of light green, fleshy leaves. Flowering plants have a single green, white and reddish-brown flower and two or three stem leaves.

== Description ==
Pterostylis timorensis, is a terrestrial, perennial, deciduous, herb with an underground tuber. Plants have a rosette of three or four bright, dark green leaves, each leaf 25–40 mm (1–2 in) long and 9–22 mm (0.4–0.9 in) wide with a petiole 5–13 mm (0.2–0.5 in) long. Flowering plants have a single green, white and reddish-brown flower about 25 mm (0.98 in) long on a flowering stem 55–85 mm (2–3 in) high. The dorsal sepal and petals are joined to form a hood called the "galea" over the column. The galea is white with green and reddish-brown lines. There is a narrow gap between the galea and the lateral sepals which are joined for 8 mm (0.3 in) and have erect, narrow tips a further 13 mm (0.5 in) long. The sinus between the lateral sepals is V-shaped and the labellum is about 9 mm (0.4 in) long, 5 mm (0.2 in) wide and not visible outside the intact flower.

== Taxonomy and naming ==
Pterostylis timorensis was first formally described in 2008 by André Schuiteman and Jaap J. Vermeulen from a specimen collected on Monte Mundo Perdido and the description was published in the Botanical Journal of the Linnean Society. The specific epithet (timorensis) refers to the distribution of this species with the Latin suffix -ensis meaning "place for" or "where".

== Distribution and habitat ==
This greenhood grows in montane forest at altitudes of about 1,280 m (4,000 ft).
