= G. nivalis =

G. nivalis may refer to:

- Galanthus nivalis, a medicinal plant species
- Galeandra nivalis, an orchid species
- Gentiana nivalis, a flowering plant species
- Glechoma nivalis, a mint species
