= APNI =

APNI, Apni, or variants, may refer to:

- Alliance Party of Northern Ireland
- Australian Plant Name Index
- Jammu and Kashmir Apni Party
