= G. juncea =

G. juncea may refer to:

- Galeandra juncea, a tropical orchid
- Galvezia juncea, a plant native to Mexico
- Genista juncea, a plant with very small leaves
