= Hecabe =

Hecabe can refer to:

- Hecabe, Latin Hecuba, a Trojan queen, wife of Priam and mother of Hector
- Hecabe, one of the Danaïdes, who married and murdered Dryas
- An orchid related to the genus Phaius
