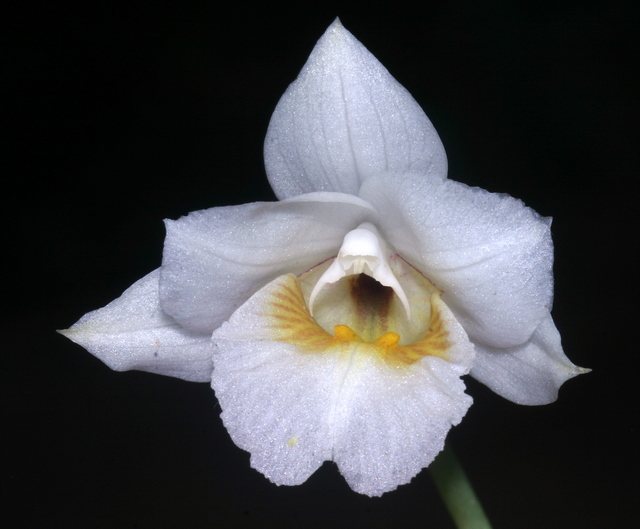

Scientific classification
- Kingdom: Plantae
- Clade: Tracheophytes
- Clade: Angiosperms
- Clade: Monocots
- Order: Asparagales
- Family: Orchidaceae
- Subfamily: Epidendroideae
- Genus: Phaius
- Species: P. stenocentron

Binomial name
- Phaius stenocentron Schltr.

Synonyms
- Calanthe stenocentron (Schltr.) M.W.Chase, Christenh. & Schuit.; Phaius fragilis L.O.Williams

= Phaius stenocentron =

Species of orchid

Phaius stenocentron is a species of orchid that is native to the Philippines and Sulawesi. It was first formally described in 1911 by Rudolf Schlechter in Repertorium specierum novarum regni vegetabilis.
