= Minax =

Minax may refer to:

- Minax, a brand name of the cardiovascular drug metoprolol
- Minax (Ultima), the Ultima game character

== Species names ==
- Austracantha minax, an Australian spider
- Bulbophyllum minax, a type of orchid
- Dracula minax, a type of orchid
- Galeandra minax, a type of orchid
