= Schuit =

Schuit may refer to:

- A schuyt, the archaic spelling of schuit
- A Trekschuit
- Schuit., taxonomic author abbreviation of André Schuiteman (born 1960), Dutch botanist
