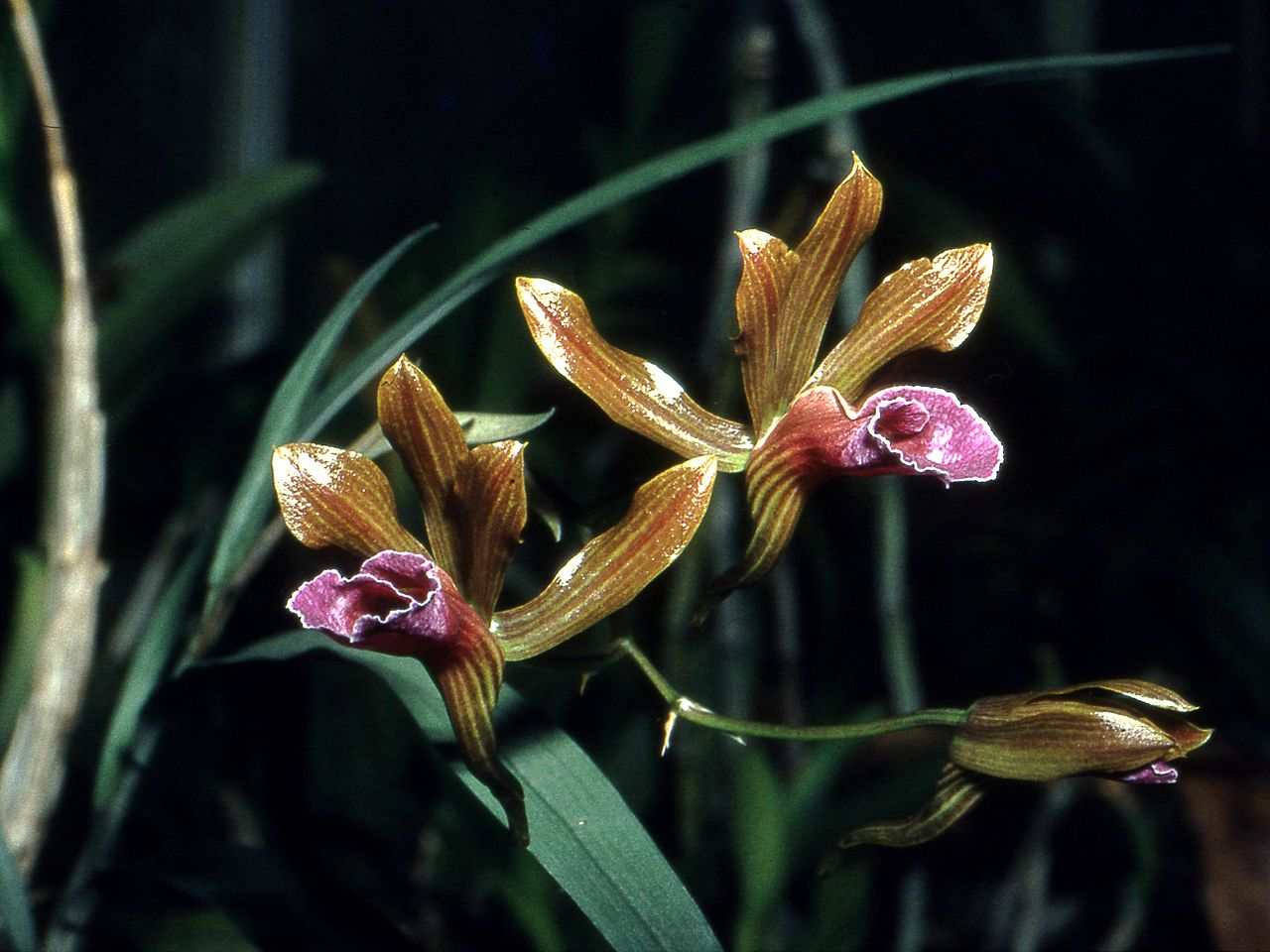

Scientific classification
- Kingdom: Plantae
- Clade: Tracheophytes
- Clade: Angiosperms
- Clade: Monocots
- Order: Asparagales
- Family: Orchidaceae
- Subfamily: Epidendroideae
- Genus: Galeandra
- Species: G. dives

Binomial name
- Galeandra dives Rchb.f. & Warsz.

Synonyms
- Galeandra flaveola Rchb.f.

= Galeandra dives =

Species of orchid

Galeandra dives is a species of orchid. It is native to Costa Rica, French Guiana, Guyana, Suriname, Venezuela and Colombia.
