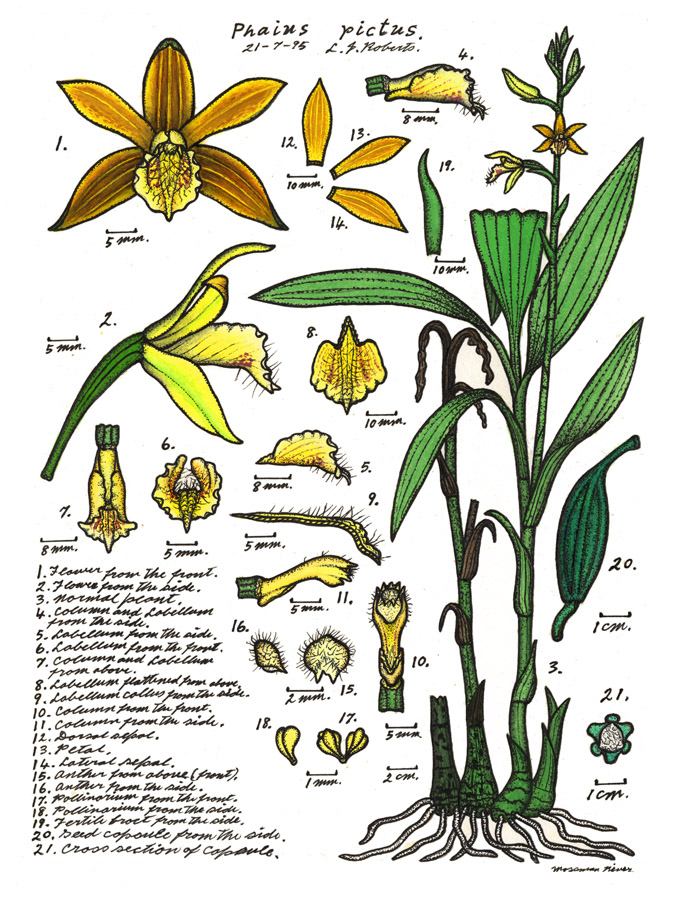
- Illustration by Lewis Roberts

Conservation status
- Vulnerable (EPBC Act)

Scientific classification
- Kingdom: Plantae
- Clade: Tracheophytes
- Clade: Angiosperms
- Clade: Monocots
- Order: Asparagales
- Family: Orchidaceae
- Subfamily: Epidendroideae
- Genus: Phaius
- Species: P. robertsii

Binomial name
- Phaius robertsii F.Muell.

Synonyms
- Phaius monticola Guillaumin; Phaius pictus T.E.Hunt

= Phaius robertsii =

Forest swamp orchid

Species of orchid

Phaius robertsii, commonly known as forest swamp orchid, is a plant in the orchid family and is native to a small area of Tropical North Queensland and to New Caledonia. It is an evergreen, terrestrial herb with above-ground stems, three to five pleated leaves and up to twenty flowers which are yellow on the back and brick-red inside. It grows in wet places in rainforest.

== Description ==
Phaius robertsii is an evergreen, terrestrial herb that has between four and six more or less cylindrical, above-ground stems 400–600 mm (20–20 in) long and 15–20 mm (0.6–0.8 in) wide. There are between three and five pleated leaves on each stem that are 400–700 mm (20–30 in) long and 70–100 mm (3–4 in) wide. Between four and twenty resupinate flowers 40–50 mm (2–2 in) long and wide are borne on a flowering stem 300–900 mm (10–40 in) tall. The flowers are yellow on the back and brick-red inside. The dorsal sepal is 35–42 mm (1–2 in) long, 10–12 mm (0.39–0.47 in) wide and more or less upright. The lateral sepals are a similar length but slightly wider and spread apart from each other. The petals are a similar length to the sepals but narrower and curve forwards. The labellum is yellow, 15–17 mm (0.59–0.67 in) long and 13–15 mm (0.5–0.6 in) wide with wavy edges. There is a complex callus in the centre of the labellum. Flowering occurs from April to June.

== Taxonomy and naming ==
Phaius robertsii was first formally described in 1883 by Ferdinand von Mueller in Southern Science Record. The species was discovered by Edgar Leopold Layard and "came under the horticultural care of Mr. James Roberts, F.R.H.S., in whose conservatory and under whose skillful attention it has lately been blooming here."

Phaius pictus was first formally described in 1952 by Trevor Edgar Hunt in The Victorian Naturalist from a specimen collected on Mount Bellenden Ker. The specific epithet (pictus) is a Latin word meaning "painted" or "coloured".

In 2017, Judi Stone and Phillip James Cribb published a monograph entitled Lady Tankerville's Legacy – A Historical and Monographic Review of Phaius and Gastrorchis and reduced Phaius pictus to a synonym of Phaius robertsii. However, the accepted name for this species according to the Council of Heads of Australasian Herbaria is P. pictus.

== Distribution and habitat ==
In Queensland, the forest swamp orchid is found at altitudes of up to 600 m (2,000 ft) in a relatively small restricted area in the McIlwraith Range, and from the Bloomfield River to the Kirrama Range. It also occurs on the main island of New Caledonia. It prefers humid, sheltered rainforest close to streams or areas of seepage, or among boulders and forest litter.

== Conservation status ==
This species is listed as "vulnerable" by the Australian Commonwealth EPBC Act (under Phaius pictus, the name accepted by the Council of Heads of Australasian Herbaria) and under the Queensland Government Nature Conservation Act 1992.
