= Schuitemania =

Scientific classification
- Kingdom: Plantae
- Clade: Tracheophytes
- Clade: Angiosperms
- Clade: Monocots
- Order: Asparagales
- Family: Orchidaceae
- Subfamily: Orchidoideae
- Tribe: Cranichideae
- Subtribe: Goodyerinae
- Genus: Schuitemania; Ormerod
- Species: S. merrillii

Binomial name
- Schuitemania merrillii (Ames) Ormerod

Synonyms
- Herpysma merrillii Ames; Erythrodes merrillii (Ames) Ames; Kuhlhasseltia halconensis J.J.Wood

Genus of orchids

Schuitemania is a genus of terrestrial orchids spreading by means of underground rhizomes. Only one species is known, Schuitemania merrillii, endemic to the Philippines. Named after Kew orchid specialist and lead botanist for Asia, André Schuiteman.
