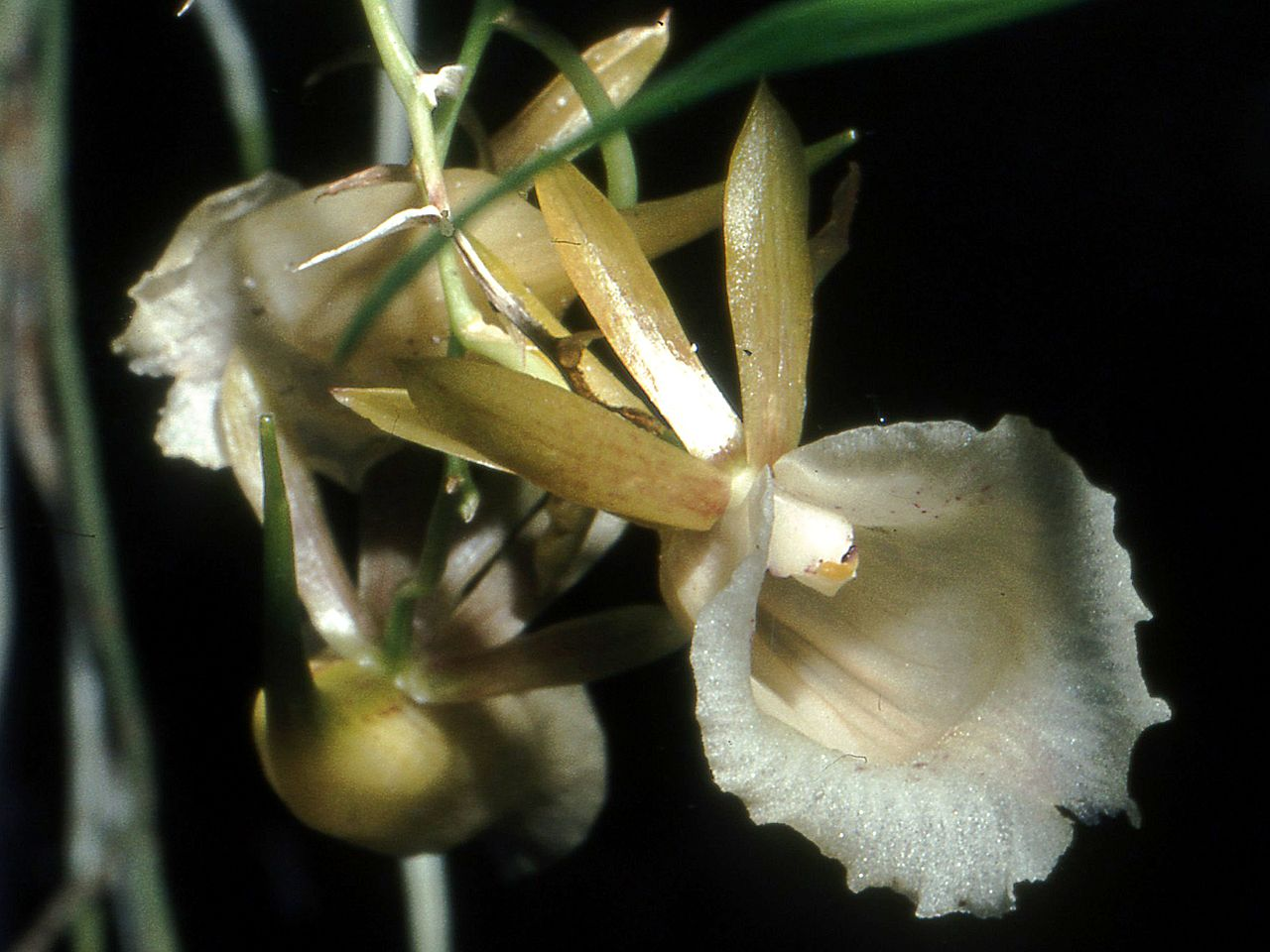

Scientific classification
- Kingdom: Plantae
- Clade: Tracheophytes
- Clade: Angiosperms
- Clade: Monocots
- Order: Asparagales
- Family: Orchidaceae
- Subfamily: Epidendroideae
- Genus: Galeandra
- Species: G. lacustris

Binomial name
- Galeandra lacustris Barb.Rodr.

Synonyms
- Galeandra descagnolleana Rchb.f.

= Galeandra lacustris =

Species of orchid

Galeandra lacustris is a species of orchid native from southern Venezuela to Bolivia.
