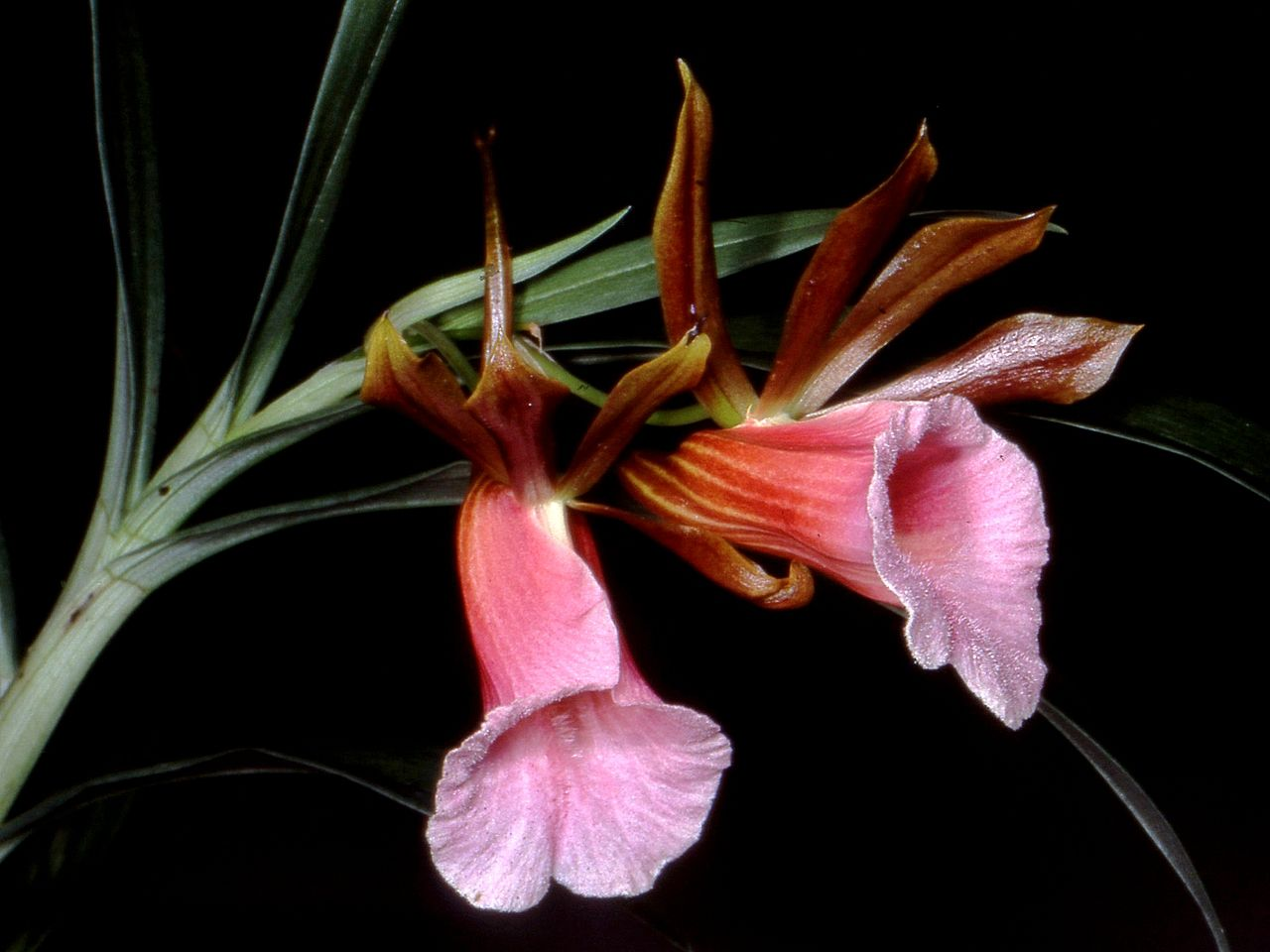

Scientific classification
- Kingdom: Plantae
- Clade: Tracheophytes
- Clade: Angiosperms
- Clade: Monocots
- Order: Asparagales
- Family: Orchidaceae
- Subfamily: Epidendroideae
- Genus: Galeandra
- Species: G. stangeana

Binomial name
- Galeandra stangeana Rchb.f.

Synonyms
- Galeandra barbata Lem.; Galeandra villosa Barb.Rodr.; Galeandra pubicentrum C. Schweinf.

= Galeandra stangeana =

Species of orchid

Galeandra stangeana is a species of orchid. It is native to Brazil, Venezuela, Colombia, Peru and Bolivia.
