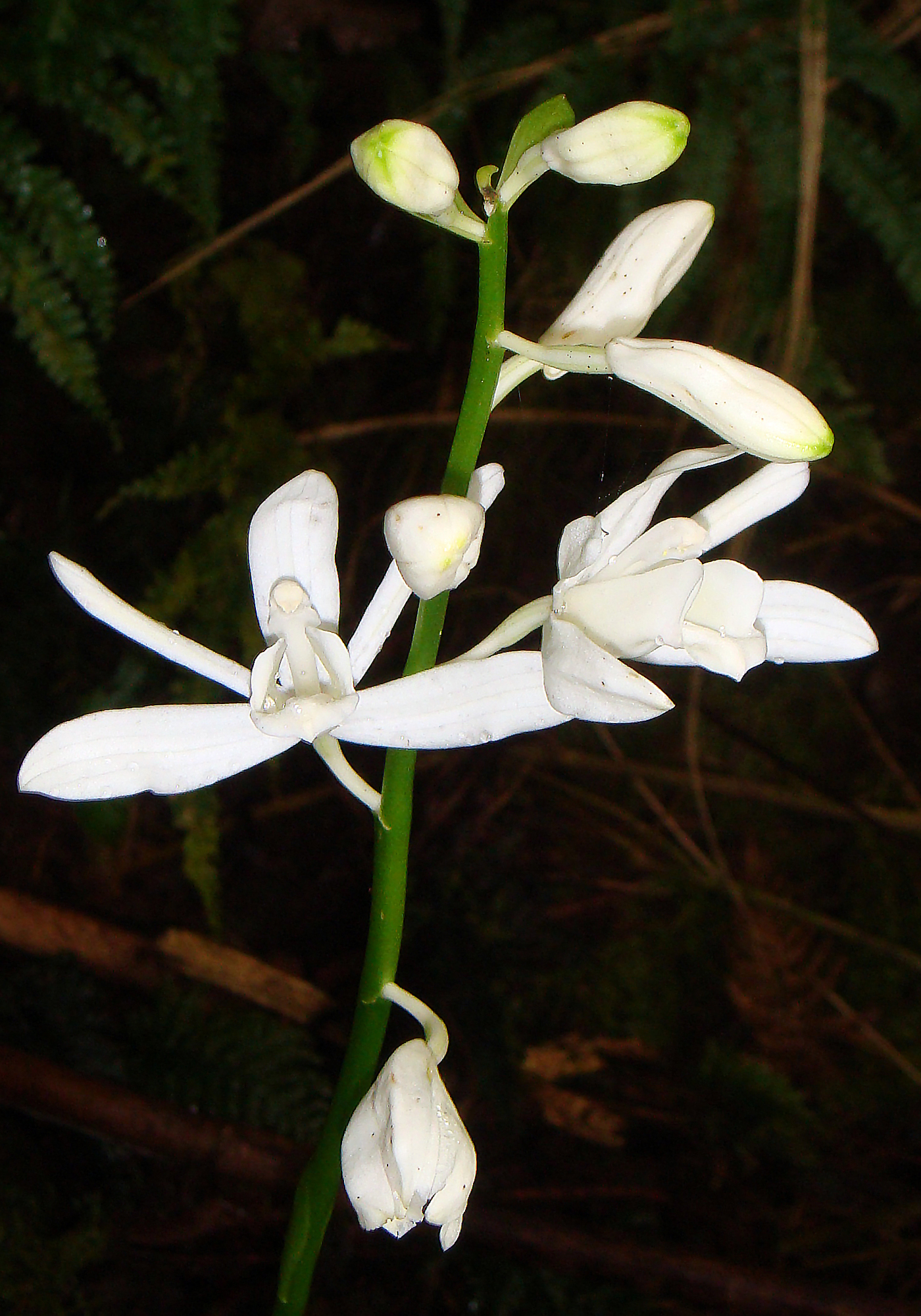
- Pachystoma amboinensis on Rarotonga

Scientific classification
- Kingdom: Plantae
- Clade: Tracheophytes
- Clade: Angiosperms
- Clade: Monocots
- Order: Asparagales
- Family: Orchidaceae
- Subfamily: Epidendroideae
- Genus: Phaius
- Species: P. amboinensis

Binomial name
- Phaius amboinensis Blume

Synonyms
- List: Calanthe amboinensis (Blume) M.W.Chase, Christenh. & Schuit.; Bletia amboinensis Zipp. ex Blume not validly publ.; Epidendrum terrestre L.; Epidendrum tuberosum L. nom. superfl.; Eulophia terrestris (L.) M.W.Chase, Kumar & Schuit.; Geodorum terrestre (L.) Garay; Phaius amboinensis var. papuanus (Schltr.) Schltr.; Phaius graeffei Rchb.f.; Phaius neocaledonicus Rendle; Phaius papuanus Schltr.; Phaius terrestris (L.) Ormerod; Phaius zollingeri Rchb.f.

= Phaius amboinensis =

Arnhem Land swamp orchid

Species of orchid

Phaius amboinensis, commonly known as Arnhem Land swamp orchid, is a plant in the orchid family and is native to areas from Malesia through to New Guinea, Australia and islands in the Pacific Ocean. It is an evergreen, terrestrial herb with up to eight pleated leaves and up to twenty, relatively large white flowers with a yellow labellum. It grows in wet, shady forests.

== Description ==
Phaius amboinensis is an evergreen, terrestrial herb which forms large clumps. It has three or four fleshy stems, 400–800 mm (20–30 in) long and 15–20 mm (0.6–0.8 in) wide. Each stem has between three and eight dark green, pleated leaves 300–400 mm (10–20 in) long and 7–14 mm (0.3–0.6 in) wide. Between five and twenty resupinate white flowers 40–70 mm (2–3 in) long and 42–75 mm (1.7–3.0 in) wide are borne on a flowering stem 300–900 mm (10–40 in) tall. The dorsal sepal is 30–35 mm (1.2–1.4 in) long, 7–8 mm (0.28–0.31 in) wide and more or less upright. The lateral sepals are a similar length but 8–10 mm (0.3–0.4 in) wide and spread apart from each other. The petals are a similar length to the sepals but narrower. The labellum is yellow, 25–30 mm (0.98–1.2 in) long and 20–25 mm (0.8–1 in) wide with three lobes and wavy edges. There is a complex callus in the centre of the labellum. Flowering occurs from August to November in Australia and over a longer period in Asia.

== Taxonomy and naming ==
Phaius amboinensis was first formally described in 1856 by Carl Ludwig Blume in his book Museum Botanicum Lugduno-Batavum sive stirpium Exoticarum, Novarum vel Minus Cognitarum ex Vivis aut Siccis Brevis Expositio et Descriptio. The specific epithet (amboinensis) is a reference to Ambon Island where the type specimen was collected.

== Distribution and habitat ==
The Arnhem Land swamp orchid in deep shade in wet forests. It occurs in Indonesia, the Philippines, New Guinea, the Northern Territory, New Caledonia, the Solomon Islands, Vanuatu and Samoa.
