= Galeandra bicarinata =

Conservation status
- Endangered (IUCN 3.1)

Scientific classification
- Kingdom: Plantae
- Clade: Tracheophytes
- Clade: Angiosperms
- Clade: Monocots
- Order: Asparagales
- Family: Orchidaceae
- Subfamily: Epidendroideae
- Genus: Galeandra
- Species: G. bicarinata

Binomial name
- Galeandra bicarinata G.A.Romero & P.M.Br.

Species of orchid

Galeandra bicarinata (also known as the hooded orchid, two-keeled galeandra, or helmet orchid) is a species of orchid native to Cuba and Florida. It is closely related to G. beyrichii (widespread throughout much of South America and the Caribbean) and regarded as part of that taxon until described as a distinct species in 2000.
