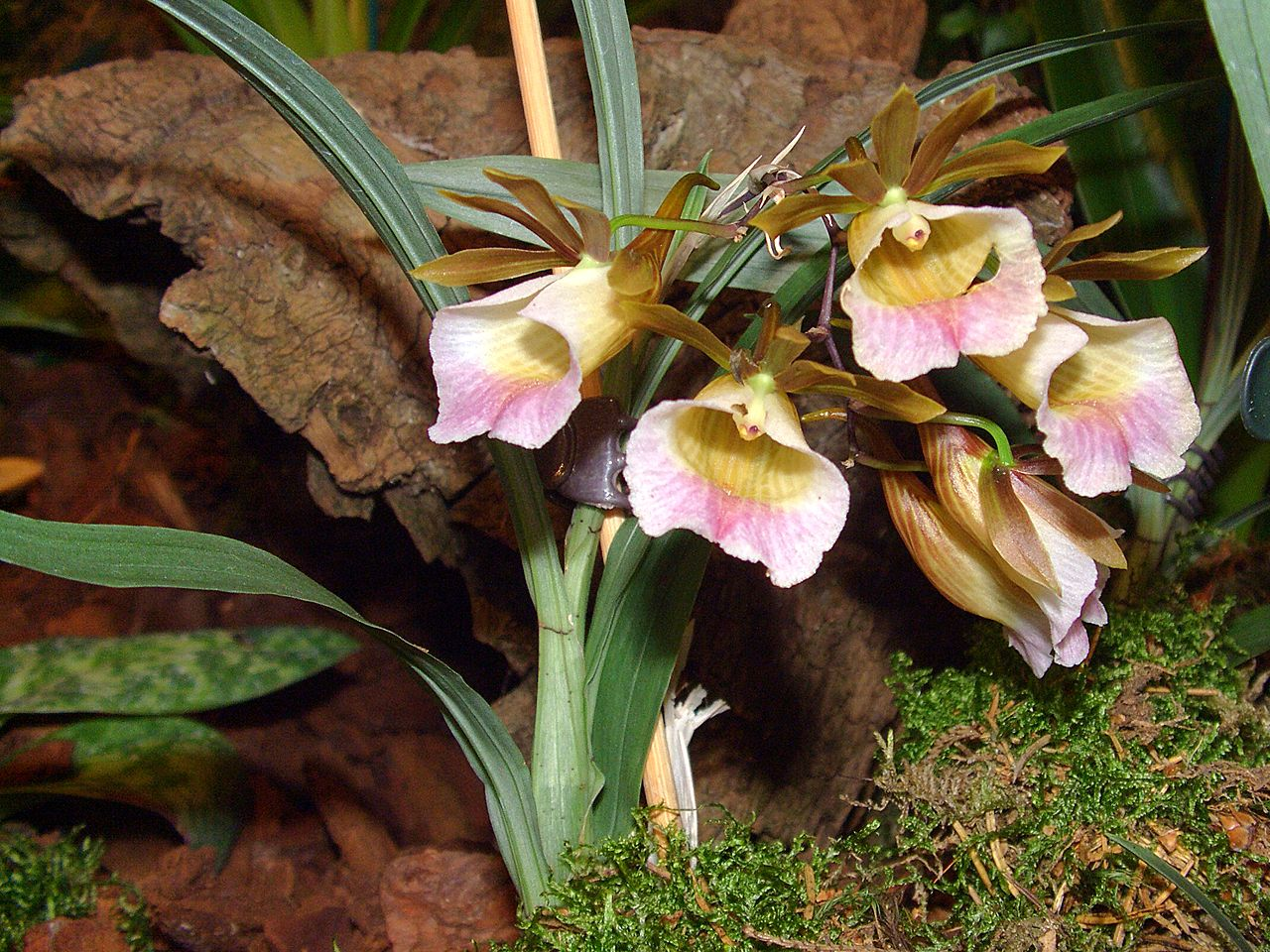

Scientific classification
- Kingdom: Plantae
- Clade: Tracheophytes
- Clade: Angiosperms
- Clade: Monocots
- Order: Asparagales
- Family: Orchidaceae
- Subfamily: Epidendroideae
- Genus: Galeandra
- Species: G. baueri

Binomial name
- Galeandra baueri Lindl.

Synonyms
- Galeandra cristata Lindl.; Galeandra funckii Lindl. ex Rchb.f.; Galeandra funckiana Lindl. ex Rchb.f.

= Galeandra baueri =

Species of orchid

Galeandra baueri is a species of orchid. It is the type species of the genus Galeandra.
