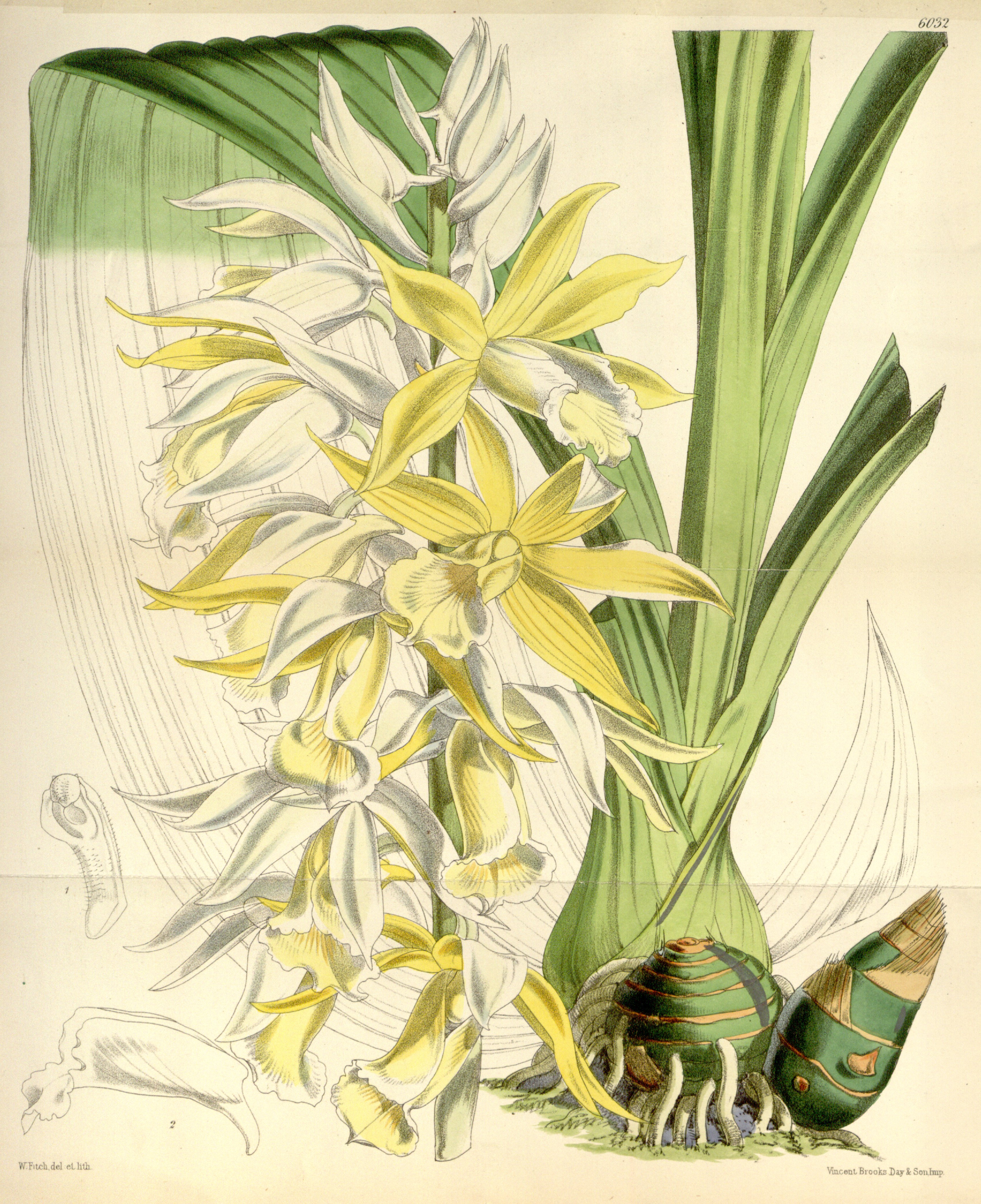

Conservation status
- Endangered (EPBC Act)

Scientific classification
- Kingdom: Plantae
- Clade: Tracheophytes
- Clade: Angiosperms
- Clade: Monocots
- Order: Asparagales
- Family: Orchidaceae
- Subfamily: Epidendroideae
- Genus: Phaius
- Species: P. tankervilleae
- Variety: P. t. var. bernaysii

Trinomial name
- Phaius tankervilleae var. bernaysii (Rowland ex Rchb.f.) J.V.Stone & P.J.Cribb

Synonyms
- List: Phaius australis var. bernaysii (Rowland ex Rchb.f.) Nicholls; Phaius bernaysii Rowland ex Rchb.f.; Phaius blumei var. bernaysii (Rowland ex Rchb.f.) Hook.f.; Phaius grandifolius var. bernaysii (Rowland ex Rchb.f.) F.M.Bailey; Phaius bernaysii f. idae (F.M.Bailey) T.E.Hunt; Phaius bernaysii f. soutteri (F.M.Bailey) T.E.Hunt; Phaius berneysii W.Bull orth. var.; Phaius grandifolius f. idae F.M.Bailey; Phaius grandifolius f. soutteri F.M.Bailey

= Phaius tankervilleae var. bernaysii =

Yellow swamp orchid

Variety of orchid

Phaius tankervilleae var. bernaysii, also known as the yellow swamp orchid, is a species of orchid endemic to a small area of Queensland. It is an evergreen, terrestrial herb with large, crowded pseudobulbs, large pleated leaves and flowers that are white on the outside and sulfur yellow inside. Apart from flower colour, the species is identical to P. tankervilleae var. bernaysii.

== Description ==
Phaius tankervilleae var. bernaysii is an evergreen, terrestrial herb with fleshy, crowded pseudobulbs 50–70 mm (2–3 in) long and wide. There are between four and eight pleated, lance-shaped, dark green leaves 50–125 cm (20–50 in) long and 80–100 mm (3–4 in) wide, with the narrower end towards the base. Between four and sixteen fleshy flowers 60–100 mm (2–4 in) long and 65–110 mm (3–4 in) long are borne on a thick flowering stem 50–200 cm (20–80 in) long. The flowers are the largest of all Australian orchids and are white on the outside, sulfur yellow on the inside. The sepals are 45–55 mm (1.8–2.2 in) long, 12–20 mm (0.5–0.8 in) wide, the dorsal sepal angled upwards and the lateral sepals spread widely apart from each other. The petals are a similar size to the sepals. The labellum is 50–60 mm (2.0–2.4 in) long, 40–45 mm (1.6–1.8 in) wide, has three lobes and ranges in colour from yellow to bright purple. The middle lobe has wavy or crinkly edges and the side lobe sometimes form a tube shape around the column or spread widely apart from each other. Flowering occurs between September and November in Australia.

== Taxonomy and naming ==
The yellow swamp orchid was first formally described in 1873 by Heinrich Gustav Reichenbach and given the name Phaius bernaysii, giving credit to "Dr Rowland" for the discovery. The description was published in The Gardeners' Chronicle. Reichenbach apparently thought that the name was given by Dr Rowland to honour Lewis Adolphus Bernays.

A later edition of The Gardeners' Chronicle included a letter from Lewis Bernays explaining that he himself had collected the specimens and sent them to Ferdinand von Mueller and to his friend "Dr Rowland of Malvern" for him to take to "the eminent firm of Messrs. Veitch & Son", (possibly Veitch Nurseries in London). "Dr Rowland of Malvern" may have been Hugh Mortimer Rowland who had been the first doctor in the village of Carcoar from 1857 to 1867 before returning to England where he died in 1882. The unpublished manuscript had therefore been written by von Mueller, a fact of which Reichenbach was apparently unaware.

In 2017, Judi Stone and Phillip James Cribb published a monograph entitled Lady Tankerville's Legacy - A Historical and Monographic Review of Phaius and Gastrorchis and reduced Phaius bernaysii to a variety of Phaius tankervilleae.

== Distribution and habitat ==
Phaius tankervilleae var. bernaysii is found in near-coastal swampy forest. It occurs on Stradbroke Island but has been seen in the past on Peel Island, Bribie Island and at Noosa Heads.

== Conservation status ==
The yellow swamp orchid, as Phaius bernaysii, is listed as "endangered" under the Australian Government Environment Protection and Biodiversity Conservation Act 1999 and the Queensland Government Nature Conservation Act 1992. The main threats to the species are illegal collection of the plants and flowers, inappropriate fire regimes and changes in swamp hydrology due to human activities.
