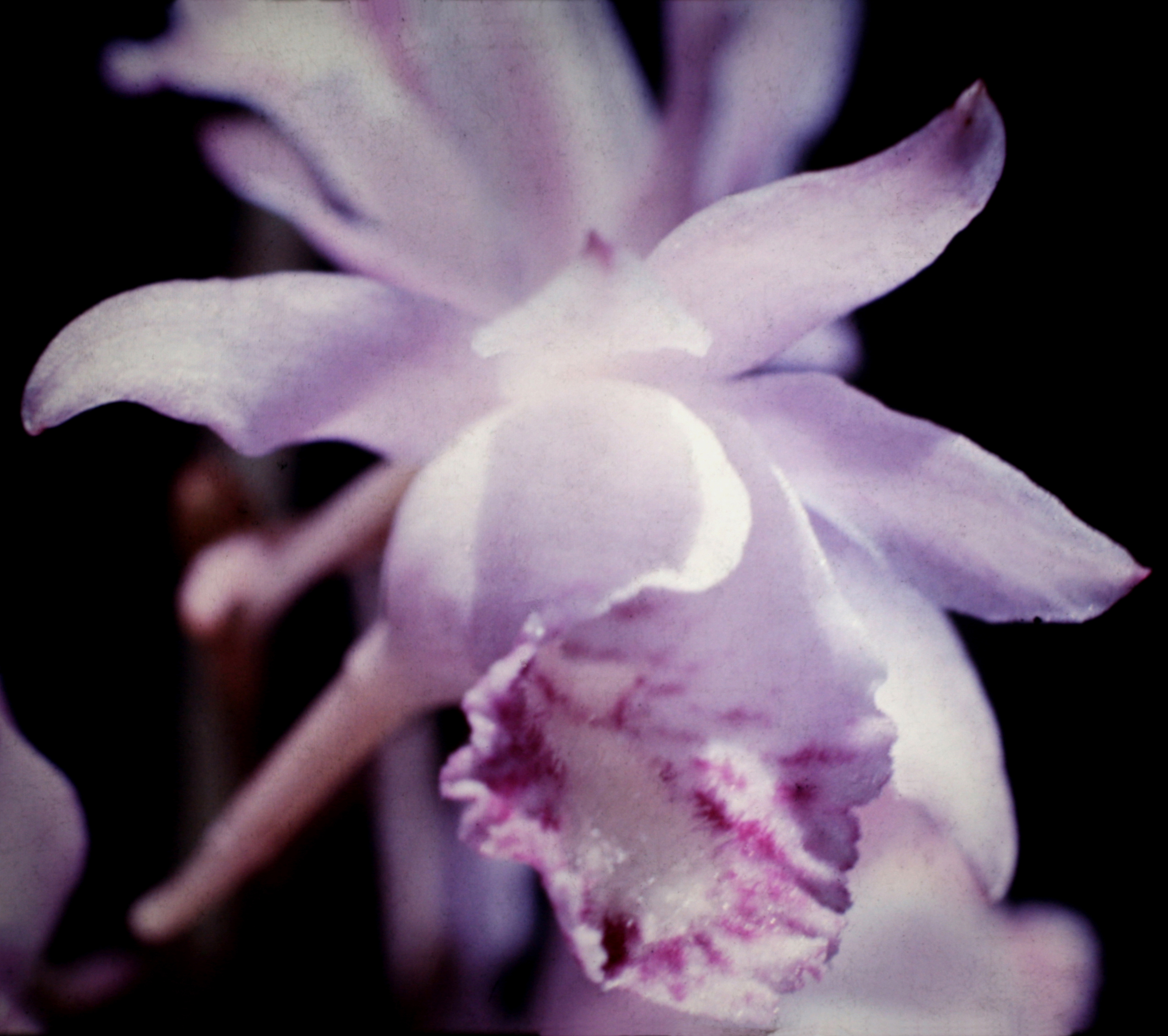
- Galeandra styllomisantha

Scientific classification
- Kingdom: Plantae
- Clade: Tracheophytes
- Clade: Angiosperms
- Clade: Monocots
- Order: Asparagales
- Family: Orchidaceae
- Subfamily: Epidendroideae
- Tribe: Cymbidieae
- Subtribe: Catasetinae
- Genus: Galeandra; Lindl.

Type species
- Galeandra baueri Lindl.

Synonyms
- Corydandra Rchb.; Tupacamaria Archila

= Galeandra =

Genus of orchids

Galeandra, abbreviated as Gal in horticultural trade, is a genus of about 40 species of orchids native to South America, Central America, the West Indies and Florida.

== Species ==
As of December 2025, Plants of the World Online accepts the following 41 species:

- Galeandra arundinis Garay & G.A.Romero
- Galeandra badia Garay & G.A.Romero
- Galeandra batemanii Rolfe
- Galeandra baueri Lindl.
- Galeandra beyrichii Rchb.f.
- Galeandra bicarinata G.A.Romero & P.M.Br.
- Galeandra biloba Garay
- Galeandra blanchetii E.S.Rand
- Galeandra blattiodora G.A.Romero & C.Gómez
- Galeandra camptoceras Schltr.
- Galeandra carnevaliana G.A.Romero & Warford
- Galeandra claesii Cogn.
- Galeandra curvifolia Barb.Rodr.
- Galeandra devoniana R.H.Schomb. ex Lindl.
- Galeandra dives Rchb.f. & Warsz.
- Galeandra duidensis Garay & G.A.Romero
- Galeandra graminoides Barb.Rodr.
- Galeandra greenwoodiana Warford
- Galeandra harveyana Rchb.f.
- Galeandra huebneri Schltr.
- Galeandra hysterantha Barb.Rodr.
- Galeandra junceaoides Barb.Rodr.
- Galeandra lacustris Barb.Rodr.
- Galeandra lagoensis Rchb.f. & Warm.
- Galeandra leptoceras Schltr.
- Galeandra levyae Garay
- Galeandra macroplectra G.A.Romero & Warford
- Galeandra magnicolumna G.A.Romero & Warford
- Galeandra minax Rchb.f.
- Galeandra montana Barb.Rodr.
- Galeandra multifoliata Walth.Zimm.
- Galeandra nivalis Mast.
- Galeandra paraguayensis Cogn.
- Galeandra pilosocolumna (C.Schweinf.) D.E.Benn. & Christenson
- Galeandra santarena S.H.N.Monteiro & J.B.F.Silva
- Galeandra schmidtii V.P.Castro
- Galeandra schunkii V.P.Castro & Chiron
- Galeandra sobralioides Archila & Chiron
- Galeandra stangeana Rchb.f.
- Galeandra styllomisantha (Vell.) Hoehne
- Galeandra xerophila Hoehne
