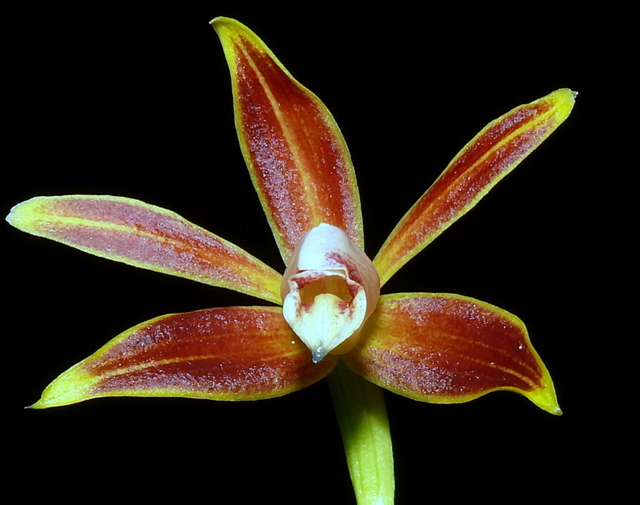

Scientific classification
- Kingdom: Plantae
- Clade: Tracheophytes
- Clade: Angiosperms
- Clade: Monocots
- Order: Asparagales
- Family: Orchidaceae
- Subfamily: Epidendroideae
- Genus: Phaius
- Species: P. borneensis

Binomial name
- Phaius borneensis J.J.Sm.

= Phaius borneensis =

Species of orchid

Phaius borneensis is a species of orchid in the genus Phaius. It is native to the Islands of Borneo, Palawan and Mindoro.
