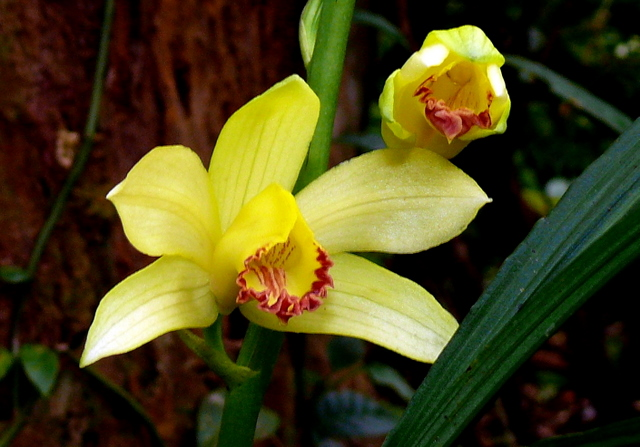

Scientific classification
- Kingdom: Plantae
- Clade: Tracheophytes
- Clade: Angiosperms
- Clade: Monocots
- Order: Asparagales
- Family: Orchidaceae
- Subfamily: Epidendroideae
- Genus: Phaius
- Species: P. flavus

Binomial name
- Phaius flavus Lindl.

Synonyms
- Limodorum flavum Blume; Bletia flava (Blume) Wall. ex Lindl.; Bletia woodfordii Hook.; Phaius maculatus Lindl.; Hecabe lutea Raf.; Limodorum crispum Reinw. ex Blume; Phaius crispus Blume; Phaius flexuosus Blume; Phaius minor Blume; Phaius platychilus Rchb.f.; Phaius bracteosus Rchb.f.; Phaius celebicus Schltr.; Phaius linearifolius Ames; Phaius undulatomarginatus Hayata; Phaius somae Hayata; Phaius woodfordii (Hook.) Merr.; Phaius minor f. punctatus Ohwi; Phaius tankervilleae f. veronicae S.Y.Hu & Barretto; Phaius flavus f. punctatus (Ohwi) K.Nakaj.

= Phaius flavus =

Species of orchid

Phaius flavus is a species of orchid in the genus Phaius described by John Lindley in 1831. It is widespread across much of Asia (China, Japan, India, Thailand, Indonesia, the Philippines, etc.) as well as New Guinea, New Caledonia, Samoa and Vanuatu.

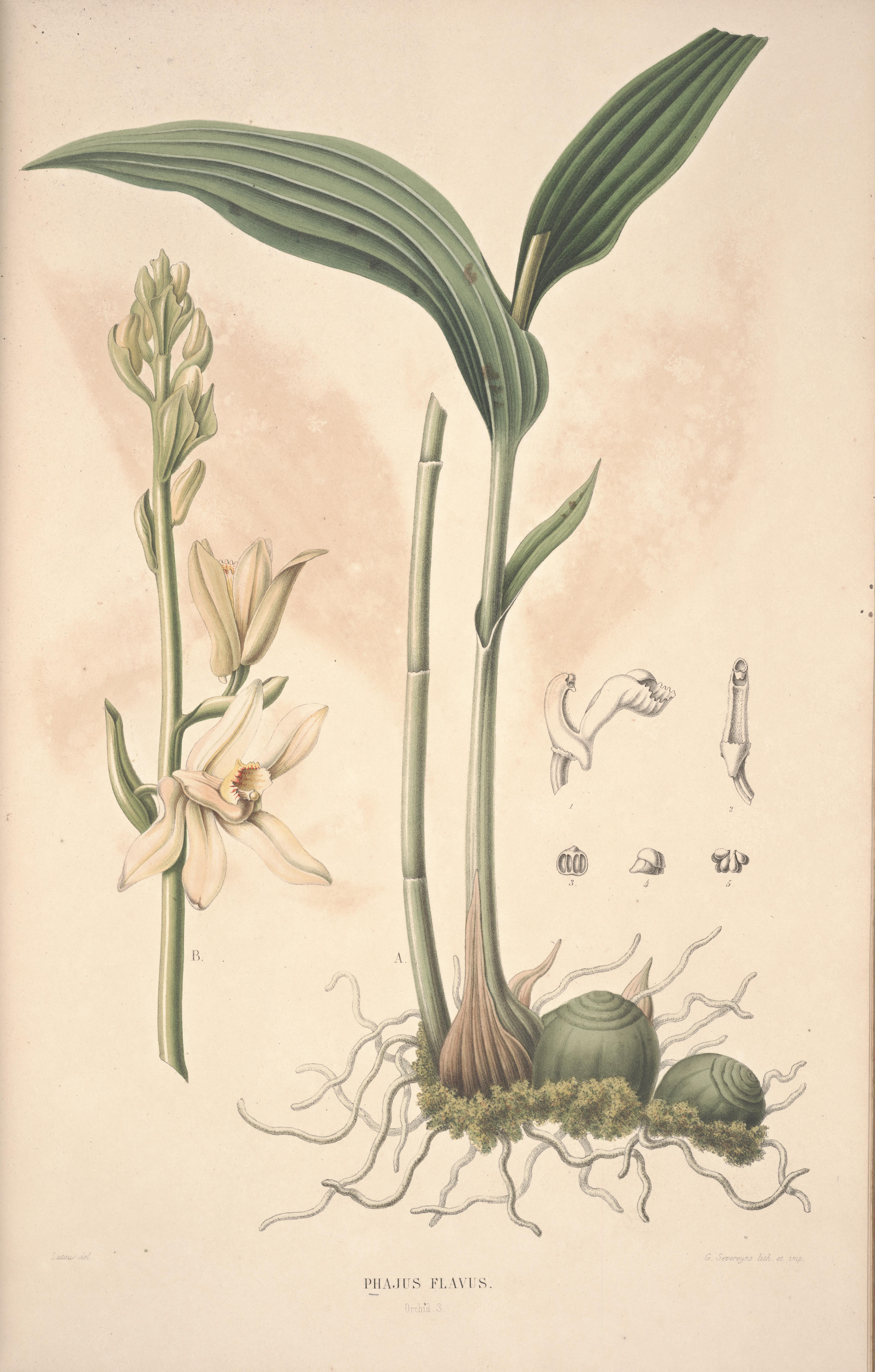
Illustration.
