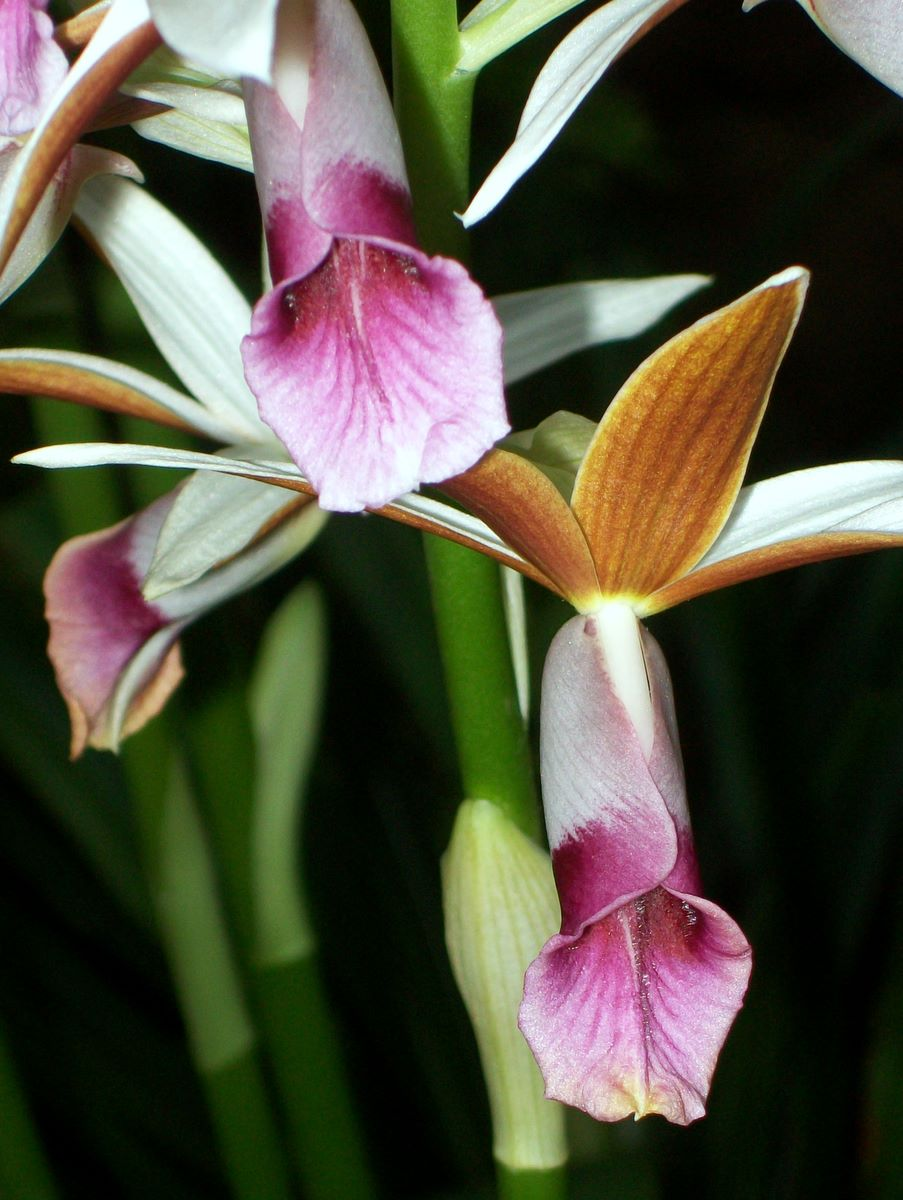
- In the Royal Botanic Gardens, Sydney

Conservation status
- Endangered (EPBC Act)

Scientific classification
- Kingdom: Plantae
- Clade: Tracheophytes
- Clade: Angiosperms
- Clade: Monocots
- Order: Asparagales
- Family: Orchidaceae
- Subfamily: Epidendroideae
- Genus: Phaius
- Species: P. tankervilleae
- Variety: P. t. var. australis

Trinomial name
- Phaius tankervilleae var. australis (F.Muell.) J.V.Stone & P.J.Cribb

Synonyms
- Phaius australis F.Muell.; Phaius grandifolius var. rowanae F.M.Bailey

= Phaius tankervilleae var. australis =

Southern swamp orchid

Variety of orchid

Phaius tankervilleae var. australis, also known as common swamp orchid, southern swamp-orchid, swamp lily or island swamp-orchid, is a species of orchid endemic to eastern Australia. It is an evergreen, terrestrial herb with large, crowded pseudobulbs, large pleated leaves and flowers that are reddish brown on the inside and white outside.

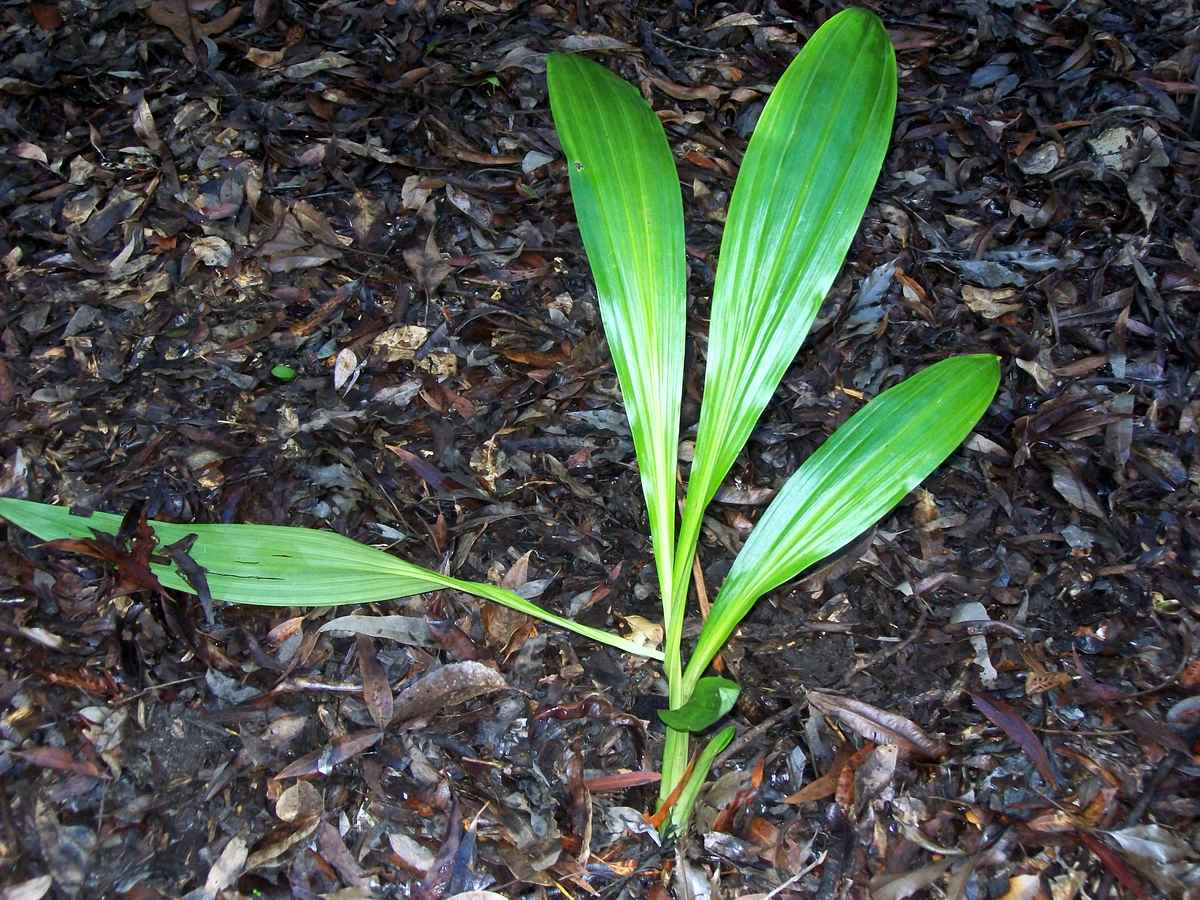
Leaves on a plant in Coffs Harbour

== Description ==
Phaius tankervilleae var. australis is an evergreen, terrestrial herb with fleshy, crowded pseudobulbs 50–70 mm (2–3 in) long and wide. There are between four and eight pleated, lance-shaped, dark green leaves 50–125 cm (20–50 in) long and 80–100 mm (3–4 in) wide, with the narrower end towards the base. Between four and sixteen fleshy flowers 60–100 mm (2–4 in) long and 65–110 mm (3–4 in) long are borne on a thick flowering stem 50–200 cm (20–80 in) long. The flowers are the largest of all Australian orchids and are reddish brown on the inside, white on the outside. The sepals are 45–55 mm (1.8–2.2 in) long, 12–20 mm (0.5–0.8 in) wide, the dorsal sepal angled upwards and the lateral sepals spread widely apart from each other. The petals are a similar size to the sepals. The labellum is 50–60 mm (2.0–2.4 in) long, 40–45 mm (1.6–1.8 in) wide, has three lobes and ranges in colour from yellow to bright purple. The middle lobe has wavy or crinkly edges and the side lobe sometimes form a tube shape around the column or spread widely apart from each other. Flowering occurs between September and November in Australia.

== Taxonomy and naming ==
The common swamp orchid was first formally described in 1858 by Ferdinand von Mueller who gave it the name Phaius australis and published the description in Fragmenta phytographiae Australiae. In 2017, Judi Stone and Phillip James Cribb published a monograph entitled Lady Tankerville's Legacy - A Historical and Monographic Review of Phaius and Gastrorchis and reduced Phaius australis to a variety of Phaius tankervilleae.

== Distribution and habitat ==
Phaius tankervilleae var. australis is found in near-coastal swampy forest between Cooktown in Queensland and Lake Cathie in New South Wales. It sometimes forms large colonies especially in Melaleuca quinquenervia swamps and in wet forests.

== Conservation ==
Common swamp orchid, as Phaius australia, is listed as "endangered" under the Australian Government Environment Protection and Biodiversity Conservation Act 1999 and the New South Wales Government Biodiversity Conservation Act 2016. The main threats to the species are illegal collection of the plants and flowers, habitat loss and invasion by weeds such as lantana and umbrella tree (Heptapleurum actinophyllum).

== Use in horticulture ==
An easily grown plant in cultivation, it prefers semi shade. Propagation is achieved from seed or by the cutting of the base clump of the plant. The decorative and scented flowers occur between late August and October. Coloured reddish brown with yellow. Another method of regeneration is flower stem node propagation. Where, after flowering, the scape is either laid whole or in sections on a medium such as sphagnum moss or stood in a container of water. Plantlets emerge from the nodes, and when large enough, are removed and potted up. The large flowers occur in spring.
