= Australian Plant Census =

Plant database website

The Australian Plant Census (APC) provides an online interface to currently accepted, published, scientific names of the vascular flora of Australia, as one of the output interfaces of the national government Integrated Biodiversity Information System (IBIS – an Oracle Co. relational database management system). The Australian National Herbarium, Australian National Botanic Gardens, Australian Biological Resources Study and the Council of Heads of Australasian Herbaria coordinate the system.

The Australian Plant Census interface provides the currently accepted scientific names, their synonyms, illegitimate, misapplied and excluded names, as well as state distribution data. Each item of output hyperlinks to other online interfaces of the information system, including the Australian Plant Name Index (APNI) and the Australian Plant Image Index (APII). The outputs of the Australian Plant Census interface provide information on all native and naturalised vascular plant taxa of Australia, including its offshore islands, but excludes taxa only known in Australia from their cultivation and not (yet) naturalised.

The classification of plant families is based on the Angiosperm Phylogeny Group III system (2009).
