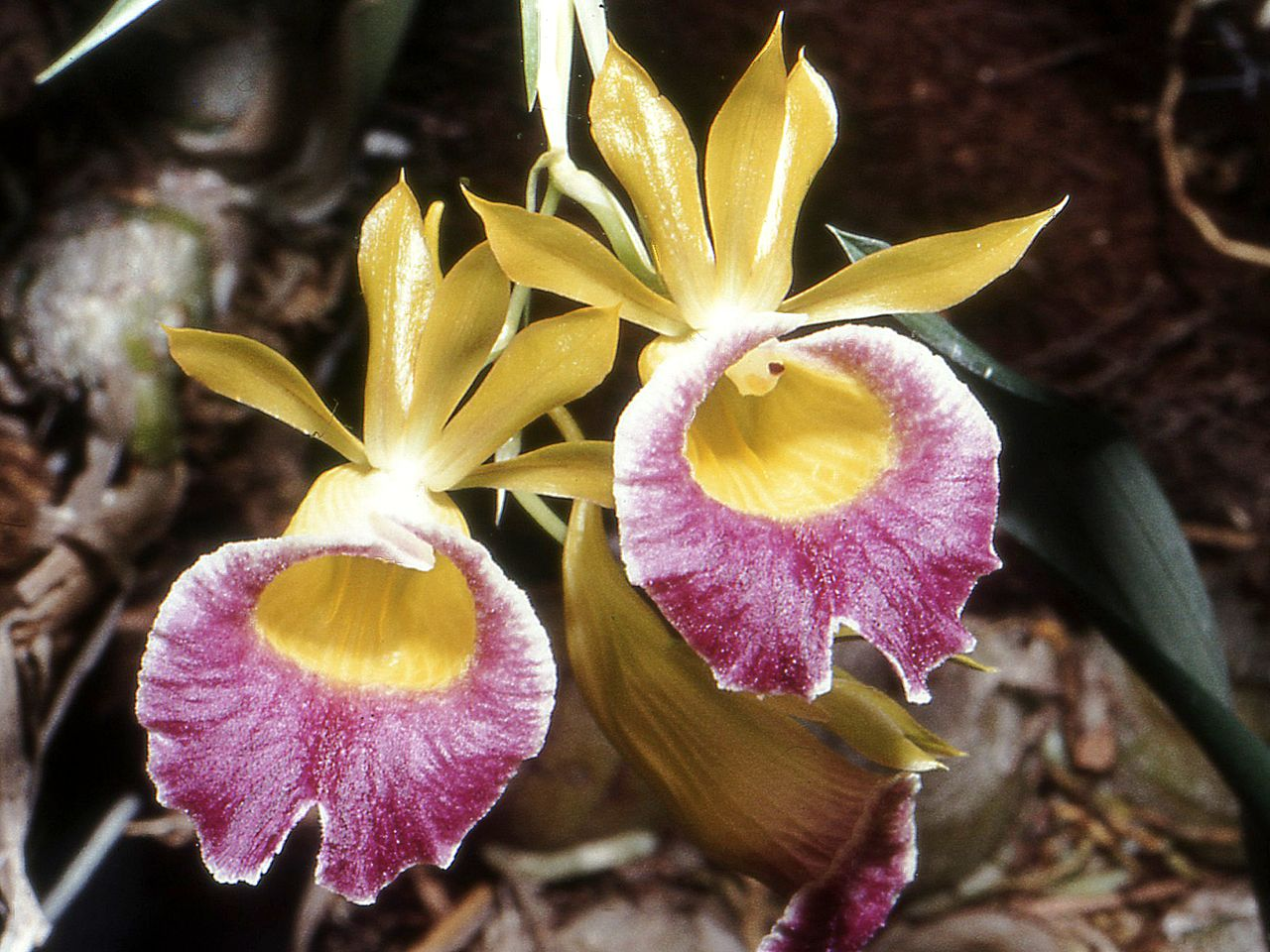

Scientific classification
- Kingdom: Plantae
- Clade: Tracheophytes
- Clade: Angiosperms
- Clade: Monocots
- Order: Asparagales
- Family: Orchidaceae
- Subfamily: Epidendroideae
- Genus: Galeandra
- Species: G. batemanii

Binomial name
- Galeandra batemanii Rolfe

= Galeandra batemanii =

Species of orchid

Galeandra batemanii is a species of orchid native to Oaxaca, Belize and Central America.
