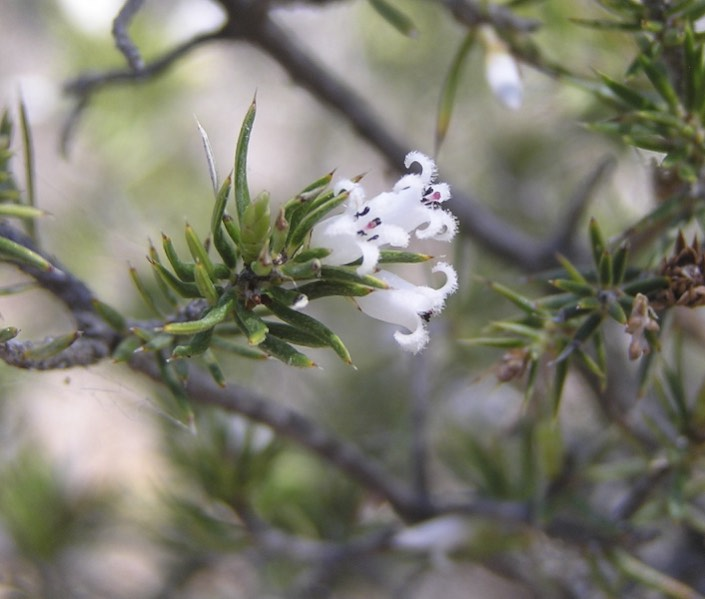

Scientific classification
- Kingdom: Plantae
- Clade: Tracheophytes
- Clade: Angiosperms
- Clade: Eudicots
- Clade: Asterids
- Order: Ericales
- Family: Ericaceae
- Genus: Styphelia
- Species: S. mitchellii

Binomial name
- Styphelia mitchellii (Benth.) F.Muell.
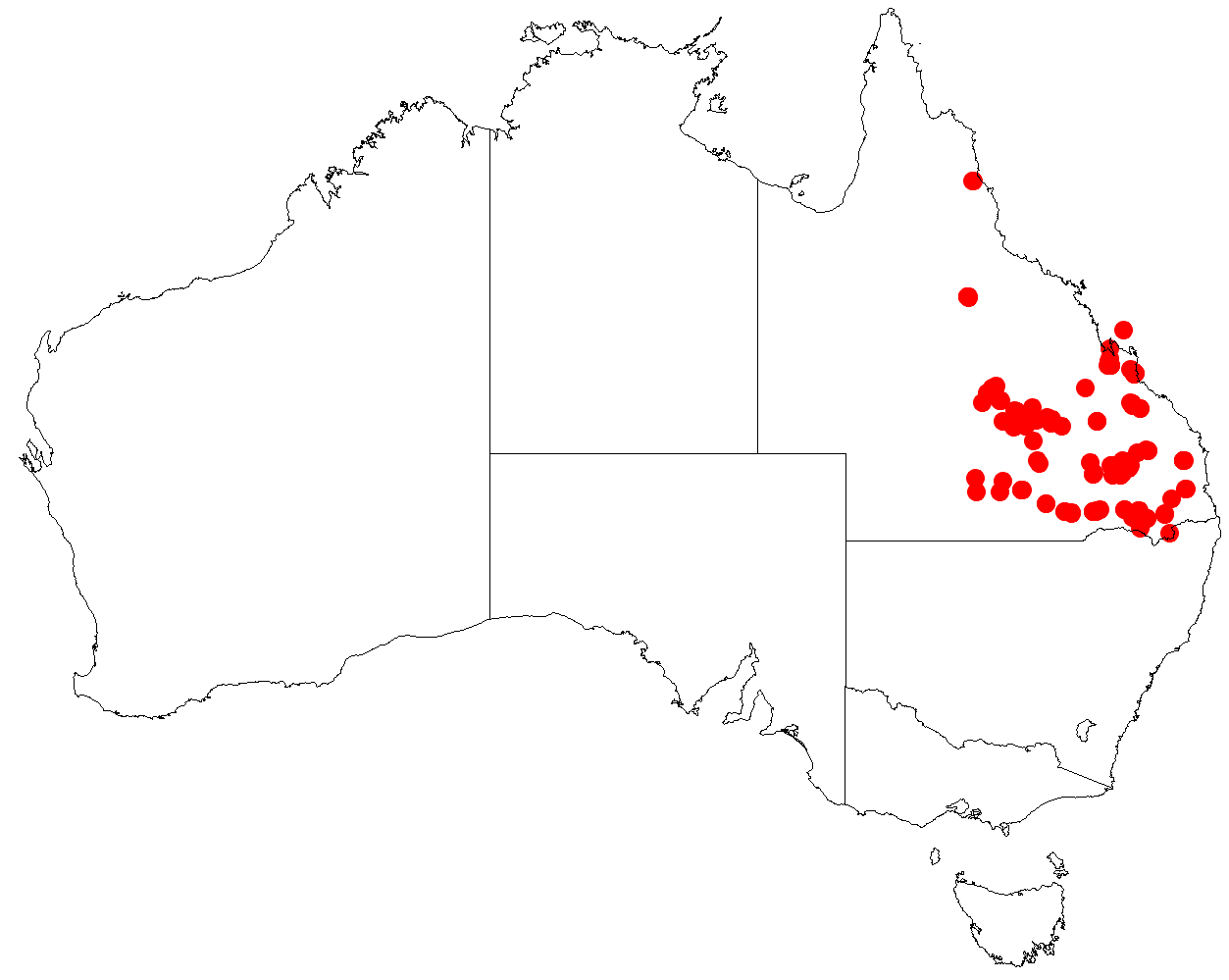
- Occurrence data from AVH

Synonyms
- Leucopogon mitchellii Benth.; Leucopogon cuspidatus Lindl.

= Styphelia mitchellii =

Species of flowering plant

Styphelia mitchellii is a species of flowering plant in the family Ericaceae family and is endemic to Queensland. It is a shrub with sharply-pointed, narrowly oblong leaves and white, tube-shaped flowers.

== Description ==
Styphelia mitchellii is a glabrous, often glaucous shrub that typically grows to a height of 60–90 cm (24–35 in). Its leaves are sessile, narrowly oblong, usually less than 12 mm (0.47 in) long, with a small, sharp point on the tip. The flowers are usually borne singly in leaf axils on a short peduncle, the flowers relatively large for the genus Leucopogon. There are minute bracts at the base of the flower and broad bracteoles less than half as long as the sepals. The sepals are almost 4.2 mm (0.17 in) long, and the petals are white, joined at the base to form a tube 6.3–7.4 mm (0.25–0.29 in) long with lobes almost 4.2 mm (0.17 in) long. The style protrudes beyond the petal tube.

== Taxonomy ==
This species was first formally described in 1868 by George Bentham, who gave it the name Leucopogon mitchellii in Flora Australiensis from specimens collected, among others, by Thomas Mitchell near Lake Salvator Rosa. In 1882, Ferdinand von Mueller transferred the species to Styphelia as S. mitchellii in his Systematic Census of Australian Plants.

== Distribution ==
This species is endemic to Queensland.

== Conservation status ==
Styphelia mitchellii is listed as of "least concern" by the Queensland Government Department of Environment and Science.
