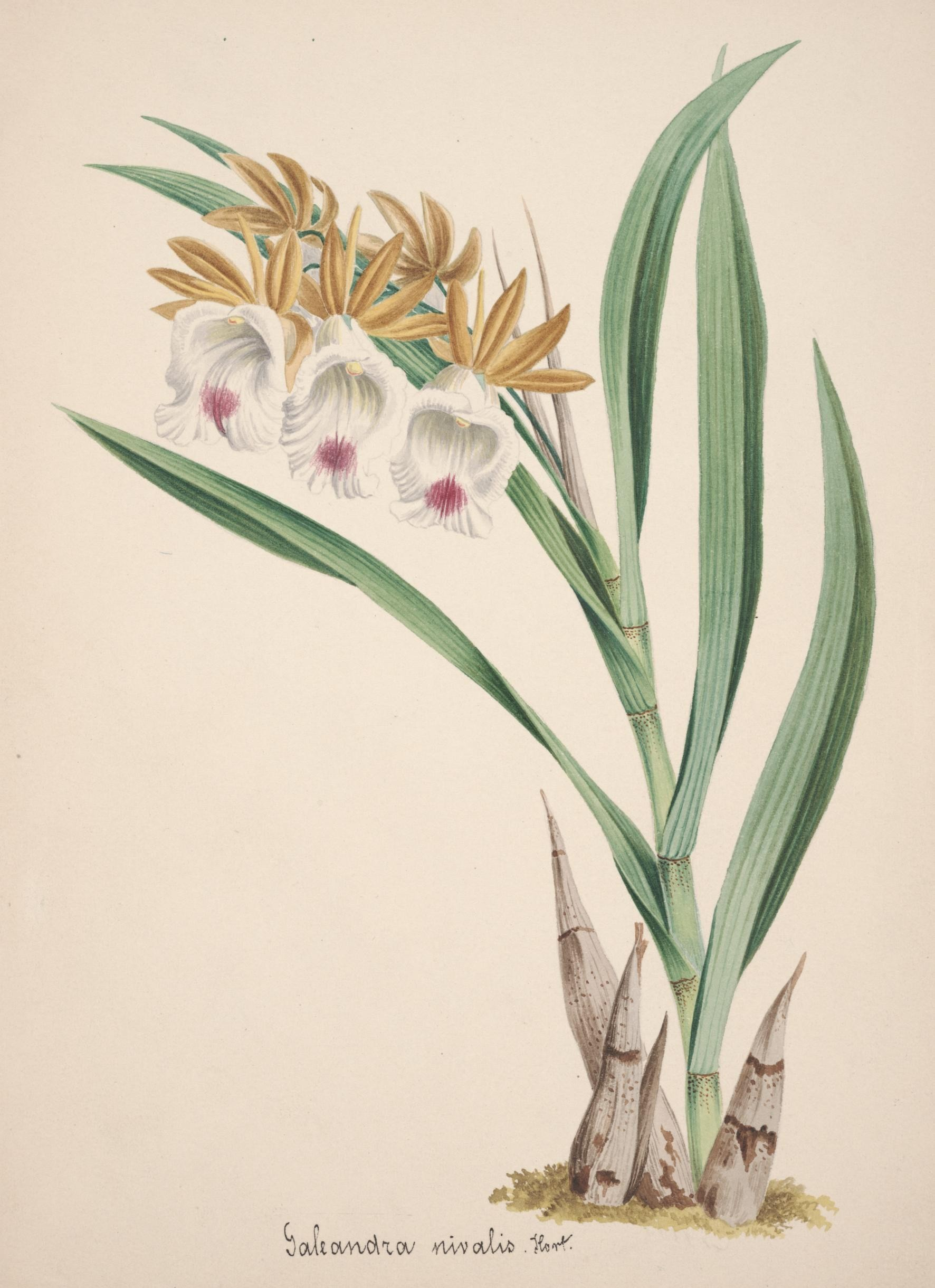

Scientific classification
- Kingdom: Plantae
- Clade: Tracheophytes
- Clade: Angiosperms
- Clade: Monocots
- Order: Asparagales
- Family: Orchidaceae
- Subfamily: Epidendroideae
- Genus: Galeandra
- Species: G. nivalis

Binomial name
- Galeandra nivalis Mast.

= Galeandra nivalis =

Species of orchid

Galeandra nivalis is a species of orchid endemic to northern Brazil.
