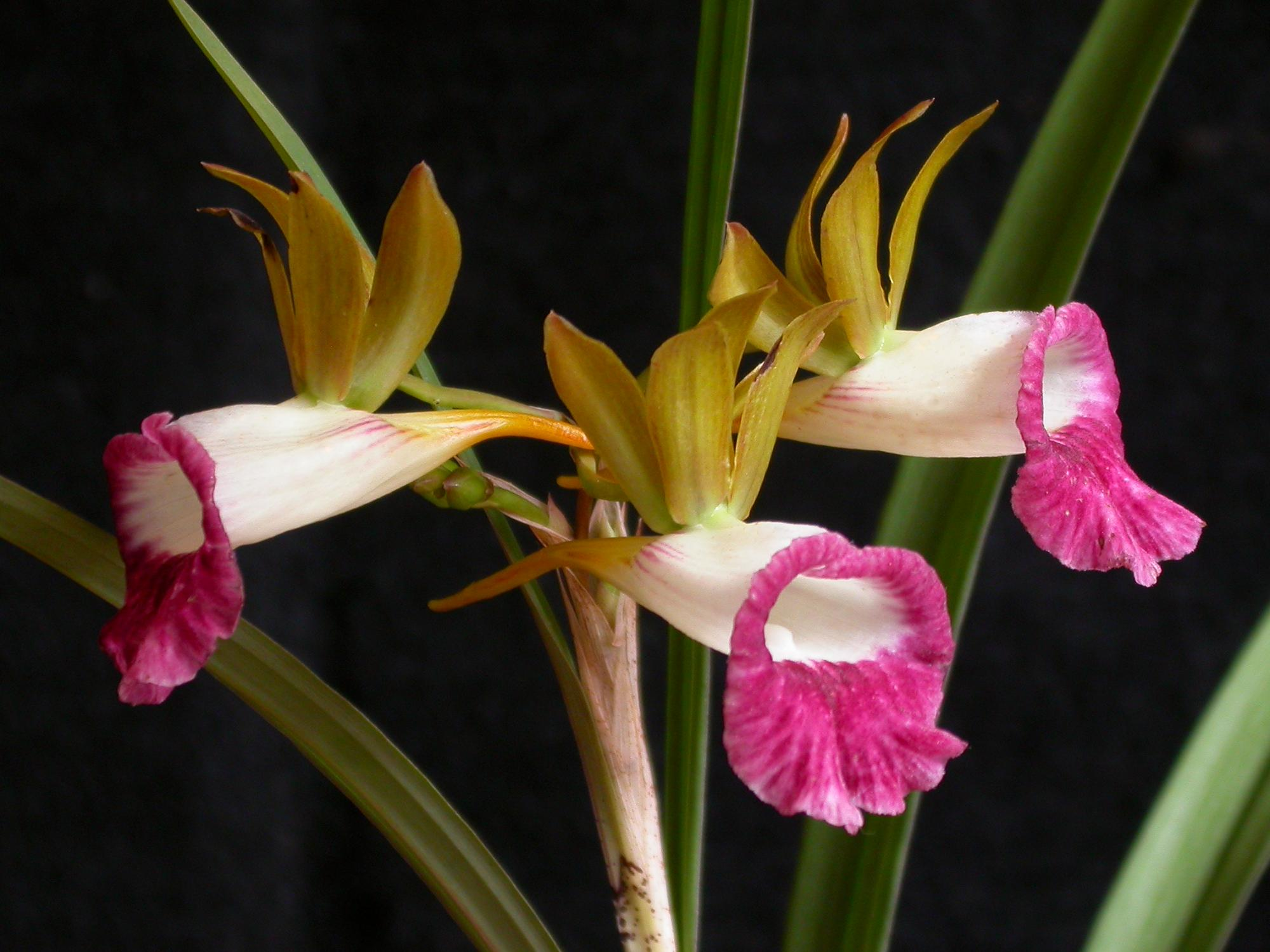

Scientific classification
- Kingdom: Plantae
- Clade: Tracheophytes
- Clade: Angiosperms
- Clade: Monocots
- Order: Asparagales
- Family: Orchidaceae
- Subfamily: Epidendroideae
- Genus: Galeandra
- Species: G. minax

Binomial name
- Galeandra minax Rchb.f.

= Galeandra minax =

Species of orchid

Galeandra minax is a species of orchid native to Brazil and Venezuela.
