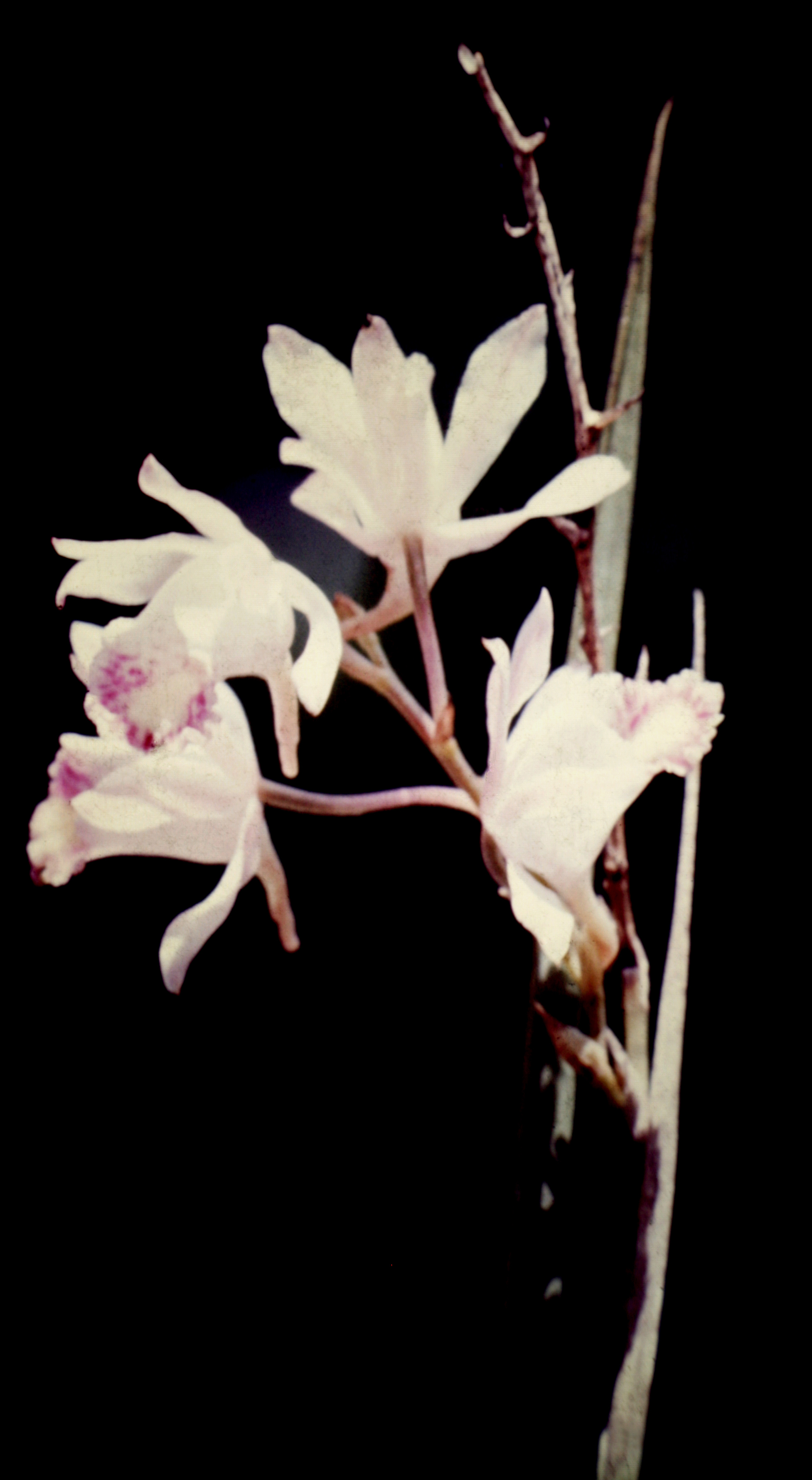

Scientific classification
- Kingdom: Plantae
- Clade: Tracheophytes
- Clade: Angiosperms
- Clade: Monocots
- Order: Asparagales
- Family: Orchidaceae
- Subfamily: Epidendroideae
- Genus: Galeandra
- Species: G. styllomisantha

Binomial name
- Galeandra styllomisantha (Vell.) Hoehne

Synonyms
- Orchis styllomisantha Vell. (basionym); Galeandra juncea Lindl.; Phaius rosellus Lem.

= Galeandra styllomisantha =

Species of orchid

Galeandra styllomisantha is a species of orchid. It is widespread across much of South America from Guyana to Argentina.
