= Council of Heads of Australasian Herbaria =

Association of herbaria leaders in Australia and New Zealand

- Available in: English
- Website: chah.gov.au
- Commercial: No
- Registration: ABN 31 496 409 479
- Current status: Active

Council of Heads of Australasian Herbaria (CHAH) is an association of the leaders of herbaria in Australia and New Zealand. It is governed by a constitution. It endorses the taxonomy and nomenclature of the Australian Plant Census, which is the source for accepted names of species and, in particular, for accepted names of Australasian species. It supports the Australian Plant Name Index. CHAH is incorporated in the A.C.T. and is an Australian registered business with ABN 31 496 409 479.

Membership of CHAH consists of the heads of the following herbaria:

- State Herbarium of South Australia, Adelaide
- Queensland Herbarium, Brisbane
- Australian National Herbarium, Canberra
- Australian Tropical Herbarium, Cairns
- Tasmanian Herbarium, Hobart
- National Herbarium of Victoria, Melbourne
- National Herbarium of New South Wales, Sydney
- Northern Territory Herbarium, Darwin
- Western Australian Herbarium, Perth
- Allan Herbarium, Christchurch, NZ
- Te Papa Herbaria, Wellington, NZ
- Auckland Museum Herbarium

There are a further two council members: one to represent the constituent collections of the National Collection of Fungi;
and another to represent Australian university herbaria.

The council also invites observers to participate. As of 14 September 2018 there are observers from:

- Papua New Guinea National Herbarium (LAE)
- Council of Heads of Australian Fauna Collections (CHAFC)
- Council of Australian Museum Directors (CAMD)
- Australian Biological Resources Study (ABRS)
- Council of Heads of Australian Botanic Gardens (CHABG)
