= Australian Biological Resources Study =

Project by the Australian government

Australian Biological Resources Study (ABRS) is a project undertaken by the Parks Australia Division of Australia's Department of Climate Change, Energy, the Environment and Water.

== Background ==
ABRS was founded in 1973 from the recommendations of a 1972 Senate Select Committee report on Wildlife Conservation. ABRS was first set up as an Interim Council in 1973, followed by the establishment of the Study proper in 1978. The main aim of the Interim Council was to stimulate the study of taxonomy, distribution and ecology of Australia's biological resources via research grants, and for assessing the long term national requirements for taxonomic studies and maintenance of national collections of biological specimens.

== Research grants ==
A core aim of the ABRS is to provide funding to support research on taxonomy and systematics for Australia's biota.

The first grants offered by ABRS were to support the collection and scientific description of Australian plants and animals. Up to $750,000 was made available across three financial years: 1973–74, 1974–75 and 1975–76, with the scheme topped up with $250,000 for each of 1976–77 and 1977–78. In total, 89 projects were funded during the five year period.

== Publications ==
The most important outputs of the ABRS has been the publication of the multi-volume Flora of Australia and Fauna of Australia series.

Other output includes The Banksia Atlas and the "Platypus" database package for taxonomists.

Sponsored publications from grants, or publishing projects include:

Adams, Laurence G; Thiele, K. R; Australian Biological Resources Study (2001), Families of flowering plants of Australia: an interactive identification guide (Rev. ed.), CSIRO Publishing, ISBN 978-0-643-06721-9

Cribb, Thomas Herbert; Bray, R. A; Wright, T. (Trudy) (1996), Trematodes of Australian fishes: an analysis of the diversity of trematodes of Australian fishes prepared in conjunction with a final report for the ABRS grant of the same name, Dept. of Parasitology, The University of Queensland

Huisman, John Marinus; Australian Biological Resources Study (2000), Marine plants of Australia, University of Western Australia Press in association with Australian Biological Resources Study, ISBN 978-1-876268-33-6
