= André Schuiteman =

Dutch botanist (born 1960)

André Schuiteman (born 1960, Amsterdam) is a Dutch botanist in the Royal Botanic Gardens, Kew in London, United Kingdom, where he is the Research Leader for Asia in Plant Identification and Naming. Schuitemania, a genus of orchid, was named in his honour.

== Publications ==
andré Schuiteman. 2014. Dendrobieae (p.p.) and Aeridinae (p.p.) En: Pridgeon, A.M., Cribb, V, Chase, M.W. & Rasmussen, F.N. (Eds.). Genera Orchidacearum. Vol. 6. Epidendroideae (Parte 3) Oxford Univ. Press

- leonid Averyanov, Romana Rybková. 2013. Vanilla atropogon, a new species from Vietnam. Orchideen. 1-1; 10–16
- jaap jan Vermeulen, ed de Vogel, art Vogel. 2011. Nocturne for an unknown pollinator: first description of a night-flowering orchid (Bulbophyllum nocturnum). Botanical Journal of the Linnean Society 167 ( 3): 344–350 doi 10.1111/j.1095-8339.2011.01183.x 2011. The strange case of Dendrobium aphyllum. Orchid Review 119: 104–110
- p. Bonnet, b. Svengsuksa, d. Barthélémy. 2008. An annotated checklist of the Orchidaceae of Laos. Nordic Journal of Botany 26: 257–314
- barbara Gravendeel, ann Smithson, ferry j.w. Slik, andre Schuiteman. 2004. Epiphytism and pollinator specialization: drivers for orchid diversity? Phil. Trans. R. Soc. Lond. B 359, 1523–1535
