= Noosa Heads bus station =

Bus station in Noosa Heads, Queensland

Noosa Heads
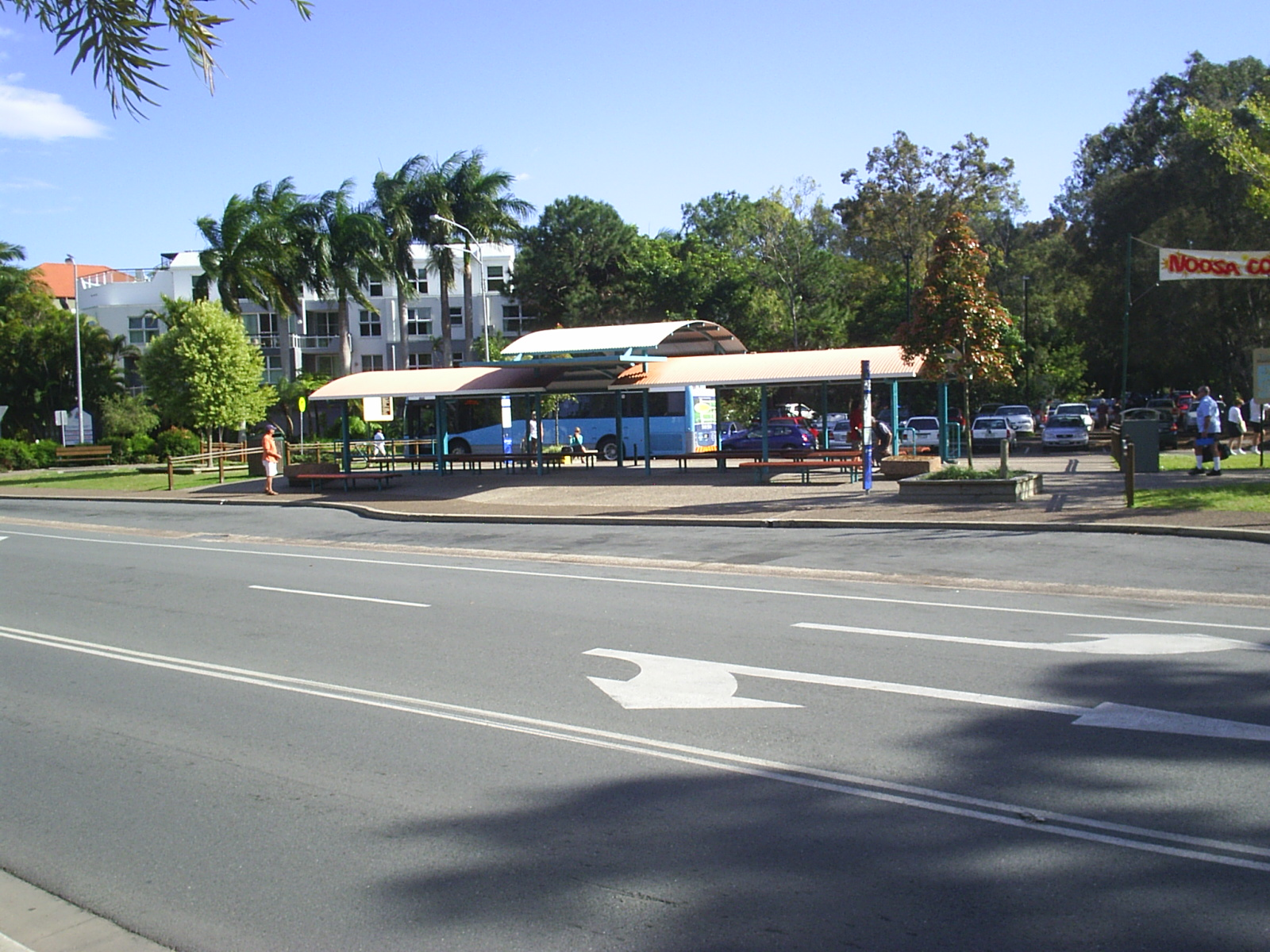
- Noosa Heads bus station in August 2006

General information
- Location: Cnr Noosa Parade & Noosa Drive, Noosa Heads
- Coordinates: 26°23′17.6″S 153°05′27.9″E
- Operator: Translink
- Platforms: 2
- Bus routes: 6
- Bus stands: 2

Construction
- Accessible: Yes

Other information
- Fare zone: 8
- Website: Translink
Location

Noosa Heads is a bus station operated by Translink. It serves the Noosa suburb of Noosa Heads. It is a ground-level station, featuring one island platform with two faces.

It is serviced by Kinetic Sunshine Coast bus routes to Sunshine Plaza, Nambour station, Sunrise Beach, Sunshine Beach and Tewantin. It is near Hastings Street, Noosa Heads and is close to the Noosa Heads National Park.

Until August 2011, it was also served by long-distance services operated by Greyhound Australia and Premier Motor Service. However, these now call at Noosa Junction bus station.

== Bus routes ==
The following bus routes services Noosa Heads Bus Station:

Platform	Route number	Destination	Locations/roads serving
1	620	Some services to Tewantin	Gympie Terrace
1	626	Tewantin	Former Noosa TAFE site
1	627	Tewantin	Gympie Terrace
1	629	Tewantin	Noosa Civic, Noosaville
1	630	Nambour	Eumundi
1	631	Nambour	Tewantin, Cooroy, Eumundi, Yandina
2	620	Sunshine Plaza	Noosa Junction, Peregian Beach, Coolum Beach, Marcoola
2	626	Sunrise Beach	Noosa Junction, Solway Drive
2	627	Sunshine Beach	Noosa Junction, Ben Lexcen Drive
2	629	Noosa Junction	Noosa Drive
2	630	Noosa Junction	Noosa Drive
2	631	Noosa Junction	Noosa Drive
