= Noosa Junction bus station =

Bus station in Queensland, Australia

Noosa Junction

General information
- Location: Cnr Sunshine Beach Road & Cooyar Street, Noosa Junction
- Coordinates: 26°48′21.08″S 153°07′58.38″E
- Operator: Translink
- Platforms: 2
- Bus routes: 9
- Bus stands: 3

Construction
- Accessible: Yes

Other information
- Fare zone: 8
- Website: Translink

History
- Opened: August 2011; 15 years ago
Location

Noosa Junction is a bus station operated by Translink. It opened in 2011 and serves the Noosa suburb of Noosa Heads. It is a ground level station, featuring two side platforms with three bus stands.

== History ==
It is serviced by Kinetic Sunshine Coast bus routes to Sunshine Plaza, Nambour station, Sunrise Beach, Sunshine Beach and Tewantin.

It is also served by long-distance services to services to Agnes Water, Brisbane, Cairns, and Hervey Bay provided by Greyhound Australia and Premier Motor Service.

== Bus routes ==
The following bus routes service Noosa Junction bus station:

Platform	Stop	Route number	Destination	Locations/roads serving
1	A	620	Noosa Heads	Noosa Drive
1	A	626	Tewantin	Noosa Heads
1	A	627	Tewantin	Noosa Heads
1	A	629	Tewantin	Noosa Heads, Noosa Civic, Noosaville
1	A	630	Nambour	Noosa Heads, Eumundi
1	A	631	Nambour	Noosa Heads, Tewantin, Cooroy, Eumundi, Yandina
1	A	632	Cooran	Noosa Civic, Tewantin, Cooroy, Pomona
2	B	620	Sunshine Plaza	Peregian Beach, Coolum Beach, Marcoola
2	B	622	Sunshine Plaza	Peregian Beach, Coolum Beach, Airport
2	B	626	Sunrise Beach	Solway Drive
2	B	627	Sunshine Beach	Ben Lexcen Drive
2	B	628	Noosa Parklands	Noosa Village, Noosa Civic, Tewantin
2	C	All long-distance services to services to Agnes Water, Brisbane, Cairns and Hervey Bay provided by Greyhound Australia and Premier Motor Service.		
