= Lake MacDonald =

Lake MacDonald may refer to:

- Lake Macdonald, Queensland, a suburb of the Sunshine Coast, Queensland
- Lake Macdonald, on the border of the Northern Territory and Western Australia
- Six Mile Creek Dam, the reservoir of which is known as Lake Macdonald

== See also ==
- Lake McDonald (disambiguation)
