= Tewantin National Park =

National park in Australia

- IUCN category II (national park)
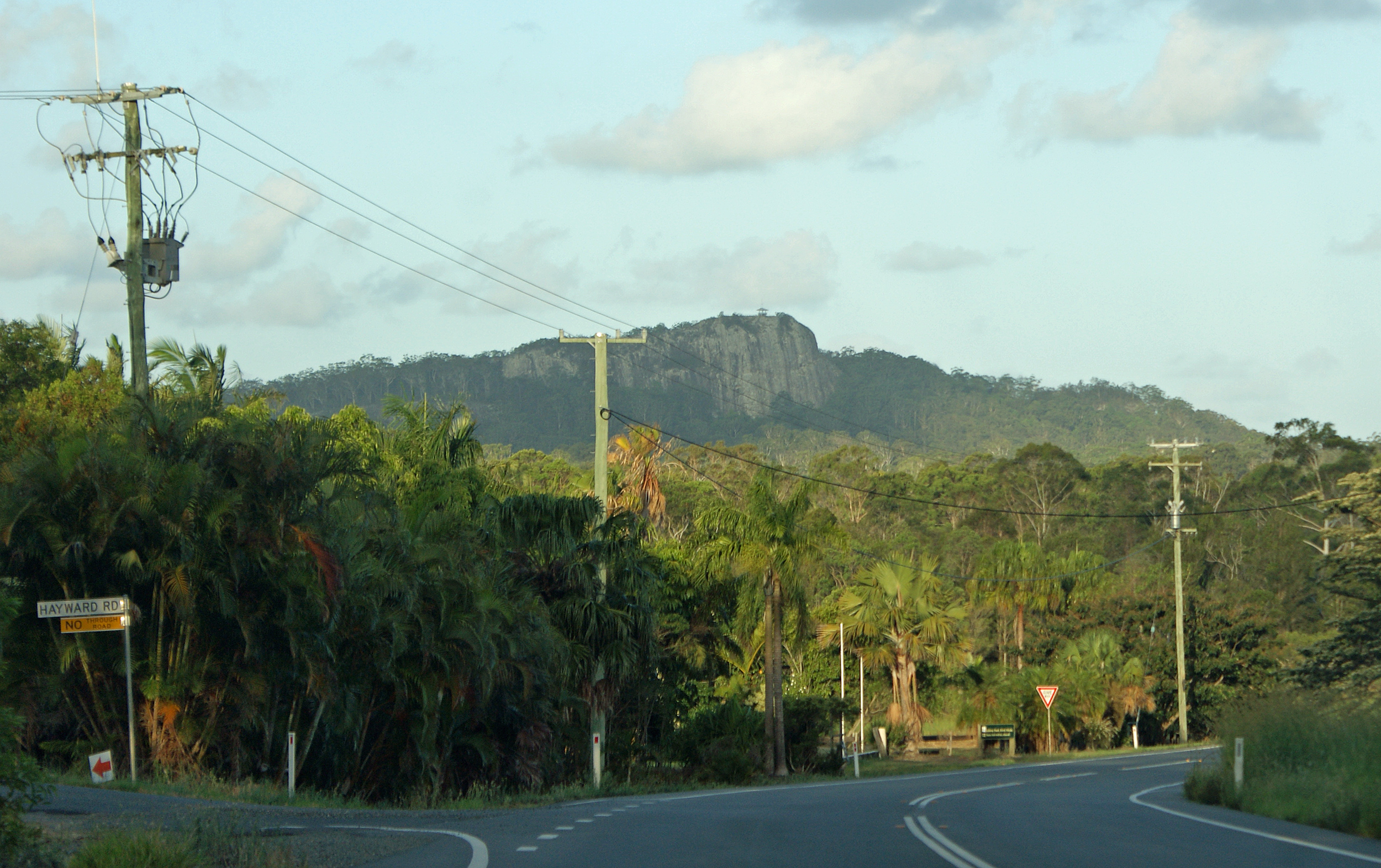
- Mount Tinbeerwah, 2013

- Location within Queensland
- Location: Queensland
- Nearest city: Tewantin
- Coordinates: 26°23′5″S 152°58′46″E
- Area: 13 km^{2} (5.0 sq mi)
- Governing body: Queensland Parks and Wildlife Service

The Tewantin National Park is a 13 square kilometre national park in Queensland, Australia. It consists of five individual areas west of Noosa Heads in the Wide Bay-Burnett region about 115 kilometres north of Brisbane and 125 km south of Hervey Bay. The park is divided into disconnected sections within Lake Macdonald, Tinbeerwah, Tewantin and Noosaville.

The national park protects coastal rainforest, bright eucalyptus forest and the last remnants of Wallum Heath between Noosa and Cooroy. Mount Tinbeerwah (265 m) is composed of solidified lava, which was created by volcanic activity millions of years ago. In its surroundings you can find the endangered swamp stringybark (Eucalyptus conglomerata) with its many trunks, gray, fibrous bark and bunches of white flowers.

Many amphibians live in the park, including the nearly endangered tusked frog (Adelotus brevis) and the endangered or threatened green-thighed frog, wallum froglet, and giant barred frog. About 70 different bird species have been observed in the park, including the Red-browed treecreeper.

== 2017 expansion project ==
In October 2017 the Noosa Council approved a motion to raise funds from the environment levy to jointly purchase the land rights of 1,492ha of the Yurol State Forest and Ringtail State Forest from HQPlantations. The Department of Environment and Science, Noosa Council and Noosa Parks Association are equally sharing the estimated $3.5M cost. A further 900ha not subject to HQPlantations long term harvesting is intended to become national park as soon as possible. The project will more than double the size of the Tewantin National Park to become 38 square kilometres with it bordering Cooroy, Pomona and Cootharaba.

== Access ==
The national park is accessible from the Cooroy-Noosa Road.

== Facilities ==
Camping is not allowed, but there are designated trails. Climbing, mountain biking and horseback riding are permitted.

== See also ==
- Protected areas of Queensland
