= Cooroy–Noosa Road =

Road route in Queensland, Australia

Cooroy–Noosa Road Queensland

General information
- Type: Road
- Length: 12.5 km (7.8 mi)
- Route number(s): State Route 6

Major junctions
- West end: Cooroy Connection Road, Cooroy
- Diamond Street; Sunrise Road; Gyndier Drive; Beckmans Road; St Andrews Drive
- East end: Butler Street, Tewantin

Location(s)
- Major suburbs: Lake Macdonald, Tinbeerwah

Cooroy–Noosa Road is a continuous 12.5-kilometre (7.8 mi) road-route in the Noosa local government area of Queensland, Australia. It is signed as 'State Route 6' and is a state-controlled district road (number 142) for most of its length.

== Route description ==
The road, known locally as Diamond Street, starts at an intersection with the Cooroy Connection Road, known locally as Elm Street, in the locality of Cooroy. It runs east for a short distance before leaving Diamond Street, where it turns north-east as Tewantin Road. It then turns east as it leaves Cooroy and enters the locality of Lake Macdonald, where the name changes to Cooroy–Noosa Road. Continuing generally north-east by east it crosses Lake Macdonald and Tinbeerwah, where it passes the exit to Sunrise Road to the south-east, before entering Tewantin. At an intersection with Gyndier Drive to the south-west it changes from state-controlled to council responsibility. Reaching a roundabout intersection with Beckmans Road to the south, Cooroy–Noosa Road continues north-east while State Route 6 turns south. The road continues north-east and east, reaching a roundabout intersection with St Andrews Drive to the south. From there it runs north-east to an intersection with Butler Street, where it ends.

From Butler Street a series of roads and streets carry traffic through Tewantin and Noosaville to Noosa Heads, a further 8 kilometres (5.0 mi), ending at a roundabout intersection of Noosa Drive, Sunshine Beach Road and Grant Street. These streets are: Butler Street, Poinciana Avenue, Sidoni Street, Doonella Street, Memorial Avenue, Hilton Terrace, Gympie Terrace, Weyba Road, and Noosa Drive.

The road is fully sealed to at least a two-lane standard. It is part of the shortest route to Noosa Heads from Gympie and all points north or west of Gympie.

A new two lane roundabout to replace the previous intersection with Beckmans Road was opened late in 2022. It is the first stage of a project to enable more traffic to bypass the streets of Tewantin.

In 2019, a planning study to determine possible improvements to this road was completed. Also, a study considered options to upgrade two intersections in Cooroy in the same year.

== Intersecting state-controlled road ==
The following state-controlled intersects with Cooroy–Noosa Road:

=== Cooroy Connection Road ===
Cooroy Connection Road
- Location: Bruce Highway, Cooroy to Bruce Highway, Black Mountain
- Length: 7.9 km (4.9 mi)
- Route number: 6

Cooroy Connection Road is a state-controlled district road (number 145), part of which is rated as a local road of regional significance (LRRS). It leaves the Bruce Highway in the south of Cooroy, runs north through the town, and rejoins the highway in Black Mountain, a distance of 7.9 kilometres (4.9 mi). Part of it is signed as State Route 6.

== History ==
Cooroy became the centre of a timber industry from 1863, with two sawmills soon established. As land was cleared it was used for dairying and fruit growing. Cooroy railway station was opened in 1891. The Bruce Highway passed through the town until 1994.

In 1869, Tewantin was a timber town and the river port for the Noosa district.

In the 1800s, Noosa Heads was a centre for the timber and milling industries. In the late 1920s a tourism industry developed, with cafes and tourist accommodation being built along the beachfront.

== Major intersections ==
All distances are from Google Maps. The entire road is within the Noosa local government area.

Location	km	mi	Destinations	Notes
Cooroy	0	0.0	Cooroy Connection Road – north – Black Mountain, Bruce Highway – Cooroy Connection Road – south – Cooroy, Bruce Highway	Western end of Cooroy–Noosa Road. Road continues east as State Route 6.
Cooroy	0.14	0.087	Diamond Street – east – Cooroy	Road continues north–east as Tewantin Road.
Tinbeerwah	7.6	4.7	Sunrise Road – south–east – Eumundi	Road continues east.
Tewantin	9.9	6.2	Gyndier Drive – south–west – Tinbeerwah	Eastern end of state-controlled section. Road continues east as a council responsibility.
Tewantin	10.9	6.8	Beckmans Road – south – Noosaville	State Route 6 turns south. Road continues north-east with no route number.
Tewantin	12.1	7.5	St Andrews Drive – south – Tewantin	Road continues north–east.
Tewantin	12.5	7.8	Butler Street – south–east – Tewantin – north–east – Tewantin	Eastern end of Cooroy–Noosa Road. Traffic for Noosaville or Noosa Heads continues north–east on Butler Street.
1.000 mi = 1.609 km; 1.000 km = 0.621 mi

== See also ==
- List of numbered roads in Queensland
