= Cooroy Mountain, Queensland =

Cooroy Mountain Queensland
- Coordinates: 26.4319°S 152.9511°E
- Population: 148 (2021 census)
  - Density: 16.09/km^{2} (41.7/sq mi)
- Postcode(s): 4563
- Elevation: 100–422 m (328–1,385 ft)
- Area: 9.2 km^{2} (3.6 sq mi)
- Time zone: AEST (UTC+10:00)
- Location: 15.2 km (9 mi) WSW of Tewantin; 49.9 km (31 mi) NNW of Mooloolaba; 134 km (83 mi) N of Brisbane
- LGA(s): Shire of Noosa
- State electorate(s): Noosa
- Federal division(s): Wide Bay
Suburbs around Cooroy Mountain:
Lake MacDonald	Lake MacDonald	Tinbeerwah
Cooroy	Cooroy Mountain	Tinbeerwah
Eerwah Vale	Eumundi	Doonan

Cooroy Mountain is a rural locality in the Shire of Noosa, Queensland, Australia. In the 2021 census, Cooroy Mountain had a population of 148 people.

== Geography ==
Mount Cooroy is in the south-east of the locality (26.4325°S 152.9533°E) and rises to 422 metres (1,385 ft) above sea level. It is within the Mount Cooroy Conservation Park.

Apart from the protected area, the remainder of the locality is used for a mix of rural residential housing and grazing on native vegetation.

== History ==
Cooroy Mountain's name came from Mount Cooroy, which was originally called Coorooey, from the Aboriginal word for possum, kurui.

Kuri'bigil'ba is the name of Cooroy Mountain in the dialect of the Kabi speaking aboriginal peoples of this area. It means the place where the Sun God came down to Dha (Earth). It is believed the mountain turned yellow once a year due to the flowering of an unknown tree. Most likely due to the endemic silky oak tree (Grevillea robusta) which has glabrous yellowish orange flowers from around September to November.

The Kabi Kabi people are the traditional owners of the land. While the Kabi people and their language group are not extinct, many are no longer in the local area of Cooroy mountain as a result of having been moved out of the area as a result of government policies in the past.

Between 2008 and 2013, Cooroy Mountain (and the rest of the Shire of Noosa) was within Sunshine Coast Region, due to an enforced amalgamation of local government areas that was subsequently reversed.

== Demographics ==
In the 2016 census, Cooroy Mountain had a population of 136 people.

In the 2021 census, Cooroy Mountain had a population of 148 people.

== Education ==
There are no schools in Cooroy Mountain. The nearest government primary schools are Cooroy State School in neighbouring Cooroy to the west and Eumundi State School in neighbouring Eumundi to the south. The nearest government secondary school is the Noosa District State High School, which has its junior campus in Pomona to the north-west and its senior campus in neighbouring Cooroy to the west.
