= Tinbeerwah, Queensland =

Tinbeerwah
- Suburb
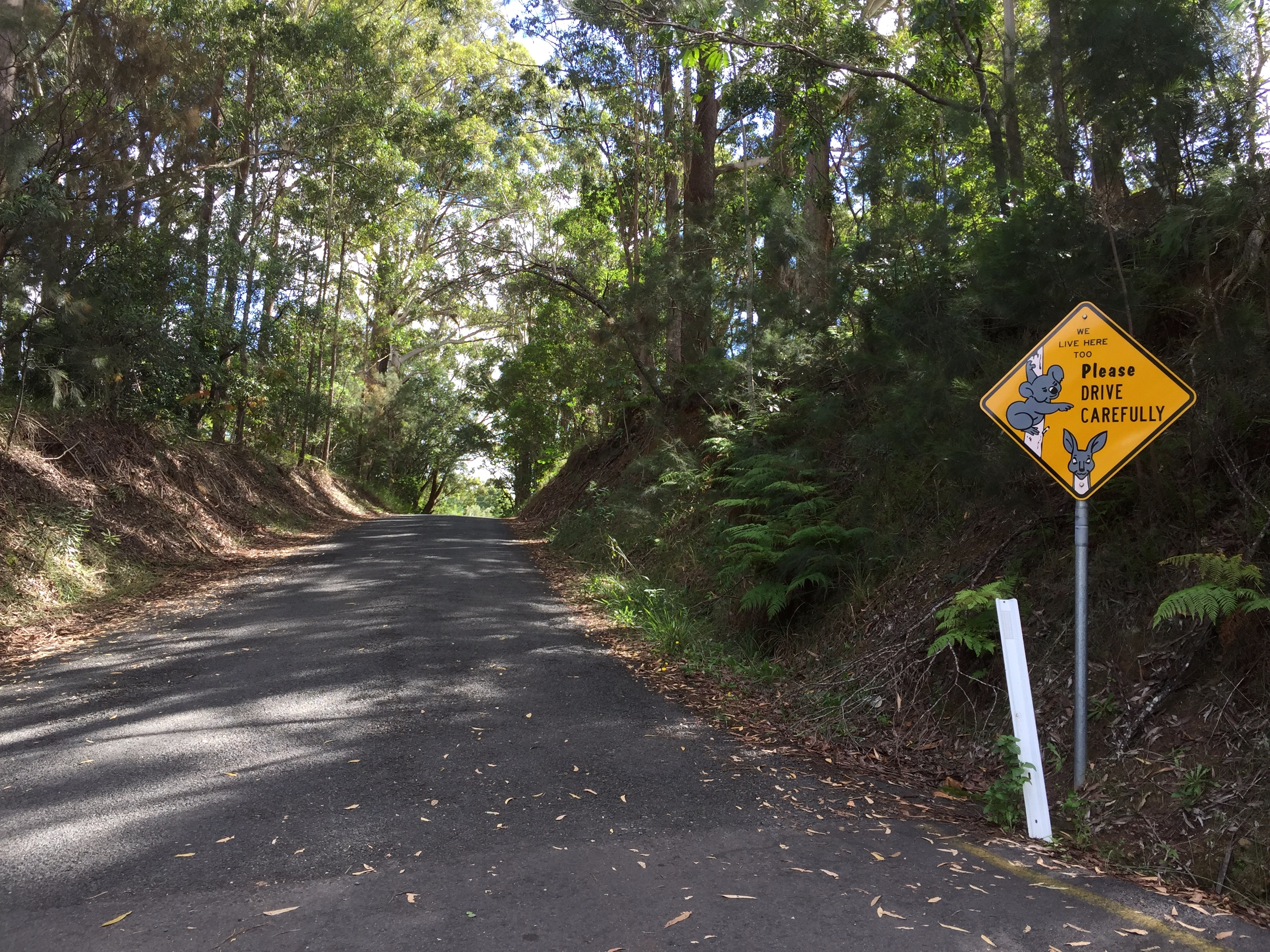
- Coveys Rd, Tinbeerwah, 2016

- Interactive map of Tinbeerwah
- Coordinates: 26.4066°S 152.9761°E
- Country: Australia
- State: Queensland
- LGA: Shire of Noosa
- Location: 5.6 km (3.5 mi) W of Tewantin; 9.5 km (5.9 mi) E of Cooroy; 18.8 km (11.7 mi) SE of Pomona; 40.7 km (25.3 mi) N of Maroochydore; 142 km (88 mi) N of Brisbane

Government
  - State electorate: Noosa
  - Federal division: Wide Bay

Area
  - Total: 22.1 km^{2} (8.5 sq mi)

Population
  - Total: 1,160 (2021 census)
  - Density: 52.5/km^{2} (135.9/sq mi)
- Time zone: UTC+10:00 (AEST)
- Postcode: 4563
Suburbs around Tinbeerwah
Lake Macdonald	Cooroibah	Cooroibah
Lake Macdonald	Tinbeerwah	Tewantin
Cooroy Mountain	Eumundi	Doonan

Tinbeerwah is a semi-rural locality in the Shire of Noosa, Queensland, Australia. In the 2021 census, Tinbeerwah had a population of 1,160 people.

== Geography ==
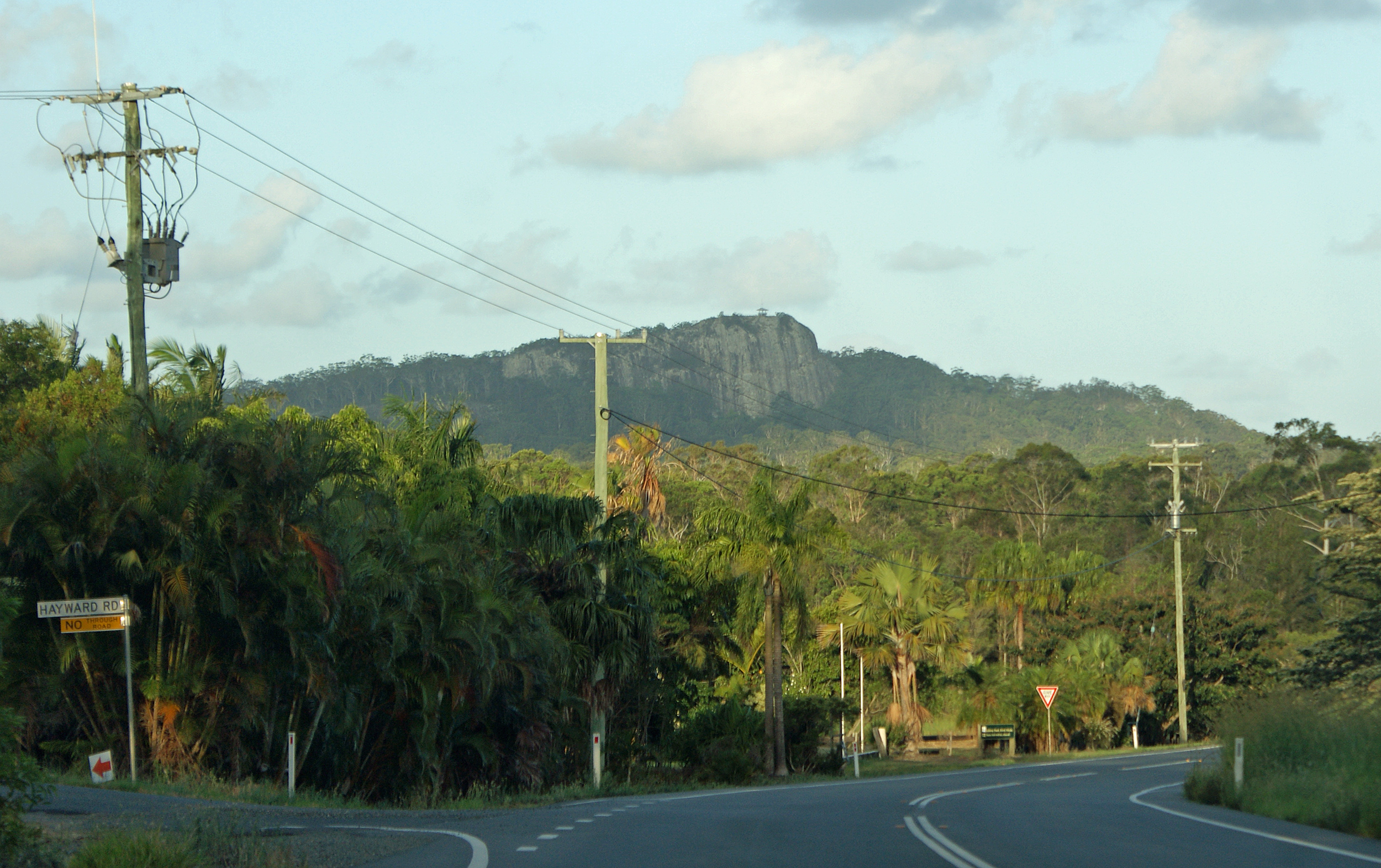
Mount Tinbeerwah

The Cooroy-Noosa Road runs through from west (Lake Macdonald) to east (Tewantin).

Mount Tinbeerwah is in the north of locality (26.3902°S 152.9752°E) rising 265 metres (869 ft) above sea level.

The north of the locality is within the Tewantin National Park.

== History ==
The name Tinbeerwah is Aboriginal for "place of grasstrees" or "high hill climbing up".

Tinbeerwah Provisional School opened on 2 September 1914 under teacher Beesie Pollock. On 1 September 1916, it became Tinbeerwah State School. It closed on 9 August 1963 due to transport issues. It was on the junction of Sivyers Road and Cooroy-Noosa Road (26.4004°S 152.9602°E). The school building was relocated to 1 Doonella Street, Teewantin, where it is used as a kindergarten. The school's site became the Tinbeerwah School Park with a plaque and a cairn commemorating the school.

In 1987, 12-year-old Noosa schoolgirl Sian Kingi was raped and murdered in Tinbeerwah after being abducted from Noosa Heads.

Between 2008 and 2013, Tinbeerwah (and the rest of the Shire of Noosa) was within Sunshine Coast Region but the Shire of Noosa was re-established in 2014.

== Demographics ==
In the 2011 census, Tinbeerwah had a population of 1,262 people.

In the 2016 census, Tinbeerwah had a population of 974 people.

In the 2021 census, Tinbeerwah had a population of 1,160 people.

== Education ==
There are no schools in Tinbeerwah. The nearest government primary schools are:

- Tewantin State School in neighbouring Tewantin to the east
- Eumundi State School in neighbouring Eumundi to the south
- Cooroy State School in Cooroy to the south-west
- Noosaville State School in Noosaville to the east

The nearest government secondary school is Noosa District State High School which has its junior campus in Pomona to the north-west and its senior campus in Cooroy to the south-west.
