= Noosa River Caravan Park =

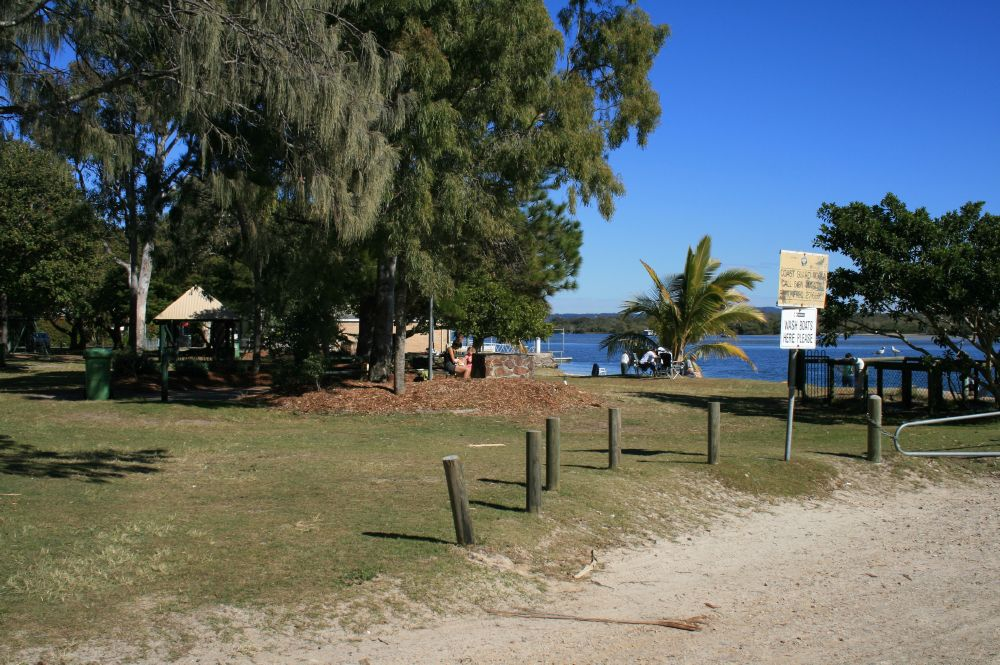
- Noosa River Caravan Park, 2007

- Location within Queensland Location within Australia
- 26.3945°S 153.0739°E
- Location: Russell Street, Noosaville, Shire of Noosa, Queensland, Australia

History
- Design period: 1919–1930s (interwar period)
- Built: 1929–

Queensland Heritage Register
- Official name: Noosa River Caravan Park
- Type: state heritage (built)
- Designated: 3 April 2009
- Reference no.: 602706
- Significant period: 1929–
- Significant components: other – recreation/entertainment: component

Noosa River Caravan Park is a heritage-listed caravan park at Russell Street, Noosaville, Shire of Noosa, Queensland, Australia. It was built from 1929 onwards. It was added to the Queensland Heritage Register on 3 April 2009.

== History ==
Noosa River Caravan Park is located between Russell Street and the Noosa River at Noosaville at a site known as Munna Point. It was established in 1956 as a reserve for camping and recreation under the trusteeship of the Noosa Shire Council. Previously the land had been reserved for public purposes from 1884 and camping on the site is recorded from c. 1929. As motorised transport became dominant and leisure time increased, particularly post-World War II, this site was established as a caravan park to meet the needs of the growing number of caravanning holiday-makers whose destination was the North Coast. Its still-water river-side location, easily accessible by car from the major Tewantin to Noosa road, and its range of accommodation and amenities, which have evolved over time, demonstrate all the features of a typical caravan park.

This site was originally part of a Reserve for Aboriginal Mission Purposes that extended from a point east of Tewantin to Noosa Heads following the Noosa River, and south along the coastline, as shown on an 1871 cadastral map. One early settler in the area recorded that Munna Point was a favourite camping place and fishing spot for indigenous people and a corroborree site. The Aboriginal Mission Reserve was cancelled in 1878 and a Noosa Heads township was gazetted in the following year. In 1884 an 80-acre Reserve for Public Purposes, which incorporated all of Munna Point including the future site of the Reserve for Camping and Recreation, was declared.

The North Coast region began to develop as a holiday destination at the end of the 19th century but poor access inhibited its growth. Tewantin, Maroochydore and Caloundra developed as recreational destinations from the 1880s. This reflected the preferences of the Victorian era for a calm shallow stretch of river or still-water seaside location which allowed safe bathing, boating and fishing. Camping along rivers and on reserves occurred especially over the Christmas-New Year period.

All three settlements remained small before World War I, used mainly by their small hinterland populations rather than visitors from Brisbane. North Coast tourists arrived by train at stations between Landsborough and Cooroy before using local forms of motorised transport to reach coastal destinations from railway stations between Landsborough to Cooroy. Tewantin was the largest of the three owing to its pre-existing role as a port settlement serving Gympie and the local timber industry.

As transport networks improved accessibility, the resort settlements became more popular. During the interwar period Tewantin remained more prominent than its neighbouring settlement at Noosa Heads and it continued to be important even after vehicular access was opened to Noosa Heads in 1929. Tewantin was the commercial centre and most holiday facilities were located there. A wooden swimming enclosure was located in the river adjacent to the wharves on the western bank at Tewantin from as early as 1915. The Parkyn family had a jetty, boat hire and bait business upstream from the later site of the Lake Doonella Bridge.

North Coast tourist development was fostered by substantial improvements to the region's road transport network during the interwar period. From the early 1920s, road works by local councils and the Main Roads Commission improved connections between inland and coastal settlements. Improved road access from Brisbane and inland towns during the 1930s increased the popularity of the North Coast as a resort. During the 1930s most of the Bruce Highway to Nambour was bituminised. The construction of the bridges and road linking Tewantin and Noosa boosted the latter's prospects and the settlement was gazetted as a township in 1930.

The opening in 1929 of the Doonella Bridge at Tewantin over Lake Doonella and the Weyba Creek Bridge instigated development at Noosaville and Munna Point. Tewantin businessman Jack Parkyn, who owned the launch Miss Tewantin, diverted the boat from her previous major use as a down-river ferry to carrying tourist groups on cruises as far up the river and its lake system as Boreen Point. He purchased land at the more easterly section of Noosaville, known as Munna Point, where he developed a holiday complex. Additionally, he bought other individual allotments in the Noosaville area where he constructed holiday houses and flats. On a block of allotments in Russell Street, Munna Point, he erected a complex consisting of a row of six holiday homes, which proved to be very successful, and a general store to provide items needed by local residents and the holidaymakers who were staying in his houses. Fishing was a very popular pastime on the Noosa River and Jack Parkyn encouraged visitors holidaying in his houses to participate in this sport by providing a rowing boat with each holiday house he let an entrepreneurial action that was well received by his patrons. The advent of personal motor transport increased in interest in camping and caravanning by holidaymakers in the downstream reaches of the river. On the side of Russell Street opposite his holiday house complex in Munna Point, Jack Parkyn began clearing the existing reserve to open it for these purposes. Undergrowth was cleared to prevent the breeding of midges. With the establishment of the Munna Point venture, visitor numbers to the facility continued to increase.

With the considerable growth of car ownership during the interwar period caravans began appearing on Queensland roads. Caravans offered freedom for the affluent motor tourist, without sacrificing comfort. As a "home away from home", fitted with modern conveniences, caravans were markedly different from the simplicity of camping under a canvas tent. Caravans were an alternative to local hotels and guesthouses, the latter being in high demand during peak seasons, and providing varying levels of quality.

Post-World War II the popularity of caravans became more noticeable as the tourist industry resumed its pre-war expansion predicated on improved roads. In 1946, The Road Ahead was noting the numbers of motor tourists from Victoria and New South Wales holidaying in Queensland. There was estimated to be 12,000 caravans on Australia roads by 1948/49. The Caravan Club of Australia was formed in 1948 and a Brisbane branch had been established by 1951, offering advice to visitors.

The Royal Automobile Club of Queensland (RACQ) fostered the popularity of caravanning in Queensland by pushing for changes to restrictive road laws and improved caravanning facilities. The 1950 Queensland Traffic Act limited cars towing caravans to 25 miles per hour (40 km/h), compared to 50 for cars. By 1960 this speed had been lifted to 40. From 1949 when increasing numbers of caravans were appearing on North Coast roads the RACQ was urging local authorities on tourist routes to provide 'well equipped camps "to prepare for the boom". In 1954, RACQ Secretary Len King drew attention to the poor state of Queensland's caravan parks, noting that the average caravanner spent £5 in the local area in which they stayed. King accompanied the club's vice-president J.M Marshall on a tour to north Queensland, with the objective of demonstrating to local authorities and the press the lack of adequate provisions for caravanning tourists. The club published Modern Caravan Parks offering advice to local authorities and others interested in establishing caravan parks.

The growth of motor tourism during the 1950s was stimulated by the lifting of petrol rationing by the Menzies government, the increased affordability of cars for the wider population and longer paid holidays. Other factors that influenced the development of tourism on the Sunshine Coast were the popular taste for beach holidays and population growth in South-East Queensland. This in turn influenced the number of caravan users and development of caravan parks. Development of the Noosa area was boosted by the opening of the coastal road (David Low Way) in 1960 linking the main resorts at Caloundra, Maroochydore and Noosa.

Intrinsically linked to the rise of motor transport and improved roads were caravan parks. From the late 1930s, private developers were the first to offer caravan parks with modern facilities and structured layout. By 1960, a mix of public and private parks had been established on what was becoming known as the Sunshine Coast.

The site of Noosa River Caravan Park (about 2.98 hectares (7.4 acres)) was reserved as a Reserve for Caravan and Camping Purposes in 1956 by its excision from the 80 acres (32 ha) Reserve for Public Purposes at Munna Point. This early reservation of the Noosa River Caravan Park as a caravan and camping reserve places it at the vanguard of the caravanning period. Queensland caravan registration figures increased substantially from 2320 in 1953 to 5406 in 1961. Caravan manufacturers and saleyards (at least 18 in Brisbane by 1960) took their place on outer suburban commercial strips. Rental and second hand vans were common.

In the early 1950s, relatively few sites in Queensland offered the necessary infrastructure to accommodate caravanning needs. Calls for improvements to sites and facilities accompanied increased caravan usage. Advocates looked to the United States and the United Kingdom for examples of best practice in caravan parks. Caravanning guides and journals offered suggestions for layout and features. These were a more formal arrangement of space than camping, characterised by grid or circular layouts and landscaped grounds.

Features common to caravan parks include location near a main road, a prominent entrance, on-site caretakers/proprietors, recreation room, levelled concrete slabs, landscaped grounds, hose connections, electricity, large amenities block with washing machines and hot showers. Many parks offered on-site vans for rental. Park listings in 1961 record "tradespeople" calling to parks, to deliver essentials like bread and milk.

Continual updating of facilities in caravan parks has also been a common trend. Development of private and public caravan parks expanded during the 1960s. An inspection by RACQ club officials in 1962 of the state's caravan and camping grounds noted the progress through local government efforts, especially advancements by privately owned parks. Many council camping grounds became known as "caravan parks" as site facilities became more geared to their use. Over time, investment in facilities at Council-operated caravan parks increased as tourism came to play a greater economic role in the region. In 1966 a new amenities block was finished at Munna Point and it was decided by the Noosa Shire Council to bring rates for use in line with those of Noosa Heads and Tewantin "in view of campers using additional electrical appliances there was a necessity to review scale of charges" according to Shire Health Inspector. On the coastal strip between Noosa and Caloundra in 1968, there were 24 sites operating as caravan parks and five out of the six council camping reserves offered facilities for caravans, including power. This was a significant increase since 1960, marking the decade as a high point for caravan park development on the Sunshine Coast.

By the 1970s, caravanning was a well established and common leisure practice. A self-contained holiday in a caravan became an annual ritual for many campers, often returning to the same park year after year, members of a holiday community linked by shared experiences of place.

After private houses, caravans were the most popular form of holiday accommodation in Australia in 1976. They were significant contributors to local economies in tourist regions, through accommodation fees and flow on effects to other local businesses.

During the last 25 years development on the North Coast has been especially rapid with the population of the Sunshine Coast growing at around twice the rate of the State as a whole. The Sunshine Coast is now Queensland's third largest tourist destination in terms of holiday accommodation after the Gold Coast and Cairns. This has meant that although there is still strong demand for caravan park accommodation, there is also increased pressure for these strategically and attractively located, relatively undeveloped sites to be utilised for other accommodation types or returned to parkland. The closure of caravan parks in coastal areas began in the 1970s as more intensive commercial and residential development occurred in the region. In 2007, there are 16 caravan parks remaining on the coastal strip and no council camping reserves. At Munna Point the bulk of the 80 acres (32 ha) Reserve for Public Purposes adjacent to the Noosa River Caravan Park was cut up for development in 1980 and this land has subsequently become the site of apartment blocks.

Noosa River Caravan Park has continued to operate as affordable riverside holiday accommodation amidst the extensive development on the Sunshine Coast. Future land use of caravan park sites, particularly on Crown land, remains a contentious topic. Local communities and visitors have come to attach special significance to caravan parks as places of leisure as has been demonstrated by their efforts to protect council-operated caravan parks on Crown land. The significance of this site as a social space and place of leisure for visitors and the local community has a long history. As a site intrinsically linked to the development of tourism in Noosa Shire since the 1920s at least, it is an important part of Queensland's cultural heritage.

== Description ==
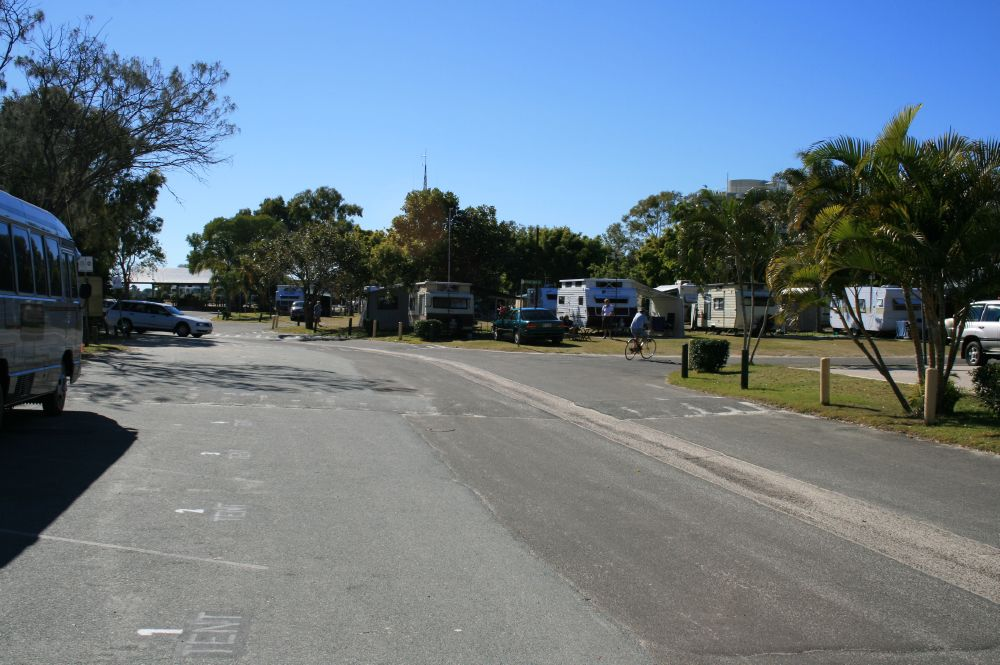
Caravans at the Noosa River Caravan Park, 2007

Occupying 2.98 hectares (7.4 acres) of waterfront land off Russell Street at Noosaville, the Noosa River Caravan Park is a green and leafy site with grassed areas and scatterings of trees, shrubs and hedges on the sandy river front at Munna Point. Bounded by the Noosa River to the northwest and Weyba Creek to the northeast, the park offers expansive views up and down the Noosa River and across to Noosa Sound.

The park offers powered and unpowered van and tent sites, river front beaches and a day picnic area. Facilities include a large open camp kitchen shed, a boat ramp access to Noosa River and two masonry amenities blocks. A caretaker's residence and office stand near the entrance off Russell Street. There are a number of parking spaces along the northwest side of the spine road.

The park is organised off a spine road which runs the length of the site with finger roadways running off to the southeast. The powered van sites each front a finger roadway and have a concrete slab to accommodate a van. There are a number of unpowered van sites to the northeast end off the circular roadway that terminates the spine. Running along the river side of the spine road from the park entrance there are the day picnic area, boat ramp and an unpowered tent area terminating at the beach at the north end. A number of powered tent sites are located to the rear of the park at the northeast and south ends. The grassed and treed day picnic area fronts the sandy edge of the Noosa River and accommodates picnic tables, BBQs and a fish gutting table.

There is no permanent accommodation offered (maximum stay is three months) and the park does not offer on-site cabins or vans.

== Heritage listing ==
Noosa River Caravan Park was listed on the Queensland Heritage Register on 3 April 2009 having satisfied the following criteria.

The place is important in demonstrating the evolution or pattern of Queensland's history.

The Noosa River Caravan Park is important in demonstrating the pattern of development of the Sunshine Coast, an important region for the development of seaside tourism in Queensland. Originally designated as part of an 80-acre reserve for public purposes in 1884, the Noosa River Caravan Park has sustained its land use as a camping/caravan park from at least the 1920s and is important evidence of the pattern of development of the tourist industry on the Sunshine Coast. The Noosa River Caravan Park illustrates the policy of colonial governments of reserving Crown land for public camping and recreation purposes in prime waterside areas, a practice which was common, but is now rare.

The Noosa River Caravan Park is important in demonstrating the evolution of tourist accommodation on the Sunshine Coast, an historically important region for the development of caravan parks in Queensland. It does this through its beginnings a riverside camping ground dating from the 1920s, then as a caravan park created at the vanguard of the boom period for caravanning and later through periodic updating of its facilities in response to contemporary demands. The site was intrinsically linked to the phenomenon of caravanning that resulted from the rise of mass motoring Australia-wide in the second half of the 20th century.

The place is important in demonstrating the principal characteristics of a particular class of cultural places.

The Noosa River Caravan Park represents a land use and custom that has made a strong contribution to the pattern and evolution of Queensland's tourism history. It is an excellent example of a camping and caravanning site that has been used by Queensland holiday-makers since the 1920s. Located adjacent to an area of quiet water allowing easy access for swimming, boating and fishing activities, Noosa River Caravan Park is important in illustrating the essential characteristics of early camping reserves.

Noosa River Caravan Park demonstrates the principal characteristics of a waterside caravan park. On a prime waterfront location with immediate access to still water, the place offers opportunities to interact with, and appreciate the natural beauty of its setting. Easily accessed by motor vehicles, and organised around a simple grid of streets and landscaping, the Park offers a range of accommodation types, which are served by a range of facilities that include ablutions blocks, barbeques and picnic areas. The range of accommodation and amenities has evolved over time to meet the changing needs of its clientele, while remaining low-scale and relatively affordable for holidaymakers.
