= Cooroibah, Queensland =

Cooroibah
- Suburb
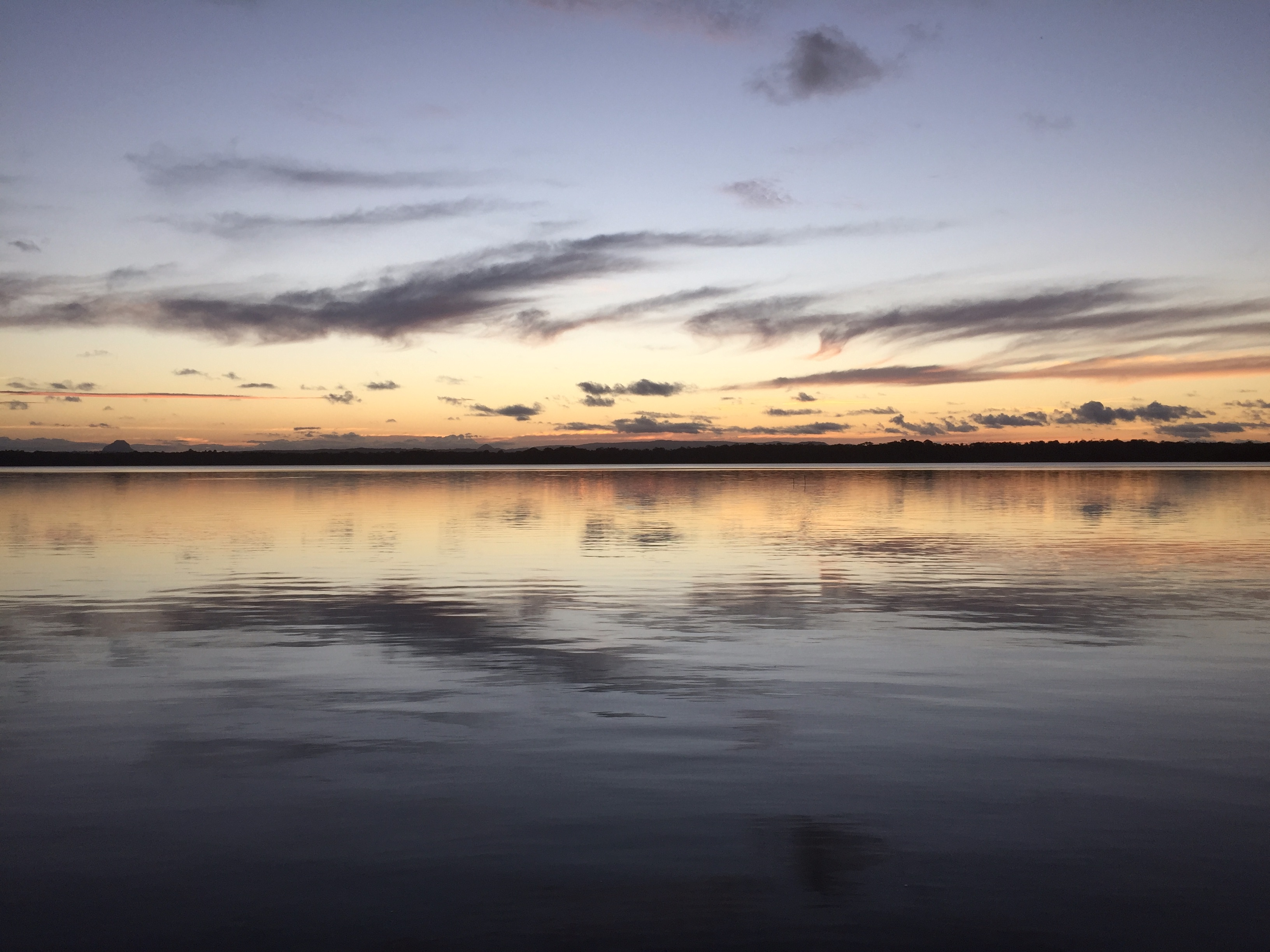
- Lake Cooroibah at sunset

- Interactive map of Cooroibah
- Coordinates: 26.3319°S 153.0011°E
- Country: Australia
- State: Queensland
- City: Noosa
- LGA: Shire of Noosa
- Location: 7.2 km (4.5 mi) N of Tewantin; 16.2 km (10.1 mi) NW of Sunshine Beach; 44.8 km (27.8 mi) N of Maroochydore; 150 km (93 mi) N of Brisbane

Government
  - State electorate: Noosa
  - Federal division: Wide Bay

Area
  - Total: 32.3 km^{2} (12.5 sq mi)

Population
  - Total: 2,178 (2021 census)
  - Density: 67.43/km^{2} (174.64/sq mi)
- Time zone: UTC+10:00 (AEST)
- Postcode: 4565
Suburbs around Cooroibah
Ringtail Creek	Ringtail Creek	Noosa North Shore
Lake Macdonald	Cooroibah	Noosa North Shore
Tinbeerwah	Tewantin	Noosa North Shore

Cooroibah is a locality in the Shire of Noosa, Queensland, Australia. In the 2021 census, Cooroibah had a population of 2,178 people.

== Geography ==
External videos
- Noosa river, between lake Cooroibah and lake Cootharaba

A section of the Great Sandy National Park has been established in the north of Cooroibah. The Noosa River marks part of the northeast boundary and the whole of Lake Cooroibah is part of the suburb. The southern boundary continues along part of Cooroibah Creek. The largest flood event recorded at Lake Cooroibah was 2.55 metres in 1992.

== History ==
The name is Aboriginal for "place of possums".

From 2008 to 2013, Cooroibah was within the Sunshine Coast Region due to the amalgamation and then de-amalgamation of the Shire of Noosa into the Sunshine Coast Region.

== Demographics ==
In the 2011 census, Cooroibah had a population of 1,744 people.

In the 2016 census, Cooroibah had a population of 2,041 people.

In the 2021 census, Cooroibah had a population of 2,178 people.

== Education ==
There are no schools in Cooroibah. The nearest government primary school is Tewantin State School in neighbouring Tewantin to the south. The nearest government secondary school is Sunshine Beach State High School in Sunshine Beach to the south-east.
