= Good Shepherd Lutheran College =

P-12 school in Noosaville, Australia

Coordinates: 26°24′31″S 153°02′58″E

- Noosaville, Queensland; Australia

Information
- Type: Independent
- Motto: Follow Me
- Established: 1986
- Headmaster: Jen Gibb
- Grades: P–12
- Enrolment: 1100
- Campus: 4.6 hectares (11 acres)
- Colours: Maroon, yellow, blue
- Website: www.gslc.qld.edu.au

Good Shepherd Lutheran College (Sometimes referred to as GSLC) is a Prep to Year 12 campus that serves the families of the Noosa district. It is located in Noosaville.

== History and development ==
The college is situated on 4.6 hectares of land (11 acres) which was once the site of the Noosa Drive-In theatre. In addition, the college has a licence to use oval space adjacent to its property, owned by the Noosa Shire Council. The College commenced its operations in 1985, using a temporary demountable building which was constructed through the generous support of local members of the Lutheran Congregation and the Lutheran Church of Australia.

The Junior school was opened on 28 January 1986 with an enrolment of 66 students. In 1992, the Junior School was handed over by the Parish to the Lutheran Church of Australia, Queensland District which opened Good Shepherd Lutheran College, offering classes from Year 1 to Year 8. In 1996, classes were offered from Prep to Year 12 for the first time.

An agreement was reached between the College and the Noosa Council in 2002 which provided for the acquisition of 1.1ha of additional land, on which a gymnasium, extra classrooms and a swimming pool are now located.

== House system ==
Four houses operate across the college as follows:

	Doonella	Laguna	Munna	Weyba
Origin	Lake	Bay	Point	Creek
Colour	Yellow	Blue	Green	Red
Mascot	Osprey	Dolphin	Wombat	Lizard
Symbol	Air	Water	Earth	Fire

== Googa Camp ==
In Semester Two of Year 10, students spend four weeks at Googa outdoor education centre. The centre is set in the ranges outside Blackbutt in the South Burnett region. This is an integral part of the Year 10 curriculum at Good Shepherd, attendance is considered compulsory.

== Services ==
The college provides a number of services and facilities to students, including a swimming pool, tennis and basketball courts, chapel (operated by Good Shepherd Lutheran Church), and private bus service.
