= Lake Macdonald, Queensland =

Lake Macdonald Sunshine Coast, Queensland
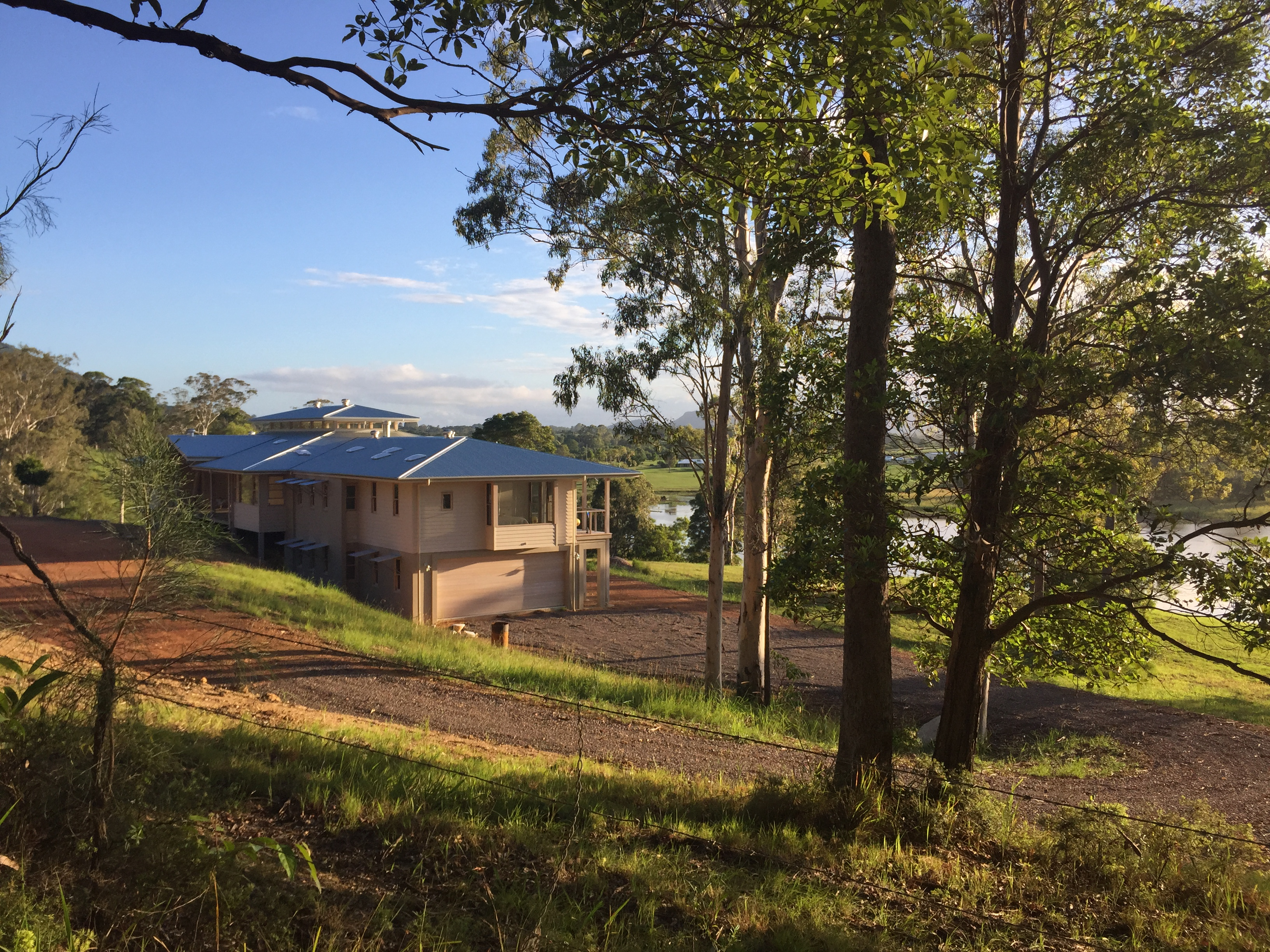
- House at Lake Macdonald

- Coordinates: 26.39°S 152.9386°E
- Population: 1,352 (2021 census)
  - Density: 51.02/km^{2} (132.14/sq mi)
- Postcode(s): 4563
- Area: 26.5 km^{2} (10.2 sq mi)
- Time zone: AEST (UTC+10:00)
- Location: 16.8 km (10 mi) W of Tewantin; 45.8 km (28 mi) NNW of Maroochydore; 132 km (82 mi) N of Brisbane
- LGA(s): Shire of Noosa
- State electorate(s): Noosa; Nicklin
- Federal division(s): Wide Bay
Suburbs around Lake Macdonald:
Pomona	Ringtail Creek	Cooroibah
Cooroy	Lake Macdonald	Tinbeerwah
Cooroy	Cooroy Mountain	Cooroy Mountain

Lake Macdonald is a rural locality in the Shire of Noosa, Queensland, Australia. In the 2021 census, Lake Macdonald had a population of 1,352 people.

== Geography ==
Located adjacent to the suburb is the Six Mile Creek Dam, a rock and earth-fill embankment dam across the Six Mile Creek that impounds the reservoir, called Lake Macdonald (26.3833°S 152.9333°E). The main purpose of the reservoir is for potable water supply of the Sunshine Coast region and for recreation.

The Cooroy-Noosa Road runs through from west to east.

== History ==
Between 2008 and 2013 Lake Macdonald (along with the rest of Shire of Noosa) was within the Sunshine Coast Region.

== Demographics ==
In the 2011 census, Lake Macdonald had a population of 1,129 people.

In the 2016 census, Lake Macdonald had a population of 1,363 people.

In the 2021 census, Lake Macdonald had a population of 1,352 people.

== Education ==
There are no schools in Lake Macdonald. The nearest government primary school is Cooroy State School in neighbouring Cooroy to the south-east. The nearest government secondary school is Noosa District State High School which has its junior campus (Years 7–9) in neighbouring Pomona to the north-east and its senior campus (Years 10–12) in Cooroy.

== Facilities ==
Lake Macdonald Water Treatment Plant is on Lake Macdonald Drive (26.3804°S 152.9326°E).

There are a number of facilities around the lake. There is a boat ramp and pontoon at Mary River Cod Park on Collwood Road for access to the lake (26.3809°S 152.9355°E). There is another boat ramp at Lake MacDonald Park on Lake MacDonald Drive (26.3854°S 152.9295°E). They are all managed by the South East Queensland Water Corp.

There are two jetties into the lake, one at the north of the lake at Lake MacDonald Drive (26.3825°S 152.9292°E) and one at the south of the lake (26.3829°S 152.9291°E). Both are managed by the Noosa Shire Council.
