= Six Mile Creek Dam =

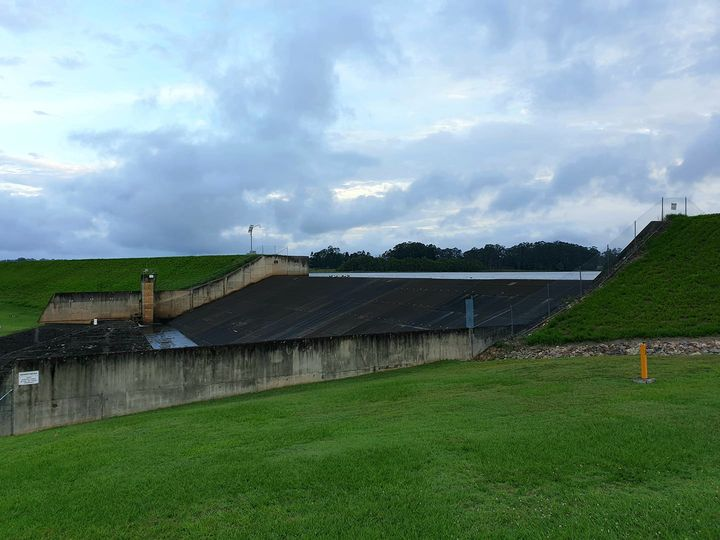
- Six Mile Creek Dam spillway in 2021

- Location of the Six Mile Creek Dam in Queensland
- Country: Australia
- Location: South East Queensland
- Coordinates: 26°22′52″S 152°55′48″E
- Purpose: Potable water supply; Recreation
- Status: Operational
- Opening date: 1965
- Operator: SEQ Water

Dam and spillways
- Type of dam: Embankment dam
- Impounds: Six Mile Creek
- Height: 15.7 m (52 ft)
- Length: 490 m (1,610 ft)
- Dam volume: 69×10^{3} m^{3} (2.4×10^{6} cu ft)
- Spillway type: Uncontrolled
- Spillway capacity: 1,147 m^{3}/s (40,500 cu ft/s)

Reservoir
- Creates: Lake Macdonald
- Total capacity: 8,018 ML (1.764×10^{9} imp gal; 2.118×10^{9} US gal)
- Catchment area: 49 km^{2} (19 sq mi)
- Surface area: 260 ha (640 acres)
- Website www.seqwater.com.au

The Six Mile Creek Dam (more commonly known as Lake MacDonald) is a rock and earth-fill embankment dam with an un-gated spillway across the Six Mile Creek that is located in the South East region of Queensland, Australia. The main purposes of the dam are for potable water supply of the Sunshine Coast region and for recreation. The impounded reservoir is called Lake Macdonald, named in memory of former Noosa Shire Council Chairman Ian MacDonald.

== Location and features ==
The dam is located 6 kilometres (3.7 mi) from Cooroy and 15 kilometres (9.3 mi) west of Noosa. The small settlement of Lake MacDonald is located adjacent to the dam. The primary inflow of the reservoir is Six Mile Creek.

Built in 1965 and raised by 3.6 metres in 1980, the rock and earthfill dam structure is 15.7 metres (52 ft) high and 490 metres (1,610 ft) long. The 69-thousand-cubic-metre (2.4×10^{6} cu ft) dam wall holds back the 8,018-megalitre (1.764×10^{9} imp gal; 2.118×10^{9} US gal) reservoir when at full capacity. From a catchment area of 49 square kilometres (19 sq mi) that includes much of the Tewantin National Park, the dam creates Lake Macdonald, with a surface area of 260 hectares (640 acres). The uncontrolled un-gated spillway has a discharge capacity of 1,147 cubic metres per second (40,500 cu ft/s). Initially managed by the Sunshine Coast Regional Council, management of the dam was transferred to Seqwater on 1 July 2008.

The dam reached its maximum recorded level of 1.97m over the spillway in February 2012.

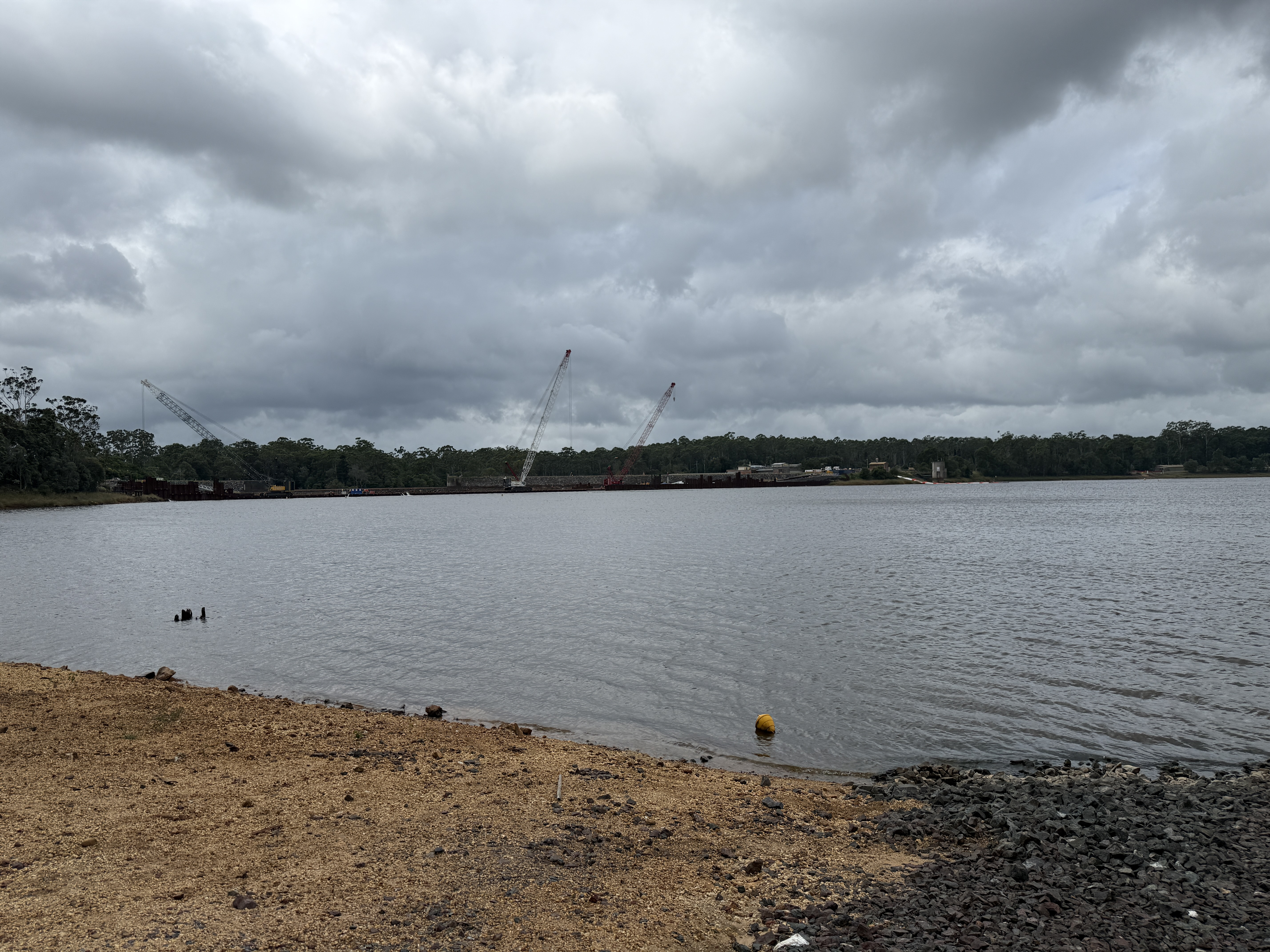
Six Mile Creek Dam Upgrade, 2026

In December 2017, the Queensland Government Initiated a $100 Million dollar dam wall safety upgrade to increase the capacity of the dam. By December 2024, the budget had run in excess of $127 million. The upgrade would consist of a combined ogee and labyrinth spillway design to ensure safe passage of fish and turtles downstream while efficiently managing outflows, with the lower ogee spillway operating at full supply level and the upper labyrinth spillway providing additional capacity during major flood events to protect the dam and earth embankments.

== Recreational activities ==
Within proximity of the dam, horse riding, boating and canoeing are permitted. The Noosa Botanic Gardens are located on the northwestern shoreline of Lake Macdonald.

The reservoir is stocked with Mary River cod, bass, yellowbelly, saratoga and snub nosed gar with endemic populations of tandans (eel tailed catfish) and the introduced spangled perch. A stocked impoundment permit is required to fish in the dam.

== Historical levels ==
Historical high water capacity percentages above 110% since recording began on 1 July 2008.

Date	Percentage
1 November 2017	113.4
8 October 2018	115.3
1 November 2020	119.9
14 February 2022	111.6
16 May 2022	113.4
30 January 2024	115.2

== See also ==
- List of dams in Queensland
