= Noosa Civic =

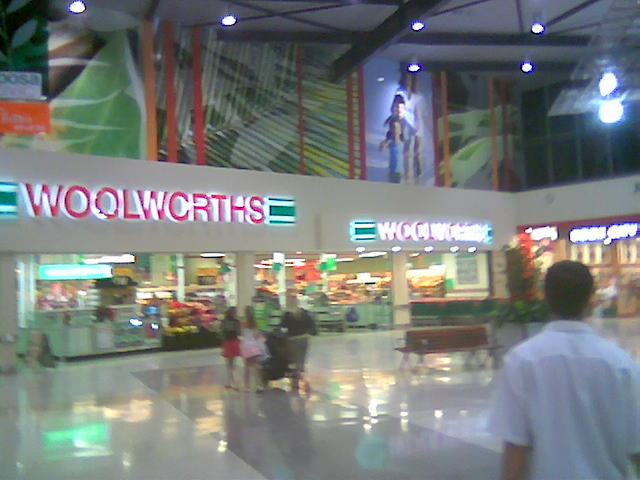
- Interactive map of the Noosa Civic area

General information
- Status: Open
- Location: 28 Eenie Creek Rd, Noosaville, Queensland
- Coordinates: 26.4152°S 153.0492°E
- Opened: 2006; 20 years ago
- Owner: Stockwell Property Group

Website
- Noosa Civic

Noosa Civic is a shopping centre located in Noosa on the Sunshine Coast, Queensland, Australia. Major stores include Woolworths and Big W and the centre includes over 8,000 square metres of specialty retail stores. The development commenced construction in 2005 and stage one, consisting of 30,000 square metres of retail and commercial development in four precincts was opened in October 2006.

Some controversy occurred to opponents of the development, complaining the development was approved on rare ecological wildlands and that a large-scale shopping centre detracted from what they claimed were Noosa's village-type ideals of local community. In its opening months, the marketing slogan used to promote the centre was "Bigger, Better, More", which some responded to negatively as a symbol of '80s-style greed, thus aggravated things considerably. After conducting market research, the developers changed to an inclusive slogan to "Where Noosa comes to shop... naturally", which they believed was more in keeping with Noosa's Biosphere reserve status and would potentially guide more locals to the centre, representing considerable reductions in greenhouse gas emissions due to less travel by car to more remote shopping locations.

In 2012, the centre's initial developer, Stockwell, sold to the Queensland Government owned Queensland Investment Corporation for a reported sale price of $200 million. Some hope Myer, Target and other tenants could support a further stage of development of the centre to serve the local community and tourists. Local politicians and anti-development activists opposed the expansion of the centre.

In 2015, Noosa Council rejected a development proposal to double the centre's size. This was upheld by the Planning and Environment Court.

== See also ==
- List of shopping centres in Australia
