= Sunshine Plaza =

- Location: Maroochydore, Queensland, Australia
- Coordinates: 26°39′16″S 153°05′18″E
- Opened: 22 November 1994; 31 years ago
- Developer: Lendlease
- Manager: Lendlease
- Owner: APPF Retail; GPT Group
- Num. of stores: 345
- Num. of anchor tenants: Myer, Kmart, Target, Woolworths, H&M, Coles Superstore, Birch Carroll & Coyle, David Jones and Big W
- Floor area: 107,000 m^{2} (1,150,000 sq ft)
- Floors: 2
- Parking: 5,000
- Website: www.sunshineplaza.com

Sunshine Plaza is a large regional shopping centre located in Maroochydore, Queensland, Australia and is the largest shopping centre on the Sunshine Coast. Anchor tenants included in the centre are Coles, Woolworths, Myer, Kmart, Target, Big W, H&M, David Jones, and a 12-screen Birch Carroll & Coyle cinema. The centre is currently managed by Lendlease.

== History ==
Previously operating under a different structure, the centre began trading in 1980 as The Sands Shopping Centre. The Lendlease purchased the centre in 1990 and began redevelopment of the site. The new centre began trading in 1994 under the new name Sunshine Plaza. It contains approximately 62,000 square metres of floor space; increased by recent expansions in the early 2000s. An expansion completed in 2002 included the addition of a Woolworths supermarket, a new leisure and restaurant precinct, and the expansion of the Birch Carroll & Coyle cinema complex.

In early 1999 it was announced that the Westfield Group would take a 25 percent stake in Sunshine plaza feet with clearance from the Australian Competition & Consumer Commission. The General Property Trust wanted to sell its stake, but joint owners Lendlease (through APPF Retail) had argued that they had exercised their pre-emptive rights over the centre, which gave them the rights to buy any part that GPT wants to sell before anyone else could buy it.

In September 2016, a $400 million makeover commenced. The proposed plan continued west along Cornmeal Creek and included introducing department store David Jones into a two-storey site. On top of this there would be a further 1,400 car spaces, 100 more specialty retail and restaurant spaces and an expansion of the Myer department store. It was scheduled for completion by the end of 2018.

In March 2019, the $440 million redevelopment opened to the public, including a one-level David Jones store, a two-level H&M, and a new concept Big W store. The redevelopment increased the total number of stores from 276 to 345, and increased the total number of parking spaces to nearly 5,000.

A high ropes attraction, the largest in Australia, opened in November 2020.

== Tenants ==
Sunshine Plaza contains 107,000 sqm of total floor space, and has 345 stores post redevelopment. Major retailers are Coles, Woolworths, Myer, Kmart, Target, Big W, David Jones, H&M, JB Hi-Fi, Mecca, Sephora, and Rebel. The plaza also has a 12-screen Birch Carroll & Coyle cinema.

In November 2026, after entering into administration, David Jones announced that it will close its store by the end of 2026.
