= Sunshine Beach State High School =

Location
- 45 Ben Lexcen Drive; Sunshine Beach, Queensland; Australia; 26.41°S 153.1°E

Information
- Type: Public, secondary
- Motto: Quality in all we do
- Established: 1992
- Principal: Anthony Swan
- Grades: 7–12
- Enrolment: 1588 (2023)
- Colours: Blue and green
- Website: https://sunshinebeachhigh.eq.edu.au/

Sunshine Beach State High School is a coeducational independent public secondary school based in Sunshine Beach in the local government area of the Shire of Noosa on the Sunshine Coast in Queensland, Australia.

Sunshine Beach State High School's current role of Principal is held by Anthony Swan. The school also consists of four Deputy Principals, one Business Services Manager, thirteen Heads of Department (one of which also holds one of the Deputy Principal roles), six Heads of Year, two Guidance Officers and one School-based Health Nurse.

== Extracurricular activities ==
Extracurricular activities available to students at Sunshine Beach State High School include:

- Cheerleading program
- Duke of Edinburgh Award
- English activities
  - Debating
  - Literary Festivals
  - Public speaking competitions
  - Spelling bees
  - Writing competitions
  - Writing workshops
- Sports activities
  - Carnivals
  - Excellence in Surfing
  - Touch Football
  - Triathlon
  - Water Polo
- Music Programs
  - Classroom Music Program
  - Performance Music Program
  - Years 7, 8 and 9 Music Excellence class
