= Tewantin =

- Town
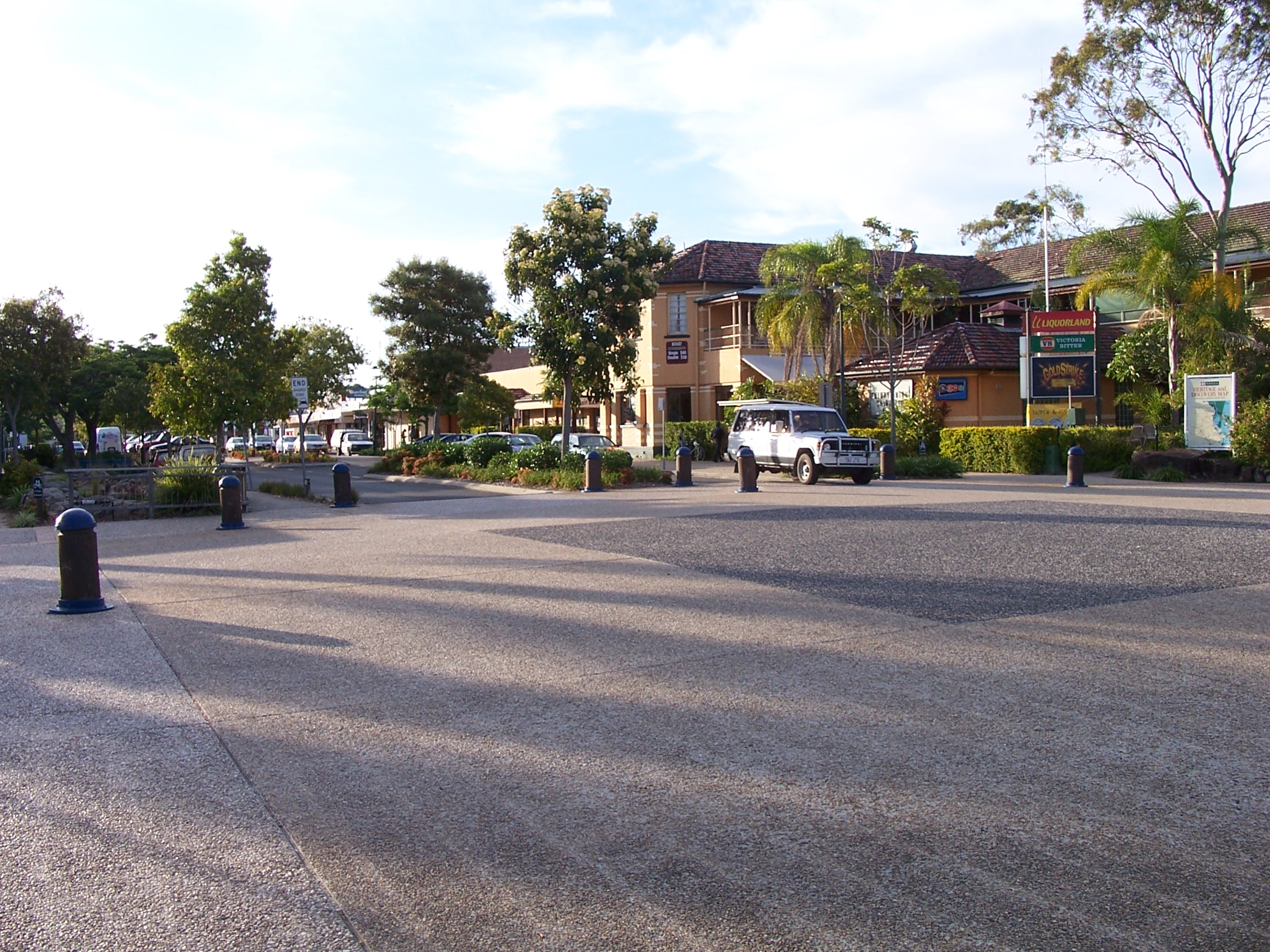

- Interactive map of Tewantin
- Coordinates: 26.3916°S 153.0386°E
- Country: Australia
- State: Queensland
- LGA: Shire of Noosa
- Location: 10.4 km (6.5 mi) W of Sunshine Beach; 13.0 km (8.1 mi) E of Cooroy; 25.7 km (16.0 mi) ESE of Pomona; 37.5 km (23.3 mi) N of Maroochydore; 148 km (92 mi) N of Brisbane
- Established: 1871

Government
  - State electorate: Noosa
  - Federal division: Wide Bay

Area
  - Total: 26.2 km^{2} (10.1 sq mi)

Population
  - Total: 11,164 (2021 census)
  - Density: 426.1/km^{2} (1,103.6/sq mi)
- Time zone: UTC+10:00 (AEST)
- Postcode: 4565
Localities around Tewantin
Cooroibah	Cooroibah	Noosa North Shore
Tinbeerwah	Tewantin	Noosaville
Tinbeerwah	Doonan	Noosaville

Tewantin (/təˈwɒntən/ tə-WON-tən) is a town and locality in the Shire of Noosa, Queensland, Australia. Tewantin was the original settlement in the Noosa region and is one of its three major centres today. In the 2021 census, the locality of Tewantin had a population of 11,164 people.

== Geography ==
The locality is bounded to the north by Lake Cooroibah and to the east by the Noosa River which flows into the lake.

Most of the locality is within protected areas with the Great Sandy National Park in the north of the locality, Tewantin National Park in the north-west, west, south-west, and south of the locality, with the Harry Springs Conservation Park in the centre of the locality. The town is in the east of the locality with Doonella Lake in the south-east.

The Cooroy–Noosa Road enters from the west (Tinbeerwah) and terminates in the town.

== History ==
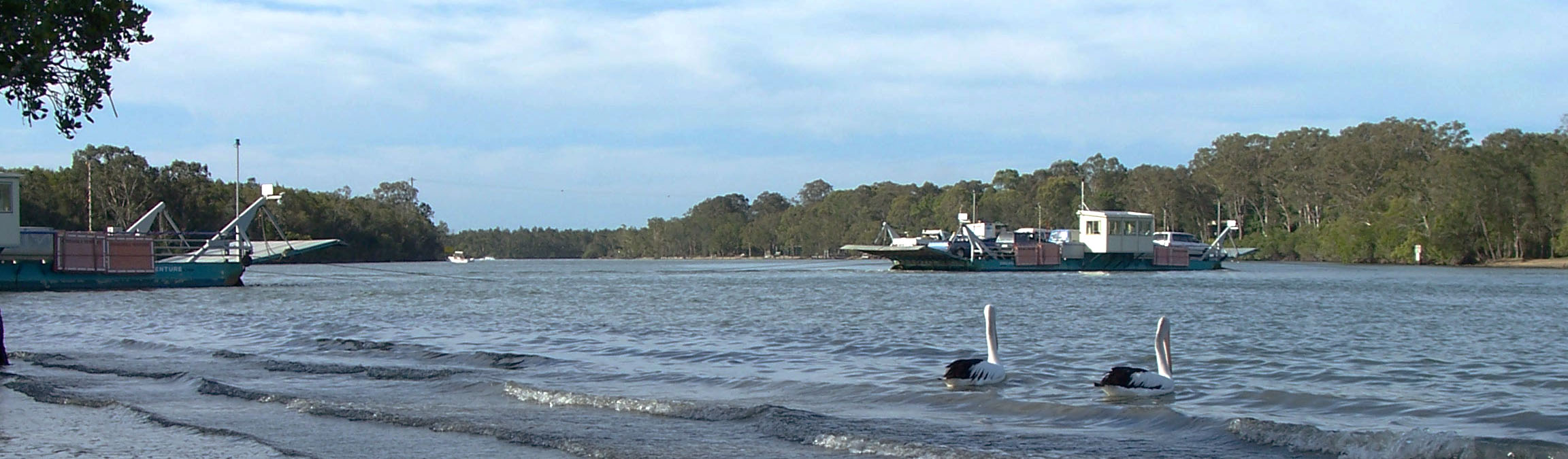
The Tewantin–Noosa North Shore ferries and two pelicans, 2006.

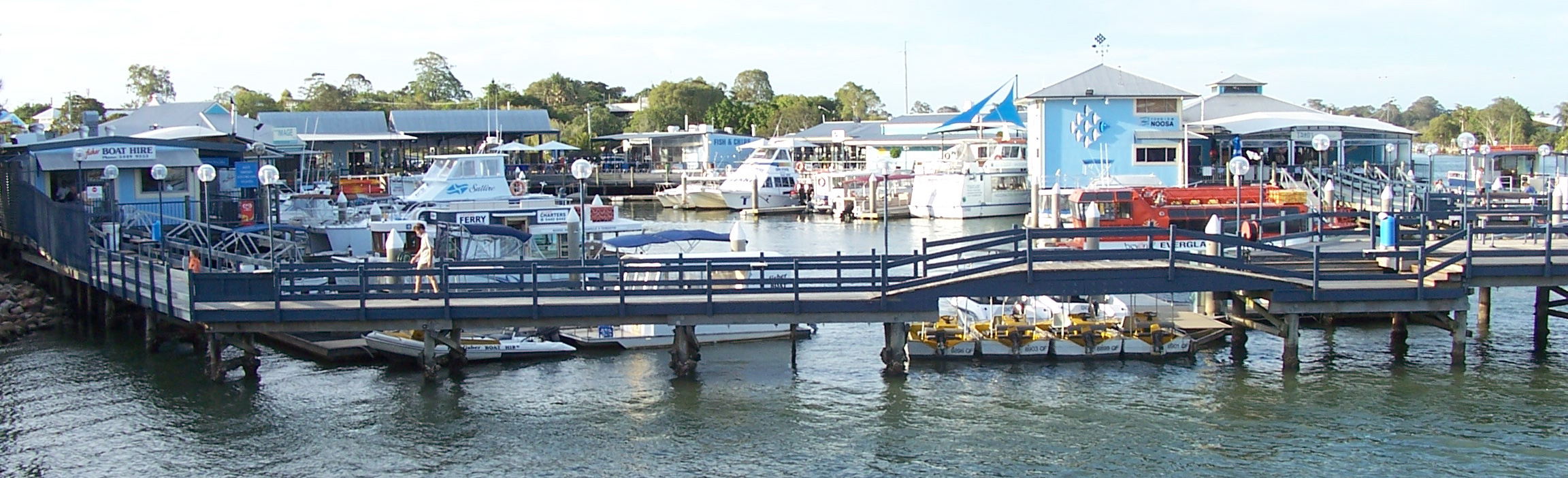
Noosa Harbour, Tewantin, 2006

The name Tewantin is an anglicised version of the Aboriginal name for the area, dauwadhum, meaning place of dead logs, because of the sawmill there.

Tewantin was originally a timber town. In 1869, Tewantin was the river port for the Noosa area. In 1871, Clarendon Stuart surveyed a town site for the Tewantin settlement. Tewantin was a thriving small town with a reliance on the gold, fishing and timber industries.

Tewantin Provisional School opened on 2 August 1875. On 25 April 1887, it became Tewantin State School.

On 1 April 1910, Dr Henry Youngman officiated at the opening of the Tewantin Methodist Church.

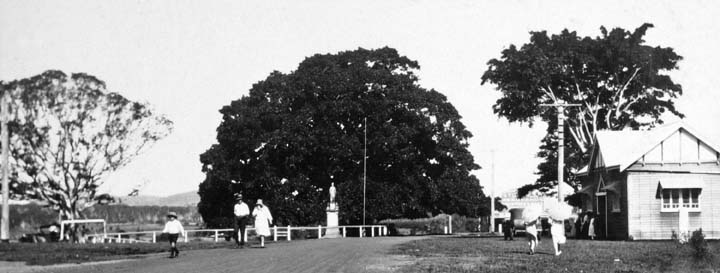
Tewantin War Memorial, Town Square, circa 1931

The Tewantin War Memorial commemorates those from the district who served in World War I. It was dedicated in January–February 1922 by Colonel David Elder Reid.

Tewantin replaced Pomona on 1 December 1985 as the location of the Noosa Shire Council until 15 March 2008 when the council was amalgamated with Maroochy Shire and the City of Caloundra to create the Sunshine Coast Region. In 2014, the Shire of Noosa was re-established having deamalgamated from the Sunshine Coast Region.

Noosa Flexible Learning Centre opened on 23 January 2006.

== Demographics ==
In the 2016 census, the locality of Tewantin had a population of 10,920 people.

In the 2021 census, the locality of Tewantin had a population of 11,164 people.

== Climate ==
Tewantin experiences a humid subtropical climate (Köppen: Cfa, Trewartha: Cfal), with hot, muggy summers and mild winters. Precipitation is abundant, averaging 1597.2 mm annually, with a late summer maximum.

Climate data for Tewantin (26º23'24"S, 153º02'24"E, 6 m AMSL) (1996–2024 normals, extremes 1895–2024)
Month	Jan	Feb	Mar	Apr	May	Jun	Jul	Aug	Sep	Oct	Nov	Dec	Year
Record high °C (°F)	44.2 (111.6)	39.7 (103.5)	37.7 (99.9)	34.4 (93.9)	31.7 (89.1)	28.9 (84.0)	30.4 (86.7)	33.9 (93.0)	35.4 (95.7)	40.0 (104.0)	40.5 (104.9)	39.7 (103.5)	44.2 (111.6)
Mean daily maximum °C (°F)	28.7 (83.7)	28.6 (83.5)	27.7 (81.9)	25.9 (78.6)	23.7 (74.7)	21.7 (71.1)	21.3 (70.3)	22.4 (72.3)	24.3 (75.7)	25.7 (78.3)	26.8 (80.2)	28.2 (82.8)	25.4 (77.8)
Mean daily minimum °C (°F)	22.0 (71.6)	22.0 (71.6)	20.9 (69.6)	18.1 (64.6)	14.8 (58.6)	12.6 (54.7)	11.3 (52.3)	11.7 (53.1)	14.5 (58.1)	17.0 (62.6)	18.9 (66.0)	20.8 (69.4)	17.1 (62.7)
Record low °C (°F)	12.2 (54.0)	8.9 (48.0)	8.4 (47.1)	4.4 (39.9)	1.0 (33.8)	−2.8 (27.0)	−2.2 (28.0)	−1.1 (30.0)	−0.2 (31.6)	2.5 (36.5)	7.1 (44.8)	9.4 (48.9)	−2.8 (27.0)
Average precipitation mm (inches)	151.8 (5.98)	236.4 (9.31)	227.8 (8.97)	149.4 (5.88)	158.1 (6.22)	114.8 (4.52)	73.0 (2.87)	73.5 (2.89)	58.6 (2.31)	116.3 (4.58)	90.7 (3.57)	142.4 (5.61)	1,597.2 (62.88)
Average precipitation days (≥ 1.0 mm)	10.7	12.5	14.2	11.6	10.3	8.8	7.3	5.3	5.9	7.9	7.5	9.8	111.8
Average afternoon relative humidity (%)	67	67	66	64	62	61	57	56	59	63	65	66	63
Average dew point °C (°F)	20.1 (68.2)	20.1 (68.2)	18.7 (65.7)	16.7 (62.1)	13.8 (56.8)	11.8 (53.2)	10.3 (50.5)	10.7 (51.3)	13.5 (56.3)	15.7 (60.3)	17.1 (62.8)	19.1 (66.4)	15.6 (60.2)
Source: Bureau of Meteorology (1996–2024 normals, extremes 1895–2024)

== Education ==
Tewantin State School is a government primary (Prep–6) school for boys and girls at Werin Street (26.3901°S 153.0325°E). It includes a special education program. In 2017, the school had an enrolment of 603 students with 43 teachers (36 full-time equivalent) and 26 non-teaching staff (19 full-time equivalent).

There are no secondary schools in Tewantin. The nearest government secondary schools are Sunshine Beach State High School in Sunshine Beach to the east and Noosa District State High School which has its junior campus in Pomona to the north-west and its senior campus in Cooroy to the west.

== Community groups ==
The Tewantin Noosa branch of the Queensland Country Women's Association meets at the CWA Hall in Pacific Avenue.

== Facilities ==
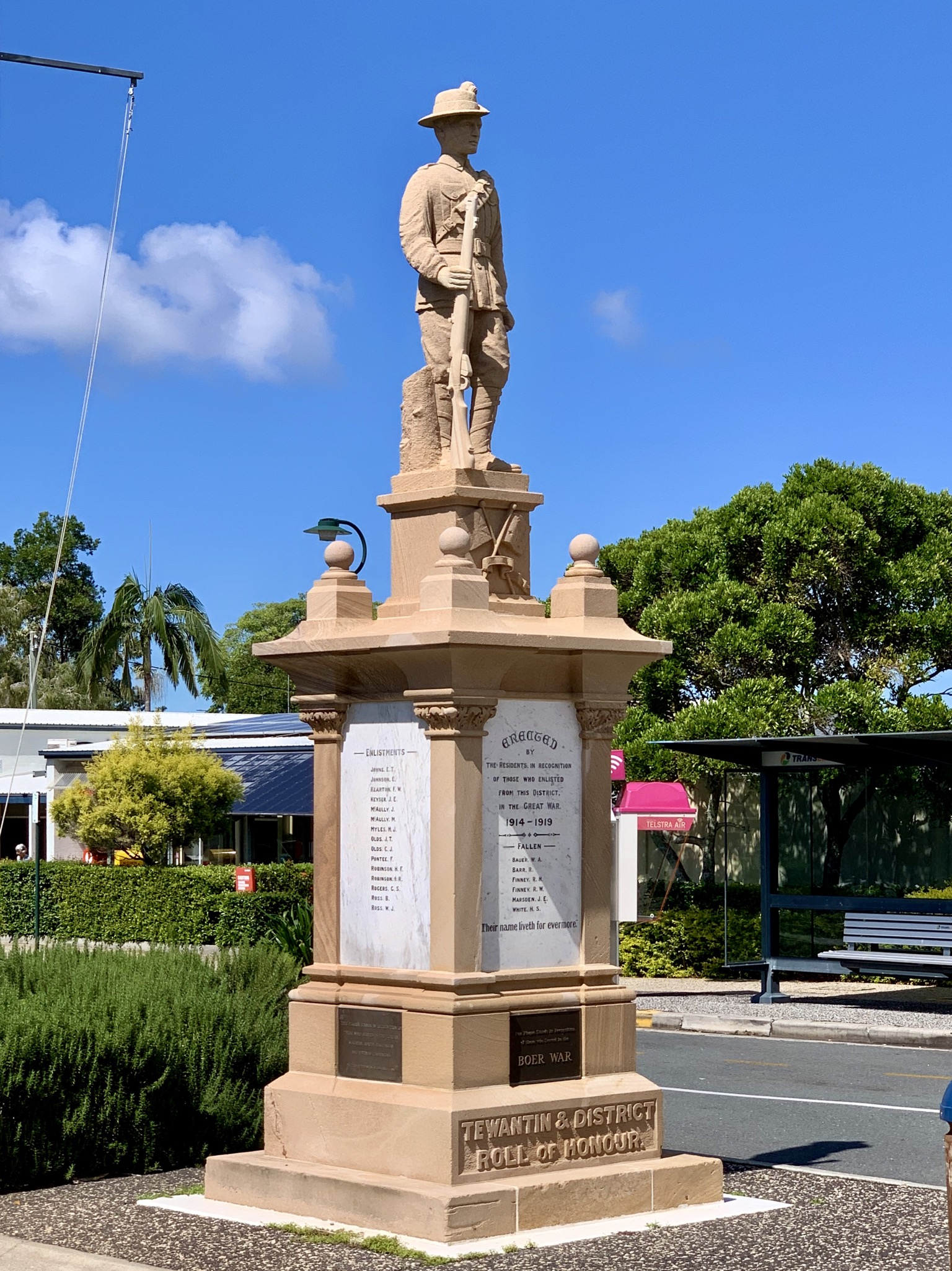
Tewantin War Memorial

Its main street, Poinciana Avenue, leads to the Tewantin RSL, which holds a strong legacy towards the Australia's history in war. Poinciana Avenue has a historic pub, the Royal Mail, War Memorial, and a range of shops, restaurants and a town square.

== Events ==
There is an annual Anzac Day march through Tewantin. It is led by the staff and students of Tewantin State School.

== See also ==
- Noosa River Ferry
