= Noosaville =

- Town
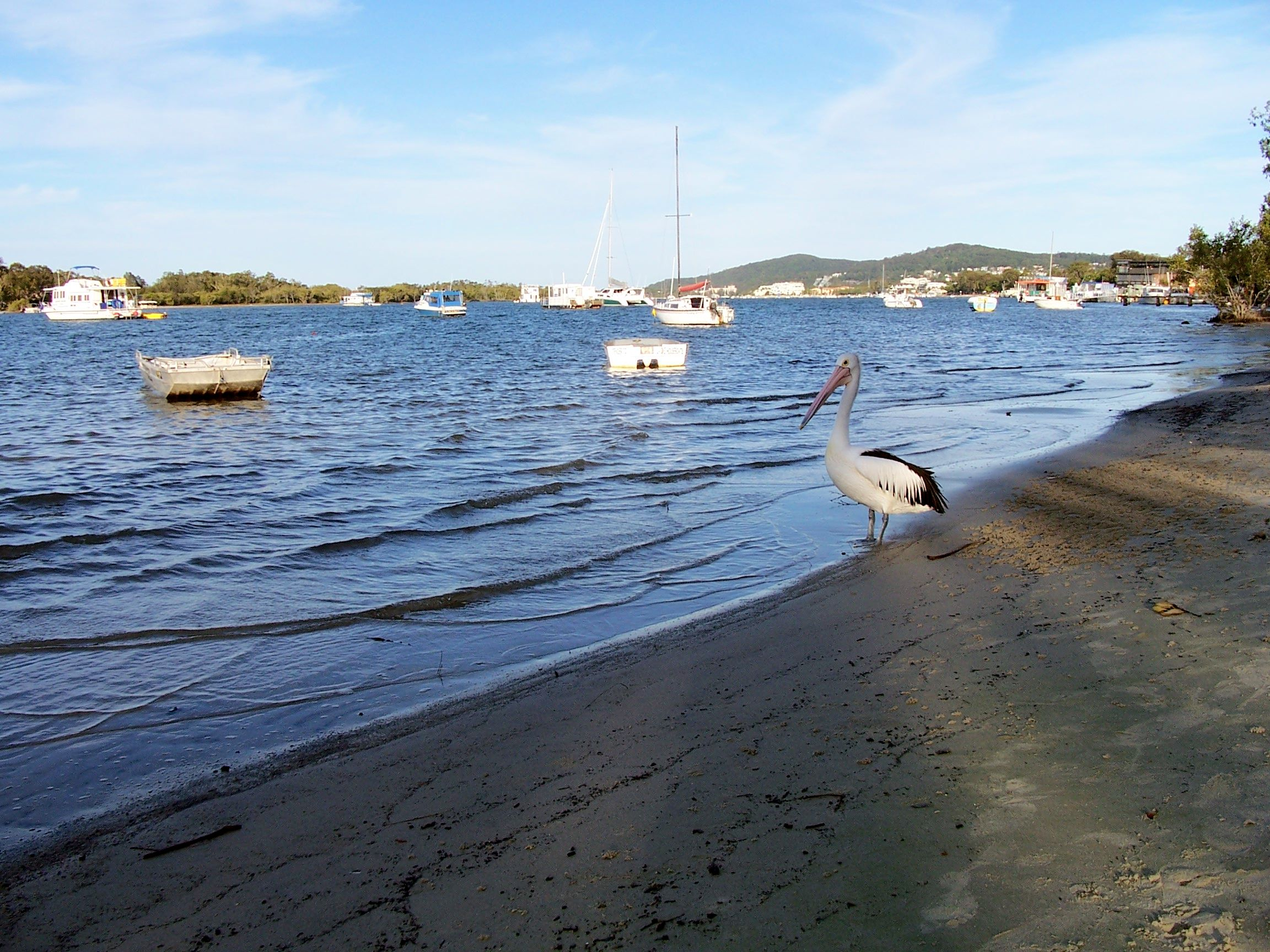
- A pelican on Noosa River, Noosaville

- Interactive map of Noosaville
- Coordinates: 26.3980°S 153.0616°E
- Country: Australia
- State: Queensland
- City: Noosa
- LGA: Shire of Noosa
- Location: 3.6 km (2.2 mi) SE of Tewantin; 6.5 km (4.0 mi) WSW of Noosa Heads; 133 km (83 mi) N of Brisbane; 61 km (38 mi) SE of Gympie

Government
  - State electorate: Noosa
  - Federal division: Wide Bay

Area
  - Total: 25.8 km^{2} (10.0 sq mi)
- Elevation: 6 m (20 ft)

Population
  - Total: 8,716 (2021 census)
  - Density: 337.8/km^{2} (875.0/sq mi)
- Time zone: UTC+10:00 (AEST)
- Postcode: 4566
Localities around Noosaville
| Tewantin | Noosa North Shore | Noosa Heads |
| Doonan | Noosaville | Castaways Beach |
| Weyba Downs | Peregian Beach | Marcus Beach |

Noosaville is a town and suburb in Noosa in the Shire of Noosa, Queensland, Australia. In the 2021 census, the suburb of Noosaville had a population of 8,716 people.

== Geography ==
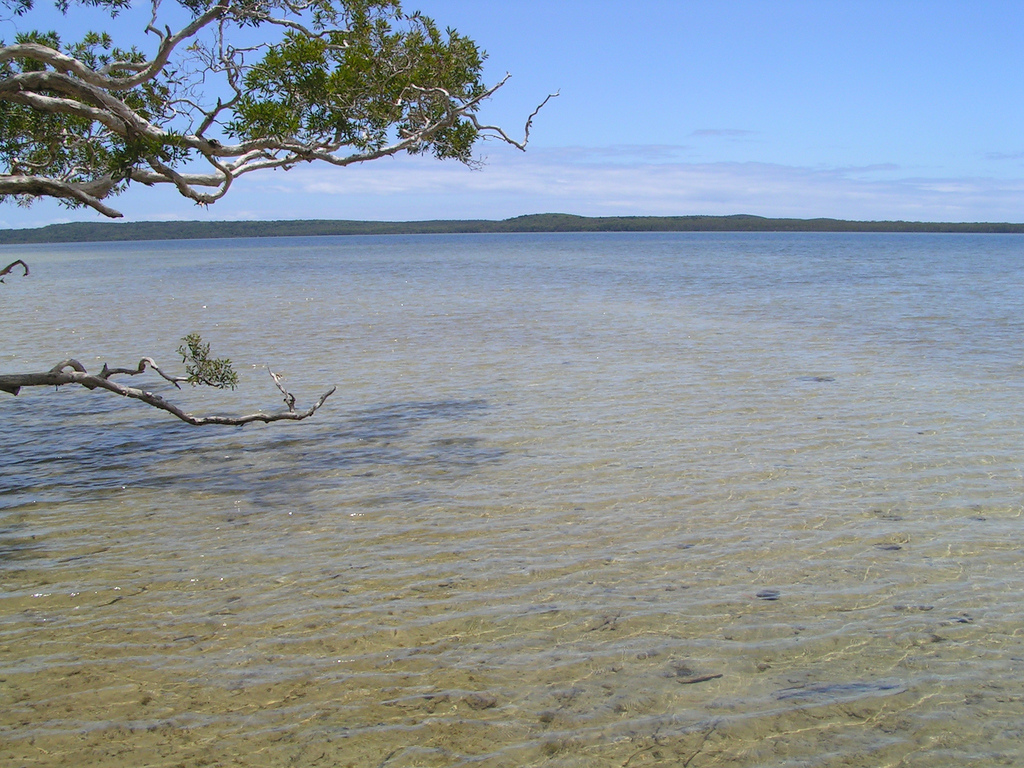
Lake Weyba

Noosaville is bounded by the Noosa River to the north, Weyba Creek to the east, the shoreline of Lake Weyba (the lake being within the suburb).

Lake Weyba is in the south-east of the suburb (26.4392°S 153.0742°E) and is 9.77 square kilometres (3.77 sq mi). Weyba is believed to mean place of stingrays or place of flying squirrels.

The land in the north of the locality near the river is predominantly residential including the Noosa Waters canal estate (26.4052°S 153.0597°E).

The southern part of the suburb including Lake Webya is undeveloped, apart from Noosa Aerodrome (26.4246°S 153.0679°E), the only commercial airstrip in the Shire of Noosa.

In the west of the suburb there is a mix of residential areas and industrial areas, including the Noosa Civic (26.4152°S 153.0492°E), a major shopping centre which serves the Noosa community.

The Eumundi-Noosa Road runs through from west to east.

== History ==
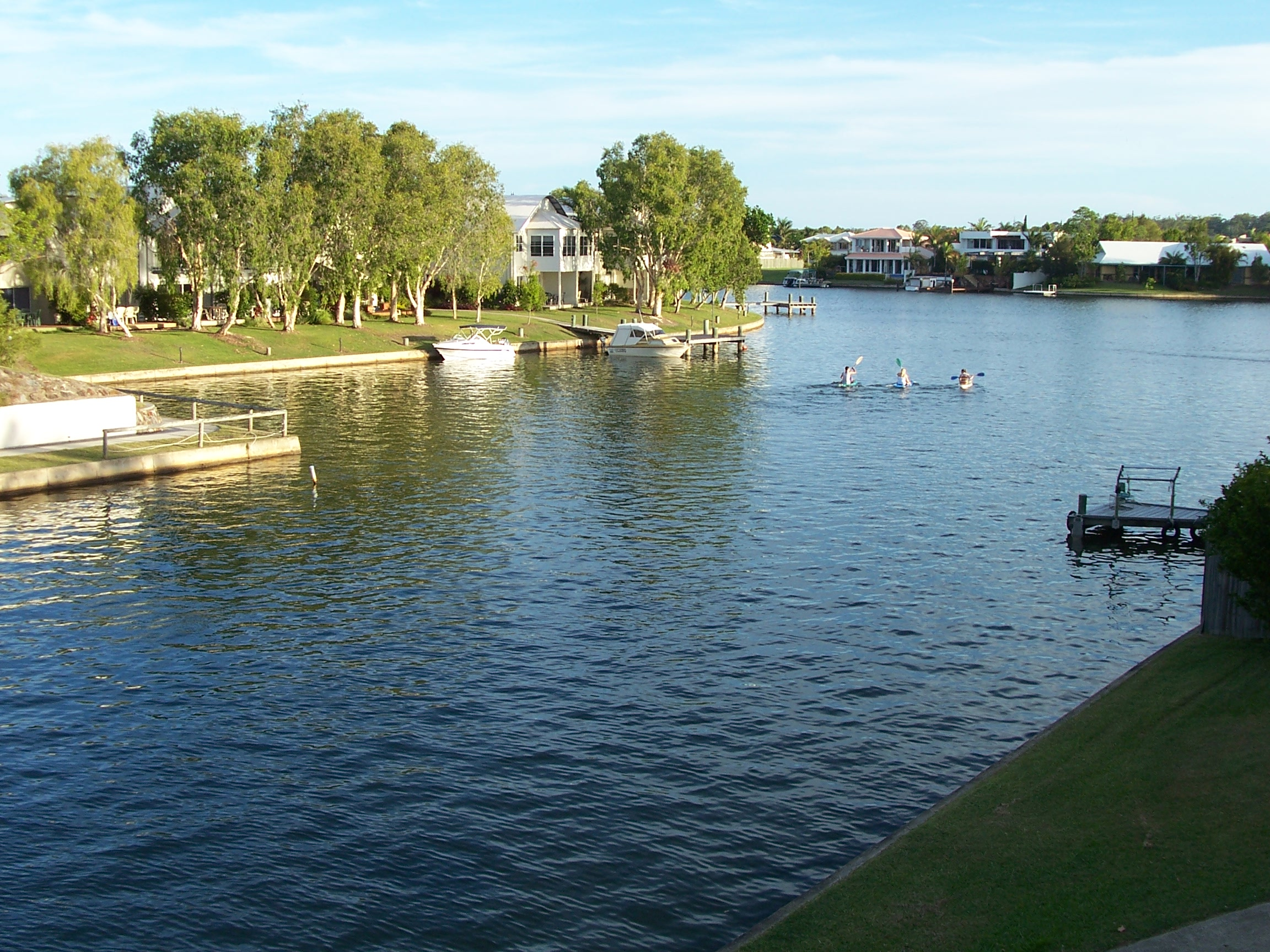
Noosa Waters, Noosaville.

The name Noosa comes from the headland Noosa Head, which is a corruption of a Kabi word nuthuru meaning ghost or shadow.

Noosa Waters canal estate was developed by the Hooker Corporation in the 1980s.

In December 1950 St James' Anglican Church Hall was dedicated by the Reverend Ernest Read Chittenden, the Rural Dean of Wide Bay. It closed circa 1986.

Good Shepherd Lutheran College opened on 28 January 1986.

The Noosaville Public Library building opened in 1993.

Noosaville State School opened on 29 January 1996.

St Teresa's Catholic College opened on 26 January 2004.

Although historically and currently within the Shire of Noosa, between 2008 and 2013 the Shire of Noosa was abolished and Noosaville was within Sunshine Coast Region.

== Demographics ==
In the 2016 census, the suburb of Noosaville had a population of 8,124 people.

In the 2021 census, the suburb of Noosaville had a population of 8,716 people.

== Heritage listings ==
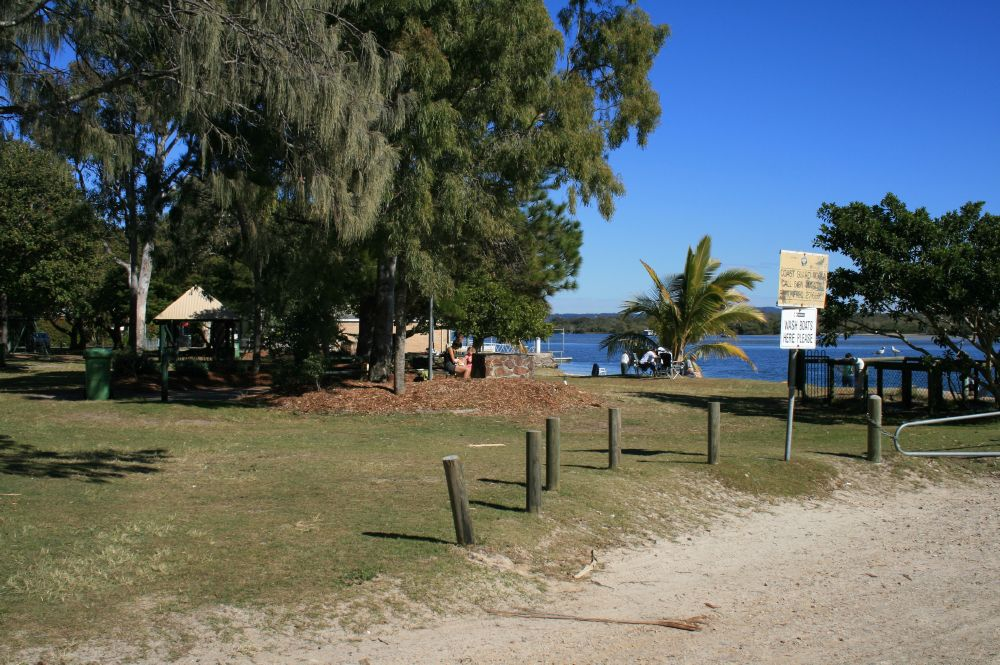
Noosa River Caravan Park, 2007

Noosaville has a number of heritage-listed sites, including:

- Noosa River Caravan Park, Russell Street (26.3945°S 153.0739°E)

== Amenities ==
The Noosa Shire Council has a library located at 7 Wallace Drive, Wallace Park (26.4012°S 153.0501°E).

== Education ==
Noosaville State School is a government primary (Early Childhood to Year 6) school for boys and girls at 75 Beckmans Road (26.4095°S 153.0291°E). In 2017, the school had an enrolment of 487 students with 41 teachers (33 full-time equivalent) and 23 non-teaching staff (17 full-time equivalent). It includes a special education program.

Good Shepherd Lutheran College is a private primary and secondary (Prep–12) school for boys and girls at 115 Eumundi Road (26.4085°S 153.0493°E). In 2017, the school had an enrolment of 1,006 students with 68 teachers (63 full-time equivalent) and 76 non-teaching staff (51 full-time equivalent).

St Teresa's Catholic College is a Catholic secondary (7–12) school for boys and girls on Sea Eagle Drive (26.4064°S 153.0323°E). In 2017, the school had an enrolment of 877 students with 67 teachers (64 full-time equivalent) and 38 non-teaching staff (30 full-time equivalent).

There are no government secondary schools in Noosaville. The nearest government secondary school is Sunshine Beach State High School in Sunshine Beach.

== Attractions ==
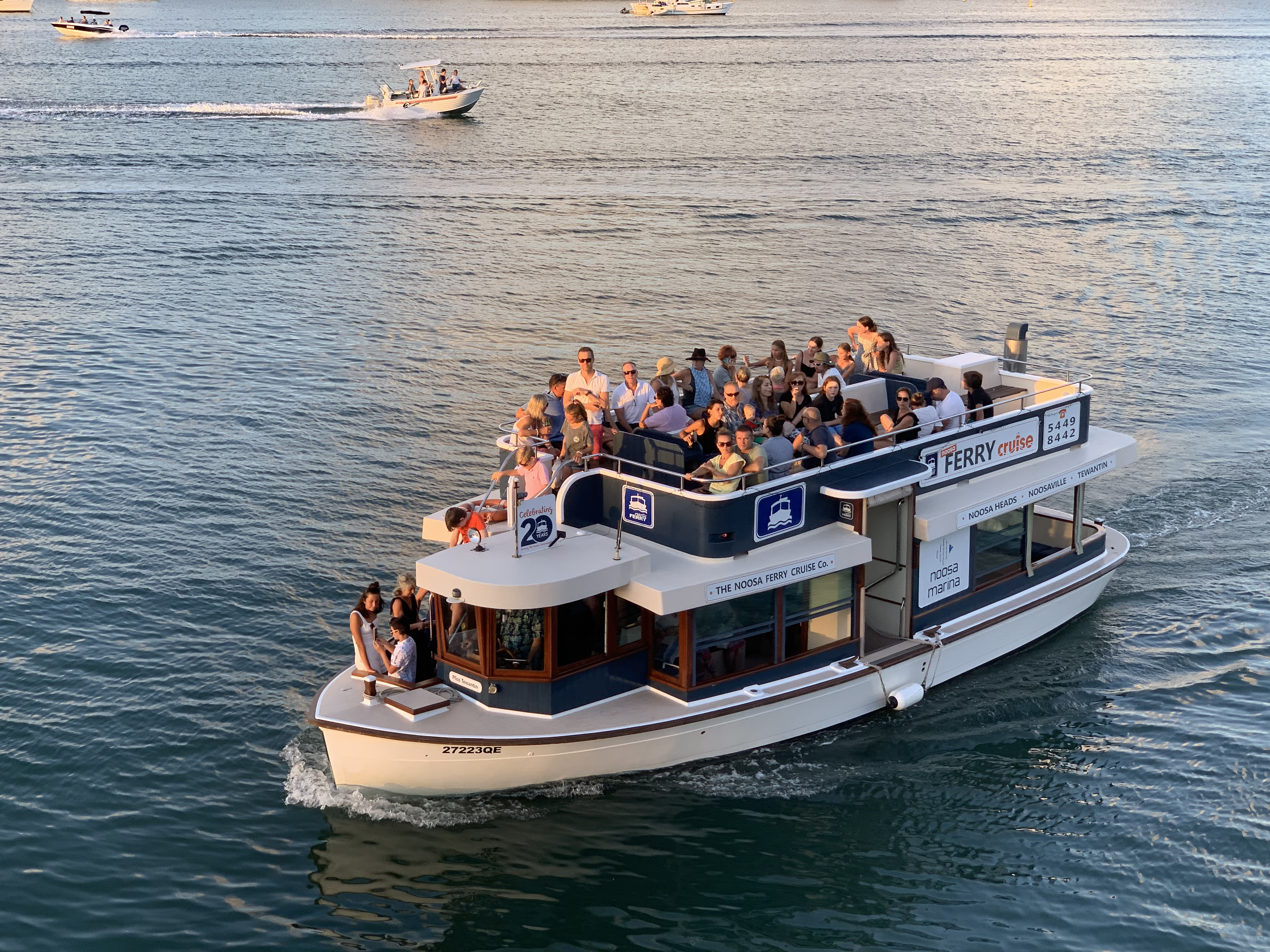
Noosa Ferry on Noosa River approaching Noosaville, 2019

A ferry service operates along the Noosa River from Noosa Heads via Noosaville to Tewantin with timetabled regular services and tourist cruises.
