= Shire of Maroochy =

Coordinates: 26°37′50″S 152°57′32.9″E

- Local government area
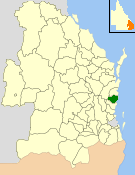
- Location within Queensland

- Country: Australia
- State: Queensland
- Region: Sunshine Coast
- Established: 1890
- Council seat: Nambour

Area
  - Total: 1,162.7 km^{2} (448.9 sq mi)

Population
  - Total: 151,599 (2006 census)
  - Density: 130.385/km^{2} (337.696/sq mi)
- Website: Shire of Maroochy
LGAs around Shire of Maroochy
Cooloola	Noosa	Pacific Ocean
Cooloola	Shire of Maroochy	Pacific Ocean
Kilcoy	Caloundra	Pacific Ocean

The Shire of Maroochy was a local government area about 100 kilometres (62 mi) north of Brisbane in the Sunshine Coast region of South East Queensland, Australia. The shire covered an area of 1,162.7 square kilometres (448.9 sq mi), and existed as a local government entity from 1890 until 2008, when it amalgamated with its neighbours to the north and south to form the Sunshine Coast Region.

== History ==
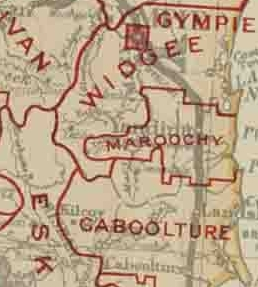
Map of Maroochy Division and adjacent local government areas, March 1902

In 1842, Andrew Petrie explored the coast north of Brisbane and discovered the Mary River with a small party including two Aboriginal men from the Brisbane River region who spoke the Yuggera language. Their name for the local black swan was "Muru-kutchi" or "red-bill". Petrie hence named the area Maroochy.

The area was originally incorporated as part of the Caboolture Divisional Board on 11 November 1879 under the Divisional Boards Act 1879. On 5 July 1890, Maroochy split away and was proclaimed as a Maroochy Division in its own right, with an area of 1,265 square kilometres (488 sq mi) and headquarters at Nambour. It did not initially contain Buderim or Kenilworth. The first elections were held on 13 September for three councillors, each of whom represented one subdivision. By 1895, council chambers had been erected firstly on Blackall Terrace and then at Station Square adjacent to the Nambour railway station, where they were to continue meeting until 1978.

With the passage of the Local Authorities Act 1902, Maroochy became a shire council on 31 March 1903. The first land sale in Maroochydore in 1908 allowed 8.1 square kilometres (2,002 acres) along the coast to be opened up, allowing for the development of the towns of Alexandra Headland and Mooloolaba. The council commenced supplying electricity in 1927, and a hospital was opened in 1930. With the start of major development in South East Queensland in the late 1950s, Maroochy Airport (now Sunshine Coast Airport, the major regional facility) was opened in 1961. The Shire grew rapidly from this point onwards.

Fires were a persistent problem in the hinterland region, and on Anzac Day in 1948, a fire significantly damaged the Shire Chambers. In 1978, the Shire moved its offices to a new location in Bury Street, Nambour, with the old facility in Civic Square remaining as a civic hall. On 15 August 1986 a fire damaged this beyond repair—it was bulldozed three years later to make way for the new Centenary Square development.

In 2000, Queensland police arrested a man for using a computer and a radio transmitter to take control of the Maroochy Shire wastewater system and release sewage into parks, rivers and property.

On 15 March 2008, under the Local Government (Reform Implementation) Act 2007 passed by the Parliament of Queensland on 10 August 2007, the Shire of Maroochy merged with the Shire of Noosa and the City of Caloundra to form the Sunshine Coast Region.

== Structure ==
The Shire was subdivided into 12 numbered divisions, each of which returned one councillor, and an elected mayor.

== Towns and localities ==
The Shire of Maroochy included the following settlements:

- Alexandra Headland
- Belli Park
- Bli Bli
- Bridges
- Buderim
- Burnside
- Chevallum
- Coes Creek
- Coolabine
- Cooloolabin
- Coolum Beach
- Cotton Tree
- Diddillibah
- Doonan^{1}
- Dulong
- Eerwah Vale^{1}
- Eudlo
- Eumundi
- Flaxton
- Forest Glen
- Gheerulla
- Highworth
- Hunchy
- Ilkley
- Image Flat
- Kenilworth
- Kiamba
- Kidaman Creek^{2}
- Kiels Mountain
- Kulangoor
- Kuluin
- Kunda Park
- Kureelpa
- Landers Shoot
- Mapleton
- Marcoola
- Maroochy River
- Maroochydore
- Mons
- Montville
- Mooloolaba
- Mount Coolum
- Mountain Creek
- Mudjimba
- Nambour
- Ninderry
- North Arm
- Obi Obi
- Pacific Paradise
- Palmwoods
- Parklands
- Peregian Beach^{1}
- Peregian Springs
- Perwillowen
- Point Arkwright
- Rosemount
- Sippy Downs
- Tanawha
- Towen Mountain
- Twin Waters
- Valdora
- Verrierdale
- West Woombye
- Weyba Downs
- Woombye
- Yandina Creek
- Yandina
- Yaroomba

^{1} - split with the Shire of Noosa
^{2} - split with the City of Caloundra

== Population ==
Year	Population
1933	12,918
1947	15,014
1954	17,869
1961	19,071
1966	21,455
1971	25,522
1976	35,266
1981	53,428
1986	61,629
1991	84,442
1996	111,798
2001	129,429
2006	151,599

== Chairmen and mayors ==
- 1927: J. T. Lowe
- 1952–1967: David Low
- 1967–1982: Eddie De Vere
- 1982–1985: Don Culley
- 1985–1994: Fred Murray
- 1994–1997: Bob King
- 1997–2000: Don Culley
- 2000–2004: Alison Grosse
- 2004–2008: Joe Natoli

== Sister cities ==
- Tatebayashi, Japan
- Xiamen, China

== See also ==
- List of tramways in Queensland
