= Blackall Range road network =

Roads in Queensland, Australia

Blackall Range road network is a group of roads that provide access to the mountain localities and towns from various lowland places, and enable travel between the mountain communities. The network ensures continuity of access in times of flooding or other natural disasters, and during planned maintenance activities. The area serviced by the network includes the localities and towns, from south to north, of Maleny, Montville and Mapleton. It also includes the rural localities of Bald Knob, Balmoral Ridge, Flaxton, Gheerulla, North Maleny, Obi Obi and Witta. The area hosts a substantial residential community plus many tourism accommodation venues. At the 2021 census, the locality of Maleny had a population of 3,959 people.

Located to the west of the Sunshine Coast in Queensland, Australia, the Blackall Range is also a popular day-trip destination.

== Roads in the network ==
The network consists of the following state-controlled roads:

- Landsborough–Maleny Road
- Maleny–Kenilworth Road
- Maleny–Montville Road
- Maleny–Stanley River Road
- Montville–Mapleton Road
- Nambour–Mapleton Road
- Obi Obi Road
- Woombye–Montville Road
- Palmwoods–Mooloolah Road

A number of local roads that also access the range are not included in this article.

== Landsborough–Maleny Road ==
Landsborough–Maleny Road
- Location: Glass House Mountains Road, Landsborough to Maleny–Kenilworth Road, Maleny
- Length: 15.2 km (9.4 mi)
- Route number: 23

Landsborough–Maleny Road is a state-controlled district road (number 494). It carries traffic from Landsborough on the Glass House Mountains Road, via Bald Knob, to Maleny, a distance of 15.2 kilometres (9.4 mi). Almost all of this road is part of Tourist Drive 23.

The road runs generally north-west from Landsborough, ascending the south-eastern slope of the Blackall Range. It climbs from a lowest point of 37 metres (121 ft) to a highest point of 446 metres (1,463 ft). About 2.8 kilometres (1.7 mi) is steeper than 5%, of which 860 metres (2,820 ft) is between 10% and 15%, and 330 metres (1,080 ft) is greater than 15%.

=== Major intersections (Landsborough-Maleny Road) ===
All distances are from Google Maps. The entire road is within the Sunshine Coast local government area.

Location	km	mi	Destinations	Notes
Landsborough	0	0.0	Glass House Mountains Road – north – Glenview – south – Beerwah	South-eastern end of Landsborough–Maleny Road (Tourist Drive 23). The road starts as Railway Street, and becomes Maleny Street as it crosses the railway line.
Landsborough	1.1	0.68	Old Gympie Road – north (as Gympie Street North) - Mooloolah Valley: south (as Gympie Street South) – Beerwah	Road continues north-west as Maleny Street.
Landsborough	1.4	0.87	Maleny Street – north – Landsborough	Road continues north-west as Landsborough–Maleny Road.
Landsborough / Mount Mellum midpoint	4.2	2.6	Mount Mellum Road – south – Mount Mellum	Road continues west.
Bald Knob	5.7	3.5	Bald Knob Road – south-west – Peachester	Road continues north-west.
Bald Knob / Maleny / midpoint	9.5	5.9	Mountain View Road – south-west – Maleny	Road continues north-west with no route number.
Balmoral Ridge / Maleny midpoint	10.8	6.7	Maleny–Montville Road – north – Montville	Road continues west as Landsborough–Maleny Road (Tourist Drive 23).
Maleny	14.4	8.9	Bunya Street – south – Maleny	Road continues north-west as Bunya Street.
Maleny	14.8	9.2	Coral Street – south-west – Maleny	Road continues north-west as Maple Street.
Maleny	15.2	9.4	Maleny–Stanley River Road (Myrtle Street) – south-west – Peachester	North-western end of Landsborough–Maleny Road (Tourist Drive 23) Road continues north-west as Maleny–Kenilworth Road (Beech Street) (Tourist Drive 22)
1.000 mi = 1.609 km; 1.000 km = 0.621 mi: Route transition

== Maleny–Kenilworth Road ==
Maleny–Kenilworth Road
- Location: Landsborough–Maleny Road, Maleny to Eumundi–Kenilworth Road, Kenilworth
- Length: 40.7 km (25.3 mi)
- Route number: 22

Maleny–Kenilworth Road is a state-controlled district road (number 495). It runs from Maleny, via Witta, Elaman Creek, Conondale and Cambroon, to Kenilworth, a distance of 40.7 kilometres (25.3 mi). This road is part of Tourist Drive 22.

The road descends the south-western slope of the Blackall Range and then follows the Mary River valley north to Kenilworth. It descends from a highest point of 480 metres (1,570 ft) to a lowest point of 99 metres (325 ft). About 4.6 kilometres (2.9 mi) is steeper than 5%, of which 620 metres (2,030 ft) is between 10% and 15%, and 220 metres (720 ft) is greater than 15%.

A project to widen sections of the road in Conondale and Cambroon, at a cost of $4.9 million, was expected to complete late in 2022.

=== Major intersections (Maleny–Kenilworth Road) ===
All distances are from Google Maps. The entire road is within the Sunshine Coast local government area.

Location	km	mi	Destinations	Notes
Maleny	0	0.0	Maleny–Stanley River Road – south – Wootha; Landsborough–Maleny Road – east – Landsborough	South-eastern end of Maleny–Kenilworth Road (Tourist Drive 22). The road starts as Beech Street, then Cedar Street, and then becomes Macadamia Drive.
Maleny / Reesville midpoint	2.6	1.6	Reesville Road – south-west – Reesville	Road continues west, then north as Maleny–Kenilworth Road.
Kenilworth	40.7	25.3	Eumundi–Kenilworth Road – north-east – Eumundi	North-western end of Maleny–Kenilworth Road. Road continues north-west as Kenilworth–Brooloo Road (State Route 51).
1.000 mi = 1.609 km; 1.000 km = 0.621 mi: Route transition

== Maleny–Montville Road ==
Maleny–Montville Road
- Location: Landsborough–Maleny Road, Maleny to Montville–Mapleton Road, Montville
- Length: 9.9 km (6.2 mi)
- Route number: 23

Maleny–Montville Road is a state-controlled district road (number 497), rated as a local road of regional significance (LRRS) It runs from Maleny, via Balmoral Ridge, to Montville, a distance of 9.9 kilometres (6.2 mi). Within the locality of Montville this road is known as Balmoral Road. It is part of Tourist Drive 23. There are no major intersections on this road.

The road runs from south to north along the eastern edge of the Blackall Range. Its elevation varies from a highest point of 444 metres (1,457 ft) to a lowest point of 285 metres (935 ft). About 2.1 kilometres (1.3 mi) is steeper than 5%, of which 800 metres (2,600 ft) is between 10% and 15%, and 970 metres (3,180 ft) is greater than 15%.

== Maleny–Stanley River Road ==
Maleny–Stanley River Road
- Location: Maleny–Kenilworth Road, Maleny to Kilcoy–Beerwah Road, Peachester
- Length: 20.3 km (12.6 mi)
- Route number: 23

Maleny–Stanley River Road is a state-controlled district road (number 493) rated as a local road of regional significance (LRRS). It runs from the Maleny–Kenilworth Road in Maleny, via Wootha and Booroobin, to the Kilcoy–Beerwah Road in Peachester, a distance of 20.3 kilometres (12.6 mi). The first section of this road, within the locality of Maleny, is part of Tourist Drive 23.

The roads runs down a ridge to the south-west of Maleny, crosses the headwaters of the Stanley River, then turns south-east and ascends a ridge of the Conondale Range to Peachester. Its elevation varies from a highest point of 564 metres (1,850 ft) to a lowest point of 290 metres (950 ft). About 6 kilometres (3.7 mi) is steeper than 5%, of which 1.3 kilometres (0.81 mi) is between 10% and 15%, and 390 metres (1,280 ft) is greater than 15%.

=== Major intersections (Maleny–Stanley River Road) ===
All distances are from Google Maps. The entire road is within the Sunshine Coast local government area.

Location	km	mi	Destinations	Notes
Maleny	0	0.0	Landsborough–Maleny Road – east – Landsborough; Maleny–Kenilworth Road – north-west – Kenilworth	North-eastern end of Maleny–Stanley River Road (Tourist Drive 23). The road starts as Myrtle Street, then Coral Street, and then becomes Maleny–Stanley River Road.
Maleny / Wootha midpoint	2.9	1.8	Mountain View Road – south-east – Maleny, Bald Knob	Road continues south-west, with no route number.
Wootha	7.2	4.5	Burnett Lane (to Reesville Road) – north-west – Reesville	Road continues south-west.
Cedarton / Peachester midpoint	20.3	12.6	Kilcoy–Beerwah Road – north-east – Beerwah – south-west – Woodford	South-western end of Maleny–Stanley River Road.
1.000 mi = 1.609 km; 1.000 km = 0.621 mi: Route transition

== Montville–Mapleton Road ==
Montville–Mapleton Road
- Location: Maleny–Montville Road, Montville to Nambour–Mapleton Road, Mapleton
- Length: 9.5 km (5.9 mi)
- Route number: 23

Montville–Mapleton Road is a state-controlled district road (number 499) rated as a local road of regional significance (LRRS). It runs from Maleny–Montville Road in Montville, via Flaxton, to Nambour–Mapleton Road in Mapleton, a distance of 9.5 kilometres (5.9 mi). This road is also known as Flaxton Drive. It is part of Tourist Drive 23.

The road runs from south to north along the eastern edge of the Blackall Range. Its elevation varies from a highest point of 419 metres (1,375 ft) to a lowest point of 299 metres (981 ft). About 3.9 kilometres (2.4 mi) is steeper than 5%, of which 970 metres (3,180 ft) is between 10% and 15%, and 1.1 kilometres (0.68 mi) is greater than 15%.

=== Major intersections (Montville–Mapleton Road) ===
All distances are from Google Maps. The entire road is within the Sunshine Coast local government area.

Location	km	mi	Destinations	Notes
Montville	0	0.0	Maleny–Montville Road – south – Maleny; Woombye–Montville Road – south-east – Palmwoods, Woombye	Southern end of Montville–Mapleton Road (Tourist Drive 23). The road starts as Main Street.
Montville	0.7	0.43	Razorback Road – north-east – Hunchy	Road continues north-west as Main Street, changing to Flaxton Drive when it leaves Montville.
Flaxton	6.0	3.7	Philipps Road – north-east – Dulong	Road continues north-west.
Mapleton	9.5	5.9	Nambour–Mapleton Road – north, then east – Nambour; Obi Obi Road – south-west – Obi Obi	North-western end of Montville–Mapleton Road (Tourist Drive 23).
1.000 mi = 1.609 km; 1.000 km = 0.621 mi: Route transition

== Nambour–Mapleton Road ==
Nambour–Mapleton Road
- Location: Nambour Connection Road, Nambour to Montville–Mapleton Road, Mapleton
- Length: 12.2 km (7.6 mi)
- Route number: 23

Nambour–Mapleton Road is a state-controlled district road (number 496) rated as a local road of regional significance (LRRS). It runs from Nambour Connection Road to Montville–Mapleton Road in Mapleton, a distance of 12.2 kilometres (7.6 mi).

The road runs generally west from Nambour, ascending the north-eastern slope of the Blackall Range. It climbs from a lowest point of 21 metres (69 ft) to a highest point of 370 metres (1,210 ft). About 2.2 kilometres (1.4 mi) is steeper than 5%, of which 900 metres (3,000 ft) is between 10% and 15%, and 490 metres (1,610 ft) is greater than 15%.

=== Major intersections (Nambour–Mapleton Road) ===
All distances are from Google Maps. The entire road is within the Sunshine Coast local government area.

Location	km	mi	Destinations	Notes
Nambour	0	0.0	Nambour Connection Road – south-west – Woombye – north-east – Yandina	Eastern end of Nambour–Mapleton Road (Tourist Drive 23). The road starts as National Park Road, becomes Netherton Street, then Blackall Terrace, and then Nambour–Mapleton Road.
Nambour	2.4	1.5	Image Flat Road – north-east – Image Flat	Road continues south-west.
Kureelpa	7.0	4.3	Dulong Road – south-east – Dulong	Road continues north-west.
Mapleton	12.2	7.6	Montville–Mapleton Road – south – Montville; Obi Obi Road – south-west – Obi Obi	Western end of Nambour–Mapleton Road (Tourist Drive 23).
1.000 mi = 1.609 km; 1.000 km = 0.621 mi: Route transition

== Obi Obi Road ==
Obi Obi Road
- Location: Montville-Mapleton Road, Mapleton to Eumundi–Kenilworth Road, Kenilworth
- Length: 19.5 km (12.1 mi)

Obi Obi Road is a state-controlled district road (number 4962) rated as a local road of regional significance (LRRS). It runs from Montville–Mapleton Road in Mapleton, via Obi Obi and Kidaman Creek, to Eumundi–Kenilworth Road in Kenilworth, a distance of 19.5 kilometres (12.1 mi). There are no major intersections on this road.

The road descends the north-western slope of the Blackall Range and then follows the valley of Obi Obi Creek north-west to Kenilworth. It descends from a highest point of 424 metres (1,391 ft) to a lowest point of 95 metres (312 ft). About 3 kilometres (1.9 mi) is steeper than 5%, of which 570 metres (1,870 ft) is between 10% and 15%, and 830 metres (2,720 ft) is greater than 15%.

Part of this road is split between uphill and downhill sections. The downhill section is mostly unsealed.

== Woombye–Montville Road ==
Woombye–Montville Road
- Location: Nambour Connection Road, Woombye to Maleny–Montville Road, Montville
- Length: 13.1 km (8.1 mi)

Woombye–Montville Road is a state-controlled district road (number 498) rated as a local road of regional significance (LRRS). It runs from the Nambour Connection Road in Woombye, via Palmwoods, to Maleny–Montville Road in Montville, a distance of 13.1 kilometres (8.1 mi). This road is also known as Woombye–Palmwoods Road and Palmwoods–Montville Road.

The road runs generally south-west from Woombye, passing through Palmwwoods, where Palmwoods–Mooloolah Road exits to the south as Chevallum Road, and following the valley of Paynter Creek to the foot of the eastern escarpment of the Blackall Range, which it ascends by a circuitous route. It climbs from a lowest point of 21 metres (69 ft) to a highest point of 380 metres (1,250 ft). About 2.4 kilometres (1.5 mi) is steeper than 5%, of which 590 metres (1,940 ft) is between 10% and 15%, and 1.5 kilometres (0.93 mi) is greater than 15%.

=== Major intersections (Woombye–Montville Road) ===
All distances are from Google Maps. The entire road is within the Sunshine Coast local government area.

Location	km	mi	Destinations	Notes
Woombye	0	0.0	Nambour Connection Road – south-east – Forest Glen – north-west – Nambour	Eastern end of Woombye–Montville Road. The road starts as Woombye–Palmwoods Road.
Palmwoods	3.2	2.0	Palmwoods–Mooloolah Road (Chevallum Road) – south – Chevallum, Mooloolah Valley	Road passes under the railway line and turns south-west as Palmwoods-Montville Road.
Palmwoods	5.6	3.5	Hunchy Road – north, then west – Hunchy	Road continues south-west.
Montville	13.1	8.1	Montville–Mapleton Road – north – Mapleton; Maleny–Montville Road – south – Maleny	Western end of Woombye–Montville Road.
1.000 mi = 1.609 km; 1.000 km = 0.621 mi: Route transition

== Palmwoods–Mooloolah Road ==
Palmwoods–Mooloolah Road
- Location: Woombye–Montville Road, Palmwoods to Mooloolah Connection Road, Mooloolah Valley
- Length: 10.5 km (6.5 mi)

Palmwoods–Mooloolah Road is a state-controlled district road (number 4981) rated as a local road of regional significance (LRRS). It runs from Woombye–Montville Road in Palmwoods to Mooloolah Connection Road in Mooloolah Valley, a distance of 10.5 kilometres (6.5 mi). This road is also known as Chevallum Road and Eudlo Road.

== Tourist Drive 23 ==
Tourist Drive 23 follows Landsborough–Maleny Road until it reaches an intersection with Mountain View Road as it enters Maleny. Here it turns south-west and continues in a generally west direction until it reaches an intersection with Maleny–Stanley River Road, where it turns north. It continues north until it reaches an intersection with Landsborough–Maleny Road (to the east) and Maleny–Kenilworth Road (to the north-west). Here it turns east and continues through the Maleny CBD and on until it reaches an intersection with Maleny–Montville Road.

Turning north it follows Maleny–Montville Road, Montville–Mapleton Road, and Nambour–Mapleton Road to its end in Nambour. Tourist Drive 23 continues across the Nambour Connection Road onto Nambour–Bli Bli Road, which it follows to the Bruce Highway.

== History ==
A track linking Landsborough to Maleny was cut in 1880.

By 1922, "good" roads existed from Landsborough to Maleny and from Nambour to Mapleton and on to Montville. Plans were in hand to link Maleny to Montville and to build a new "first-class" road from Palmwoods to Montville.
