= West Woombye, Queensland =

West Woombye
- Suburb
- Interactive map of West Woombye
- Coordinates: 26.6622°S 152.9261°E
- Country: Australia
- State: Queensland
- City: Sunshine Coast
- LGA: Sunshine Coast Region
- Location: 5.0 km (3.1 mi) W of Woombye; 6.7 km (4.2 mi) SW of Nambour; 6.9 km (4.3 mi) SW of Burnside; 114 km (71 mi) N of Brisbane

Government
  - State electorate: Nicklin
  - Federal divisions: Fisher; Fairfax

Area
  - Total: 11.6 km^{2} (4.5 sq mi)

Population
  - Total: 1,083 (2021 census)
  - Density: 93.4/km^{2} (241.8/sq mi)
- Time zone: UTC+10:00 (AEST)
- Postcode: 4559
Suburbs around West Woombye
| Dulong | Towen Mountain | Coes Creek |
| Hunchy | West Woombye | Woombye |
| Hunchy | Hunchy | Palmwoods |

West Woombye is a rural residential locality in the Sunshine Coast Region, Queensland, Australia. In the 2021 census, West Woombye had a population of 1,083 people.

== Geography ==
West Woombye is in the Sunshine Coast hinterland. As the name suggests, it is west of the town and locality of Woombye. The surrounding suburbs include Towen Mountain, Hunchy, Dulong, Palmwoods and Coes Creek. There is farming within the area with crops such as lychees, macadamias, mangoes and avocados grown.

The main road running through West Woombye is Blackall Range Road. This road turns into Dulong Road once in the suburb of Dulong. As the area incorporates the Blackall Range leading up to Montville, the area is noted for its scenery. However, there are a number of notable creeks within area prone to flooding in heavy rain, primarily Petrie Creek. This mostly affects the roads off Blackall Range Road, such as Ruwoldt Road, Carruthers Road, and the Jackson Road area.

== History ==
The name Woombye comes from the Kabi word wambai meaning black myrtle tree, which was used for handles for axes.

== Demographics ==
In the 2016 census, West Woombye had a population of 1,007 people.

In the 2021 census, West Woombye had a population of 1,083 people.

== Education ==
There are no schools in West Woombye. The nearest government primary schools are Woombye State School in neighbouring Woombye to the east, Burnside State School in Burnside to the north, Mapleton State School in Mapleton to the north-west, and Montville State School in Montville to the south-west. The nearest government secondary schools are Burnside State High School in Burnside to the north and Nambour State College in Nambour to the north-east.

== Amenities ==
There are a number of parks in the locality, including:

- Floydia Bushland Reserve (26.6595°S 152.9387°E)
- Ted Duffield Memorial Park (26.6676°S 152.9320°E)
- Triunia Bushland Reserve (26.6524°S 152.9102°E)
- Triunia Conservation Area (26.6557°S 152.9074°E)
