= Hilton Bendixen =

Australian cricketer

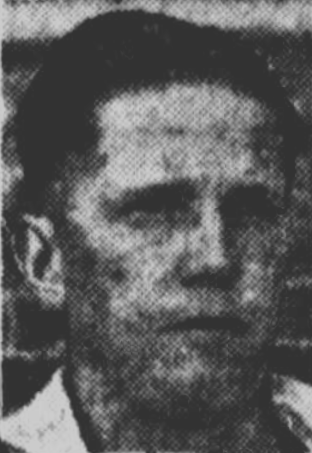

Personal information
- Born: 21 February 1910; Nambour, Queensland, Australia
- Died: 15 April 1962 (aged 52); Nambour, Queensland, Australia
- Source: Cricinfo, 1 October 2020

Hilton Bendixen (21 February 1910 – 15 April 1962) was an Australian cricketer who was a tall left-handed medium-fast bowler who bowled a consistent length, utilized swing, and also occasionally bowled spin. He played in one first-class match for Queensland in 1941.

== Cricket career ==
Bendixen began his cricket career playing for Western Suburbs juniors in Nambour and in 1932 he made his A Grade debut for Nambour and took 4 for 141. He helped Nambour win against a Brisbane XI in 1935 by taking three wickets. In October he took 4 for 13 against Landsborough for Nambour earning praise for his accuracy as a bowler, and in November a report noted his bowling form seemed to be improving every match. In February 1936 a report noted Bendixen may be selected for the State if he could perform well in the country cricket carnival in Brisbane, as there was a lack of good Queensland bowlers. In September he decided to improve his cricket by playing in Brisbane Grade Cricket, traveling to the city from Nambour on weekends, and he was trialed by the Brisbane Colts team, however as of 1937 he was still playing for Nambour. In 1937 he was selected to represent Maroochy district in a combined Wide Bay XI against a combined Brisbane XI.

In 1939, Bendixen married and was presented with a chromium plated smokers' stand by the Nambour Cricket Club. He represented a Maroochy team at the Country Week Cricket carnival in 1940, taking 27 wickets at an average of 14.15. In November 1940 he took 9 for 47 in a match for Nambour against Palmwoods utilizing swing bowling but also a leg-break, and he performed well with the bat in the season scoring prolifically including a century.

In December 1940 it was suggested that established Queensland State players may be rested in an upcoming First-class game against Victoria with promising country cricketers being selected instead and State selector J.H. Holdsworth watched a game Bendixen played in that month, and in January 1941 it was reported he was being seriously considered for selection for Queensland. Bendixen was selected, making him the first cricketer from Maroochy district to represent the State, and played his only First-class match against Victoria that month. The Nambour Chronicle described him as being very unlucky, not receiving the new ball, only bowling four overs in his first spell, had two chances missed off his bowling, and was struck by a fast delivery while batting forcing him to retire hurt to receive medical attention. He was invited to join the Valley team in the Queensland Cricket Association after the game, but declined to make a decision before conferring with Nambour, and as of November 1941 he was still playing cricket in Nambour for Wanderers Cricket Club.

Bendixen served in the Army during World War II interrupting his cricket career as he enlisted in Brisbane in February 1942 and served until November 1945 achieving the rank of Staff Sergeant. In 1947 he was in contention for selection in a Queensland ex-soldiers team which was to play a NSW ex-soldiers team. In 1953 he joined the Nambour Fitness Club as he was aiming to make a come-back to cricket, and he did continue playing until at least 1954.

== See also ==
- List of Queensland first-class cricketers
