= Maroochydore Aerodrome =

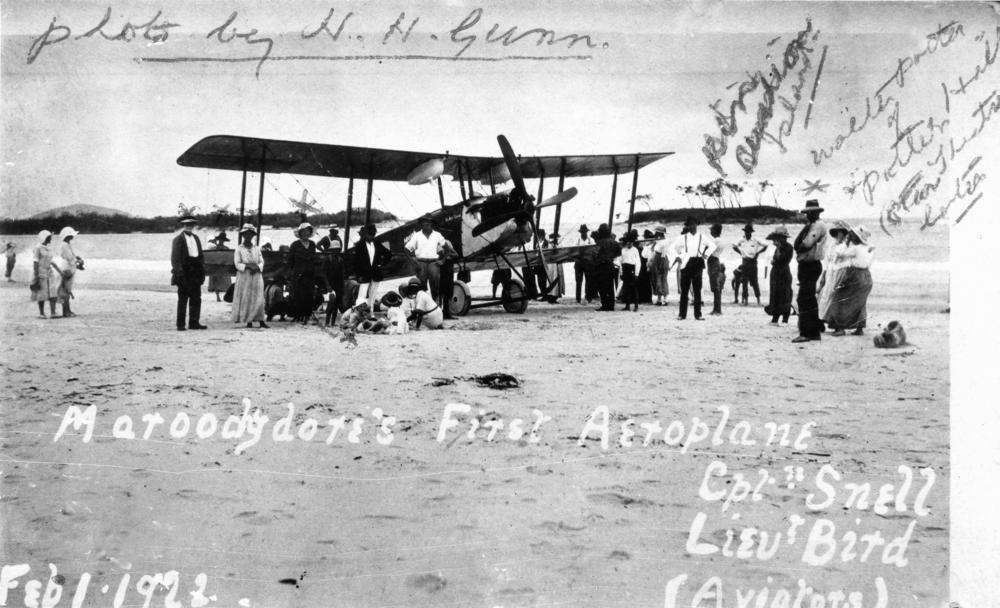
- Maroochydore's first aeroplane, 1922. Crowds on the beach to see the first aeroplane at Maroochydore on 1 February 1922.
- IATA: none; ICAO: none

Summary
- Airport type: Defunct
- Serves: Maroochydore
- Location: Maroochydore, Sunshine Coast Region
- Opened: January 9, 1931; 95 years ago
- Closed: 1937
- Coordinates: 26°39′33″S 153°05′51″E

Map
- Shown within Queensland Maroochydore Aerodrome (Australia)

Maroochydore Aerodrome was an airfield located in Maroochydore, Sunshine Coast Region, Queensland in Australia. It was established in 1931 and closed in 1937, hosting three air pageants and airline services. The Aerodrome Road was named after the old airfield, and runs through where it once stood.

== History ==
The first aircraft to land in Maroochydore was an Avro 504K on Maroochydore Beach, 1 February 1922. The pilots were Captain P. W. Snell and Lieutenant S. W. Bird. During midday, they inadvertently landed on the beach, discovering a place named Maroochydore, which was unmentioned on maps at the time. On 24 December 1926, an Airco DH.6 of the Eagle Aviation Service arrived at Maroochydore Beach from Brisbane Aerodrome. It was announced that more flights would be arranged during Christmas and New Years Holidays. By the late 1920s, aircraft such as the Avro 504 and Avro Avian continuously flew joyrides from Maroochydore Beach.

On 7 October 1928, Captain Tracey, accompanied by Mr Norman T. Walsh, sales manager of Queensland Air Navigation Ltd., landed at Maroochydore Beach to select an aerodrome site. Following an inspection of available ground, a site was selected on an undeveloped plain near the main beach. On 15 October, a meeting of the Maroochydore Association was held discussing ways and means of clearing the ground. On 21 November 1930, a large portion of the ground secured at Maroochydore for an aerodrome site was felled and cleared. A portion of the land was owned by Mr. W. Parker, while the other portion adjoining Parker's property was a town reserve, divided by a piece of fence that ran through the cleared ground. Every time an aircraft was due to land at the aerodrome, fencing would have to be removed and replaced afterwards. In December 1930, arrangements were made for a five-year lease of Mr. Parker's property, allowing the fence to be permanently removed and the aerodrome to be licensed. By 2 January 1931, the runway was cleared of encumbrances. Eventually, the plains was cleared and a 548 meter long landing strip for light aircraft was marked out.

=== Operation ===
On 9 January 1931, Maroochydore Aerodrome was officially opened, drawing large crowds leaving Buderim to attend the opening event. After the opening of Maroochydore Aerodrome, on 9 January 1931, Sky Travel (Australia) Ltd. commenced a regular service between Maroochydore and Brisbane. The Maroochydore Aero Club was established by Nambour policeman Constable Appleby, which held flying courses for an "A" Pilot's Certificate. On 29 May 1934, a suggestion was made by strawberry growers to forward strawberries from the North Coast to Sydney by aircraft. The scheme included an arrangement to pick up strawberries three times a week from Maroochydore Aerodrome by New England Airways Ltd.

By 1935, Constable Appleby was transferred from the area and without his leadership, the aero club soon fell apart. On 12 November 1937, Department of Civil Aviation inspector Mr. Mowbray inspected Maroochydore Aerodrome, expressing that an expenditure of £2,000 would be necessary to make the ground suitable for modern aircraft. Subsequently, the Maroochydore Progress Association requested the Maroochy Shire Council to request a grant of £500 from the State Government, allowing ground improvements on the airfield. Maroochydore Aerodrome became an emergency landing ground after that. A topographic map dated November 1942 depicted that a road was built over the former aerodrome, with multiple buildings lining the road. Today, this road is known as Aerodrome Road. The search for a new airfield soon followed, and a site was proposed by the Near North Coast and Mary Valley Council Progress Associations by 1954. The newly built Maroochydore Airport was opened on 12 August 1961, and has since replaced the old aerodrome.

By 1 January 1951, only 274 meters of the airstrip was still usable, belonging to Crown land. The airstrip had become overgrown with bracken and small trees, while one end was covered by swamp. Member of Kingaroy Aero Club, Mr. Stewart Sawtell proposed to the Maroochydore Lifesavers' Club that the disused Maroochydore Aerodrome would be reactivated. This would be done with purposes to fly patrols over the coast during holiday seasons with a De Havilland Tiger Moth aircraft. An aerial survey had also been conducted over the disused aerodrome. The effectiveness was discussed, and it was recommended that two small aircraft should be deployed, one going south and the other north.

== Accidents & incidents ==
- On 27 January 1927, an Airco DH.6 registered as G-AUBO was taken on a cross-country journey, piloted by Mr. Leslie Kewell. During flight, a 3-ply tore off from near the nose, and was caught mid-air by Mr. Kewell as it sped by the cockpit. Subsequently, a landing was made to replace the sheet, and the journey continued. Around 40 miles of out of Brisbane, another forced landing was made on Maroochydore Beach, and the aircraft was abandoned there. By 1935, the aircraft was buried beneath a sand dune.
- On 10 March 1933, a light aircraft piloted by Mr E. J. Brinkhurst landed at a private property near Palmwoods, due to unfavorable weather conditions. On the following Monday morning, the aircraft was towed from the property to Maroochydore Aerodrome, where it later departed to continue to Brisbane.
