= Curramore =

Curramore may refer to the following places in Australia:

- Curramore, New South Wales, locality in New South Wales
- Curramore, Queensland, locality in Queensland
  - Curramore Sanctuary, nature reserve in the above locality
