= Coes Creek, Queensland =

Coes Creek
- Suburb
- Interactive map of Coes Creek
- Coordinates: 26.6483°S 152.9427°E
- Country: Australia
- State: Queensland
- City: Sunshine Coast
- LGA: Sunshine Coast Region
- Location: 2.9 km (1.8 mi) SW of Nambour; 19.0 km (11.8 mi) W of Maroochydore; 32.2 km (20.0 mi) NW of Caloundra; 108 km (67 mi) N of Brisbane

Government
  - State electorate: Nicklin
  - Federal division: Fairfax

Area
  - Total: 2.5 km^{2} (0.97 sq mi)

Population
  - Total: 1,515 (2021 census)
  - Density: 606/km^{2} (1,570/sq mi)
- Time zone: UTC+10:00 (AEST)
- Postcode: 4560
Suburbs around Coes Creek
Perwillowen	Burnside	Nambour
Towen Mountain	Coes Creek	Woombye
West Woombye	West Woombye	Woombye

Coes Creek is a rural locality in the Sunshine Coast Region, Queensland, Australia. In the 2021 census, Coes Creek had a population of 1,515 people.

== Geography ==
Petrie Creek, a tributary of the Maroochy River, forms the eastern boundary of the locality. It is named after Queensland pioneer Thomas Petrie.

The main road access to and through the locality is Coe Creek Road, which enters from Burnside to the north, passes through the locality, and terminates on the south-western boundary of the locality in West Woombye.

The land use in north-east and east of the locality is residential with the Maroochy Research Facility occupying the north of the locality. The remaining land is used for a mixture of crop growing and grazing on native vegetation.

== History ==
The locality takes its name from the creek, which in turn was named after selector Robert Coe, who was killed by a train in 1896. The Queensland Place Names Board approved the naming of the creek and the district after Coe on 1 December 1962.

== Demographics ==
In the 2016 census, Coes Creek had a population of 1,392 people.

In the 2021 census, Coes Creek had a population of 1,515 people. The population of Coes Creek comprises 47.9% males, 52.1% females, with a median age of 43.

== Education ==
There are no schools in Coes Creek. The nearest government primary and secondary schools are Burnside State School and Burnside State High School, both in neighbouring Burnside to the north.

In Coes Creek, 41.4% of adult residents have successfully completed high school.

== Amenities ==
There are a number of parks in the area:

- Chiltern Court Park (26.6464°S 152.9509°E)
- Gardenvale Park (26.6461°S 152.9521°E)
- Middle Park Court Park (26.6494°S 152.9461°E)
- Puch St Park (26.6468°S 152.9548°E)

== Facilities ==
The Maroochy Research Facility is on a 64-hectare (160-acre) site at 47 Mayers Road (26.6434°S 152.9379°E). It is operated by the Department of Agriculture and Fisheries and focuses on research on growing sub-tropical crops, including strawberries, stone fruit, custard apples, pineapples and ginger.
