= Landers Shoot, Queensland =

Landers Shoot
- Suburb
- Interactive map of Landers Shoot
- Coordinates: 26.715°S 152.9261°E
- Country: Australia
- State: Queensland
- LGA: Sunshine Coast Region
- Location: 11.6 km (7.2 mi) WSW of Nambour; 30.2 km (18.8 mi) NW of Caloundra; 102 km (63 mi) N of Brisbane CBD
- Established: 1861

Government
  - State electorate: Glass House
  - Federal division: Fisher

Area
  - Total: 4.7 km^{2} (1.8 sq mi)

Population
  - Total: 308 (2021 census)
  - Density: 65.5/km^{2} (169.7/sq mi)
- Time zone: UTC+10:00 (AEST)
- Postcode: 4555
Suburbs around Landers Shoot
Montville	Palmwoods	Palmwoods
Montville	Landers Shoot	Eudlo
Montville	Eudlo	Eudlo

Landers Shoot is a rural locality in the Sunshine Coast Region, Queensland, Australia. In the 2021 census, Landers Shoot had a population of 308 people.

== Geography ==
Landers Shoot is in the Sunshine Coast hinterland.

== History ==
Edmund Lander leased the area known as the Mooloolah Back Plain from the Queensland Government in 1861. He, along with other pioneers, harvested the timber along the Blackall Range. When the timber was harvested, the bark was stripped, making them slippery from the sap and a sharp point was made on one end of the tree. The tree was then pushed over the eastern side of the cliff down "chutes" (to be collected at the bottom, and transported to the nearest mills). Landers Shoot (a corruption of Lander's Chute) was the base region where the logs arrived at the base of the cliff.

Lander's Shoot State School opened on 17 February 1914 and closed on 31 December 1944. It was at approx 471 Upper Landershute Road (26.7207°S 152.9176°E).

== Demographics ==
In the 2016 census, Landers Shoot had a population of 252 people.

In the 2021 census, Landers Shoot had a population of 308 people.

== Education ==
There are no schools in Landers Shoot. The nearest government primary schools are Eudlo State School in neighbouring Eudlo to the south-east and Montville State School in neighbouring Montville to the north-west. The nearest government secondary school is Nambour State College in Nambour to the north.

== Facilities ==
Despite the name, Landers Shute Advanced Water Treatment Plant is a sewage treatment plant in neighbouring Montville, but is adjacent to the locality boundary with the Landers Shute.
