= Mapleton Falls National Park =

National park in Australia

- IUCN category II (national park)
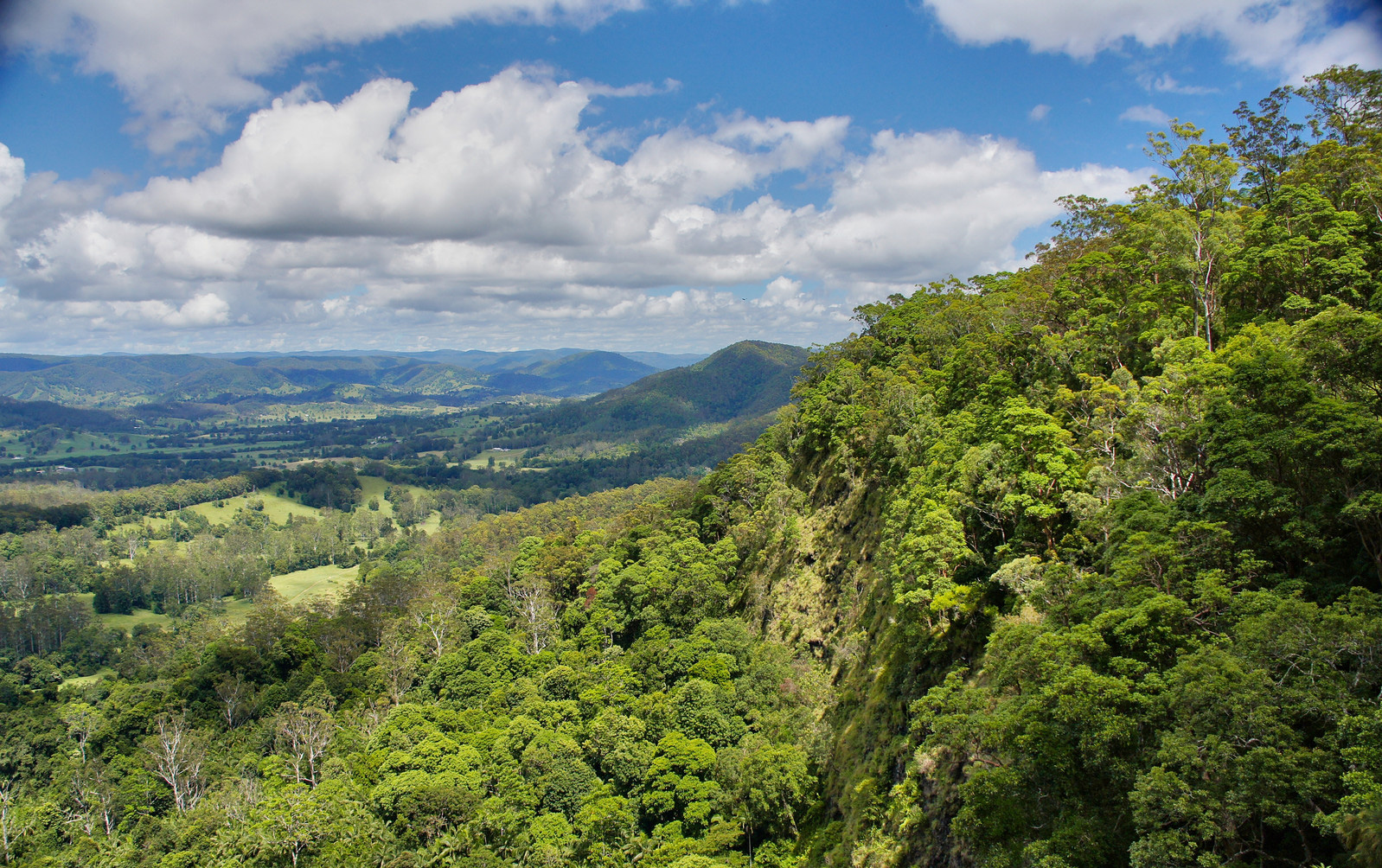
- Mapleton Falls National Park, February 2015

- Location within Queensland
- Location: Queensland
- Nearest city: Mapleton, Queensland
- Coordinates: 26°37′50″S 152°50′20″E
- Area: 0.26 km^{2} (0.10 sq mi)
- Established: 1973
- Governing body: Queensland Parks and Wildlife Service
- Website: Official website

Mapleton Falls is a national park near the town of Mapleton on the Blackall Range in South East Queensland, Australia, 95 kilometres (59 mi) north of Brisbane. The falls are part of Pencil Creek and drop 120 metres (390 ft).

The waterfall became a forest reserve in 1938 and then in 1973 it was declared a national park.

Section 2 of the Sunshine Coast Hinterland Great Walk, a rugged long-distance walking track, passes through the park. There are a number of smaller walks as well.

== See also ==
- Protected areas of Queensland
- List of long-distance hiking tracks in Australia
