= Hunchy, Queensland =

Hunchy
- Suburb
- Interactive map of Hunchy
- Coordinates: 26.6802°S 152.915°E
- Country: Australia
- State: Queensland
- LGA: Sunshine Coast Region
- Location: 12.5 km (7.8 mi) SW of Nambour; 18.6 km (11.6 mi) NE of Maleny; 31.2 km (19.4 mi) NW of Caloundra; 107 km (66 mi) N of Brisbane

Government
  - State electorates: Nicklin; Glass House
  - Federal division: Fisher

Area
  - Total: 11.9 km^{2} (4.6 sq mi)

Population
  - Total: 592 (2021 census)
  - Density: 49.75/km^{2} (128.8/sq mi)
- Time zone: UTC+10:00 (AEST)
- Postcode: 4555
Suburbs around Hunchy
Dulong	West Woombye	West Woombye
Flaxton	Hunchy	Palmwoods
Montville	Montville	Palmwoods

Hunchy is a rural locality in the Sunshine Coast, Queensland, Australia. In the 2021 census, Hunchy had a population of 592 people.

== Geography ==
Hunchy is in the foothills of the Blackall Range and was first called Hunchback.

Huncy is a community of small farms, mostly used for dairy cattle, but also growing crops including pineapples, lychees, bananas, citrus, and avocado.

== History ==
The Hunchy area is within the traditional lands of the Kabi Kabi and Jinibara people.

The first settlers arrived in area in the late 1880s.

Hunchy State School opened on 18 August 1924. It closed on 31 December 1969. It was at 53-61 Hunchy School Road (26.6748°S 152.8994°E). Over the years of its operation the school had a total of 249 students and 19 teachers. The high-set one-room school building is still extant on the site and has been used as a community centre since the 1980s. On Sunday 18 August 2024, the centenary of the school's opening was celebrated at the school building.

== Demographics ==
In the 2011 census, Hunchy had a population of 524 people.

In the 2016 census, Hunchy had a population of 549 people.

In the 2021 census, Hunchy had a population of 592 people.

== Education ==
There are no schools in Hunchy. The nearest government primary schools are Montville State School in neighbouring Montville to the east and Palmwoods State School in neighbouring Palmwoods to the east. The nearest government secondary schools are Maleny State High School in Maleny to the south-east, Burnside State High School in Burnside to the north-west, and Nambour State College in Nambour, also to the north-west.
