= Towen Mountain, Queensland =

Towen Mountain
- Suburb
- Interactive map of Towen Mountain
- Coordinates: 26.6483°S 152.9261°E
- Country: Australia
- State: Queensland
- LGA: Sunshine Coast Region
- Location: 4.0 km (2.5 mi) SW of Nambour; 32.6 km (20.3 mi) NW of Caloundra; 113 km (70 mi) N of Brisbane

Government
  - State electorate: Nicklin
  - Federal division: Fairfax

Area
  - Total: 3.5 km^{2} (1.4 sq mi)

Population
  - Total: 304 (2021 census)
  - Density: 86.9/km^{2} (225/sq mi)
- Time zone: UTC+10:00 (AEST)
- Postcode: 4560
Suburbs around Towen Mountain
Perwillowen	Perwillowen	Perwillowen
Dulong	Towen Mountain	Coes Creek
West Woombye	West Woombye	West Woombye

Towen Mountain is a rural locality in the Sunshine Coast Region, Queensland, Australia. In the 2021 census, Towen Mountain had a population of 304 people.

== Geography ==
Much of the land is used for rural residential purposes, but some is used for grazing on native vegetation and crop growing.

== Demographics ==
In the 2016 census, Towen Mountain had a population of 289 people.

In the 2021 census, Towen Mountain had a population of 304 people.

== Education ==
There are no schools in Towen Mountain. The nearest government primary school is Burnside State School in Burnside to the north-east. The nearest government secondary school is Burnside State High School in Burnside. There are also non-government schools in Burnside and other Nambour suburbs.
