= Woombye, Queensland =

Woombye
- Town
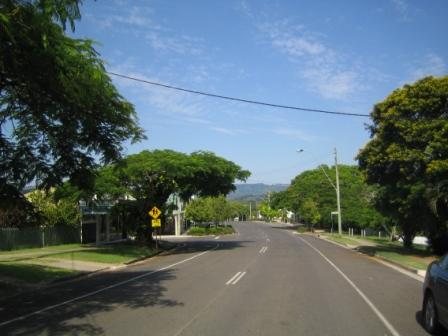
- Eastern end of the main street

- Interactive map of Woombye
- Coordinates: 26.6602°S 152.9658°E
- Country: Australia
- State: Queensland
- LGA: Sunshine Coast Region
- Location: 3.9 km (2.4 mi) S of Nambour; 26.6 km (16.5 mi) NW of Caloundra; 102 km (63 mi) N of Brisbane

Government
  - State electorate: Nicklin
  - Federal division: Fairfax

Area
  - Total: 13.8 km^{2} (5.3 sq mi)

Population
  - Total: 3,944 (2021 census)
  - Density: 285.8/km^{2} (740.2/sq mi)
- Time zone: UTC+10:00 (AEST)
- Postcode: 4559
Localities around Woombye
Burnside; Coes Creek	Nambour; Rosemount	Diddillibah
West Woombye	Woombye	Kiels Mountain
Palmwoods	Chevallum	Forest Glen

Woombye is a rural town and locality in the Sunshine Coast Region, Queensland, Australia. In the 2021 census, the locality of Woombye had a population of 3,944 people.

== Geography ==
Woombye is located on the Sunshine Coast hinterland in Queensland, Australia, approximately 100 kilometres (62 mi) north of the Brisbane CBD. The name is derived from words from the local Aboriginal language - a place (wumbai) of black snake, or (wambai) black myrtle or axe handle made from black myrtle.

The Bruce Highway forms the eastern boundary of the locality. The North Coast railway line runs from north to south through the western part of the locality; the town is centred around the Woombye railway station (26.6605°S 152.9628°E) in the west of the locality.

Woombye–Montville Road exits to the south.

== History ==
The town has its roots in a settlement first known as Middle Camp, and later Cobb's Camp. It was established in 1868 as a staging depot and hotel for Cobb & Co stagecoaches at the halfway point on the road between Brisbane and Gympie, after the discovery of gold at Gympie.

The town was renamed as Woombye in the 1880s. The name Woombye comes from the Kabi word wambai meaning black myrtle tree, which was used for handles for axes.

Cobbs Camp Provisional School opened on 17 August 1885. The school was renamed Woombye State School in 1892. In 1977, a preschool was added to Woombye State School.

In 1891, the North Coast railway from Landsborough to Yandina was opened, and it became a rail centre until 1914.

On Wednesday 19 May 1897, a stump-capping ceremony was held for an Anglican church in Woombye. The church was built by volunteer labour led by Mr Kitson. St Margaret's Anglican Church was dedicated on Monday 28 Mary 1898 by Bishop William Webber. The timber church could seat 100 people.

Woombye Pub was opened in 1900 as The Criterion Hotel, a hotel which stands on the site as a pub.

The first Woombye Agricultural Show was held on 3 June 1900. It continued as an annual tradition until 1909 when the event relocated to the Nambour Showground.

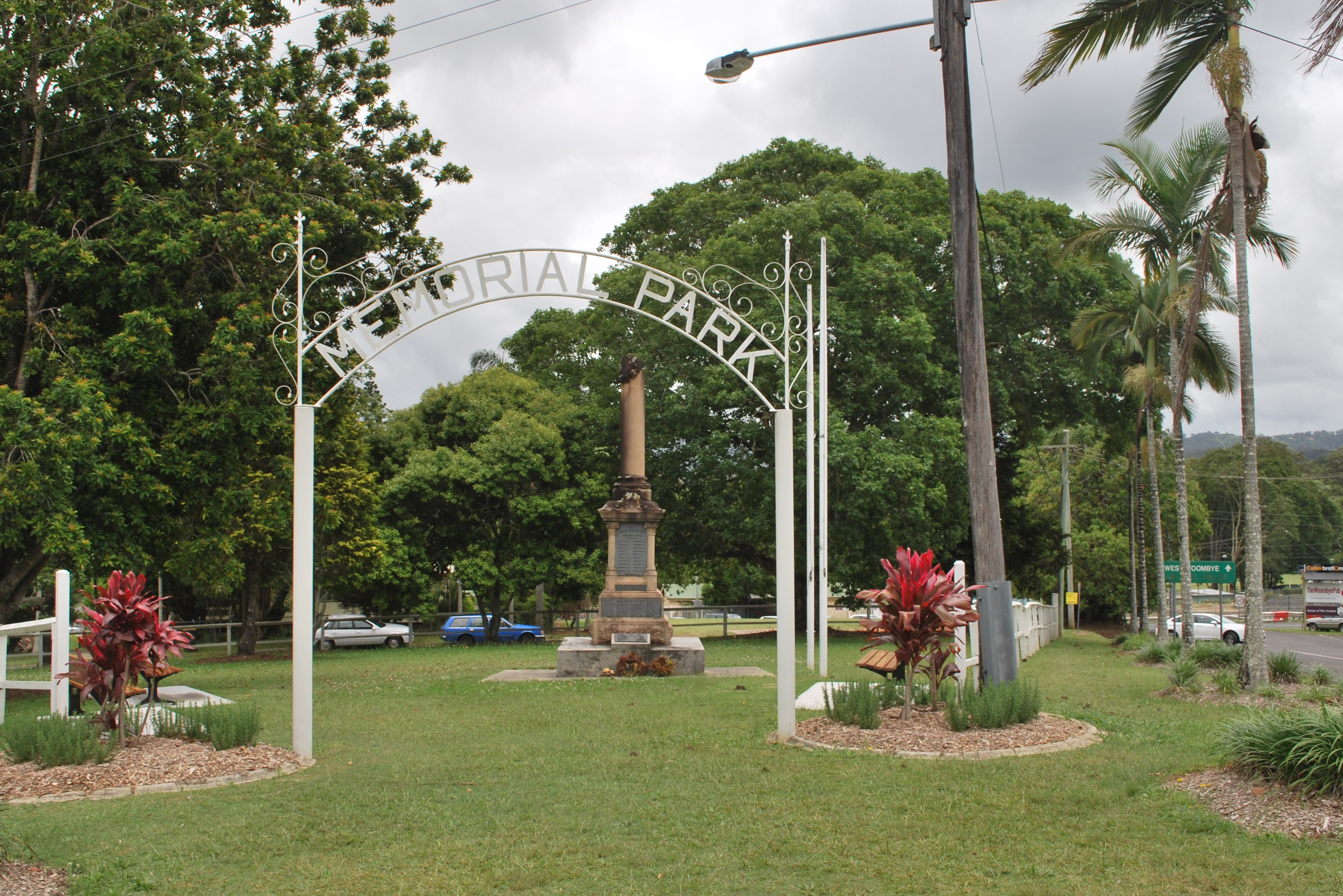
Woombye War Memorial and Memorial Park, 2010

The Woombye War Memorial was unveiled on 18 June 1925 by the Queensland Governor, Matthew Nathan.

The Woombye branch of the Queensland Country Women's Association had formed before 1930.

The Big Pineapple opened on 15 August 1971.

Thrill Hill Waterslides opened in 1979.

On 5 February 1979, the Christian Outreach College (Sunshine Coast) was established by the Nambour Christian Outreach Centre on a 26-acre (11 ha) pineapple farm. The church and school were later renamed Suncoast Church and Suncoast Christian College respectively. In 2004, an adjoining 16-acre (6.5 ha) pineapple farm was purchased to expand the school.

On 29 January 1980, Nambour Christian College was established with 36 students by the families of the New Life Assembly of God Nambour church. The name was changed to Nambour Christian College in 1992.

== Demographics ==
In the 2006 census, the locality of Woombye had a population of 2,094 people.

In the 2016 census, the locality of Woombye had a population of 3,246 people.

In the 2021 census, the locality of Woombye had a population of 3,944 people.

== Education ==
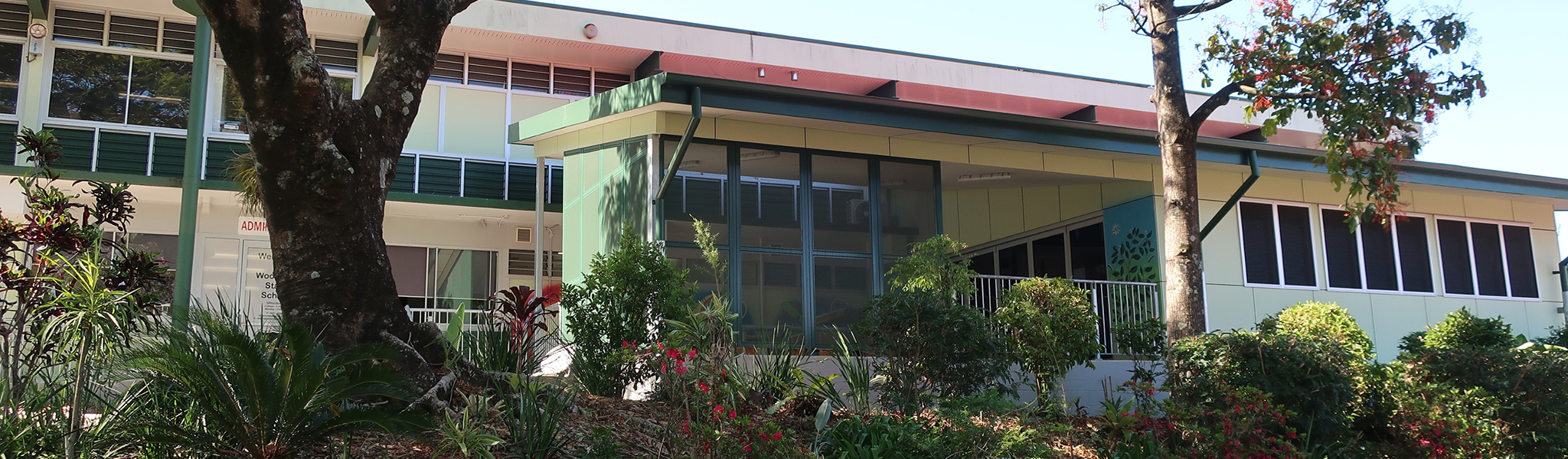
Woombye State School, 2023

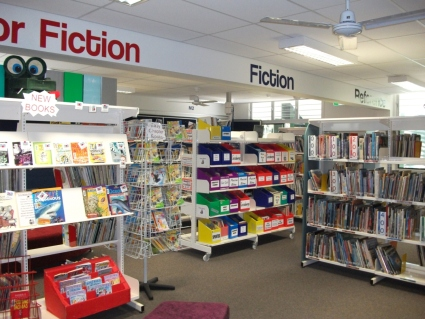
Library, Woombye State School, 2011

Woombye State School is a government primary (Prep–6) school for boys and girls at 95 Pine Grove Road (26.6677°S 152.9738°E). The school has a special education program. In 2017, the school had an enrolment of 506 students with 41 teachers (32 full-time equivalent) and 21 non-teaching staff (14 full-time equivalent). In 2022, the school had an enrolment of 458 students.

Suncoast Christian College is a private primary and secondary (Prep–12) school for boys and girls at the corner of Schubert & Kiel Mountain Roads (26.6658°S 152.9777°E). In 2017, the school had an enrolment of 803 students with 67 teachers (57 full-time equivalent) and 70 non-teaching staff (42 full-time equivalent). At 6 August 2021, the school had 878 students.

Nambour Christian College is a private primary and secondary (Prep–12) school for boys and girls at McKenzie Road (26.6439°S 152.9616°E). In 2017, the school had an enrolment of 1,131 students with 87 teachers (80 full-time equivalent) and 95 non-teaching staff (59 full-time equivalent). In December 2022, the school had 1,214 students.

There are no government secondary schools in Woombye. The nearest government secondary schools are Nambour State College in neighbouring Nambour to the north and Burnside State High School in neighbouring Burnside to the north-west.

== Amenities ==
The Woombye Snakes are a soccer club. It was established in 1968.

St Margaret's Anglican Church is at 16 Blackall Street (26.660617°S 152.9652°E).

== Tourism ==
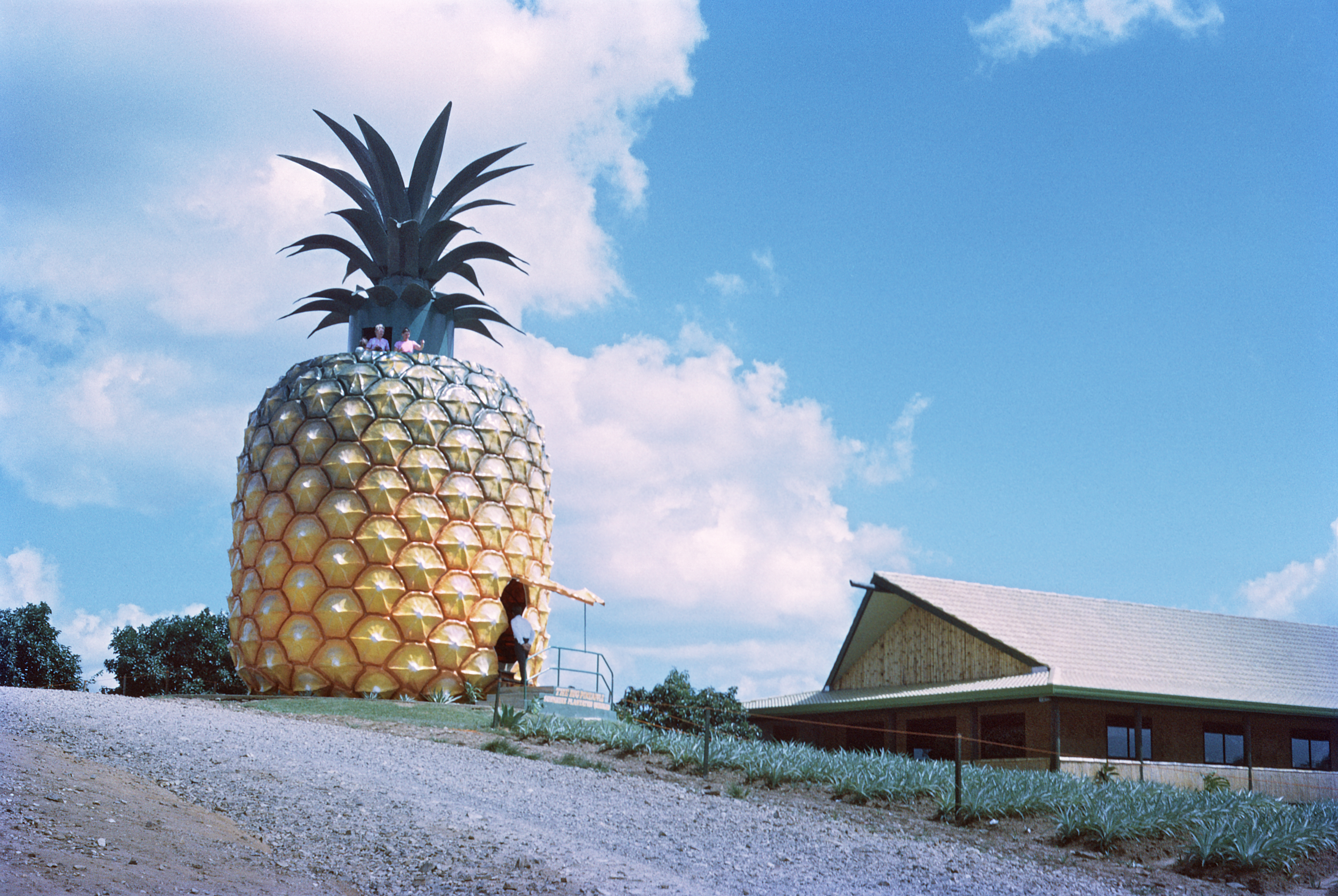
Big Pineapple, 1972

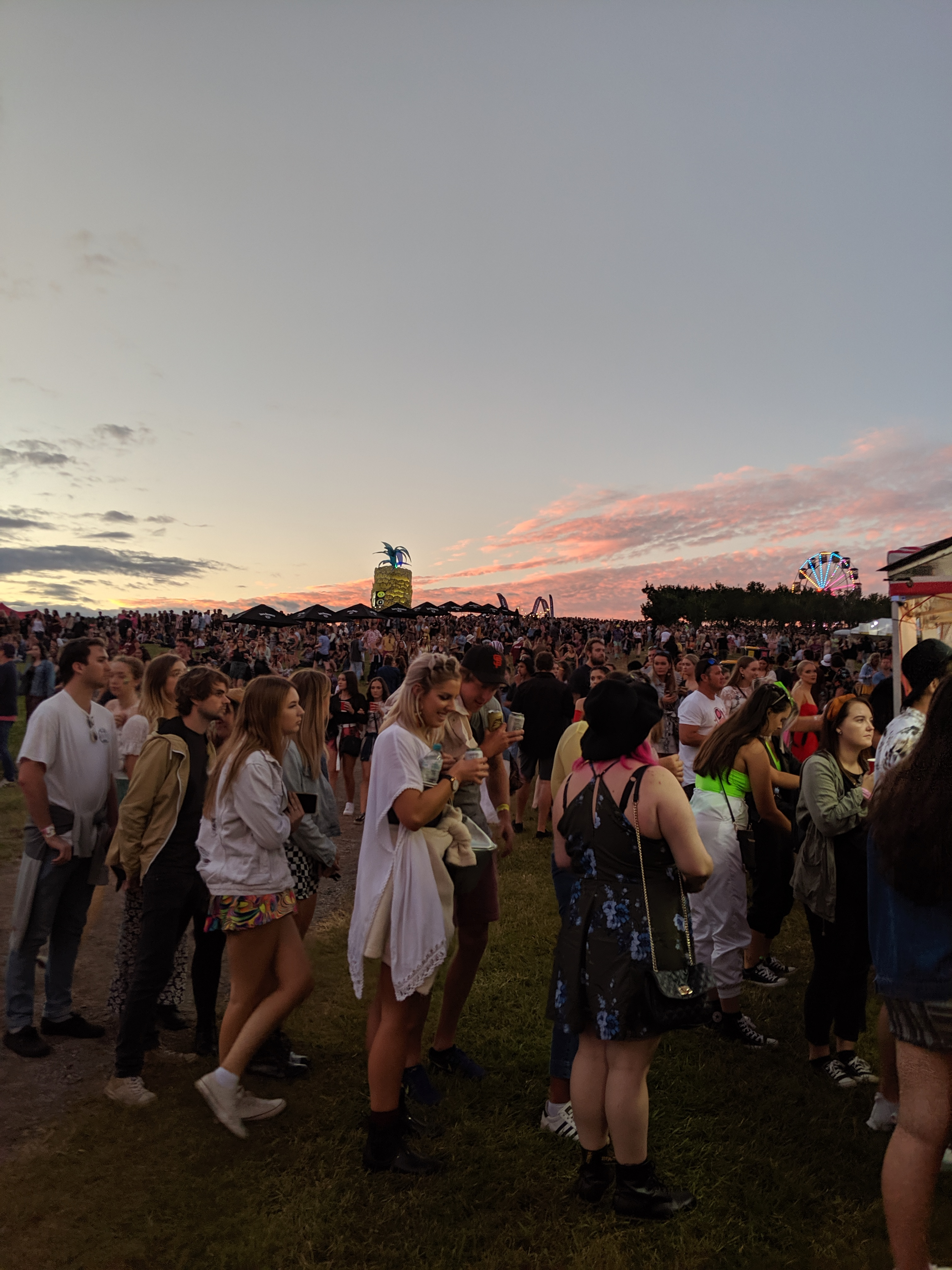
Big Pineapple Music Festival, 2019

Woombye is home to The Big Pineapple, a tourist attraction which is one of Australia's big things. One of its attractions is Wildlife HQ, a zoo with hundreds of animal species including a large collection of primates. It hosts a number of music festivals including Big Pineapple Music Festival. The complex is at 76 Nambour Connection Road (26.6722°S 152.9911°E).

Thrill Hill Waterslide Park is 74 Schubert Road (26.6647°S 152.9715°E).

== Heritage listings ==
Woombye has a number of heritage-listed sites, including:

- Paynter's Creek Roadside Rest Area, one of the North Coast Roadside Rest Areas, Nambour Connection Road (26.6556°S 152.9679°E)
- The Big Pineapple (formerly Sunshine Plantation), Nambour Connection Road (26.6708°S 152.9926°E)

== See also ==
- Blackall Range road network
