= Eudlo Creek National Park =

National park in Queensland, Australia

- IUCN category II (national park)
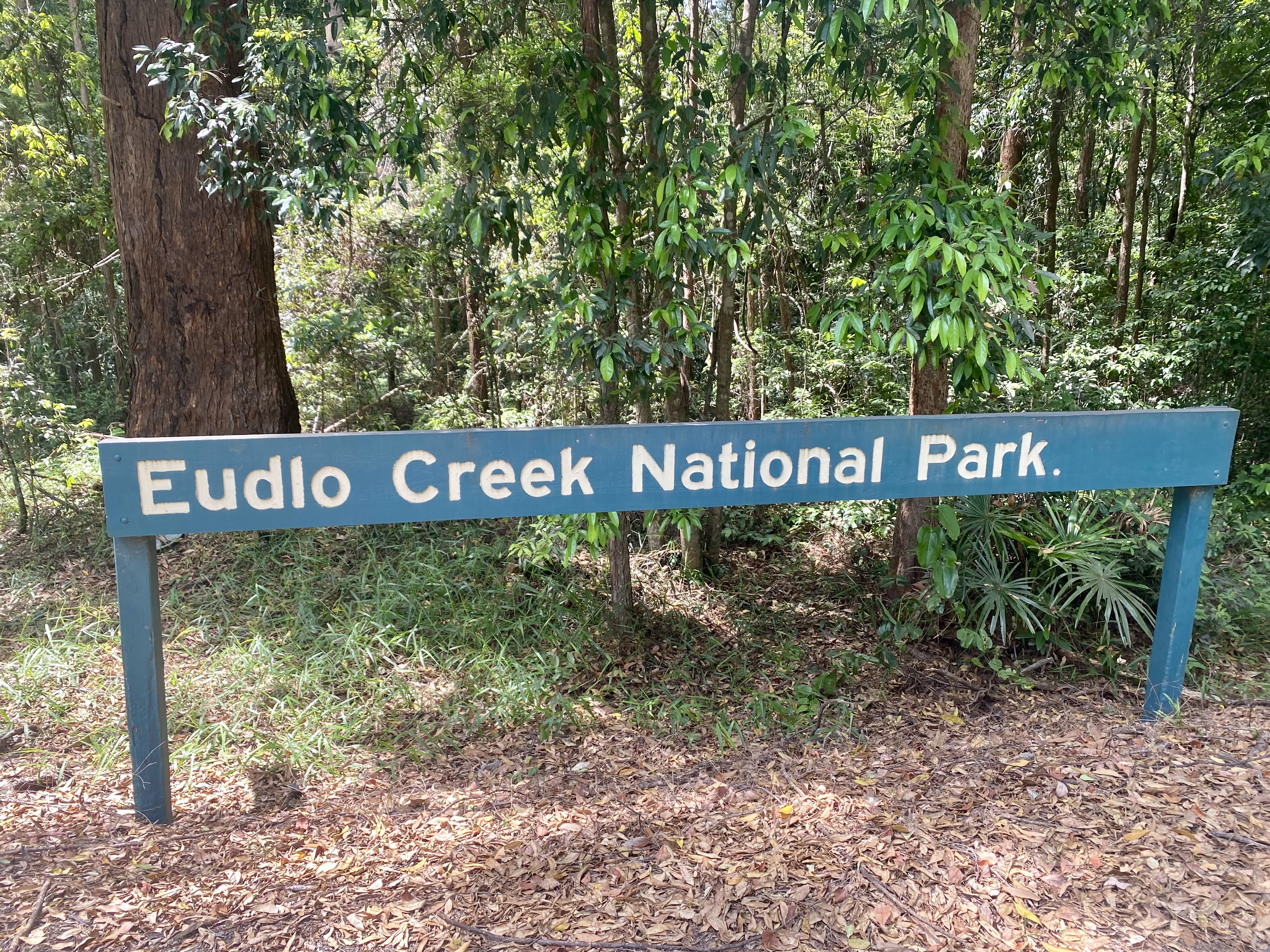
- Main Sign for Eudlo Creek National Park

- Location within Queensland
- Location: Queensland
- Coordinates: 26°42′25″S 152°57′43″E
- Area: 0.43 km^{2} (0.17 sq mi)
- Established: 1951
- Governing body: Queensland Parks and Wildlife Service

Eudlo Creek is a national park in the south of Palmwoods in the Sunshine Coast Region local government area of South East Queensland, Australia, 85 km north of Brisbane.

456 plant species were discovered in the park, 13 of which are on the list of rare or endangered species.

The vulnerable tusked frog has been identified within the park.

== See also ==
- Protected areas of Queensland
