= Estelle Thompson =

Australian crime writer

Estelle Thompson, c.1991

Estelle May Thompson (1930–2003) was an Australian crime fiction writer, author of 16 novels and one biographical memoir. Her crime thrillers have been published worldwide in hardcover and paperback, most also in large print editions, Braille and/or as audio cassettes. Five have been translated.

== Life ==
Thompson was born 9 October 1930 in Gympie, Queensland to Andrew Thompson, a dairy farmer of Irish descent, and his wife Lillias May (née Nahrung). She said that she wrote in her spare time whilst living on the family farm at Nambour near Brisbane.

Three of Thompson's novels where nominated for the Miles Franklin Literary Award: The Lawyer and the Carpenter in 1963; The Edge of Nowhere in 1965; and The Wrong Saturday in 1968.

Thompson's sixth novel, Find a Crooked Sixpence, was serialised in The Australian Women's Weekly.

Thompson's death on 28 May 2003 was reported in the Brisbane Courier Mail as "late of Dulong".

== Publications ==
- A Twig is Bent, Abelard-Schuman, 1961
- The Lawyer and the Carpenter, Hodder & Stoughton, 1963
- The Edge of Nowhere, Hodder & Stoughton, 1965
- The Glass Houses, Hodder & Stoughton, 1967
- The Wrong Saturday, Hodder & Stoughton, 1968, ISBN 0340044233
- Find a Crooked Sixpence, Hodder & Stoughton, 1970; Walker, 1977, ISBN 0802753663
- A Mischief Past, Hale, 1971, ISBN 0709121253
- Three Women in the House, Hale, 1973, ISBN 0709133677
- The Meadows of Tallon, Hale, 1974, ISBN 0709143745
- Hunter in the Dark, Walker, 1978; Walker & Co, ISBN 0802730701
- To Catch a Rainbow, Hale, 1979, ISBN 0709176341
- The Heir to Fairfield, Robert Hale, 1983, ISBN 0709005776
- A Bridge Over Time : Living in Arnhemland with the Aborigines, 1938-1944 from the memories of Harold Thornell, J M Dent, 1986, ISBN 0867700424; & Robert Hale, 1986, ISBN 0709026366
- A Toast to Cousin Julian, Hale, 1986, ISBN 0709026064
- The Substitute, Robert Hale, 1991, ISBN 0709047037; re-published as Death by Misadventure, St Martin’s Press, 1992; Worldwide, 1993, ISBN 0373280033
- Come Home to Danger, Robert Hale, 1998, ISBN 0709061617
- The Road to Seven-Thirty, Robert Hale, 2000, ISBN 0709066317

=== Translations ===
- A Twig is Bent

Was du nicht weisst, macht dich nicht tot, (German edition) Scherz, 1982, ISBN 3502508550
Le verger de la peur : roman, (French edition) Les Editions Mondiales, 1962

- The Wrong Saturday

De fatale zaterdag, translated into Dutch by J. C. Torringa-Timmer, Davidsfond, 1974, ISBN 9061520150
Lourd de menaces, translated into French by C. Wourgaft, Gallimard, 1970

- Three Women in the House

Tödlicher Hass : Roman, (German edition) Wilhelm Heyne, 1975, ISBN 345311129X

- The Meadows of Tallon

Eine feine Familie, translated into German by Ingrid Herrmann, Scherz, 1982, ISBN 3502508712

- Hunter in the Dark

Der blinde Jager, (German edition) Scherz, 1982, ISBN 3502508356
