= Curramore Sanctuary =

Nature reserve in Queensland, Australia

Coordinates: 26°38′58″S 152°42′30″E

Curramore Sanctuary is a 1.75 km^{2} nature reserve in south-east Queensland, Australia, 75 km north-north-west of Brisbane on the western edge of the Blackall Range. It is owned and managed by the Australian Wildlife Conservancy. It is mainly covered with rainforest and tall eucalypt forest.

== Fauna ==
Notable birds found on Curramore include the grey goshawk, red-browed treecreeper and sooty owl. Notable mammals include the grey-headed flying-fox.
