= Mapleton, Queensland =

Mapleton
- Town
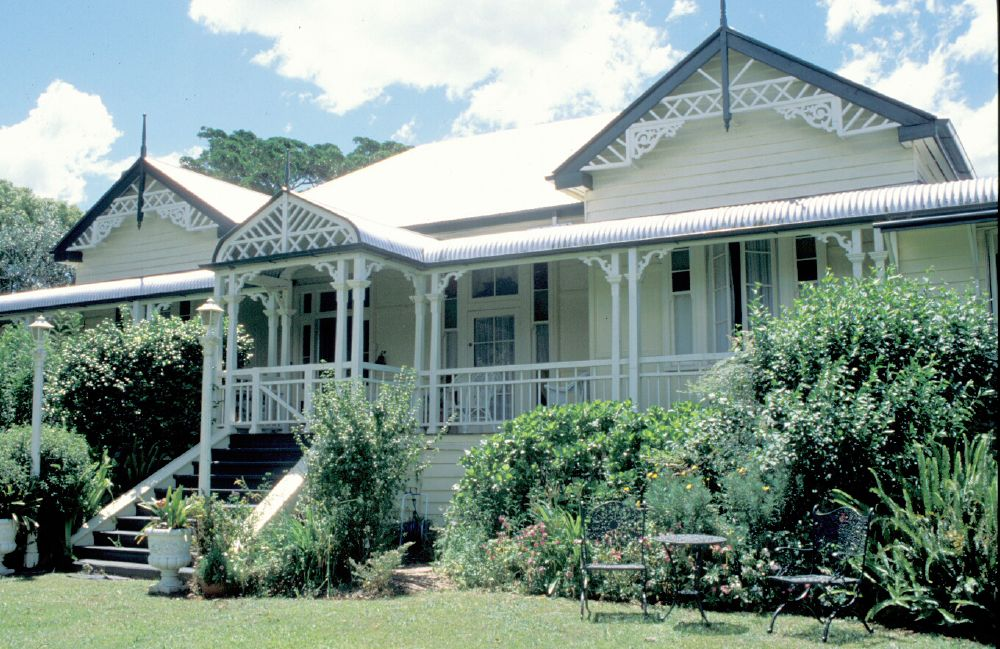
- St Isidore's, heritage-listed homestead, 1998

- Interactive map of Mapleton
- Coordinates: 26.6247°S 152.8666°E
- Country: Australia
- State: Queensland
- LGA: Sunshine Coast Region
- Location: 11.4 km (7.1 mi) W of Nambour; 26.6 km (16.5 mi) W of Maroochydore; 43 km (27 mi) NW of Caloundra; 107 km (66 mi) N of Brisbane

Government
  - State electorate: Nicklin
  - Federal division: Fairfax

Area
  - Total: 12.9 km^{2} (5.0 sq mi)
- Elevation: 400 m (1,300 ft)

Population
  - Total: 1,661 (2021 census)
  - Density: 128.8/km^{2} (333.5/sq mi)
- Time zone: UTC+10:00 (AEST)
- Postcode: 4560
Localities around Mapleton
| Gheerulla | Gheerulla | Kureelpa |
| Obi Obi | Mapleton | Dulong |
| Obi Obi | Flaxton | Flaxton |

Mapleton is a rural town and locality in the Sunshine Coast Region, Queensland, Australia. It includes one of Queensland's largest Outdoor Education Centres (QCCC Mapleton), the Lilyponds, and historic Seaview House (St Isidore's Farm College), and has panoramic views of the Sunshine Coast. In the 2021 census, the locality of Mapleton had a population of 1,661 people.

== Geography ==
The town is located on the Blackall Range in the Sunshine Coast hinterland at approx 400 metres (1,300 ft) above sea level.

Montville–Mapleton Road enters from the south, Nambour–Mapleton Road enters from the east, and Obi Obi Road exits to the south-west.

Mapleton Falls National Park is in the west of the locality and Kondalilla National Park is in the south of the locality extending into neighbouring Flaxton and beyond. Historically a rural area, the land use is now predominantly rural residential with some grazing on native vegetation.

== History ==
For countless generations, the Blackall Range has held spiritual significance for many Aboriginal people throughout South East Queensland. Abundant bunya pines growing throughout this area produced large nut crops, providing enough food for huge gatherings. When the nut crop peaked every three years, Kabi Kabi and neighbouring Wakka Wakka people hosted the Bonyee Festival. Many invited guests travelled great distances from coastal and inland areas to share food, songs and dances, arrange marriages, and other social interactions. A large grassy area near Baroon Pocket was an important gathering place.

Early settlers of the area grew fruit, vegetables and cereal crops. The first timber cutters extracted red cedar and beech timber taking it to Nambour.

Initially the settlement was known as Luton Vale until 1899 when the name was changed after the English town. The name of Mapleton was decided at a meeting of early settlers in 1894, with one of the group, W.J. Smith, having read about the English town of the same name. A postal receiving office was established at E.H. Biggs' Luton Vale Orchard in 1892. The area was officially named Mapleton, as a postal site, in 1894.

During the 1890s, the area continued to develop with farm selections being made for various orchards and plantations.

Mapleton Provisional School opened on 17 July 1899 with an initial enrolment of 15 students under teacher Lizzie Fitzgerald. It became Mapleton State School on 1 January 1909.

By 1909, a sawmill was operating in the town.

The Mapleton Methodist Church was officially opened on Sunday 11 July 1909 by the Reverend W. Stanley Bath. The church building was 20 by 24 feet (6.1 by 7.3 m) and built from hardwood that was cut at Mr Rosser's mill in Mapleton. The contractor was Mr W. Lanham. The church was located approximately at 21 Flaxton Drive (26.6252°S 152.86680°E). The church was still open in 1965, but, as at 2021, it is no longer operating and the building no longer exists.

Pineapples, dairying and small crops were the towns major industries until the late 1950s.

== Demographics ==
In the 2016 census, the locality of Mapleton had a population of 1,564 people.

In the 2021 census, the locality of Mapleton had a population of 1,661 people.

== Heritage listings ==
Mapleton has a heritage-listed site:

- St Isidore's (also known as Seaview House), 40 Post Office Road

== Education ==
Mapleton State School is a government primary (Prep-6) school for boys and girls at Flaxton Drive (26.6259°S 152.8658°E). In 2017, the school had an enrolment of 218 students with 21 teachers (14 full-time equivalent) and 14 non-teaching staff (8 full-time equivalent). It includes a special education program. The school grounds are large and include Baxters Creek and a new covered multi-purpose area, administration offices and resource centre which opened in December 2009.

There are no secondary schools in Mapleton. The nearest government secondary school is Burnside State High School in Burnside, Nambour, to the east.

== Amenities ==
The Mapleton Community Library is at 10 Obi Obi Creek Road (26.6246°S 152.8655°E). It is operated by volunteers.

Mapleton Post Office is at 11 Post Office Road (26.6226°S 152.8659°E).

== Attractions ==
The Mapleton Observatory is at the Mapleton State School. It is operated by volunteers and is open to the public.

Mapleton Falls National Park (formerly Mapleton Forest Reserve) protects rainforest remnants with bunya pines, piccabeen palm groves, tall open blackbutt forests and picturesque mountain scenery.

== See also ==
- Mapleton Falls National Park
- Nexus (Australian magazine), based in Mapleton.
- List of tramways in Queensland
- Blackall Range road network
