= Flaxton, Queensland =

Flaxton
- Suburb
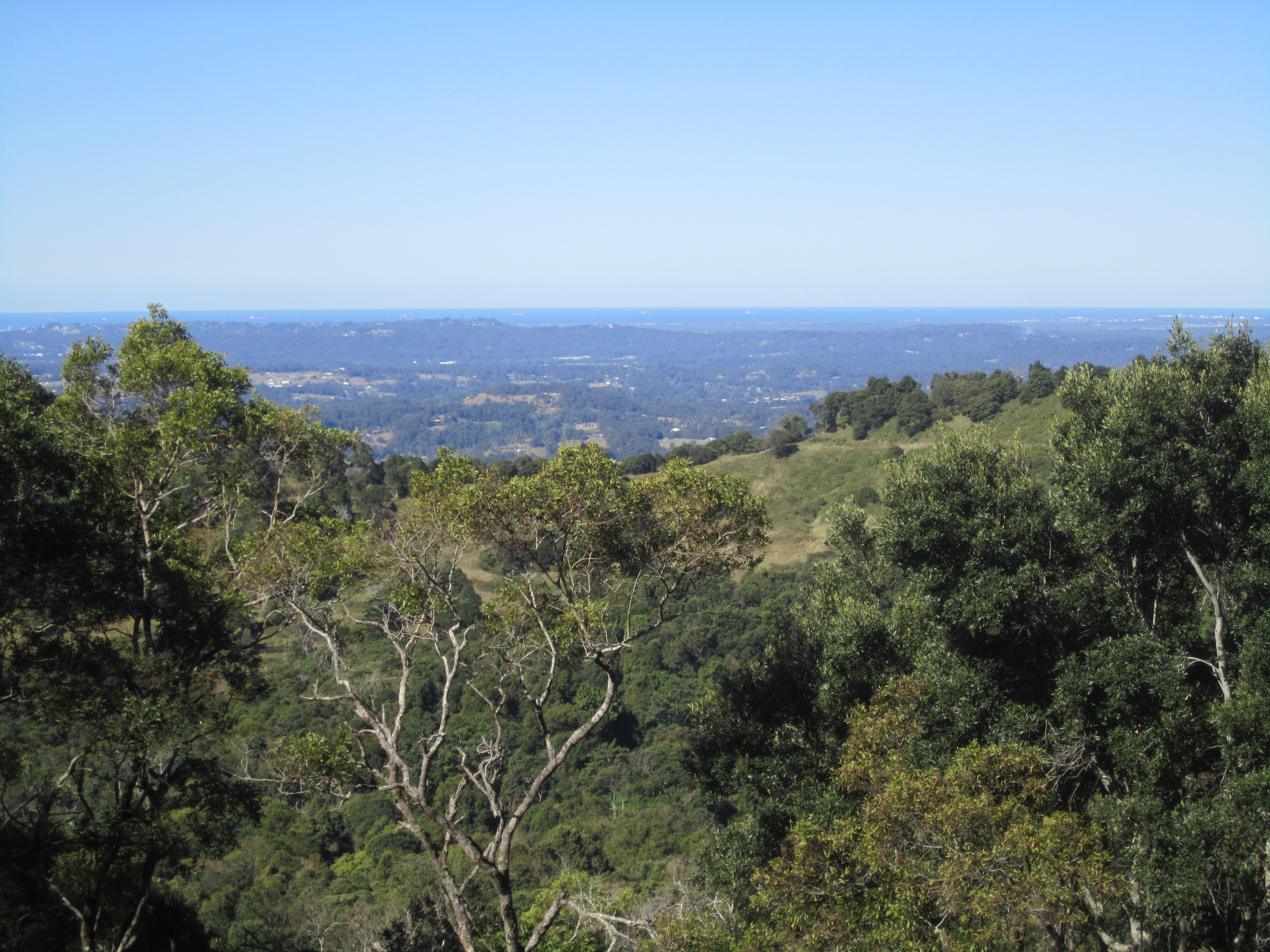
- View from Flaxton towards the Pacific Ocean, 2012

- Interactive map of Flaxton
- Coordinates: 26.6594°S 152.8691°E
- Country: Australia
- State: Queensland
- LGA: Sunshine Coast Region
- Location: 13.4 km (8.3 mi) WSW of Nambour; 28.2 km (17.5 mi) W of Maroochydore; 38.2 km (23.7 mi) NW of Caloundra; 105 km (65 mi) N of Brisbane

Government
  - State electorate: Glass House
  - Federal division: Fairfax

Area
  - Total: 11.6 km^{2} (4.5 sq mi)

Population
  - Total: 992 (2021 census)
  - Density: 85.5/km^{2} (221.5/sq mi)
- Time zone: UTC+10:00 (AEST)
- Postcode: 4560
Suburbs around Flaxton
Mapleton	Mapleton	Dulong
Obi Obi	Flaxton	Hunchy
Obi Obi	Montville	Hunchy

Flaxton is a rural locality in the Sunshine Coast Region, Queensland, Australia. In the 2021 census, Flaxton had a population of 992 people.

== History ==
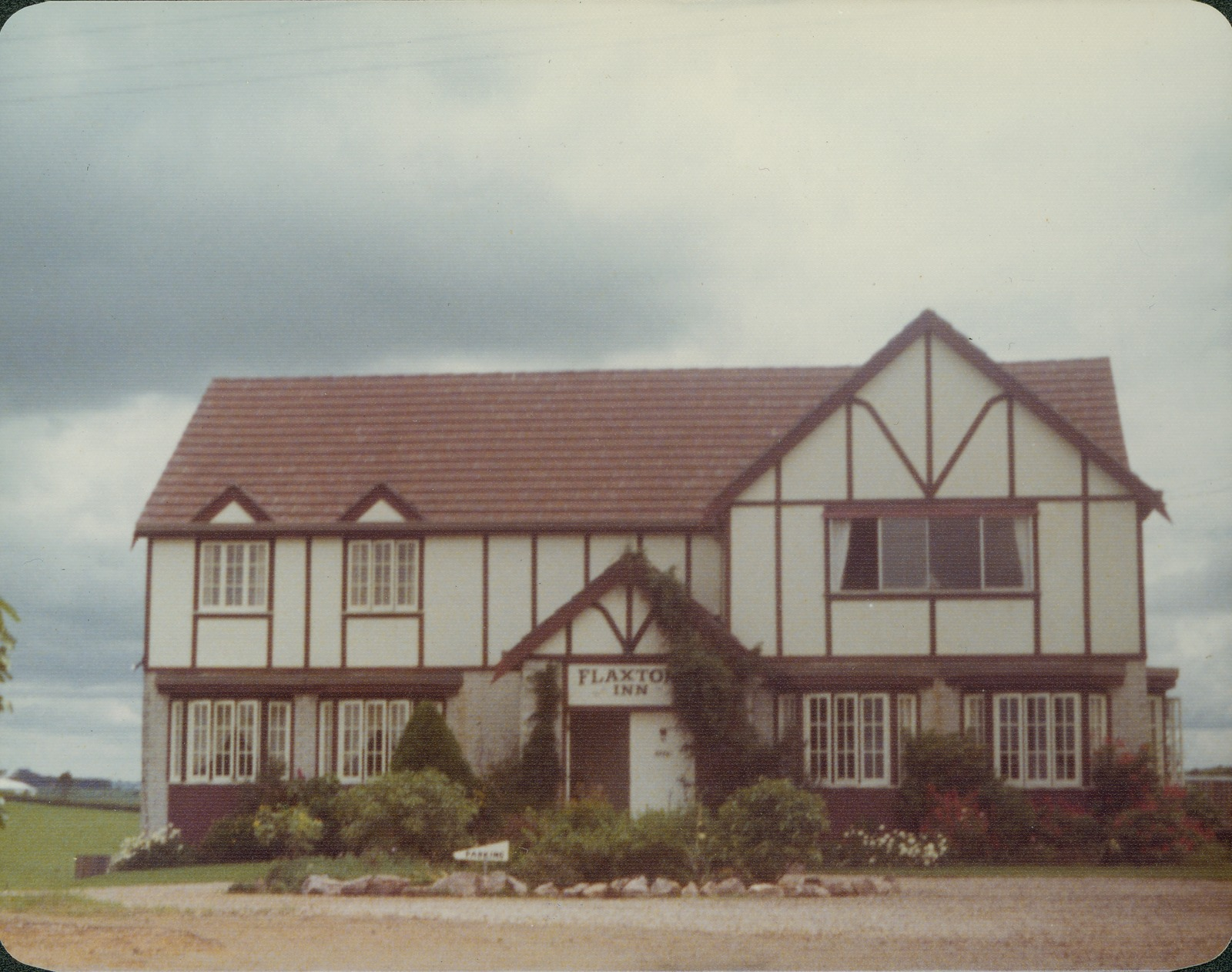
Flaxton Inn, 1976

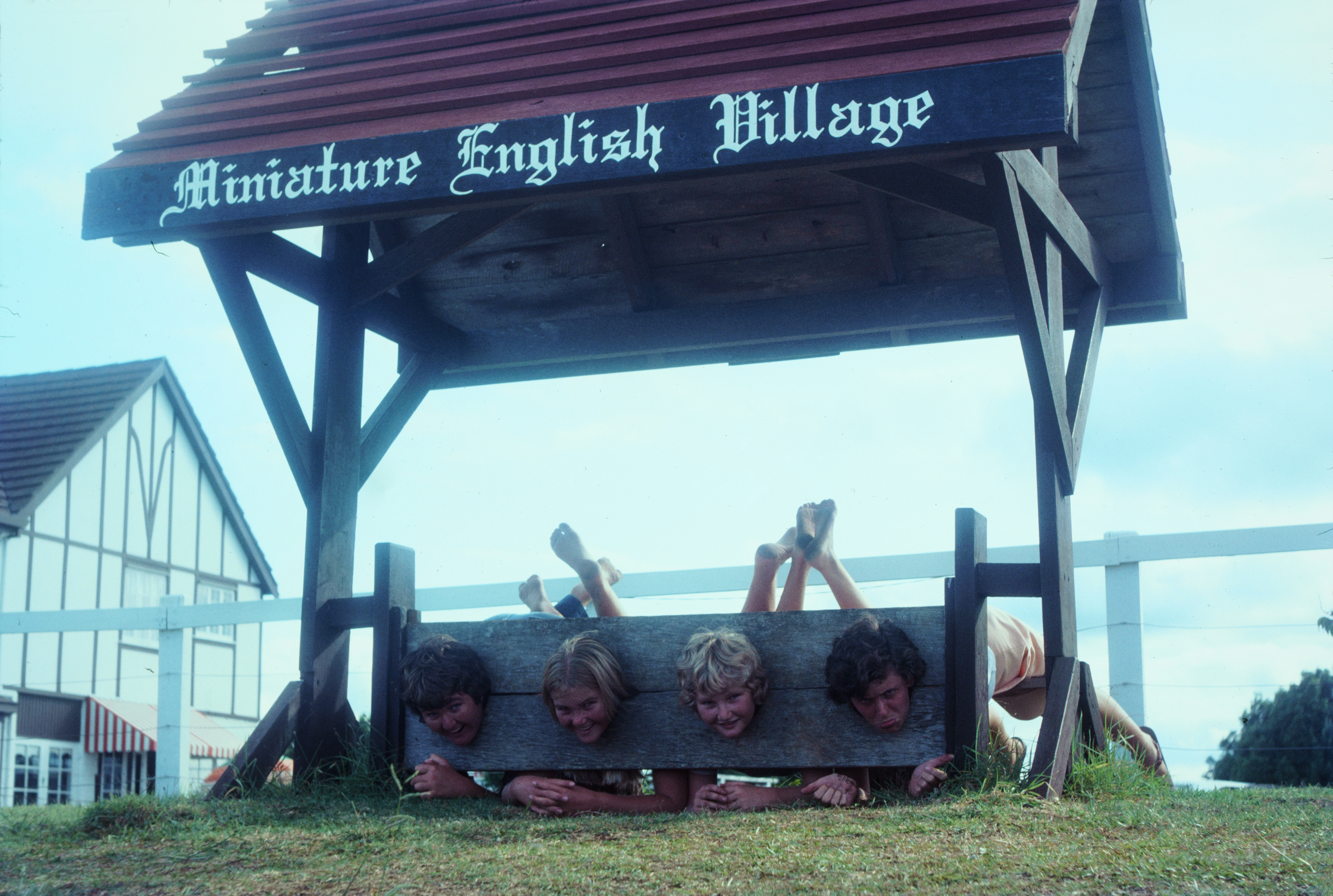
Life-sized stocks at the Flaxton Model Village, 1978

The locality is named after Flaxton Hall Farm in the fens of Eastern England. Joseph Dixon, who originally grew sugarcane at Buderim, selected land at Flaxton in 1882. From 1892 the land was cleared so bananas and citrus fruit could be farmed.

Local residents began to lobby for a school in 1921 with Mr J. C. Dixon senior donating a 1-acre (0.40 ha) parcel of land on the main range road with panoramic views to the coast. Having been advised that a state school built by the government would be unlikely, the residents decided to raise the funds locally to build a provisional school which could also be used as a public hall outside of school hours. A stump-capping ceremony was held on 8 October 1921. Flaxton Provisional School opened in February 1922. It closed in 1967. It was at 360-362 Flaxton Drive (26.65916°S 152.88194°E).

A fruit-packing shed which could process the district's entire harvest was opened 1931. A sawmill operated for more than 20 years before being burned down in 1956.

On 21 March 1970, the Minister for Tourism, John Herbert, officially opened the Flaxton Model Village display which was built and operated by Mr and Mrs Malcolm Bradley. The model village had one-twelfth scale replicas of old English buildings, including a castle, water mill, church, market square etc. There were also life-sized replicas used as a theatre, cafe, and shop etc.

== Demographics ==
In the 2016 census, Flaxton had a population of 931 people.

In the 2021 census, Flaxton had a population of 992 people.

== Education ==
There are no schools in Flaxton. The nearest government primary schools are Mapleton State School in neighbouring Mapleton to the north and Montville State School in neighbouring Montville to the south. The nearest government secondary school is Burnside State High School in Burnside to the north-east.

== Amenities ==
There are a number of parks in the area:

- Carramar Court Park (26.6512°S 152.8707°E)
- Cynthia Hunt Drive Bushland Conservation Reserve (26.6700°S 152.8755°E)
- Flaxton Drive Park (26.6596°S 152.8823°E)
- Flaxton Drive Natural Amenity Reserve (17.7726°S 101.9172°E)
- Nimbus Drive Park (26.6508°S 152.8733°E)

== See also ==
- Blackall Range road network
