= Montville, Queensland =

Montville
- Town
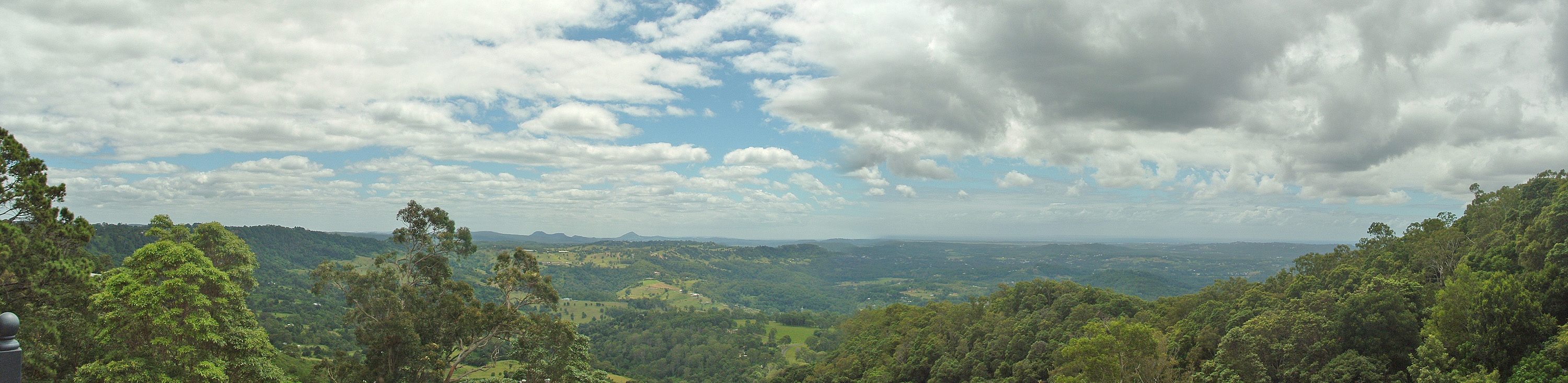
- Lookout from Montville

- Interactive map of Montville
- Coordinates: 26.6905°S 152.8933°E
- Country: Australia
- State: Queensland
- LGA: Sunshine Coast Region
- Location: 14.6 km (9.1 mi) NNW of Maleny; 16.6 km (10.3 mi) SW of Nambour; 97.8 km (60.8 mi) N of Brisbane

Government
  - State electorate: Glass House
  - Federal division: Fairfax

Area
  - Total: 17.6 km^{2} (6.8 sq mi)
- Elevation: 400 m (1,300 ft)

Population
  - Total: 1,092 (2021 census)
  - Density: 62.05/km^{2} (160.7/sq mi)
- Time zone: UTC+10:00 (AEST)
- Postcode: 4560
Localities around Montville
Obi Obi	Flaxton	Hunchy
Witta	Montville	Palmwoods
North Maleny	Balmoral Ridge	Landers Shoot; Eudlo

Montville is a rural town and locality in the Sunshine Coast Region, Queensland, Australia. In the 2021 census, the locality of Montville had a population of 1,092 people.

== Geography ==
Montville is in the Sunshine Coast hinterland, on the Blackall Range, around 400 metres (1,300 ft) above sea level in the town area.

Maleny–Montville Road enters from the south, Montville–Mapleton Road exits to the north, and Woombye–Montville Road enters from the east.

The north-west of the locality is within the Kondallia National Park which extends into neighbouring localities. Apart from the national park, the land use is mostly rural residential with some grazing on native vegetation and crop-growing.

== History ==
The first non-indigenous settlers arrived in the area in 1887. The town was originally called Razorback but was renamed following a community meeting. It is a coined word from mont meaning mountain and ville meaning village. The name may have been proposed by storekeeper Henry Smith (who bought a selection of land there in 1893) after a suggestion by his mother, as it reminded her of their early years in Montville, USA. The name was officially changed to Montville on 30 November 1897.

Razorback Provisional School opened on 2 October 1896. In 1904, it was renamed Montville Provisional School. On 1 January 1909, it became Montville State School.

From about 1900, the town became a popular mountain resort.

Montville Post Office opened by February 1910 (a receiving office had been open from 1897).

Montville Methodist Church was built in 1912. It could seat 110 people. It was built from timber at a cost of £230. In 1977 as part of the amalgamation that created the Uniting Church in Australia, it became Montville Uniting Church.

St Mary's Anglican Church was built in 1914. The timber church could seat 80 people.

The Montville branch of the Queensland Country Women's Association was formed in 1924.

Montville was predominantly a logging then farming community (dairy, citrus, avocados, pineapples and macadamia nuts) until a tourism boom which commenced during the 1970s, taking advantage of the scenic views of the Sunshine Coast and the nearby rainforest walks.

== Demographics ==
The locality of Montville had a population of 886 people in 2011, 970 people in 2016, and 1,092 people in 2021.

== Heritage listings ==
Montville has a number of heritage-listed sites, including:

- Montville Memorial Precinct, Razorback Road and Main Street (Montville–Mapleton Road) (26.6882°S 152.8927°E)

== Education ==
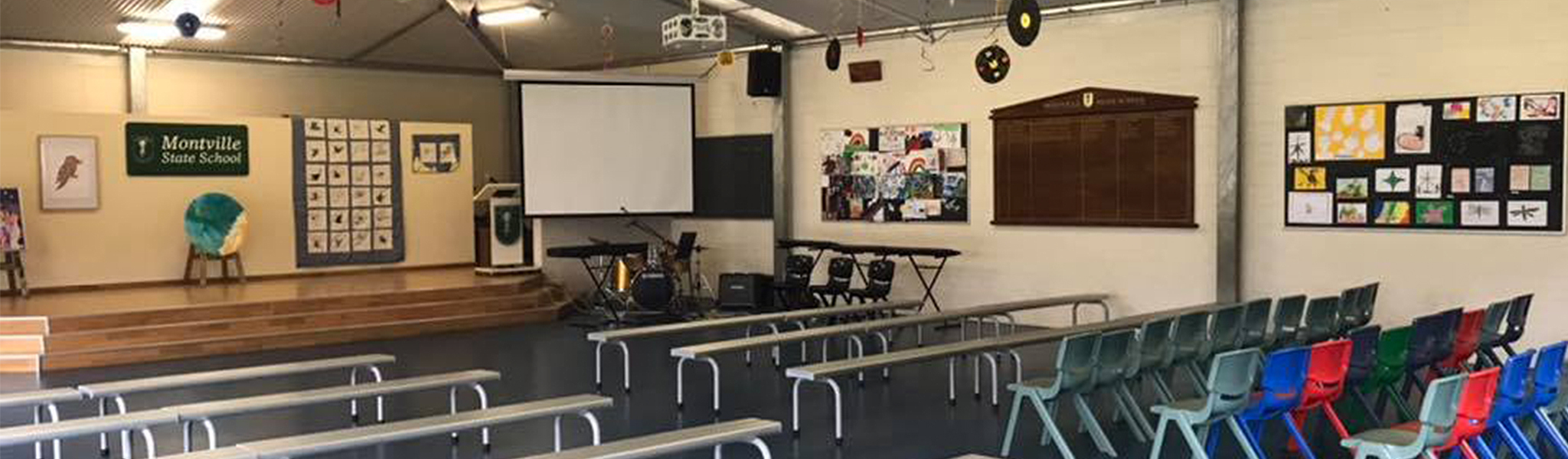
Montville State School, 2022

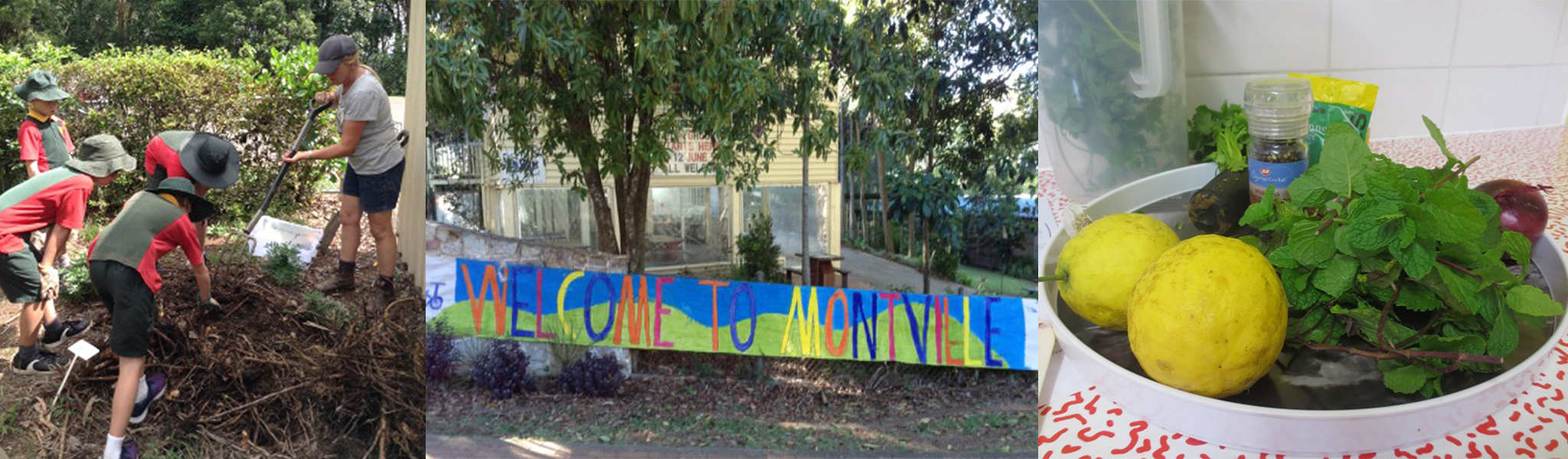
School grounds, 2022

Montville State School is a government primary (Prep–6) school for boys and girls at Main Street (26.6886°S 152.8930°E). In 2017, the school had an enrolment of 94 students with 14 teachers (7 full-time equivalent) and 9 non-teaching staff (4 full-time equivalent). In 2018, the school had an enrolment of 89 students with 11 teachers (6 full-time equivalent) and 8 non-teaching staff (4 full-time equivalent). It includes a special education program.

There are no secondary schools in Montville. The nearest government secondary schools are Maleny State High School in Maleny to the south, Burnside State High School in Burnside to the north, and Nambour State College in Nambour to the north-east.

== Amenities ==
The town is well served with facilities, including a multi-denominational wedding chapel, a village green and community hall and a large sportsground featuring a football field, tennis courts and a wood working centre.

St Mary's Anglican Church is at 9 Memorial Close (26.6881°S 152.8928°E).

Montville Uniting Church is at 152 Main Street (26.6894°S 152.8926°E).

The Sunshine Coast Regional Council operates a mobile library service which visits Main Street.

There are a number of parks in the area:

- Boongala Avenue Bushland Conservation Reserve (26.7010°S 152.9054°E)
- Flaxton Drive Natural Amenity Reserve South (26.6732°S 152.8775°E)
- Lot 22 Main Street (26.6884°S 152.8907°E)
- Montville Acres Park (26.7041°S 152.9009°E)
- Montville Village Green & T.H. Brown Park (26.6887°S 152.8927°E)
- Narrows Road Bushland Reserve (26.6927°S 152.8698°E)
- Russell Family Park (26.6913°S 152.8921°E)

== Facilities ==
Despite the name, Landers Shute Advanced Water Treatment Plant is a water treatment plant at 25 Mckillop Road in Montville (26.7183°S 152.9093°E). It is operated by Seqwater.

== Attractions ==
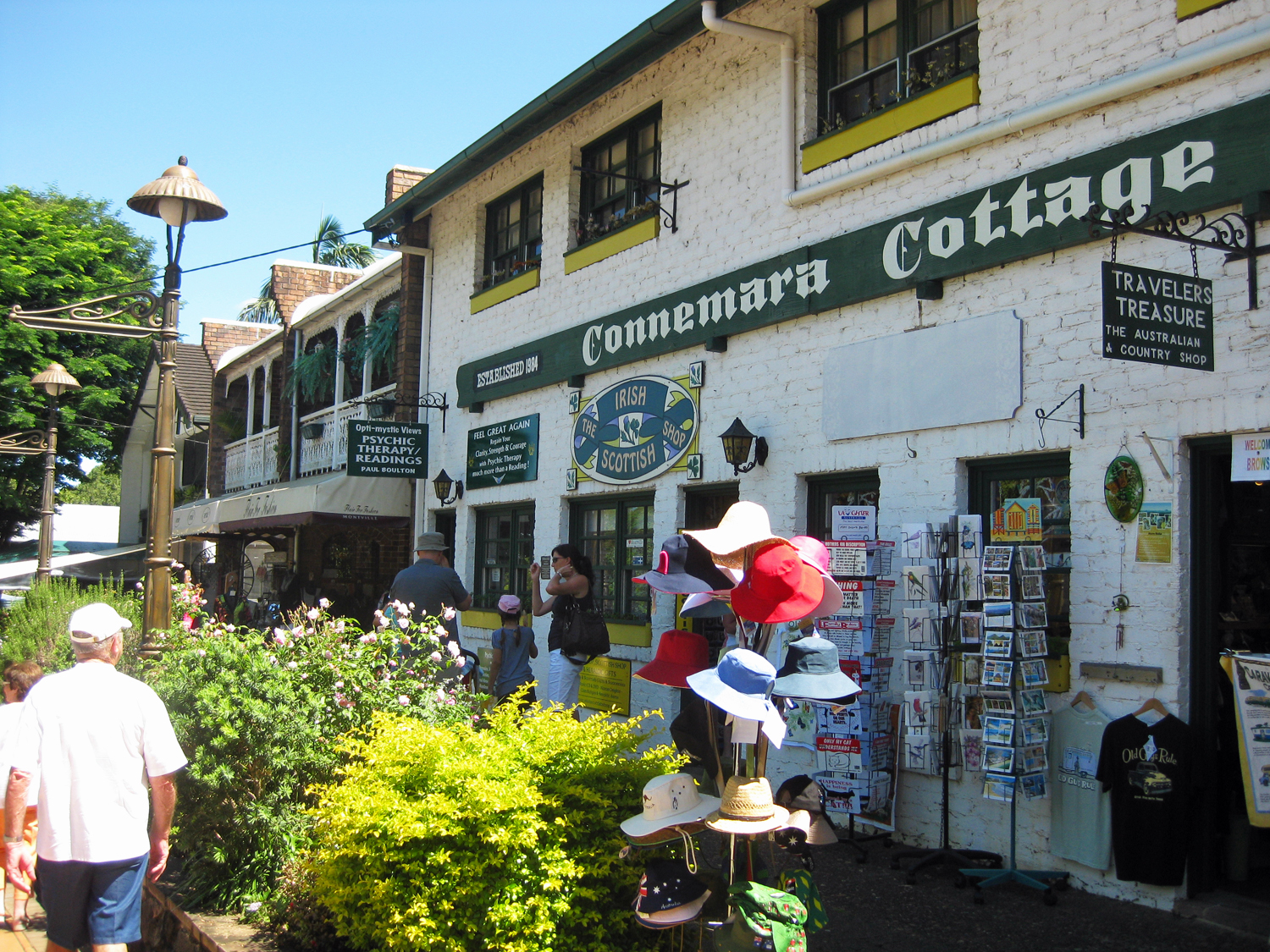
Shops at Montville

The village is now a popular short break tourist destination for the people of Brisbane and is famous for its parks and walks including the Sunshine Coast Hinterland Great Walks. Popular attractions include galleries, restaurants & cafes, wineries, clock shop, hand-made chocolate shop & cafe, and craft and clothing boutiques.

There are a number of parks in the area:

- Baroon Pocket Fauna Sanctuary (26.6772°S 152.8674°E)
- Crawford & Foster Lookout (26.6966°S 152.9059°E)
- Razorback Lookout (George Carpenter Lookout) (26.6884°S 152.8937°E)

There are two waterfalls:

- Elston Falls (26.6991°S 152.8966°E), south of the town
- Kondalilla Falls, formerly known as Bon Accord Falls, in within the Kondalilla National Park in the north-west of the locality (26.6733°S 152.8652°E)

There are many places to stay in and around Montville, with accommodation ranging from private cottages to resorts. Montville is becoming a very popular location for destination weddings at its many resorts, chapels, b&bs, wineries and restaurants.

Nearby attractions include:

- The Baroon Pocket Dam and Lake, which provides water for Caloundra and Maroochydore, as well as being a recreational facility, for boating, fishing and picnicking.
- The world-renowned Australia Zoo which is a 20-minute drive down the range at nearby Beerwah.

== In popular culture ==
Montville was the setting for Eleanor Dark's 1959 novel Lantana Lane.

== See also ==
- Blackall Range road network
