= Dulong, Queensland =

Dulong
- Suburb
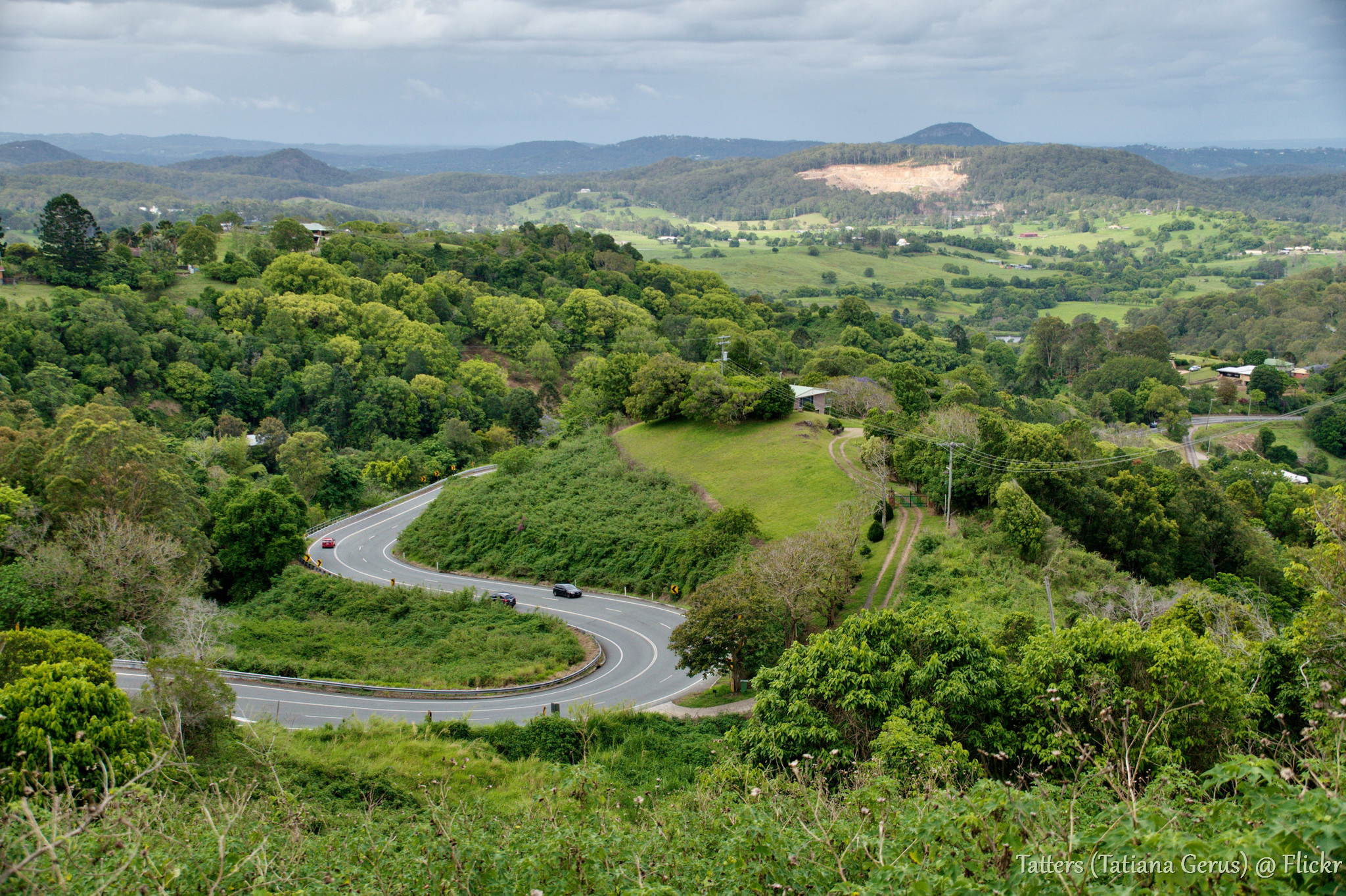
- View from Dulong Lookout, 2017

- Interactive map of Dulong
- Coordinates: 26.64°S 152.8927°E
- Country: Australia
- State: Queensland
- LGA: Sunshine Coast Region
- Location: 9.0 km (5.6 mi) W of Nambour; 25.1 km (15.6 mi) W of Maroochydore; 38.3 km (23.8 mi) NW of Caloundra; 114 km (71 mi) N of Brisbane

Government
  - State electorate: Nicklin
  - Federal division: Fairfax

Area
  - Total: 11.2 km^{2} (4.3 sq mi)

Population
  - Total: 688 (2021 census)
  - Density: 61.4/km^{2} (159.1/sq mi)
- Time zone: UTC+10:00 (AEST)
- Postcode: 4560
Suburbs around Dulong
Mapleton	Kureelpa	Perwillowen
Mapleton	Dulong	Towen Mountain
Flaxton	Hunchy	West Woombye

Dulong is a rural locality in the Sunshine Coast Region, Queensland, Australia. As of the 2021 census, Dulong had a population of 688 people.

== Geography ==
The land use is a mixture of rural residential housing developments and grazing on native vegetation. There is a quarry from which basalt rock is extracted for constructing roads and drainage.

== History ==
The name Dulong is believed to be an Aboriginal word meaning "mud" or "wet clay".

Dulong Provisional School opened on 8 July 1895 and became Dulong State School on 1 January 1909. It closed in 1929 due to low local attendance but reopened in 1930. It permanently closed in 1967. The school was located at the north-west corner of the intersection of Dulong School Road and Sherwell Road (26.6361°S 152.8861°E).

== Demographics ==
In the 2016 census, Dulong had a population of 564 people.

In the 2021 census, Dulong had a population of 688 people.

== Education ==
There are no schools in Dulong. The nearest government primary schools are Mapleton State School in neighbouring Mapleton to the north-west and Burnside State School in Burnside to the east. The nearest government secondary school is Burnside State High School, also in Burnside.

== Attractions ==
Despite the name, the Dulong Lookout is on Dulong Road just beyond the boundaries of the locality on the boundary of Kureelpa and Burnside (26.6264°S 152.9127°E). The view to the east overlooks Burnside, Nambour, and beyond to the Coral Sea.

== Notable residents ==
- Estelle Thompson – crime novelist
