= Palmwoods, Queensland =

Palmwoods
- Town
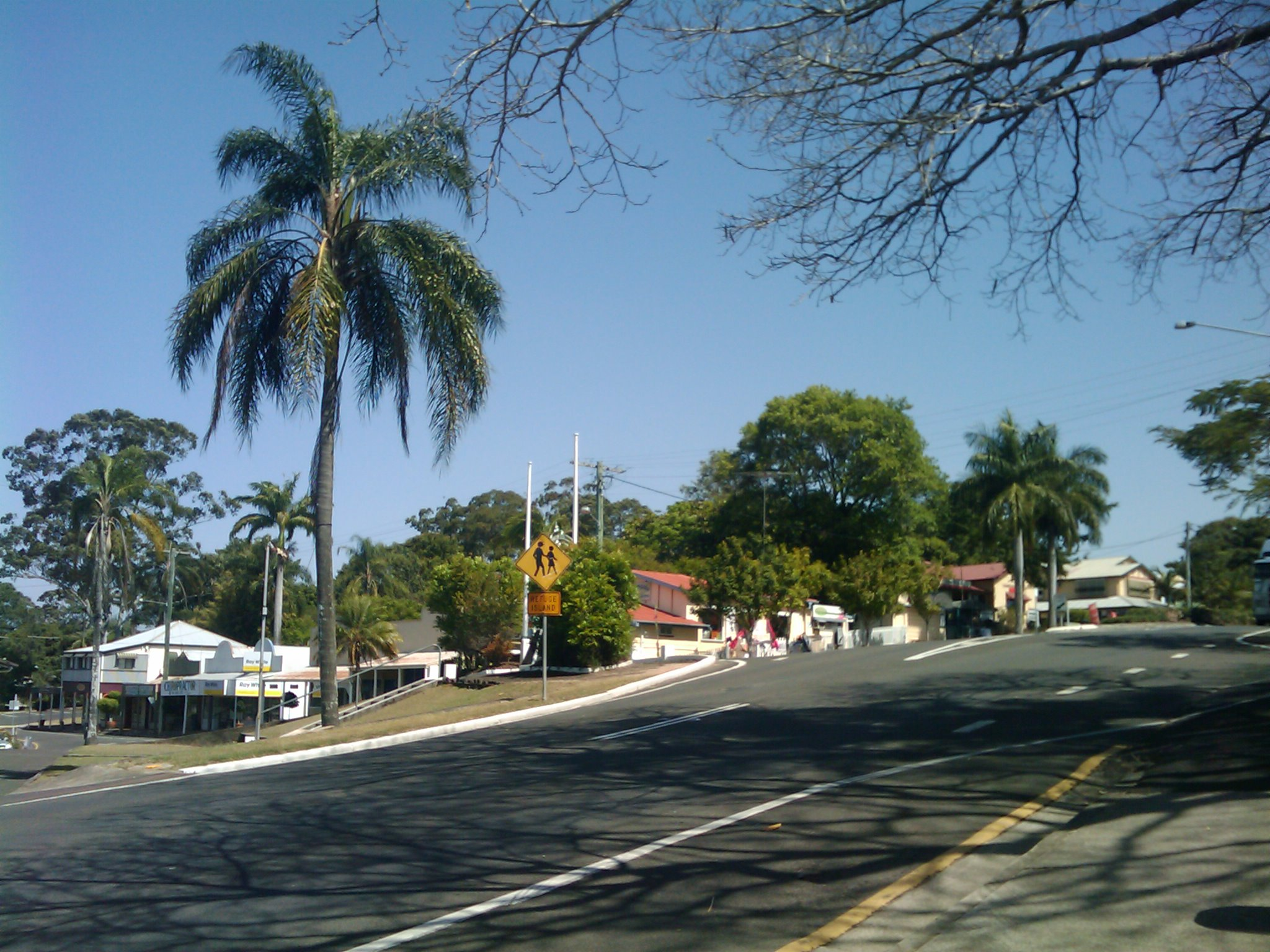
- Margaret Street, Palmwoods, 2009

- Interactive map of Palmwoods
- Coordinates: 26.6883°S 152.9597°E
- Country: Australia
- State: Queensland
- City: Sunshine Coast
- LGA: Sunshine Coast Region
- Location: 8.4 km (5.2 mi) S of Nambour; 16.1 km (10.0 mi) WSW of Maroochydore; 27.0 km (16.8 mi) NW of Caloundra; 103 km (64 mi) N of Brisbane

Government
  - State electorates: Nicklin; Glass House
  - Federal division: Fisher

Area
  - Total: 23.9 km^{2} (9.2 sq mi)

Population
  - Total: 6,357 (2021 census)
  - Density: 266.0/km^{2} (688.9/sq mi)
- Time zone: UTC+10:00 (AEST)
- Postcode: 4555
Localities around Palmwoods
| West Woombye | Woombye | Woombye |
| Hunchy | Palmwoods | Chevallum |
| Montville | Landers Shoot; Eudlo | Ilkley |

Palmwoods is a rural town and locality in the Sunshine Coast Region, Queensland, Australia. In the 2021 census, the locality of Palmwoods had a population of 6,357 people.

== Geography ==
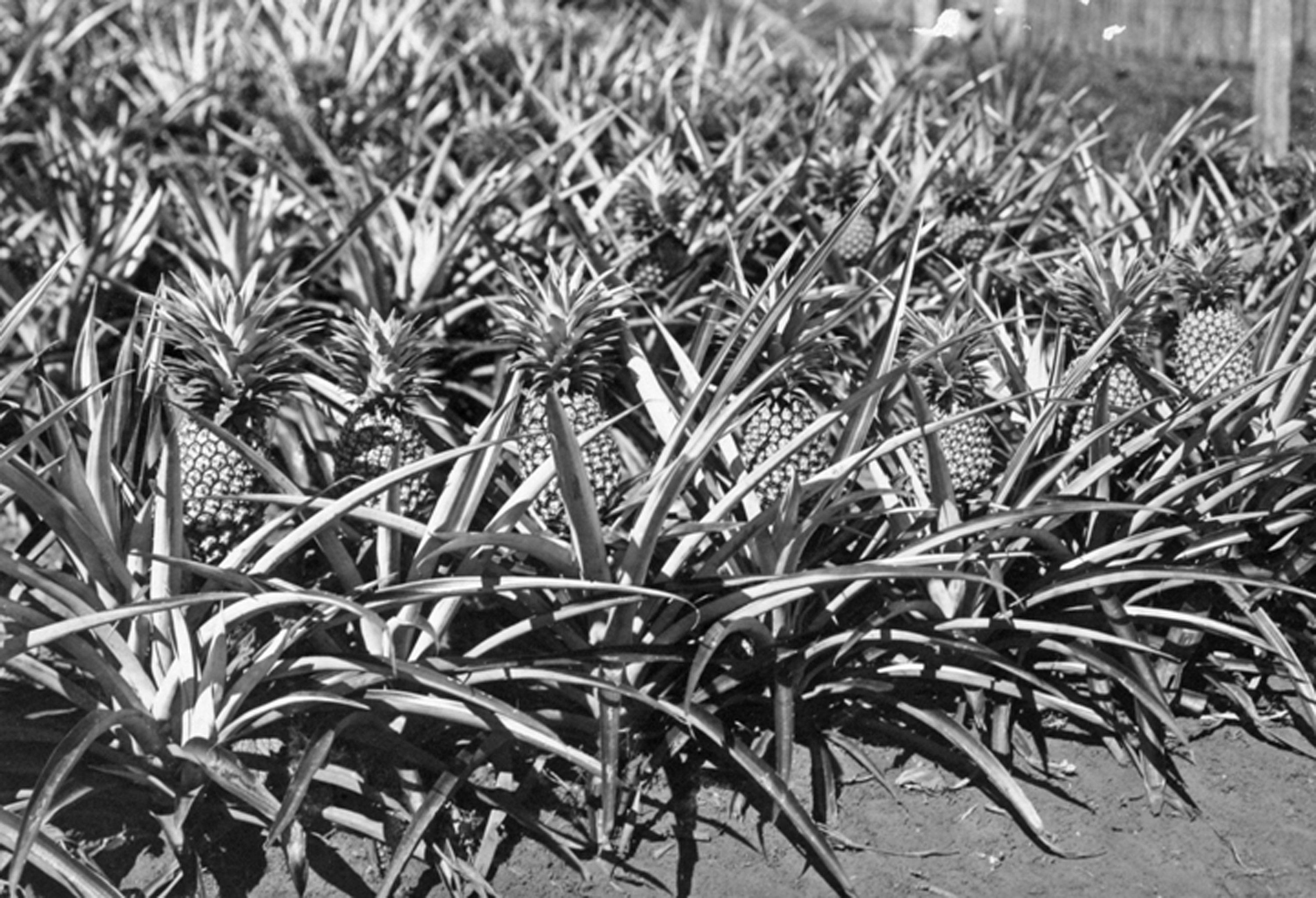
Pineapples growing at Palmwoods, 1928

Palmwoods is part of the Sunshine Coast situated near Nambour. Palmwoods is located 15 minutes from the beach and the Blackall Range.

The North Coast railway line enters the locality from the south (Eudlo), passes through the town, and exits to the north-west (Woombye). The town is served by the Palmwoods railway station (26.6887°S 152.9607°E).

Pineapple growing remains the most important primary industry in the area.

Eudlo Creek National Park is in the south-east of the locality. It is a conservation site providing habitat for threatened plants and animal species.

== History ==
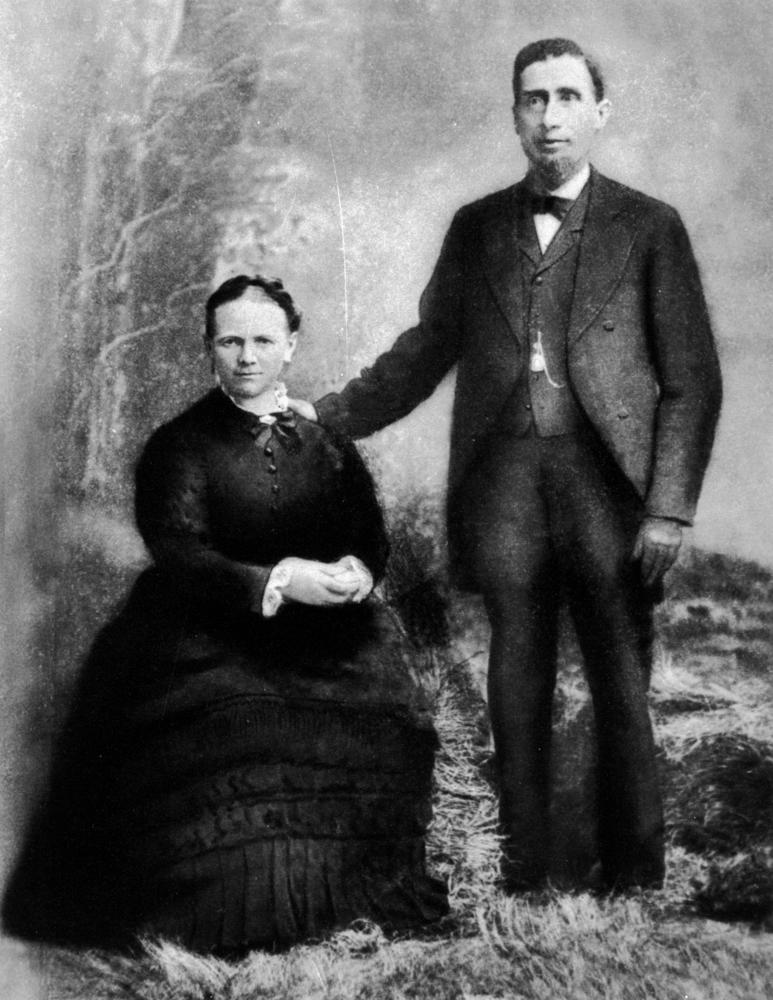
Early residents Peter and Catharine Kuskopf, 1879

The small town was previously named Merriman Flats in 1881 by the Kuskopfs who were early European settlers in the area.

Palmwoods Provisional School opened on 21 October 1889. On 1 January 1909, it became Palmwoods State School. A preschool was added in 1985.

Palmwoods railway station opened in 1891 leading to the nearby town to be renamed Palmwoods after the Piccabeen Palm groves growing in the area.

Palmwoods Post Office opened by 1902 (a receiving office had been open from 1892).

Palmwoods Union Church opened in 1903. It was built from timber.

From 1915 to 1935, the Palmwoods-Buderim tramway connected Palmwoods to Buderim for the transport of passengers and goods.

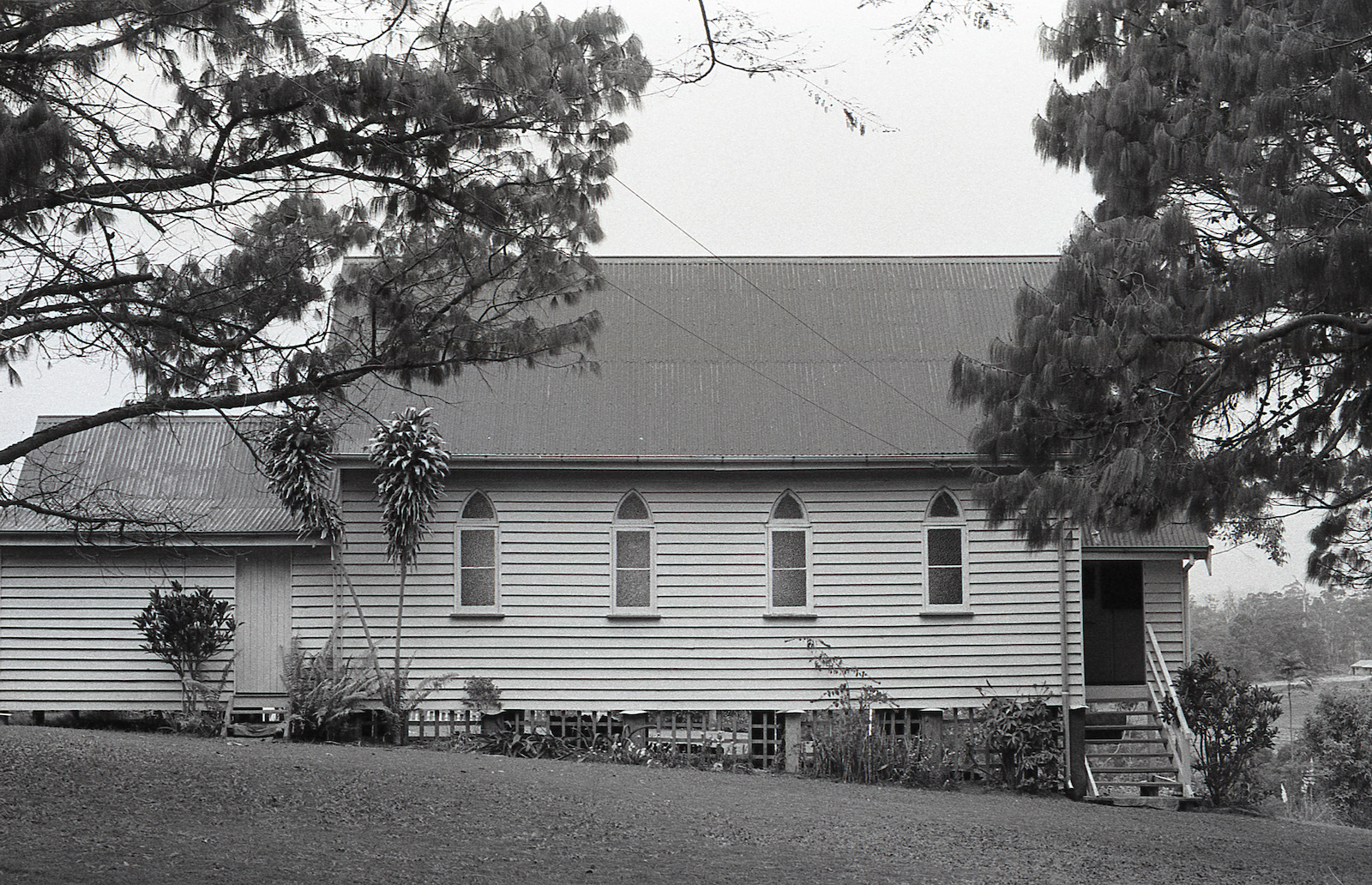
Palmwoods Presbyterian Church, 1975

Palmwoods Presbyterian Church was opened on Saturday 1 November 1924 by the Reverend James Gibson, the Moderator of the Queensland Presbyterian Assembly. Built from timber, it was the first church to open in Palmwoods. It was built using funds raised almost entirely by the local Women's Guild. It has subsequently closed and was demolished after 1975.

St Augustine of Canterbury Anglican church was opened and dedicated on Saturday 23 May 1925 by the Archbishop of Brisbane, Gerald Sharp. It was built from timber and fibro-cement at a cost of £435 and could seat 100 people. It was designed and built by Vincent Batt of Palmwoods.

Palmwoods Methodist Church was built from timber in 1928. It was 40 by 32 feet (12.2 by 9.8 m) with a 14-by-20-foot (4.3 by 6.1 m) vestry and a front porch. It was officially opened on Friday 2 November 1928 by Reverend Charles Columbus Truman, President of the Queensland Methodist Synod. In 1977, it become the Palmwoods Uniting Church when the Methodist church entered into the amalgamation which formed the Uniting Church in Australia.

Immaculate Conception Catholic Church was officially opened by Monsignor James Byrne on Sunday 30 May 1926. It was built from timber and was designed by Cavanagh & Cavanagh. It was sold in 1977. It was at 3 Briggs Street (26.685188°S 152.9589°E).

== Demographics ==
In the 2011 census, the locality of Palmwoods had a population of 5,492 people.

In the 2016 census, the locality of Palmwoods had a population of 5,676 people.

In the 2021 census, the locality of Palmwoods had a population of 6,357 people.

== Heritage listings ==
Palmwoods has a number of heritage-listed sites, including:

- Palmwoods-Buderim Tramway
- Second oldest surviving ES&A Bank and Bank Manager's residence

== Education ==
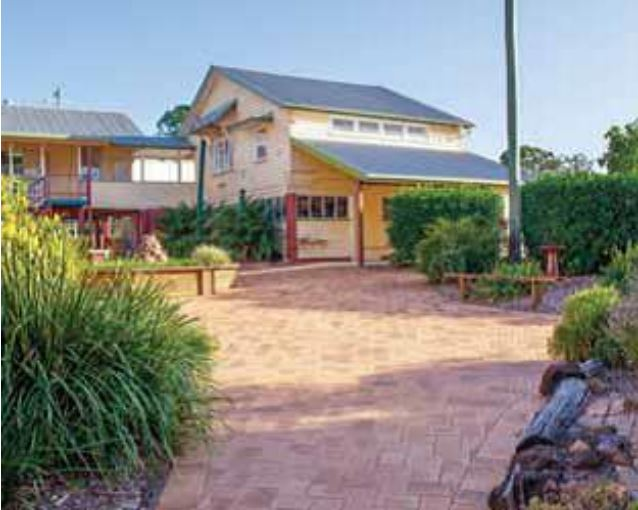
Palmwoods State School, 2017

Palmwoods State School is a government primary (Prep-6) school for boys and girls at 111 Palmwoods-Montville Road (26.6933°S 152.9467°E). In 2017, the school had an enrolment of 495 students with 40 teachers (37 full-time equivalent) and 23 non-teaching staff (13 full-time equivalent). In 2018, the school had an enrolment of 495 students with 44 teachers (37 full-time equivalent) and 25 non-teaching staff (13 full-time equivalent). It includes a special education program.

There are no secondary schools in Palmwoods. The nearest government secondary school is Nambour State College in Nambour to the north.

== Amenities ==
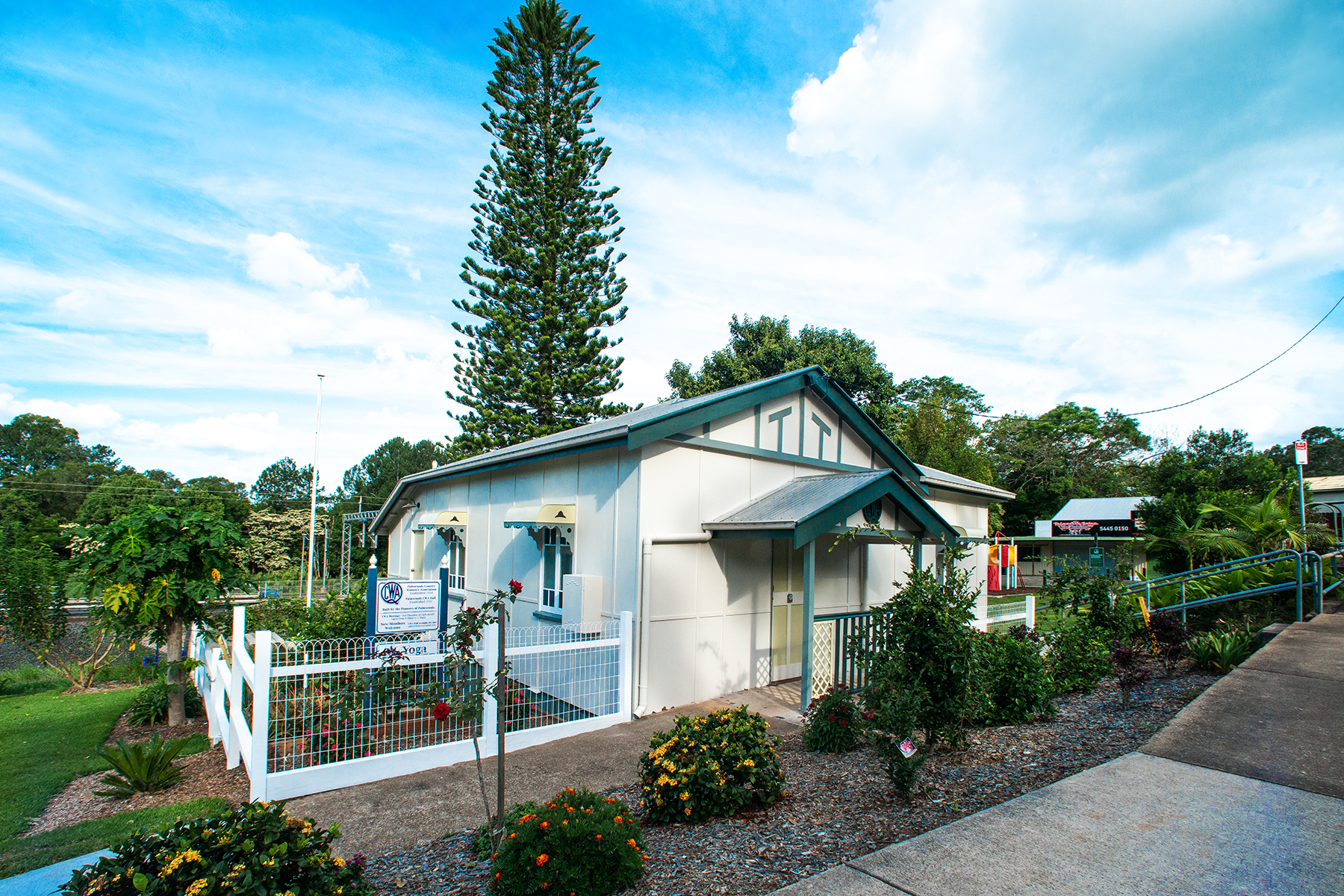
Palmwoods CWA Hall, 2020

The Sunshine Coast Regional Council operates a mobile library service which visits Main Street.

The Palmwoods branch of the Queensland Country Women's Association meets at the QCWA Hall at 11 Main Street.

St Augustine of Canterbury Anglican church is at 13 Hill Street (26.687884°S 152.9582°E). It is part of the liberal catholic tradition.

Palmwoods Uniting Church is at 10 Church Street (26.688861°S 152.9587°E).

== Attractions ==
Palmwoods is regarded for its various eating and drinking establishments. The Palmwoods Pub, built in 1902, has recently undergone a multimillion-dollar renovation, and is known for creating job opportunities for backpackers.
