= Blackall Range =

Mountain range in Queensland, Australia

Blackall
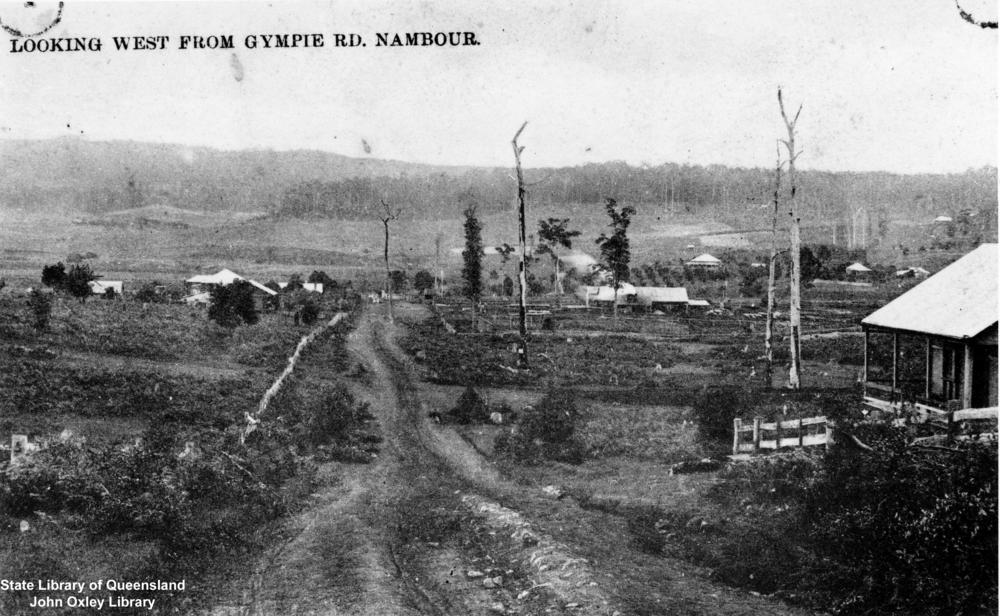
- Looking west from Gympie Road, Nambour, 1910. Looking west down Gympie Road, Nambour, to lightly cleared rural land and the Blackall Ranges.

Geography
- Country: Australia
- State: Queensland
- Region: South East Queensland
- Range coordinates: 26°42′S 152°53′E

Geology
- Rock age: Oligocene

The Blackall Range is a mountain range in South East Queensland, Australia. The first European explorer in the area was Ludwig Leichhardt. It was named after Samuel Blackall, the second Governor of Queensland.

The Blackall Range dominates the hinterland area of the Sunshine Coast, west of Nambour. Maleny, Mapleton, Montville and Flaxton are the main settlements located on the range. The Stanley River rises from the southern slopes. Baroon Pocket Dam is a reservoir on Obi Obi Creek which drains the north west slopes of the range.

Mary Cairncross Reserve marks the site of the first settler's house on the Blackall Range. Curramore Sanctuary, Mapleton Falls National Park and Kondalilla National Park are also located on the range. A number of lookouts on the range provide views towards the coast. One of these is located at Howells Knob, a mountain which rises 561 m above sea level.

Timber resources in the area attracted timber-cutters in 1860s. The last logging on the range occurred in 1939. The Blackall and Bunya Mountains ranges are the only two locations where the bunya pine species of tree is found naturally.

Activities by community groups with the support of the Queensland Government succeeded in recognising the range with iconic status, meaning the area is given greater environmental protection. In mid-2008, iconic status was confirmed, making the Blackall Range the third such declaration in Queensland after Noosa and Port Douglas.

== History ==
The Blackall Range is volcanic in origin and contains vast amounts of red basalt soils dating from the Jurassic period. It also takes its name from Samuel Blackall, the second Governor of Queensland.

Dalla (also known as Dalambara and Dallambara) is a language of the Upper Brisbane River catchment, notably the Conondale Range. Dalla is part of the Duungidjawu language region includes the landscape within the local government boundaries of the Somerset and Moreton Bay Regional Councils, particularly the towns of Caboolture, Kilcoy, Woodford and Moore.

== Roads ==
A group of roads provide access to the mountain localities and towns from various lowland places, and enable travel between the mountain communities. These roads ensure continuity of access in times of flooding or other natural disasters, and during planned maintenance activities.

== See also ==
- Glass House Mountains (Queensland)
- List of mountains in Australia
