= Burnside State High School =

Location
- Burnside, Queensland; Australia; 26.6302°S 152.9472°E

Information
- Type: Public school
- Motto: Smaller, Smarter, Safer
- Established: 1979
- Staff: 45
- Grades: 7–12
- Enrolment: 829
- Mascot: Easter Bunny Version of Lance Kimlin
- Website: https://burnsideshs.eq.edu.au

Burnside State High School is a secondary education institution in Burnside, Queensland, Australia, with 425 students (as of 2010) that caters for grades 7 through to 12. The school was opened in 1979.

== STEMM programme ==
Burnside State High School is a participant in the Supporting Teenagers with Education Mothering and Mentoring (STEMM) programme. STEMM enables a pathway for pregnant girls and young mothers to achieve educational goals as well as providing parenting support, mentoring and community access. STEMM offers a course in the fundamentals of literacy and numeracy for girls to achieve year 10 competency.

== See also ==
- List of schools in Sunshine Coast, Queensland
