= Obi Obi, Queensland =

Obi Obi
- Suburb
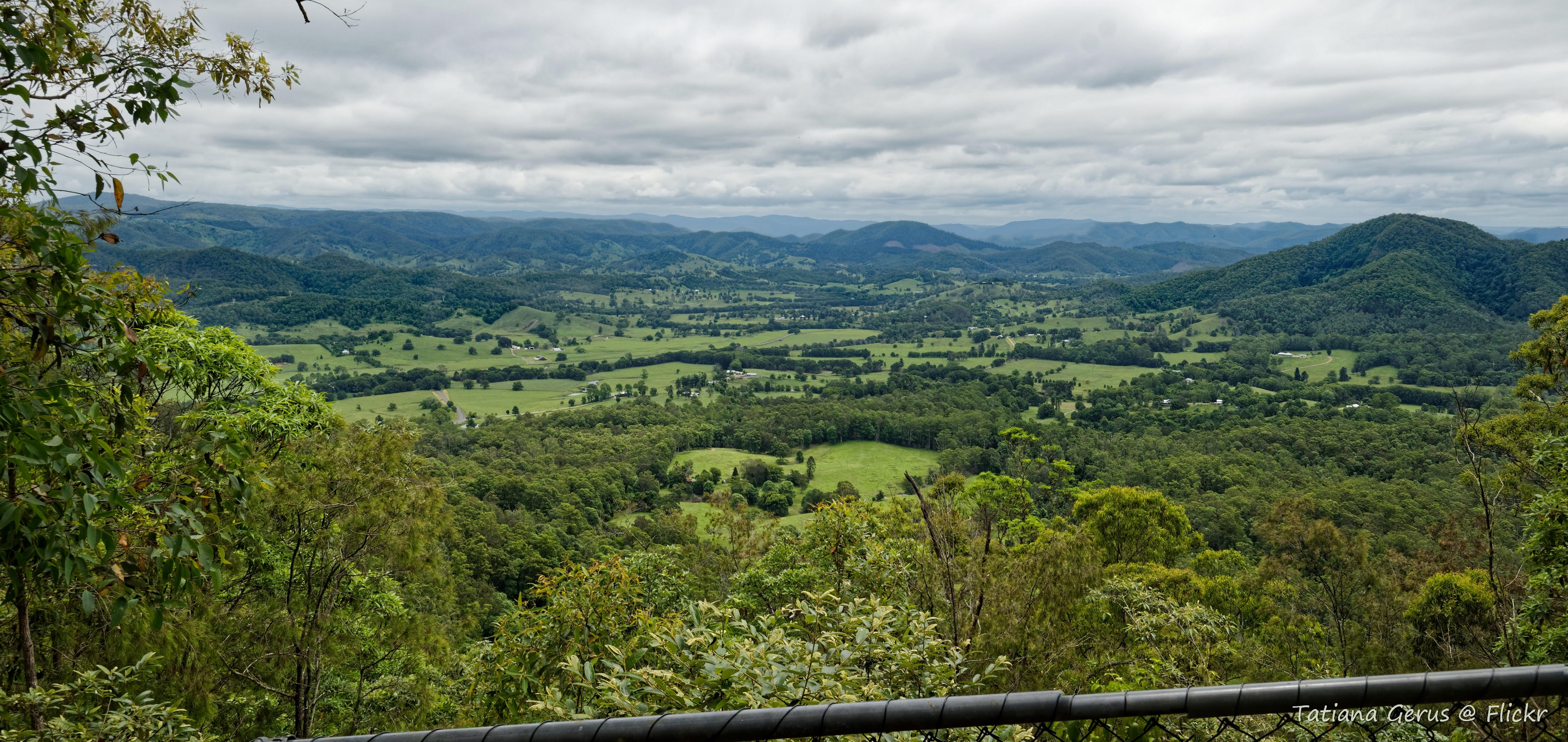
- Looking across the Obi-Obi Valley from Wayne's Lookout, 2020

- Interactive map of Obi Obi
- Coordinates: 26.6316°S 152.8261°E
- Country: Australia
- State: Queensland
- LGA: Sunshine Coast Region
- Location: 19.5 km (12.1 mi) W of Nambour; 19.9 km (12.4 mi) W of Burnside; 31.9 km (19.8 mi) N of Maleny; 51.2 km (31.8 mi) NW of Caloundra; 136 km (85 mi) N of Brisbane

Government
  - State electorates: Glass House; Nicklin
  - Federal division: Fairfax

Area
  - Total: 34.3 km^{2} (13.2 sq mi)

Population
  - Total: 208 (2021 census)
  - Density: 6.064/km^{2} (15.71/sq mi)
- Time zone: UTC+10:00 (AEST)
- Postcode: 4574
Suburbs around Obi Obi
Coolabine	Gheerulla	Mapleton
Kidaman Creek	Obi Obi	Flaxton
Curramore	Witta	Montville

Obi Obi is a rural locality in the Sunshine Coast Region, Queensland, Australia. In the 2021 census, Obi Obi had a population of 208 people.

== Geography ==
The suburb covers a large part of the Blackall Range. Large parts of the suburb are within state forest reserves. Obi Obi Creek passes through the suburb from east to west and forms part of the eastern boundary in the south.

== History ==
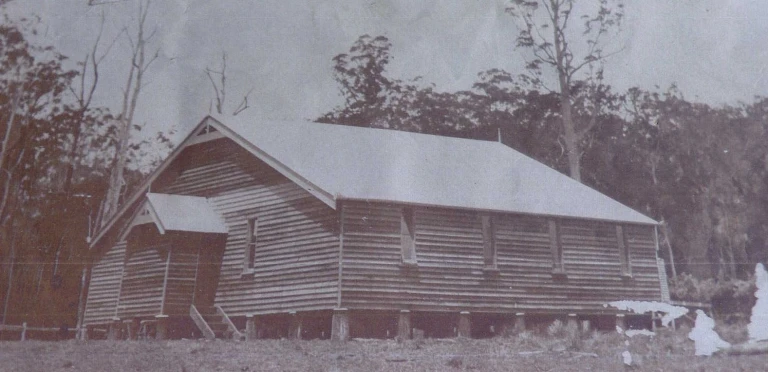
Obi Obi Public Hall, 1913

Obi Obi Provisional School opened on 11 November 1901. On 1 January 1909, it became Obi Obi State School. It closed on 5 July 1959. It was at 1-13 Pencil Creek Road (26.6362°S 152.8100°E).

The Obi Obi Public Hall was opened in October 1913 on land donated by A H Goths.

== Demographics ==
In the 2011 census, Obi Obi with neighbouring Coolabine and Kidaman Creek had a population of 427 people.

In the 2016 census, Obi Obi had a population of 211 people.

In the 2021 census, Obi Obi had a population of 208 people.

== Education ==
There are no schools in Obi Obi. The nearest government schools are Mapleton State School in neighbouring Mapleton to the north-east and Kenilworth State Community College in Kenilworth to the north-west. The nearest government secondary schools are Burnside State High School in Burnside to the east and Maleny State High School in Maleny to the south.

== Amenities ==
Obi Obi Public Hall is at 856 Obi Obi Road (26.64741°S 152.80907°E).

== Attractions ==
Wayne's Lookout at 419 Obi Obi Road (near junction with George Wyer Scenice Drive, 26.6434°S 152.8345°E) provides extensive views across Obi Obi.

== See also ==
- Blackall Range road network
