= Coolabine, Queensland =

Coolabine
- Suburb
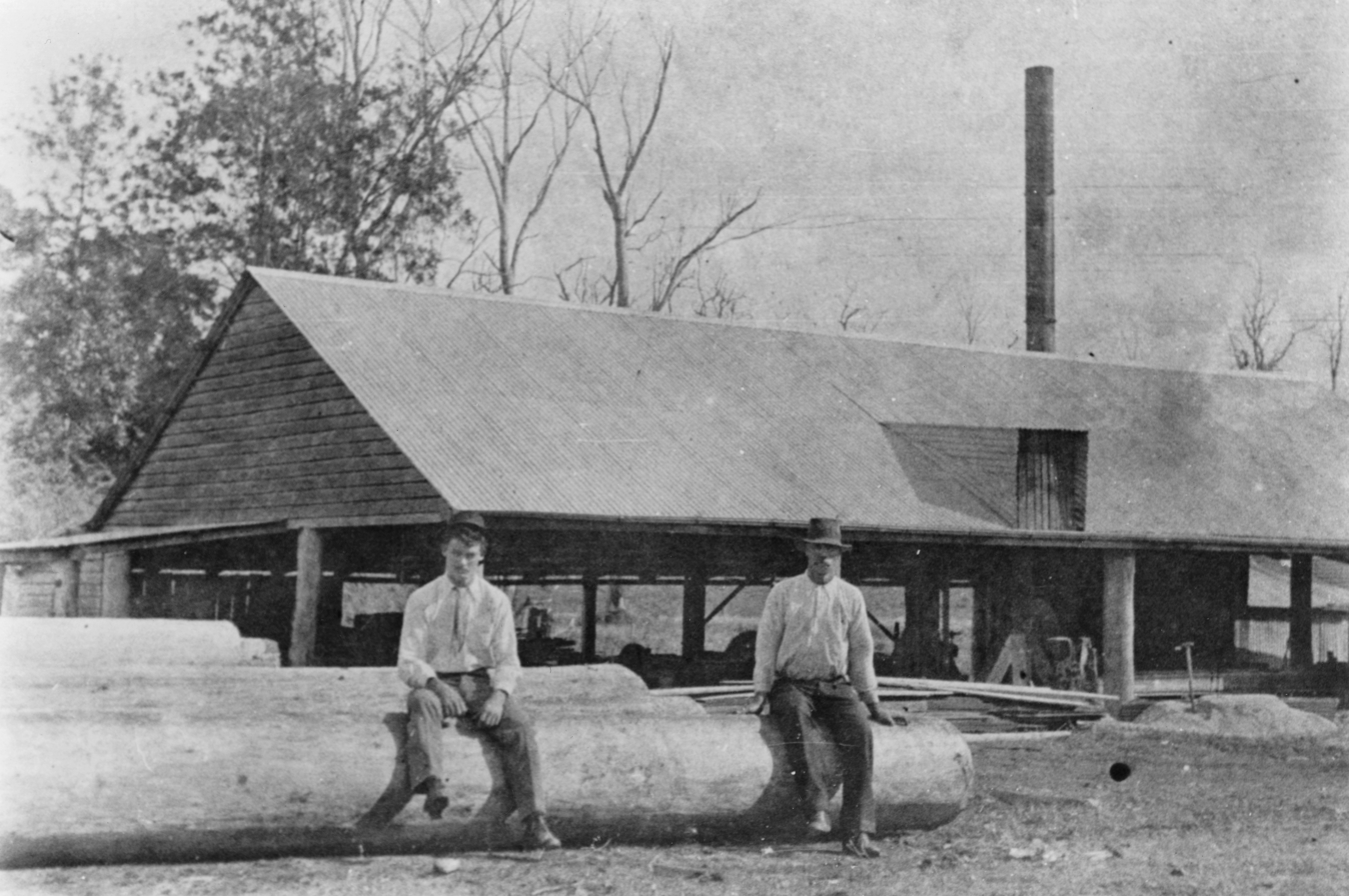
- Coolabine sawmill

- Interactive map of Coolabine
- Coordinates: 26.5983°S 152.7844°E
- Country: Australia
- State: Queensland
- LGA: Sunshine Coast Region
- Location: 27.2 km (16.9 mi) W of Nambour; 39.6 km (24.6 mi) NNW of Maleny; 59.0 km (36.7 mi) NW of Caloundra; 140 km (87 mi) NNW of Brisbane

Government
  - State electorate: Nicklin
  - Federal division: Fairfax

Area
  - Total: 12.8 km^{2} (4.9 sq mi)

Population
  - Total: 76 (2021 census)
  - Density: 5.94/km^{2} (15.38/sq mi)
- Time zone: UTC+10:00 (AEST)
- Postcode: 4574
Suburbs around Coolabine
Kenilworth	Gheerulla	Gheerulla
Kenilworth	Coolabine	Obi Obi
Kenilworth	Kidaman Creek	Kidaman Creek

Coolabine is a rural locality in the Sunshine Coast Region, Queensland, Australia. In the 2021 census, Coolabine had a population of 76 people.

== Geography ==
Coolabine is a locality in a valley (approx 100 metres above sea level) surrounded by mountains to the north, east and south, a range that includes Mount Thilba Thalba (450 metres in neighbouring Gheerulla) and Connors Knob (420 metres in neighbouring Obi Obi). It is locality is bounded on its west by Obi Obi Creek. Cooloobun Creek rises in the mountains to the south and then flows through the locality from east to west, joining Obi Obi Creek.

The land is freehold and rural residential in character.

== History ==
The name Coolabine is an Aboriginal word meaning "place of koalas".

F.W. Goeths opened a sawmill in 1911. It was known as the Coolabine Sawmills.

Coolabine Provisional School opened in 1928. It became Coolabine State School with the opening of a new building in February 1930. It closed about 1956. It was at 268 Coolabine Road (26.6022°S 152.7702°E).

== Demographics ==
In the 2011 census, Coolabine with neighbouring Obi Obi and Kidaman Creek had a population of 427 people.

In the 2016 census, Coolabine had a population of 71 people.

In the 2021 census, Coolabine had a population of 76 people.

== Education ==
There are no schools in Coolabine. The nearest government primary schools are Kenilworth State Community College in neighbouring Kenilworth to the west and Mapleton State School in Mapleton to the east. The nearest government secondary schools are Mary Valley State College (to Year 10), Burnside State High School (to Year 12) in Burnside, Nambour, to the east and Maleny State High School (to Year 12) in Maleny to the south.
