= Kidaman Creek, Queensland =

Kidaman Creek
- Suburb
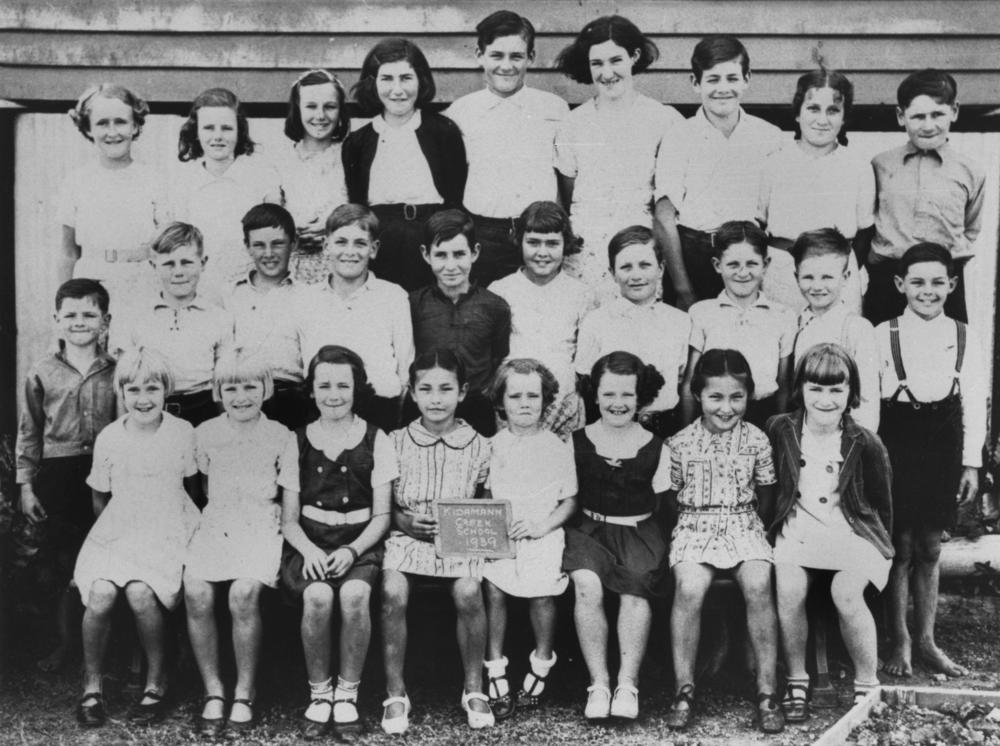
- Students at Kidaman Creek State School, 1939

- Interactive map of Kidaman Creek
- Coordinates: 26.6458°S 152.7722°E
- Country: Australia
- State: Queensland
- LGA: Sunshine Coast Region
- Location: 11.7 km (7.3 mi) SE of Kenilworth; 18.3 km (11.4 mi) NNW of Maleny; 28.5 km (17.7 mi) W of Nambour; 51.8 km (32.2 mi) NW of Caloundra; 120 km (75 mi) N of Brisbane

Government
  - State electorates: Nicklin; Glass House
  - Federal divisions: Fairfax; Fisher

Area
  - Total: 27.8 km^{2} (10.7 sq mi)

Population
  - Total: 125 (2021 census)
  - Density: 4.496/km^{2} (11.65/sq mi)
- Time zone: UTC+10:00 (AEST)
- Postcode: 4574
Suburbs around Kidaman Creek
Kenilworth	Coolabine	Obi Obi
Kenilworth	Kidaman Creek	Obi Obi
Curramore	Curramore	Curramore

Kidaman Creek (also written as Kidamann Creek) is a rural locality in the Sunshine Coast Region, Queensland, Australia. In the 2021 census, Kidaman Creek had a population of 125 people.

== Geography ==
Obi Obi Creek, a tributary of the Mary River, runs through the north-east of the locality. The creek Kidaman Creek (from which the locality takes its name) rises in the south-east of the locality and becomes a tributary of Obi Obi Creek in the north of the locality (26.6269°S 152.7686°E).

Despite the name, Kidaman Hill is not in the locality with slightly to the north in neighbouring Kenilworth (26.6156°S 152.7619°E). It rises to148 metres (486 ft) above sea level.

The land use is predominantly grazing on native vegetation with a small amount of crop growing and rural residential housing.

== History ==
Kidaman Creek was formerly a locality in Caloundra City and a district in Maroochy Shire.

Kidaman (or Kidamann) Creek State School opened in 1914 and closed about 1958. It was located near the junction of Obi Obi Road and Kidaman Creek Road (approx 26.63081°S 152.76746°E).

Kidaman Creek public hall opened in 1921 at 11 Kidaman Creek Road (26.6315°S 152.7674°E). It was destroyed in a storm in March 1995. A new hall was built, opening in October 1998. It was sold in April 2008 to provide funds to renovate the public hall at Obi Obi.

A postal receiving office opened on 20 November 1922 with a post office opening on 1 July 1927. The post office closed on 31 December 1930.

== Demographics ==
In the 2011 census, Kidaman Creek with neighbouring Obi Obi and Coolabine had a population of 427 people.

In the 2016 census, Kidaman Creek had a population of 130 people.

In the 2021 census, Kidaman Creek had a population of 125 people.

== Education ==
There are no schools in Kidaman Creek. The nearest government primary schools are Kenilworth State Community College in neighbouring Kenilworth to the north-west, Mapleton State School in Mapleton to the east, and Maleny State School in Maleny to the south-east. The nearest government secondary schools are Maleny State High School in Maleny and Burnside State High School in Burnside, Nambour, to the east.

== Amenities ==
Obi Obi and Kidaman Creek Community Hall is at 856 Obi Obi Road in neighbouring Obi Obi to the east.

There are a number of parks in the area:

- Bonney Park, Obi Obi Road, west of Obi Obi Creek (26.6356°S 152.7839°E)
- Obi Obi Creek East Park, Obi Obi Road, east of Obi Obi Creek (26.6360°S 152.7853°E)
