= Poona Dam =

Dam in southeast Queensland, Australia

- Location of the dam in Queensland
- Country: Australia
- Location: South East Queensland
- Coordinates: 26.596°S 152.910°E
- Purpose: Potable water storage
- Status: Operational
- Opening date: 1959; 1998 (spillway upgraded)
- Operator: SEQ Water

Dam and spillways
- Type of dam: Earth fill dam
- Impounds: Tributary of South Maroochy River
- Length: 650 m (2,130 ft)
- Spillway type: Uncontrolled

Reservoir
- Total capacity: 655 ML (531 acre⋅ft)
- Catchment area: 0.8 km^{2} (0.31 sq mi)
- Surface area: 17 ha (42 acres)
- Maximum width: 410 m (1,350 ft)
- Website seqwater.com.au

The Poona Dam is an earth-fill embankment dam with a toe drain with an un-gated spillway across a tributary of the South Maroochy River in Kureelpa, Sunshine Coast Region, Queensland, Australia. The main purpose of the dam is for storage of potable water for the Sunshine Coast region. The impounded reservoir is also called Poona Dam.

== Overview ==
The dam is located 7 kilometres (4.3 mi) north-west of Nambour.

The earthen dam structure is 650 metres (2,130 ft) long. The resultant reservoir has capacity of 655 megalitres (531 acre⋅ft) when full, covering a surface area of 17 hectares (42 acres), with a maximum width of 410 metres (1,350 ft) that is drawn from a catchment area of 0.8 square kilometres (0.31 sq mi). Initially managed by the Maroochy Shire Council, management of the dam was transferred to SEQ Water in July 2008 as part of a water security project in the South East Queensland region, known as the SEQ Water Grid.

=== Recreation ===
Recreation is not permitted on the dam and in its surrounds.

In 2008, the body of a deceased man was found on the eastern spillway of the dam wall.

== See also ==
- List of dams in Queensland
