= Max Gaylard =

Australian diplomat and international public servant

- Born: 1946 (age 79–80); Nambour, Queensland
- Education: University of Queensland; Australian National University
- Occupations: Public servant, diplomat

Maxwell "Max" Gaylard (born 1946) is a former Australian diplomat and international public servant.

Born in Nambour, Queensland, he was educated at Nambour State School and Nambour State High School, then the University of Queensland and Australian National University.

Joining the Department of External Affairs in 1968, Gaylard was the first diplomatic cadet to be conscripted into the army. He then graduated from the Officer Training Unit at Scheyville in 1968 where he was awarded the Sword of Honour. He was then assigned as a Second Lieutenant/Platoon Commander to the 1st Battalion, Royal Australian Regiment, serving in Malaysia and Singapore as part of a Commonwealth Brigade under the Five-Power Defence Arrangements. He returned to the Department in Canberra in 1970, and subsequently served as an Australian diplomat in Mexico, Burma and Singapore. He was appointed Australian High Commissioner to the Solomon Islands from 1985 to 1988. While resident in the Solomons, he and other diplomats received death threats from an Australian expatriate-dubbed 'Mr Smith' in the media. Reflecting in 2014, Gaylard said that the saga involving Smith had made the posting "fairly tough".

At the end of his posting in the Solomons, he was seconded by the Australian Government from 1988 to 1996 to London, as Director of International Relations (later re- named Political Affairs) of the Commonwealth Secretariat. In that capacity, and during an era of democratisation throughout the Commonwealth, Gaylard served as an envoy of the Commonwealth Secretary-General to a range of Commonwealth countries going through the processes of constitutional change and multi-party elections.

In 1997, Gaylard joined the United Nations as an Assistant then Deputy Humanitarian Coordinator with the Oil-for-Food Programme in northern Iraq, after which he served as the Head of the UN Office for the Coordination of Humanitarian Affairs in Sudan from 1999 to 2002. He was then appointed by the UN Secretary-General as UN Resident and Humanitarian Coordinator for Somalia from 2002 to 2006, and was the Director of the UN Mine Action Service based in New York from 2006 to 2008. From 2008 to 2012, he was appointed by the Secretary General as UN Resident and Humanitarian Coordinator for Palestine and Deputy Special Coordinator for the Middle East Peace Process. From 2013 to 2014, Gaylard served as a Senior Adviser to the Government of the United Arab Emirates in Abu Dhabi, and 2015–2016 as a UN Assistant Secretary-General and Senior Adviser to the Kingdom of Saudi Arabia in Riyadh.

Diplomatic posts
Preceded by Trevor Sofield	Australian High Commissioner to the Solomon Islands; 1985–1988	Succeeded by John Starey
