= Kureelpa, Queensland =

Kureelpa
- Suburb
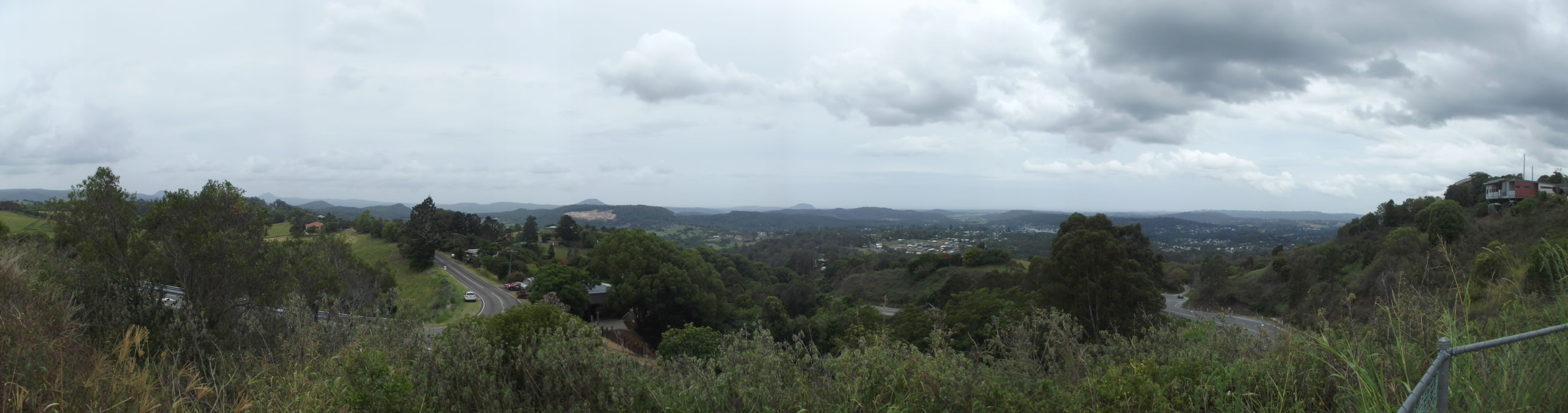
- Kureelpa panorama, 2015

- Interactive map of Kureelpa
- Coordinates: 26.6066°S 152.8927°E
- Country: Australia
- State: Queensland
- LGA: Sunshine Coast Region
- Location: 7.6 km (4.7 mi) W of Nambour; 24.1 km (15.0 mi) WNW of Maroochydore; 37.5 km (23.3 mi) NW of Caloundra; 115 km (71 mi) N of Brisbane

Government
  - State electorate: Nicklin
  - Federal division: Fairfax

Area
  - Total: 13.6 km^{2} (5.3 sq mi)

Population
  - Total: 968 (2021 census)
  - Density: 71.18/km^{2} (184.3/sq mi)
- Time zone: UTC+10:00 (AEST)
- Postcode: 4560
Suburbs around Kureelpa
Gheerulla	Kiamba	Image Flat
Gheerulla	Kureelpa	Highworth
Mapleton	Dulong	Burnside; Perwillowen

Kureelpa is a rural locality in the Sunshine Coast Region, Queensland, Australia. In the 2021 census, Kureelpa had a population of 968 people.

== Geography ==
Poona Dam is an earth-fill embankment dam with a toe drain with an un-gated spillway across a tributary of the South Maroochy River. The main purpose of the dam is for storage of potable water for the Sunshine Coast region.

== History ==
The name Kureelpa is reportedly derived from an Aboriginal name, Kuril-ba, meaning a place of rats and mice.

Kureelpa Provisional School opened on 24 February 1914, becoming Kureelpa State School on 1 June 1916. The school closed on 1 December 1967. It was at 551 Nambour Mapleton Road (26.61797°S 152.90081°E), now the site of the Blackall Range Independent School.

Poona State School opened on 9 November 1915 and closed on 30 June 1933. Despite the name, this school was not located in Poona in the Fraser Coast Region, but "via Nambour", possibly in the vicinity of the Poona Dam in Kureelpa. The first teacher was Ethel Edwards. It closed due to low student numbers in June 1933. The school buildings were sold in 1937.

The Poona Dam was built in 1959. The height of the dam wall was increased in 1969 with upgrades to the spillway in 1998.

Blackall Range Independent School opened on 2 February 1975. It initially occupied the Kureelpa Hall and then moved to the building of the former Kureelpa State School.

== Demographics ==
In the 2016 census, Kureelpa had a population of 907 people.

In the 2021 census, Kureelpa had a population of 968 people.

== Education ==
Blackall Range Independent School is a private primary and secondary (Prep–12) school for boys and girls at 551 Nambour Mapleton Road (26.6178°S 152.9012°E). In 2017, the school had an enrolment of 54 students with 8 teachers (6 full-time equivalent) and 11 non-teaching staff (7 full-time equivalent).

There are no government schools in Kureelpa. The nearest government primary schools are Mapleton State School in neighbouring Mapleton to the south-west, Burnside State School in neighbouring Burnside to the south-east, and Nambour State College (junior school) in Nambour to the east. The nearest government secondary schools are Burnside State High School in Burnside and Nambour State College (senior school) in Nambour.

== Bushwalks ==
The 8.5-kilometre (5.3 mi) Kureelpa Falls circuit starts at the Mapleton day-use area trailhead and passes through a gorge and various rockpools. It should be avoided after heavy rains.
