= Unity College (Caloundra) =

Location
- 47 Lomond Crescent; Caloundra West, Queensland; Australia; 26.802°S 153.09°E

Information
- Type: Private, Catholic
- Motto: Unite, Inspire, Succeed
- Established: 2006
- Principal: Dan McShea
- Grades: P–12
- Enrolment: 1422 (2017)
- Colours: Navy blue, green, gold and white

Unity College is a coeducational ecumenical college located in the Bellvista Estate in Caloundra West, a suburb of the Sunshine Coast Region in Queensland, Australia. The college is administered by Brisbane Catholic Education, working in partnership with the Caloundra Catholic and Uniting Churches.

Unity College has a total enrolment of more than 1400 students from Prep to Year 12, with an official count of 1422 students in 2017. Most students who attend Unity College are from the local Caloundra area, whereas others are from the Beerwah, Mooloolah Valley and Glenview areas. Approximately 50% of the school's students identify as Catholic and 16% are of the Uniting tradition, whereas the remaining 34% are of other faith backgrounds.

== Houses ==
Unity College includes the following four houses with their respective colours, elements and significance:

House name	Colour	Element	Significance
Goath (pronounced Gwey)	Gold	Wind	Source of energy. Symbol of empowerment.
Talamh (pronounced Tah-live)	Green	Earth	Source of community. Symbol of sustainability.
Tine (pronounced Tin-a)	Red	Fire	Source of passion. Symbol of refinement.
Uisce (pronounced Ish-ka)	Blue	Water	Source of life. Symbol of replenishment.

== Facilities ==
Facilities at Unity College include a chapel, an auditorium, and a Learning Resource Centre. There are 21 Junior Phase classrooms (three classes for each year level), and a Junior Phase Music building. For middle phase students there is a Middle Years Technology Centre (MYTC), which includes Science, Visual Art, Food Technology and Industrial Technology classrooms.

There is a 171-seat lecture theatre, two undercover multipurpose areas (Clachain Centre and Mo Chuisle Centre, two sports fields, and two basketball courts.

== Co-curricular activities ==
=== Faith and Formation ===
- ANZAC Day March
- Caritas Australia Project Compassion & Carita's Ks
- Rosie's Charity
- St Vinnie's Sleepover
- Student Leadership
- Youth Group

=== Wellbeing ===
- Art Unite
- Bee Club
- College Musical
- Gaming Club
- Instrumental Music Program
- NARA Indigenous Group
- Sports clubs and activities

=== Teaching and learning ===
- Debating
- Japanese Exchange
- Japanese Speech Contest
- Mathematics competitions
- Mooting

=== Sports ===
- Rugby League Program
- Touch Football

== Clubs and associations ==
- Little Gem's Playgroup, an activity of the Caloundra Uniting Church in co-operation with Unity College
- Parents & Friends
- Unity Bellvista Netball Club, established in 2012, is an associated club of the Caloundra District Netball Association
- Unity College Soccer Club, established in 2011, is a non-profit school-based soccer club in the Sunshine Coast Churches Soccer Association
