= Australian High Commissioner to the Solomon Islands =

High Commissioner of Australia to the Solomon Islands

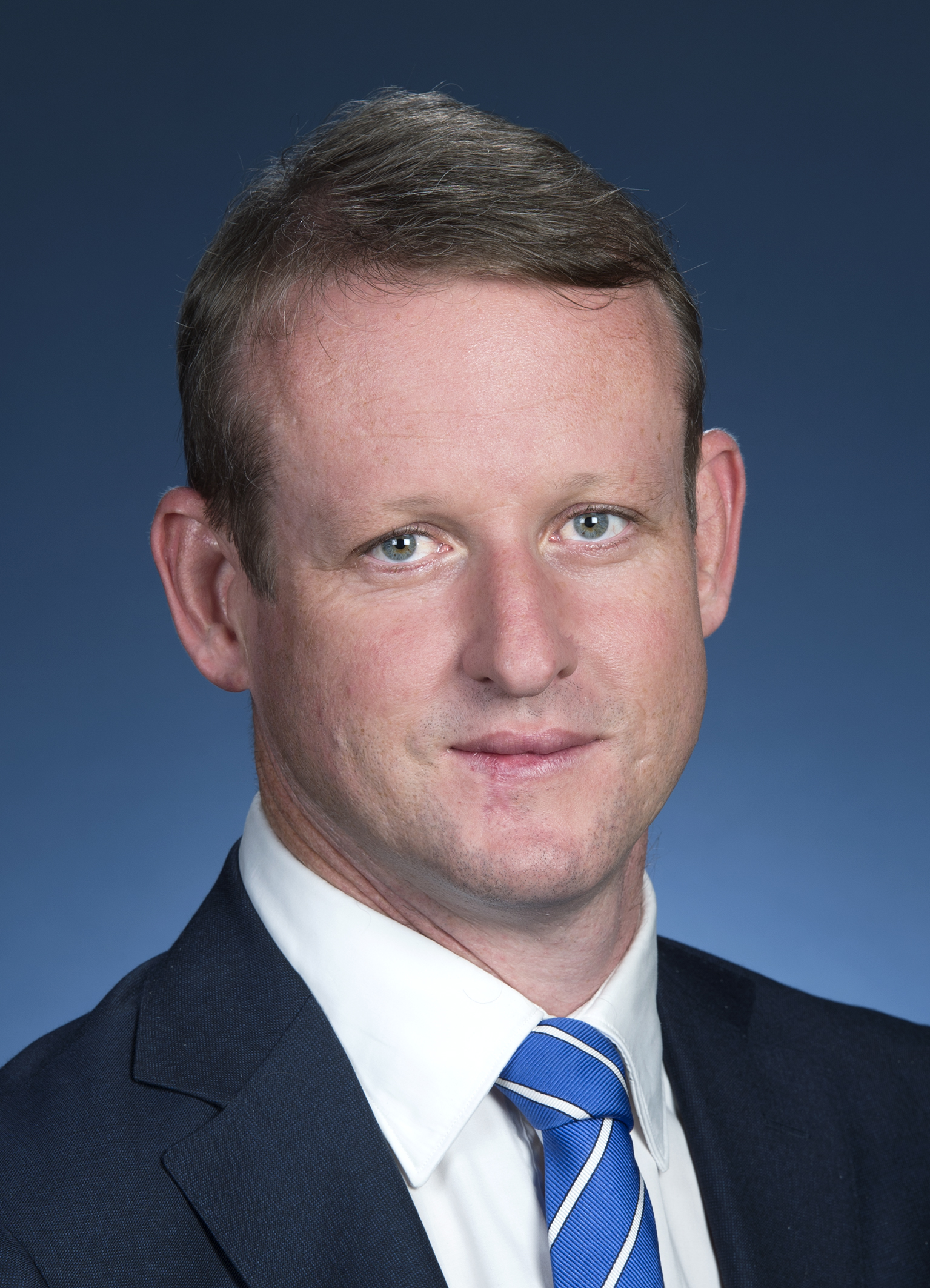
- Incumbent; Rod Hilton since 22 November 2022
- Department of Foreign Affairs and Trade
- Style: His Excellency
- Reports to: Minister for Foreign Affairs
- Seat: Honiara
- Nominator: Prime Minister of Australia
- Appointer: Governor General of Australia
- Inaugural holder: Trevor Harvey Boyd Sofield
- Formation: 1982
- Website: Australian High Commission, Honiara

The high commissioner of Australia to the Solomon Islands is an officer of the Australian Department of Foreign Affairs and Trade and the head of the High Commission of the Commonwealth of Australia to the Solomon Islands. The position has the rank and status of an ambassador extraordinary and plenipotentiary and is based with the High Commission on the corner of Hibiscus Avenue and Mud Alley, Honiara.

The high commissioner since January 2023 has been Rod Hilton, whose appointment was announced in November 2022. The Solomon Islands and Australia have had diplomatic relations since 1982, following the independence of Solomon Islands on 7 July 1978.

== List of high commissioners ==
#	Officeholder	Term start date	Term end date	Time in office	Notes
1	Trevor Harvey Boyd Sofield	1982	15 August 1985	2–3 years	
2	Max Gaylard	15 August 1985	1988	2–3 years	
3	John Starey	1988	March 1992	3–4 years	
4	Ruth Lorraine Pearce	March 1992	June 1994	2 years, 3 months	
5	Robert Kenneth Flynn	June 1994	July 1997	3 years, 1 month	
6	James Batley	July 1997	July 1999	2 years	
7	Martin Sharp	July 1999	July 2001	2 years	
8	Robert Davis	July 2001	December 2003	2 years, 5 months	
9	Patrick Cole^{[note 1]}	December 2003	12 September 2006	2 years, 9 months	
10	Peter Hooton	12 January 2007	12 May 2009	2 years, 120 days	
11	Frank Ingruber	12 May 2009	26 April 2011	1 year, 349 days	
12	Matt Anderson	26 April 2011	20 December 2013	2 years, 238 days	
13	Andrew Byrne	20 December 2013	December 2016	2 years, 11 months	
14	Roderick Brazier	December 2016	2019	2–3 years	
15	Lachlan Strahan	10 January 2020	January 25, 2023	6 years, 9 months	
16	Rod Hilton	January 2023	December 2025		
17	Jeff Roach	January 2026	incumbent		

=== Notes ===
^[note 1]: On 12 September 2006 the Australian High Commissioner was declared persona non grata by the Solomon Islands Government alleging that he was "talking too much to the opposition," and had been expressing his opposition to a government-appointed commission of inquiry into recent civil unrest.

== See also ==
- Australia–Solomon Islands relations
- Foreign relations of Australia
