= Highworth, Queensland =

Highworth
- Suburb
- Interactive map of Highworth
- Coordinates: 26.615°S 152.9261°E
- Country: Australia
- State: Queensland
- City: Sunshine Coast
- LGA: Sunshine Coast Region
- Location: 3.9 km (2.4 mi) W of Nambour; 108 km (67 mi) N of Brisbane

Government
  - State electorate: Nicklin
  - Federal division: Fairfax

Area
  - Total: 1.3 km^{2} (0.50 sq mi)

Population
  - Total: 348 (2021 census)
  - Density: 268/km^{2} (693/sq mi)
- Time zone: UTC+10:00 (AEST)
- Postcode: 4560
Suburbs around Highworth
Image Flat	Image Flat	Image Flat
Kureelpa	Highworth	Nambour
Kureelpa	Burnside	Nambour

Highworth is a mixed-use locality in the Sunshine Coast Region, Queensland, Australia. In the 2021 census, Highworth had a population of 348 people.

== Geography ==
The locality has an area of residential development, an extension of the suburban development of neighbouring Nambour. The rest of the locality is used for agriculture, predominantly grazing on native vegetation.

== History ==
The locality is believed to be named after the town Highworth in England.

Highworth Provisional School opened on 27 May 1901. It became Highworth State School on 1 January 1909. It closed on 15 August 1932.

== Demographics ==
In the 2011 census, Highworth had a population of 307 people.

In the 2016 census, Highworth had a population of 301 people.

In the 2021 census, Highworth had a population of 348 people.

== Education ==
There are no schools in Highworth. The nearest government primary school is Burnside State School in neighbouring Burnside to the south. The nearest government secondary school is Burnside State High School, also in Burnside.
