= Australia–Solomon Islands relations =

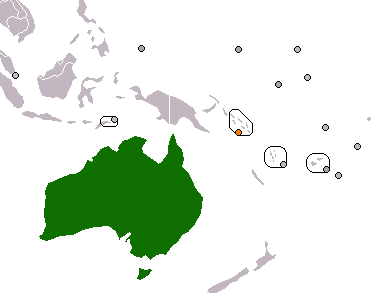

- Australia: Solomon Islands

Monthly value (A$ millions) of merchandise imported to Australia from Solomon Islands since 1988

Monthly value (A$ millions) of merchandise exported from Australia to Solomon Islands since 1988

Foreign relations exist between Australia and Solomon Islands. Australia has a High Commission in Honiara and Solomon Islands has a High Commission in Canberra. The two countries are members of the Pacific Islands Forum and Commonwealth realms with King Charles III as their head of state.

== History ==
Australia–Solomon Islands relations
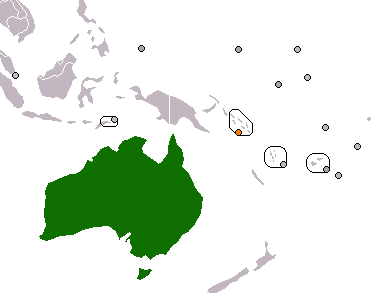

- Australia: Solomon Islands

In the 1950s, British and Australian government officials discussed transferring sovereignty of the British Solomon Islands to Australia. The Australian external affairs minister Paul Hasluck brought a proposal for a transfer to cabinet in 1956, but it was rejected primarily for reasons of cost.

Following the Solomon Islands' independence on 7 July 1978, Australia became the first country to establish diplomatic relations with the Solomon Islands.

=== The Julian Moti affair, 2006-2007 ===
Between 2006 and 2007, Australian-Solomon Islands bilateral relations were strained by the "Julian Moti" affair. The Solomons Prime Minister Manasseh Sogavare had appointed Australian lawyer Julian Moti as Attorney General of Solomon Islands twice in 2006 and July 2007 despite strong opposition from Australian Prime Minister John Howard and Foreign Minister Alexander Downer. Australia and Papua New Guinea had sought Moti's extradition over alleged sexual offending in Vanuatu several years earlier.

In September 2006, Sogavare expelled Australian high commissioner Patrick Cole and accused Australia of using developmental aid to bully the Solomon Islands. He also alleged that Australia's involvement in the region could be "driving this country down the path of another conflict that could be more serious" than the April 2006 riots that broke out after an election won by the former deputy prime minister Snyder Rini, when thousands of anti-government protesters burned down buildings in Solomon Islands' capital Honiara's Chinese district, alleging that either the People's Republic of China or the Republic of China had paid lawmakers to vote for Rini.

On 1 October 2007, the Solomon Islands' Foreign Affairs Minister Patteson Oti addressed the General Assembly of the United Nations, and accused Australia of undermining his country's sovereignty, stating "Mine is too nationalistic a government to become captive to the fortunes which justify our perpetual retention under siege. My [country's government] remain[s] unmoved by Australian resistance to our attempts to reclaim our sovereignty and independence." This led the Australian Permanent Representative to the United Nations Robert Hill to exercise his government's right of reply, denying the accusation that RAMSI was an occupying force. Similar sentiments were expressed by New Zealand's Permanent Representative Rosemary Banks, who said that RAMSI's presence was consistent with the United Nations Charter and Solomon Islands law.

Relations subsequently improved when both Howard and Sogavare lost office in December 2007, and their successors Kevin Rudd and Derek Sikua immediately set out to improve relations between Canberra and Honiara. Moti was subsequently extradited to Australia to face trial for sexual offending.

=== 2022 Chinese security pact ===
In late March 2022, Australian Foreign Minister Marise Payne and Defence Minister Peter Dutton expressed opposition to a draft security pact between China and the Solomon Islands that would allow Beijing to deploy military forces in the country and establish a military base. Similar concerns about the Sino-Solomon Islands security pact were expressed by the New Zealand Government.

In response, Solomon Islands Prime Minister Manasseh Sogavare defended the security pact with China, criticising the leaking of the document and objecting to the Australian media's coverage of the security pact. In addition, the Chinese Government defended law enforcement and bilateral cooperation with the Solomon Islands and disputed Australian criticism that Beijing was coercing the Solomon Islands.

=== 2024 Australian security agreement ===
On 20 December 2024, Australian Prime Minister Anthony Albanese signed an A$190 million (US$118 million) agreement with Solomon Islands Prime Minister Jeremiah Manele to expand the capabilities of the Royal Solomon Islands Police Force. This funding package would support the Solomon Islands Police Force's funding, training and infrastructure including the construction of a new police training centre in Honiara. This funding packaged was intended to compete with China's security pact with the Solomon Islands.

== Australian aid ==
Australia is a significant foreign aid donor to the Solomon Islands, and the country's main development partner. According to the Australian government, their aid in the Solomon Islands is focused on "improving health, education, water and sanitation, transport, telecommunications, law and justice, rural livelihoods and effective governance." In 2018-19, Australia donated $187 million to the Solomon Islands, making it the second biggest recipient of Australian aid, behind Papua New Guinea, which received $572.2 million in 2018-19.

Following the outbreak of conflict between the Guadalcanal and Malaitan peoples in 1998, Australia led other nations as part of the Regional Assistance Mission to Solomon Islands (RAMSI) between 2003 and 2017. Over 7,000 Australian Defence Force members have been deployed in the Solomon Islands as part of that mission. In 2013, the Australian government committed $500 million to assisting the Solomon Islands through the regional assistance mission in the following four years. The mission officially ended on 30 June 2017.

In June 2018, the two countries signed an agreement for the sinking of an undersea high speed internet link between the Solomon Islands and the Australian mainland. Though seen as a security issue for Australia, it is believed more than $100 million will come out of Australia's aid budget.
