= Image Flat, Queensland =

Image Flat
- Suburb
- Interactive map of Image Flat
- Coordinates: 26.5986°S 152.9344°E
- Country: Australia
- State: Queensland
- City: Sunshine Coast
- LGA: Sunshine Coast Region
- Location: 6.0 km (3.7 mi) NW of Nambour; 21.7 km (13.5 mi) NW of Maroochydore; 36.3 km (22.6 mi) NNW of Caloundra; 113 km (70 mi) N of Brisbane

Government
  - State electorate: Fairfax
  - Federal division: Nicklin

Area
  - Total: 9.4 km^{2} (3.6 sq mi)

Population
  - Total: 457 (2021 census)
  - Density: 48.62/km^{2} (125.9/sq mi)
- Time zone: UTC+10:00 (AEST)
- Postcode: 4560
Suburbs around Image Flat
Kiamba	Kulangoor	Kulangoor
Kureelpa	Image Flat	Parklands
Kureelpa	Highworth	Nambour

Image Flat is a rural locality in the Sunshine Coast Region, Queensland, Australia. In the 2021 census, Image Flat had a population of 457 people.

== Geography ==
The locality is on the outskirts of Nambour. The land use is a mix of rural residential housing and grazing on native vegetation.

== History ==
A rural farming area, the locale was named prior to 1896. A government receiving office was opened in 1901. During the 1910s, the area had market gardens. Sugar cane was then complemented by a dairy industry, and later as free from frost, bananas. There was a notable Finnish population at one time.

In the late 1890s, a sugar cane tramway was constructed that terminated at Image Flat. By 1903, the line had been extended, but having to address a 1:23 grade. The cane trolleys were being drawn by horses until picked up further along by a locomotive, for the Moreton Central Sugar Cane Company Limited. A line extension was still being sought by 1923. Sugar cane pests and diseases had an impact in the local industry in 1924. In 1954, the concern had crossed to the Panama disease in bananas.

A committee was formed by 1951 seeking to bring electrical light and power to the area, although this had been proposed by a Nambour committee in 1923.

== Demographics ==
In the 2011 census, Image Flat had a population of 462 people.

In the 2016 census, Image Flat had a population of 443 people.

In the 2021 census, Image Flat had a population of 457 people.

== Education ==
There are no schools in Image Flat. Nambour State College in neighbouring Nambour to the south-east is the nearest government primary and secondary school.
