= Nambour State High School =

Coordinates: 26°37′22″S 152°57′46″E

Nambour State College
- Nambour, Queensland; Australia

Information
- Type: Public, co-educational, secondary, day school
- Motto: Local foundations, global opportunities
- Established: 2 February 1953
- Principal: Anthony Green
- Enrolment: ~1367 (2006)
- Campus: Rural
- Colours: Blue, white, yellow
- Mascot: Stormer
- Website: namboursc.eq.edu.au

Nambour State College is a co-educational, state high school located in Nambour, Queensland, Australia.

Established on 2 February 1953. In 2006, the school had enrolment figures of 1,367, including adult students. Previously it was called the Nambour State Rural School, it had operated from 1940 to 8 January 1953; it was then split into a primary school and the high school. In 2016 Nambour State High School was reunited with the primary school (Nambour State School) and renamed to Nambour State College

The school's first Principal was George William Lockie, who was given the title of "acting principal". He later led Salisbury, Mount Isa, and Bundaberg high schools, before moving to Brisbane State High School. The school's current principal is Anthony Green.

== Notable alumni ==
- Dan Anstey, radio and television presenter, was dux of the school in 2001.
- Ray Barber, state member for Cooroora from 1989 to 1992.
- Gordon Bennett, Australian contemporary artist.
- Jon Coghill, drummer from Powderfinger.
- Max Gaylard, diplomat and United Nations Assistant Secretary-General.
- Jay Gooding, Australian Tennis Player
- James McGrath, Senator for Queensland since 2014
- Clint Robinson, Olympic canoe racer.
- Kevin Rudd, the 26th Prime Minister of Australia, was dux of the school in 1974.
- Fiona Simpson, state member for Maroochydore since 1992 and Speaker of the Legislative Assembly of Queensland from 2012 to 2015.
- Wayne Swan, Deputy Prime Minister and Rudd's future Treasurer, attended the school at the same time but the two didn't know each other as Swan was three years older.

== See also ==
- List of schools in Queensland
