= Perwillowen, Queensland =

Perwillowen
- Suburb
- Interactive map of Perwillowen
- Coordinates: 26.6358°S 152.9261°E
- Country: Australia
- State: Queensland
- LGA: Sunshine Coast Region
- Location: 2.3 km (1.4 mi) W of Burnside; 4.0 km (2.5 mi) WSW of Nambour; 33.8 km (21.0 mi) NW of Caloundra; 106 km (66 mi) N of Brisbane

Government
  - State electorate: Nicklin
  - Federal division: Fairfax

Area
  - Total: 3.6 km^{2} (1.4 sq mi)

Population
  - Total: 213 (2021 census)
  - Density: 59.2/km^{2} (153.2/sq mi)
- Time zone: UTC+10:00 (AEST)
- Postcode: 4560
Suburbs around Perwillowen
Kureelpa	Burnside	Burnside
Dulong	Perwillowen	Burnside
Dulong	Towen Mountain	Coes Creek

Perwillowen is a rural locality in the Sunshine Coast Region, Queensland, Australia. In the 2021 census, Perwillowen had a population of 213 people.

== Geography ==
Burnside Road forms the north-east boundary of the locality. Perwillowen Road enters the locality from the east (Burnside) and proceeds west through the centre of the locality as its main artery, terminating within the north-west of the locality.

The land use is predominantly a mixture of housing (both rural residential and suburban blocks) and grazing on native vegetation.

== History ==
The name Perwillowen is reportedly an Aboriginal name for pigeons. It has had many variant spellings over the years including Pillywillman, Pillawillamon, Pillewilliman and Perwillowan.

Perwillowen Creek Provisional School opened on 15 May 1916. It was 21 by 14 feet (6.4 by 4.3 m) built on high stumps with a verandah. There were 22 children enrolled and the first teacher was Miss E. M. Lavin. It become Perwillowen Creek State School about 1923. It closed in October 1930 due to low student numbers but reopened on 13 July 1932. It finally closed in 1959. It was on Perwillowen Road (approx 26.6384°S 152.9256°E).

Nambour Wesleyan Methodist Church opened in 1980.

== Demographics ==
In the 2016 census, Perwillowen had a population of 221 people.

In the 2021 census, Perwillowen had a population of 213 people.

== Education ==
There are no schools in Perwillowen. The nearest government primary and secondary schools are Burnside State School and Burnside State High School, both in neighbouring Burnside to the north-east. There are also non-government schools in Burnside and other Nambour suburbs.

== Amenities ==
Nambour Wesleyan Methodist Church is at 165 Perwillowen Road (26.6399°S 152.9409°E). It is part of the Wesleyan Methodist Church of Australia.
