= St John's College, Nambour =

St John's College Nambour

Location
- Nambour, Queensland; Australia
- Coordinates: 26.6392°S 152.9453°E

Information
- Type: Catholic, co-educational, secondary, day school
- Motto: Unbind and Set Free
- Established: 4 February 1940
- Principal: Christopher Gold
- Enrolment: ~700 (2018)
- Website: www.stjohns.qld.edu.au

St John's College is a co-educational, Catholic high school located in Nambour, Queensland, Australia.

== History ==
Established in 1940, St John's is the oldest independent secondary school on the Sunshine Coast. Originally known as St Joseph's College, it was formerly a day and boarding school for girls only, run by the Good Samaritan Sisters and was located at the same site as St Joseph's Primary School. Currently, return of the Scoey teachers at St John's College. In 1979 St Joseph's College was relocated to a new site on Perwillowen Road, Nambour. Male students were enrolled for the first time in 1979. Previously only catering for students up to grade ten, on the new site St Joseph's expanded to include students up to grade twelve. The first grade 12 class graduated in 1983. St Joseph's College was changed to St John's College in 1985. Along with the name change, came a school motto change from the Latin "Virtus Sola Nobilitat" (meaning Virtue Alone Enobles) to "Unbind and Set Free" (referring to the biblical story of the raising of Lazarus). Due to the retention of a saint's name beginning with the letter "J", the school badge with its StJC centre was able to remain very similar.

== School site ==
The site for St John's College is on top of a hill. Originally a small crops farm, the only building on the site was a small farm house. Purchased by St Joseph's Parish in 1963, it was many years before the land was developed. Originally the plan was to build the school on the slope of the hill and have playing fields on the top. After much consultation however, it was decided to flatten the top of the hill and establish the buildings there instead. In 1978 construction of the College site began. A significant area of land was cleared and a large underwater tank was built. This was vital to have a water supply for the school. The first buildings on the site were demountable only. As student numbers increased over the following years, further demountable buildings were added. The first brick buildings were completed in early 1983, and gradually during the 1980s, 1990s and 2000s further brick buildings were added. As new buildings were added, the older demountable buildings were removed. Playing fields have also been added over the years and the Multi-purpose Centre was completed in 2008.

== Awards ==
In 2008 St John's Tuckshop French chef Laurant Vancam helped the school to win the Secondary School Tuckshop of the Year Award. In 2009 Mr Vancam won an award for Innovation in a tuckshop. His menu in the St John's College tuckshop at that time was unique in Queensland.

== See also ==
- Lists of schools in Queensland
