= Sunshine Coast Institute of TAFE =

The Sunshine Coast Institute of TAFE (SCIT) is the Sunshine Coast institute of the Technical and Further Education organization. Formerly known as the Cooloola Sunshine Institute of TAFE, the name was later changed to the Sunshine Coast Institute of TAFE to reflect the actual location of the institute.

It has campuses located at: Nambour, Maroochydore, Mooloolaba, Noosa and Caloundra.

Sunshine Coast TAFE has agreements with the University of the Sunshine Coast, University of Southern Queensland and Central Queensland University for credit transfer of several programmes.
