= Burnside, Queensland =

Burnside
- Suburb
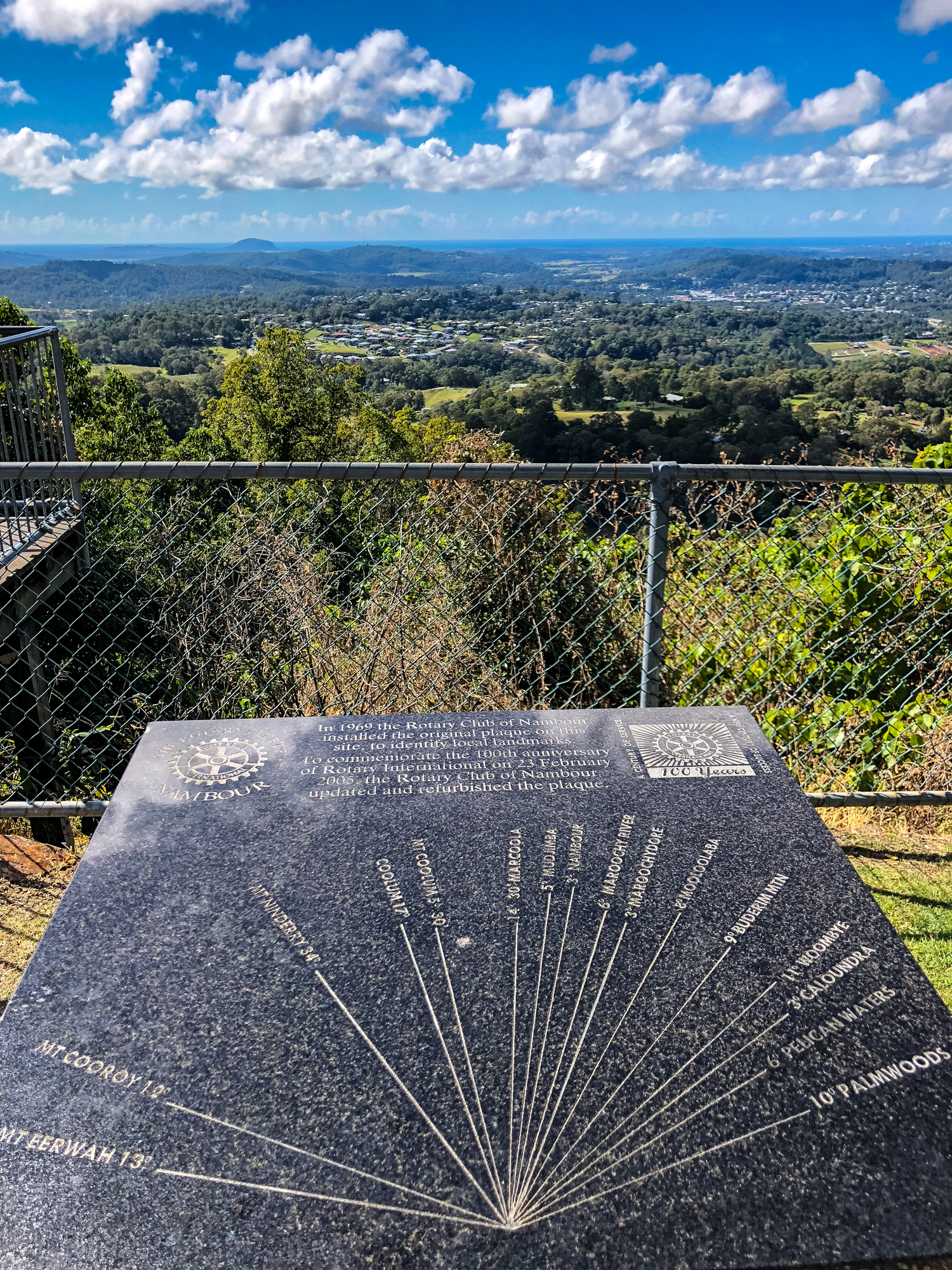
- View from Dulong Lookout across Burnside towards the Coral Sea, 2018

- Interactive map of Burnside
- Coordinates: 26.6316°S 152.9344°E
- Country: Australia
- State: Queensland
- City: Nambour
- LGA: Sunshine Coast Region
- Location: 1.7 km (1.1 mi) SW of Nambour; 17.1 km (10.6 mi) W of Maroochydore; 31.5 km (19.6 mi) NW of Caloundra; 107 km (66 mi) N of Brisbane

Government
  - State electorate: Nicklin
  - Federal division: Fairfax

Area
  - Total: 4.8 km^{2} (1.9 sq mi)

Population
  - Total: 3,104 (2021 census)
  - Density: 647/km^{2} (1,675/sq mi)
- Time zone: UTC+10:00 (AEST)
- Postcode: 4560
Suburbs around Burnside
Kureelpa	Highworth	Nambour
Perwillowen	Burnside	Nambour
Perwillowen	Perwillowen	Coes Creek

Burnside is a residential locality of the town of Nambour in the Sunshine Coast Region, Queensland, Australia. In the 2021 census, Burnside had a population of 3,104 people.

== History ==
In 1881, Irish immigrants Patrick King and his wife Mary acquired a 314-acre (127 ha) selection along the southern boundary of the Nambour Cattle Run. The property was named Burnside derived from the Gaelic term burn (meaning creek), as the selection ran along Whalley Creek).

The Whalley family (whom the creek was named after) arrived in 1884.

The district was known as Running Creek until being renamed Burnside in 1918.

Nambour Special School opened on 24 January 1977.

Burnside State School opened on 23 January 1978. (There was another Burnside State School west of Brisbane which opened in 1877 and was renamed Mulgowie State School.)

Burnside State High School opened on 30 January 1979.

St Joseph's Catholic High School was originally in Nambour but moved to Perwillowen Road in 1979 and was renamed St John's College in honour of St John the Evangelist in 1985.

In 1980, it was decided a TAFE campus should be developed in Burnside, with construction starting in 1981.

== Demographics ==
In the 2016 census, Burnside had a population of 2,409 people.

In the 2021 census, Burnside had a population of 3,104 people. The population of Burnside is characterised by a gender distribution of 48.2% male, and 51.8% female, with a median age of 38 years.

== Education ==
Burnside State School is a government primary (Early Childhood to Year 6) school for boys and girls at 51 Blaxland Road (26.6304°S 152.9475°E). In 2017, the school had an enrolment of 485 students with 47 teachers (40 full-time equivalents) and 22 non-teaching staff (14 full-time equivalents). In 2022, the school had an enrolment of 376 students with 34 teachers (30 full-time equivalents) and 23 non-teaching staff (16 full-time equivalents).

Nambour Special School is a special primary and secondary (Prep–12) school for boys and girls at 70 Windsor Road (26.6329°S 152.9458°E). It provides special education in the Sunshine Coast region. In 2017, the school had an enrolment of 151 students with 46 teachers (37 full-time equivalent) and 53 non-teaching staff (34 full-time equivalent). In 2022, the school had 141 students with 46 teachers (38 full-time equivalent) and 50 non-teaching staff (32 full-time equivalent).

Burnside State High School is a government secondary (7–12) school for boys and girls at Blaxland Road (26.6304°S 152.9472°E). In 2017, the school had an enrolment of 796 students with 78 teachers (72 full-time equivalent) and 36 non-teaching staff (24 full-time equivalent). In 2022, the school had 827 students with 88 teachers (77 full-time equivalent) and 37 non-teaching staff (27 full-time equivalent).

St John's College is a Catholic secondary (7–12) school for boys and girls at Perwillowen Road (26.6379°S 152.9449°E). In 2017, the school had an enrolment of 765 students with 58 teachers (55 full-time equivalent) and 34 non-teaching staff (26 full-time equivalent). In 2022, the school had 847 students with 67 teachers (62.4 full-time equivalent) and 55 non-teaching staff (38.4 full-time equivalent).

Physically the TAFE campus is the largest of Sunshine Coast Institute of TAFE campuses, and offers courses including Childcare, Community Work, Conservation and Land Management, Horticulture, Construction, Graphic Design, Music, Photography, Interior Design, and Building Design.

== Amenities ==
The Australia Post Business Hub for the Nambour area is situated in Burnside.

There are several Christian denominational places of worship in the Burnside area. They include:

- Nambour Gospel Chapel
- Flame Tree Church (Baptist)
- Nambour Seventh-day Adventist Church
- Nambour Presbyterian Church
- Nambour Wesleyan Methodist Church

Sundale Rotary Retirement Community is a seniors community of 80 units and occupies 2.8 ha (6.9 acres). It has an extensive range of support and entertainment services.

== Attractions ==
Dulong Lookout is on Dulong Road on the western edge of the locality (26.6264°S 152.9127°E). The view to the east overlooks Burnside, Nambour, and beyond to the Coral Sea.
