= Water storage =

Storage of water by various means

Water storage is a broad term referring to storage of both potable water for consumption, and non potable water for use in agriculture. In both developing countries and some developed countries found in tropical climates, there is a need to store potable drinking water during the dry season. In agriculture water storage, water is stored for later use in natural water sources, such as groundwater aquifers, soil water, natural wetlands, and small artificial ponds, tanks and reservoirs behind major dams. Storing water invites a host of potential issues regardless of that water's intended purpose, including contamination through organic and inorganic means.

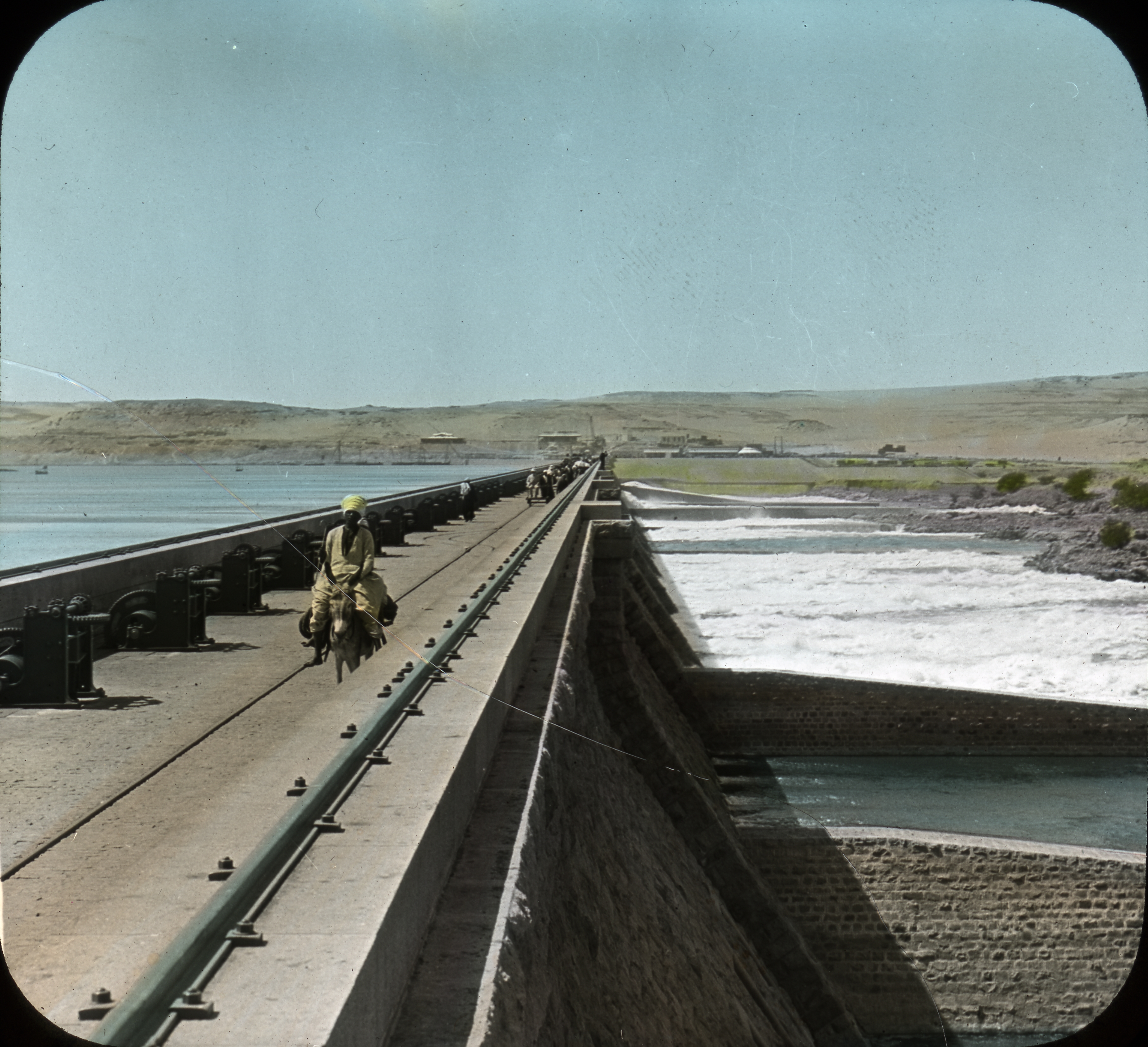
Great Nile Dam, at first cataract, Egypt, 1908, Copyright, 1908, by Stereo-Travel Co. Brooklyn Museum Archives

== Types ==
=== Groundwater ===
Groundwater is located beneath the ground surface in soil pore spaces and in the fractures of rock formations. A unit of rock or an unconsolidated deposit is called an aquifer when it can yield a usable quantity of water. The depth at which soil pore spaces or fractures and voids in rock become completely saturated with water is called the water table. There are two broad types of aquifers: An unconfined aquifer is where the surface is not restricted by impervious rocks, so the water table is at atmospheric pressure. In a confined aquifer, the upper surface of water is overlain by a layer of impervious rock, so the groundwater is stored under pressure.

Aquifers receive water through two ways, one from precipitation that flows through the unsaturated zone of the soil profile, and two from lakes and rivers. When a water table reaches capacity, or all soil is completely saturated, the water table meets the surface of the ground where water discharges in the form of springs or seeps.

It is also possible to artificially recharge aquifers (using wells), for example through the use of Aquifer storage and recovery (ASR).

=== Soil moisture ===
Groundwater is stored in two zones, one being the saturated zone, or Aquifer, the other is the pore space of unsaturated soil immediately below the ground surface. Soil moisture is the water held between soil particles in the root zone (rhizosphere) of plants, generally in the top 200 cm of soil. Water storage in the soil profile is extremely important for agriculture, especially in locations that rely on rainfall for cultivating plants. For example, in Africa rain-fed agriculture accounts for 95% of farmed land.

=== Wetlands ===
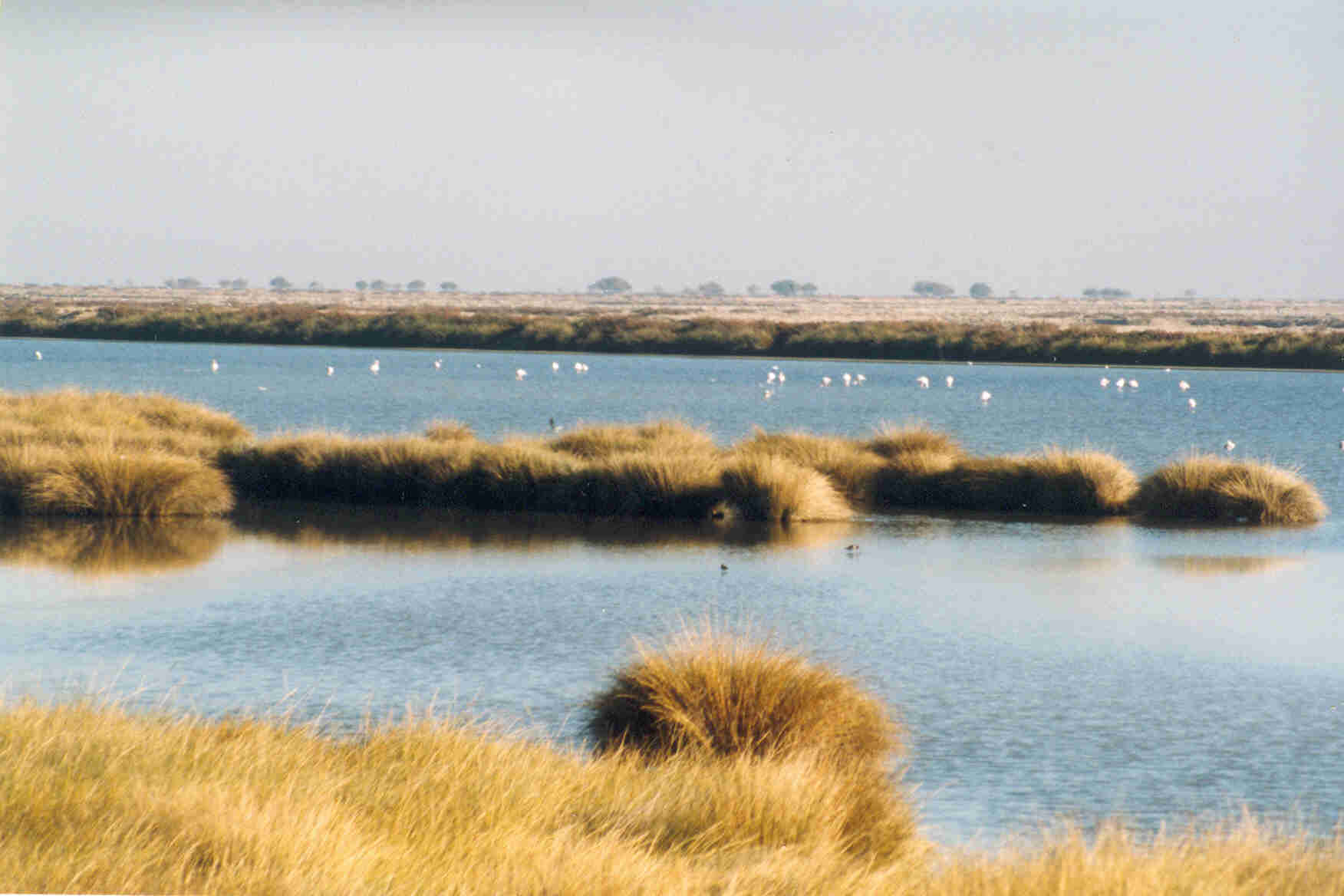
Wetlands in Donana National Park (Huelva, Spain)

Wetlands span the surface/sub-surface interface, storing water at various times as groundwater, soil moisture and surface water. They are vital ecosystems that support wildlife and perform valuable ecosystem services, such as flood protection and water cleansing. They also provide livelihoods for millions of people who live within and around them. For example, the Inner Niger River Delta in the Western Sahel zone supports more than a million people who make their living as fishermen, cattle breeders or farmers, using the annual rise and fall of the river waters and its floodplains.

Wetlands are basically sponges that capture and slowly release large amounts of rain, snowmelt, groundwater and floodwater. Trees and other wetlands vegetation slow the speed of flood water and more evenly distribute it across the wetland. The combination of increased water storage and flood water hindrances lower flood heights and reduce erosion.

=== Ponds and tanks ===
Detention basins and water tanks can be defined as community-built and household water stores, filled by rainwater, groundwater infiltration or surface runoff. They are usually open, and therefore exposed to high levels of evaporation. They can be a great help to farmers in helping them overcome dry spells. However, they can promote vector-borne diseases such as malaria or schistosomiasis.

Detention basins are designed for temporary capture of flood waters and do not allow for permanent pooling of water and therefore do not make viable or reliable sources of water storage. Retention basins are similar to detention basins for flood control management, but are built for permanent pooling to control sediment and pollutants in the flood water.

=== Dams and reservoirs ===
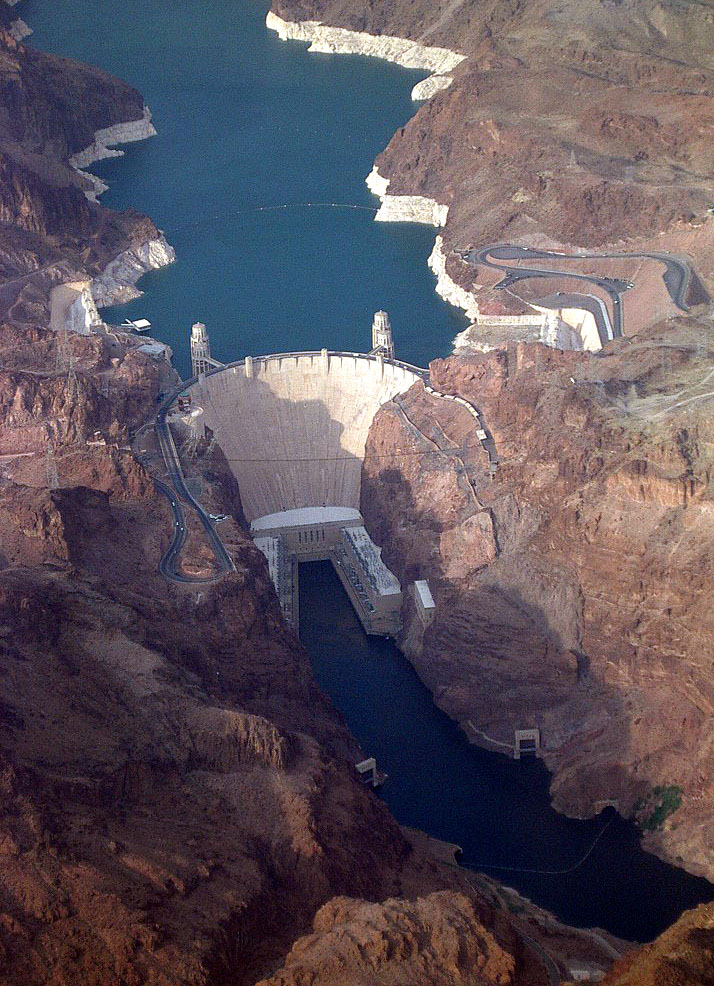
The Hoover Dam

In the past, large dams have often been the focus of water storage efforts. Many large dams and their reservoirs have brought significant social and economic benefits. For example, Egypt's Aswan High Dam, built in the 1960s, has protected the nation from drought and floods and supplies water used to irrigate some 15 million hectares. However, dams can also have great negative impacts. Because sediment is trapped by the Aswan High Dam, the Nile no longer delivers nutrients in large quantities to the floodplain. This has reduced soil fertility and increased the need for fertilizer. Water stored in dams and reservoirs can be treated for drinking water, but in the past due to poor taxation and high water prices in the US, water supply dams are unable to reach their intended levels of operation. Due to the increased surface area of water that dams create, huge amounts of water is lost to evaporation, much more so than what would have been lost from the river that flowed in its place.

== Planting basins ==
Rainfed agriculture constitutes 80% of global agriculture. Many of the 852 million poor people in the world live in parts of Asia and Africa that depend on rainfall to cultivate food crops. As the global population swells, more food will be needed, but climate variability is likely to make farming more difficult. A range of water stores could help farmers overcome dry spells that would otherwise cause their crops to fail. Field studies have shown the effectiveness of small-scale water storage. For example, using small planting basins to 'harvest' water in Zimbabwe have been shown to boost maize yields, whether rainfall is abundant or scarce. In Niger, they have led to three or fourfold increases in millet yields.

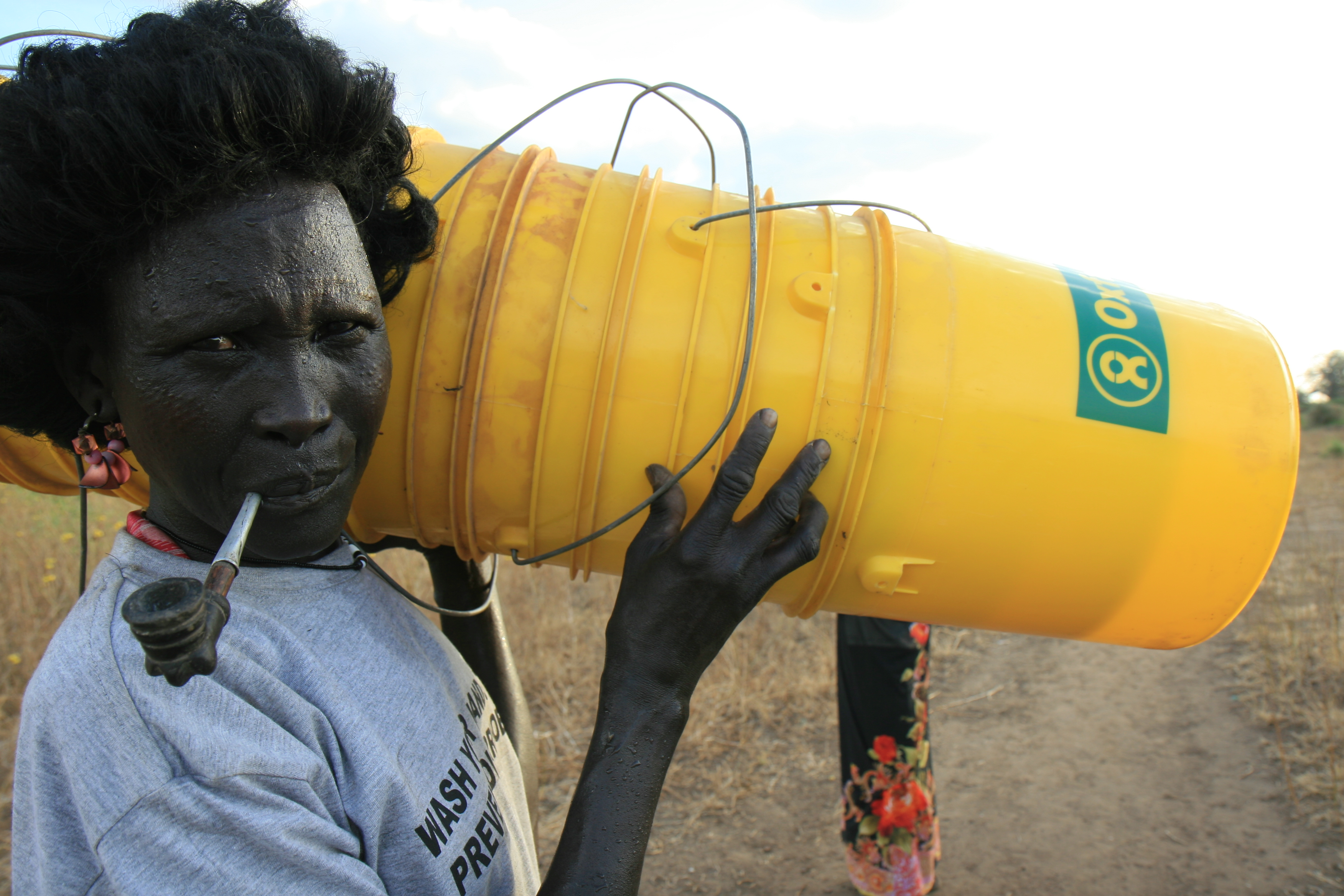
Nyalual Deng Joak carries a distribution of buckets back to her community. As well as constructing latrines and conducting health campaigns, Oxfam provides essential materials such as buckets, soap and mosquito nets that help people store water safely and protect family members from fatal illness.

== Contamination ==
As of 2010, it was reported that nearly half of the global population depends on in-home water storage due to a lack of adequate water supply networks. Many of the in-home solutions have improvised from available materials. It has been suggested that the lack of proper tools and equipment for construction, leads to a system more likely to contain breaches, making them more susceptible to contamination from the environment and users.

=== Common factors ===
- Roofing Materials: In certain parts of the world uncoated lead flashing is used as a roofing material. Researchers found on-site water storage of rainwater was more acidic, and contained elevated levels of heavy metals in a study conducted in Australia from 2005–2006.
- Hand-washing: When water is stored in tanks for consumption hand-washing can become a factor if the tank lacks a proper faucet system, or if there is a lack of education on the risks posed by using hands for water consumption. It was found in a 2009 study that water tanks in Tanzania contained 140-180% more fecal indicator bacteria than the water they were supplied with.
- Fertilizer Runoff

=== Common risks ===
- Fluorosis
- Arsenic Poisoning
- Bacteria and other organic contaminants

=== Decontamination ===
In the event that a water tank or tanker is contaminated, the following steps should be taken to reclaim the tank or tanker, if it is structurally intact. Additionally, it is recommended that tanks in continuous use are cleaned every five years, and for seasonal use, annually.

1. Clean: Drain the tank(er) of any remaining fluid, making sure to capture any hazardous fluid to be properly disposed of. Then scrub the inside of the tank with a detergent, and hot water mixture.
2. Disinfect: Fill the tank a quarter full with clean water. Sprinkle 80 grams of granular high-strength calcium hypochlorite (HSCH) into the tank for every 1000 litres total capacity of the tank. Fill the tank completely with clean water, close the lid and leave to stand for 24 hours.
3. Flush: After the chlorine solution has sat in the tank for 24 hours, flush out/empty the storage tank. Do not drain the tank into a septic system or adjacent surface water body. Continue flushing until the waste water is clear and no chlorine odor is detected.
4. Test: Once the storage tank has been thoroughly flushed, test for free chlorine residual to ensure it is non-detectable. Once a non-detectable chlorine residual has been obtained, collect operational & maintenance (O&M) total coliform bacteria water samples.

If the test results are negative for bacteria, the drinking water is considered safe to use and drink.

== See also ==
- Blue Nile
- Blue roof
- Drum (container)
- Pumped-storage hydroelectricity
- Volta River
- Water resources
