= Nambour =

- Town
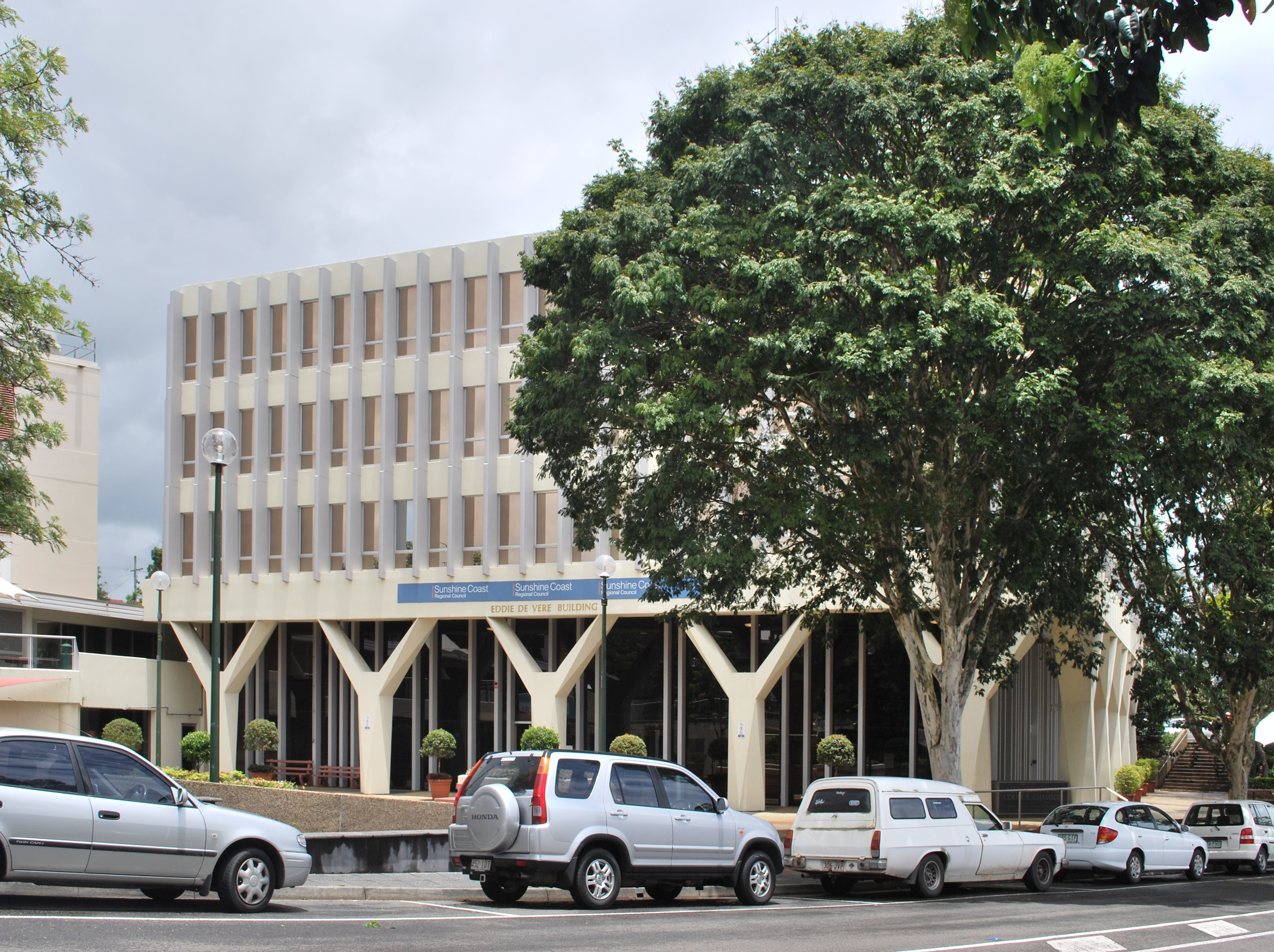
- Nambour's Sunshine Coast Regional Council offices

- Interactive map of Nambour
- Coordinates: 26.6269°S 152.9591°E
- Country: Australia
- State: Queensland
- City: Sunshine Coast
- LGA: Sunshine Coast Region
- Location: 15.4 km (9.6 mi) W of Maroochydore; 29.9 km (18.6 mi) NNW of Caloundra; 104 km (65 mi) N of Brisbane
- Established: 1870

Government
  - State electorate: Nicklin
  - Federal division: Fairfax

Area
  - Total: 11.4 km^{2} (4.4 sq mi)
- Elevation: 36 m (118 ft)

Population
  - Total: 12,145 (2021 census)
  - Density: 1,065/km^{2} (2,759/sq mi)
- Time zone: UTC+10:00 (AEST)
- Postcode: 4560
- Mean max temp: 25.8 °C (78.4 °F)
- Mean min temp: 14.0 °C (57.2 °F)
- Annual rainfall: 1,694 mm (66.7 in)
Localities around Nambour
Image Flat	Parklands	Bli Bli
Highworth	Nambour	Rosemount
Burnside	Coes Creek	Woombye

Nambour is a rural town and locality in the Sunshine Coast Region, Queensland, Australia. In the 2021 census, the locality of Nambour had a population of 12,145 people.

== Geography ==
Nambour is 101 kilometres (63 mi) north of the state capital, Brisbane. The town lies in the sub-tropical hinterland of the Sunshine Coast at the foot of the Blackall Range. It was the administrative centre and capital of the Maroochy Shire and is now the administrative centre of the Sunshine Coast Region. The greater Nambour region includes surrounding suburbs such as Burnside, Coes Creek, and Perwillowen.

Nambour–Mapleton Road exits to the west and Nambour–Bli Bli Road to the east.

== Etymology ==
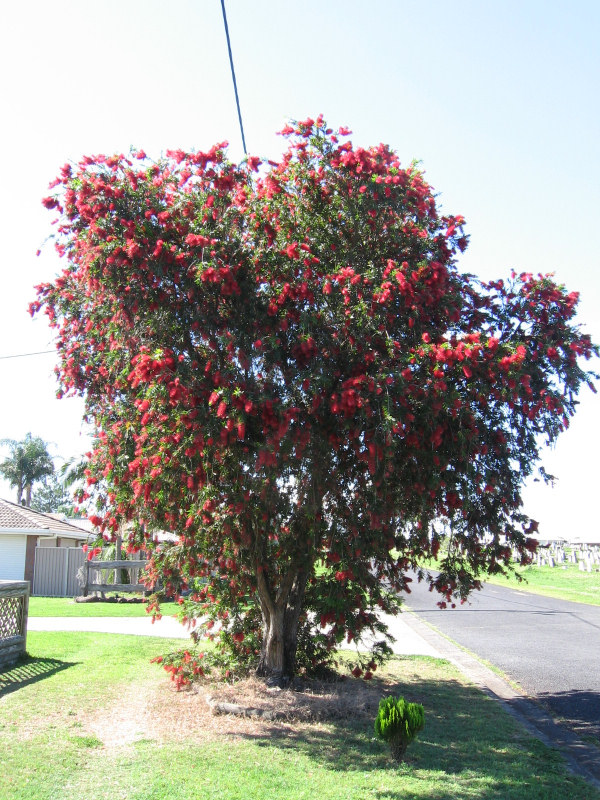
Red flowering bottle brush Callistemon viminalis after which Nambour is named

The name is derived from the Aboriginal word "naamba", referring to the red-flowering bottle brush Callistemon viminalis.

== History ==
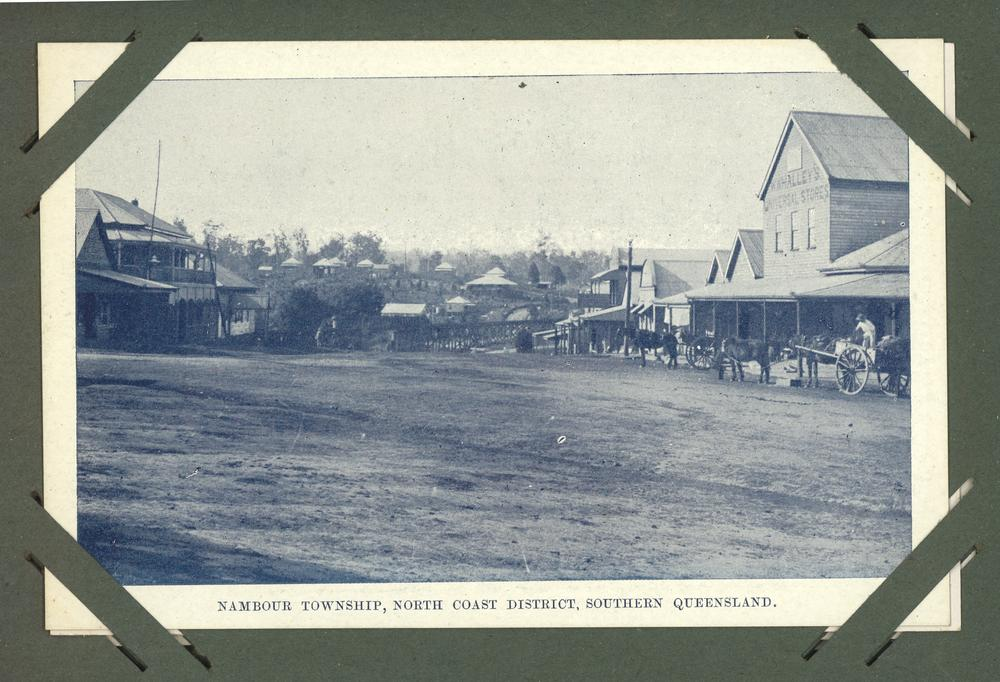
Main street in 1905

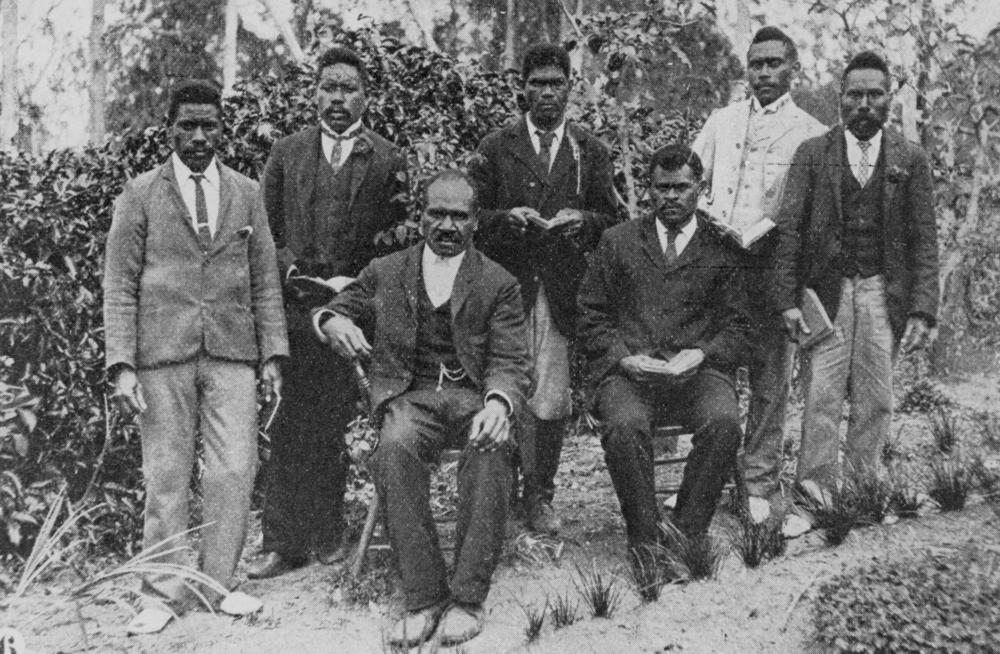
South Sea Islanders in Nambour 1906

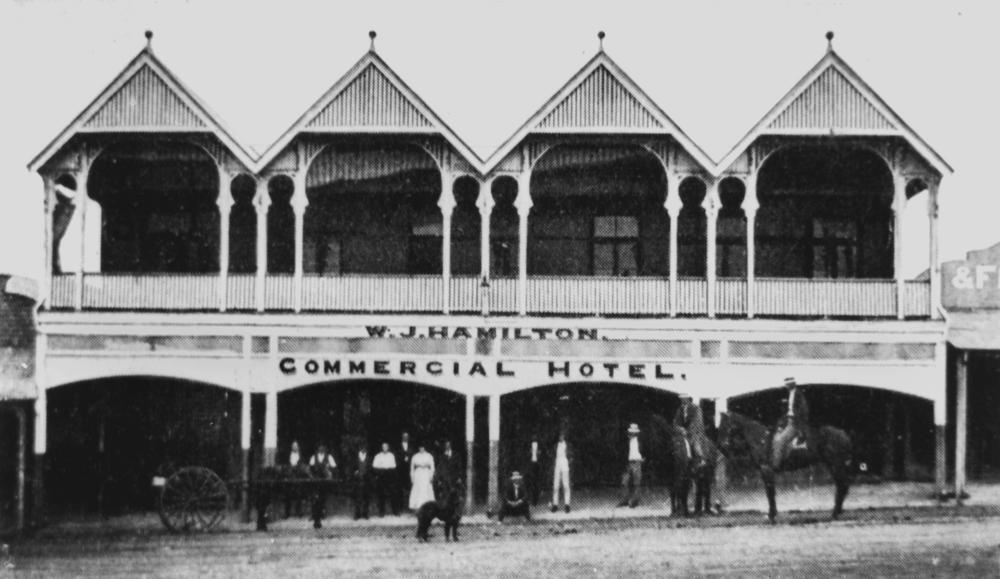
Commercial Hotel 1917

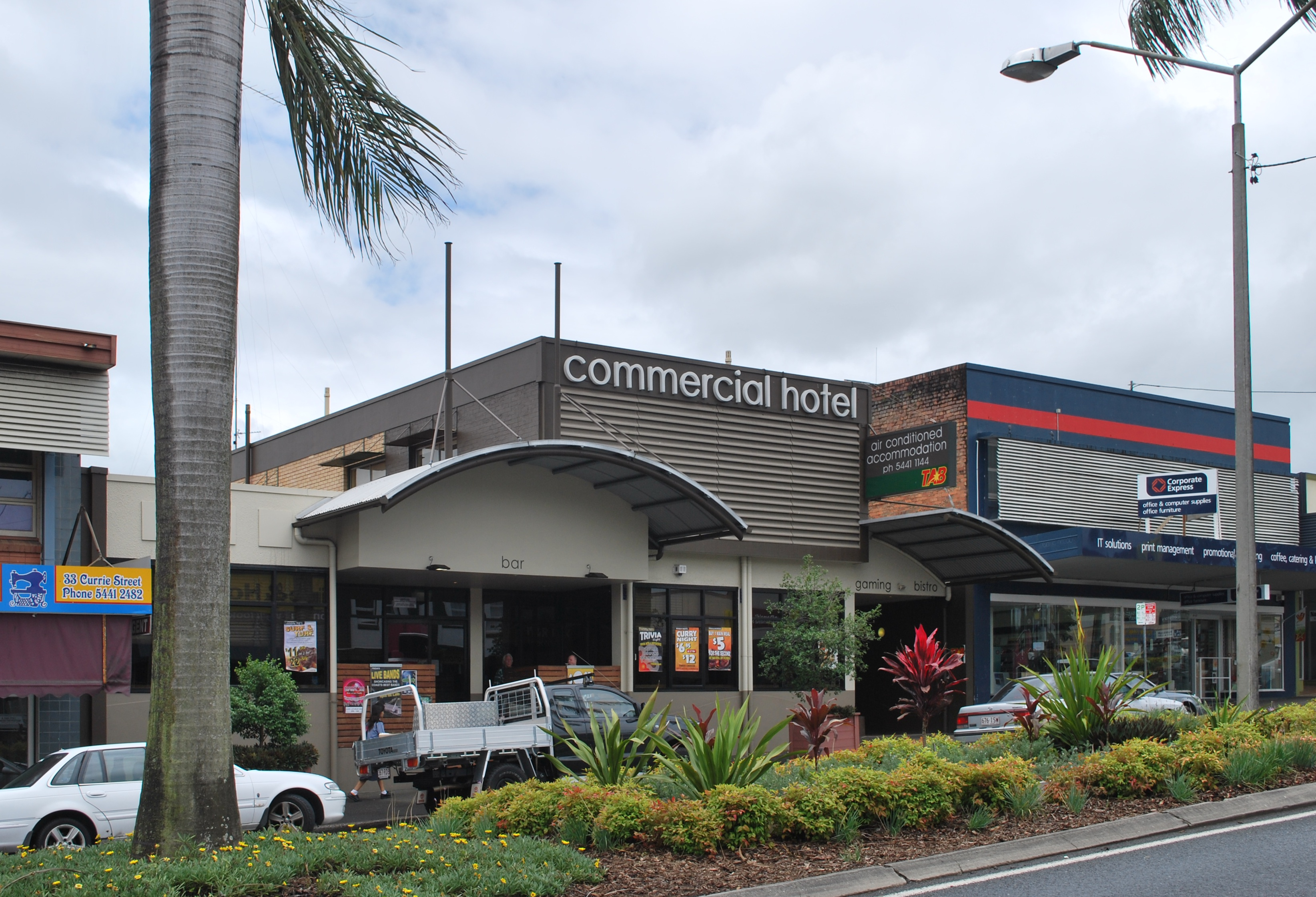
Commercial Hotel today

In 1862, Tom Petrie with 25 Turrbal and Kabi Kabi men including Ker-Walli, Wanangga and Billy Dinghy entered Petrie's Creek with the view to exploit the large cedar growing in the vicinity. They encountered some resident Aboriginal people with whom they had a traditional ceremony together. Petrie's group afterwards made a permanent logging camp further up the creek in the area now known as Nambour. At this camp, the Aboriginal workers requested that Petrie brand them with his logging symbol. With a piece of prepared glass, he cut his logging symbol of a P inside a circle into each of the men's arms. These Aboriginal workers, as well as local Maroochy men such as Puram, worked hard, returning frequently with Petrie to build the roadway, fell the timber and transport the logs downriver. The Nambour area had its first permanent European settlement in 1870. The town was then still just called Petrie's Creek.

Maroochy Provisional School opened on 13 October 1879. It was renamed Nambour Provisional School in 1891. It became Nambour State School in 1897. It had a secondary school department from circa 1940 until 2 February 1953, when Nambour State High School opened on 2 February 1953.

Petrie's Creek Post Office opened on 1 June 1888 (a receiving office had been open from 1885, originally known as Carrollo) and was renamed Nambour by 1890.

In 1890 the Maroochy Divisional Board was established.

In 1891, the North Coast railway to Brisbane was completed, and at its opening Petrie's Creek was renamed "Nambour", after the Nambour cattle station.

On Monday 2 January 1893, St Joseph's Catholic Church was officially opened by Archbishop Robert Dunne. It was at 177 Currie Street (26.6300°S 152.9604°E) on a 5-acre (2.0 ha) site donated by Daniel Currie (after whom Currie Street was named). It was 30 by 20 feet (9.1 by 6.1 m). Circa 1950, it was demolished to make way for a new church. The timber from the demolished church was used to construct Our Lady Star of the Sea (Stella Maris) in Maroochydore as a cost-saving measure. On Sunday 16 April 1950, Archbishop James Duhig laid the foundation stone for the new St Joseph's. On Sunday 1 July 1951, Duhig returned to bless and dedicate the new St Joseph's Church.

The Moreton Central Sugar Mill Cane Tramway was constructed from 1897. It was used to transport passengers and sugar cane. The tramway closed at the end of 2001. Much of the track and signal lighting still remains. A section of the track can still be seen in central Nambour along the roadway of Mill, Currie and Howard Streets.

Nambour Baptist Church opened in July 1914 on the corner of Currie Street and Mill Street (approx 26.6268°S 152.9588°E). On 25 August 1921 a new church was opened. Another new church opened on Sunday 2 November 1952 on the south-west corner of Currie and Bury Streets (26.6281°S 152.9591°E). Circa 1970s the site was used to construct a new library.

A fire in 1924 destroyed many of the timber buildings along the main street.

The Nambour branch of the Queensland Country Women's Association was founded on 1 November 1928. In 1931 they established their QCWA Rest Rooms in the Shire Hall. In September 1958 they officially opened their own building at 10 Short Street (still in use today).

Nambour Hospital opened as Maroochy District Hospital in 1930, renamed Nambour General Hospital in 1958. Historical milestones for Nambour Hospital were as follows: Block 1 completed (1975), Block 2 completed (1986), dialysis unit opens (1989), Block 6 opened (1993–95), Block 7 built (1998), and Block 1 demolished (2023) for redevelopment. Much of Nambour Hospital's acute services relocated to Sunshine Coast University Hospital upon its opening in 2017.

St Joseph's Primary School was opened on 2 February 1925 by the Good Samaritan Sisters. From 1940 to 1977 it also provided secondary schooling, an arrangement that ended when St Joseph's High School was established in 1977.

Nambour State High School opened on 2 February 1953.

Nambour Infants State School opened on 23 January 1961 and closed on 12 December 1980.

In 1977 the Catholic Education Office established St Joseph's High School. In 1979 it moved to a new location in Burnside and in 1985 was renamed St John's College.

The Nambour Public Library opened in 1982 and had a major refurbishment in 1998 with a minor refurbishment in 2016.

The Nambour Bypass opened in 1990, shifting long-distance highway traffic around the town and turning the former highway route into Nambour Connection Road.

Nambour Centre for Continuing Secondary Education opened on 4 February 1991. It was subsequently amalgamated into the Nambour State College.

The Nambour & District Historical Museum, more widely known as the Nambour Museum began with an opening ceremony held on 20 April 1996.

== Demographics ==
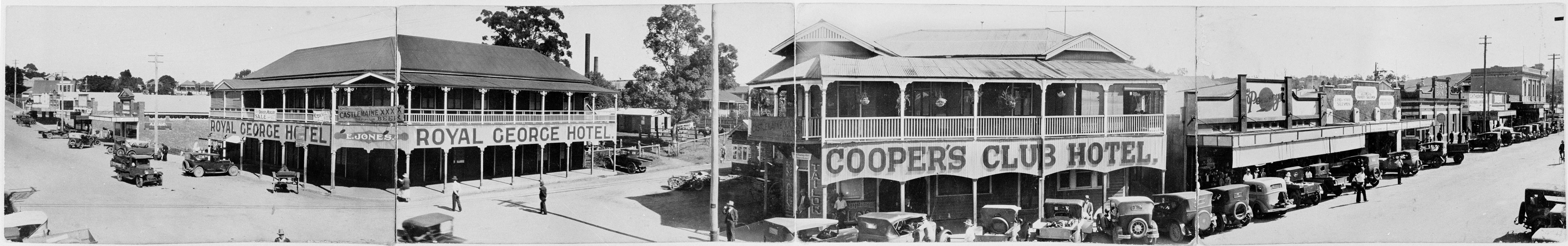
Currie Street 1932, incl. The Royal George Hotel

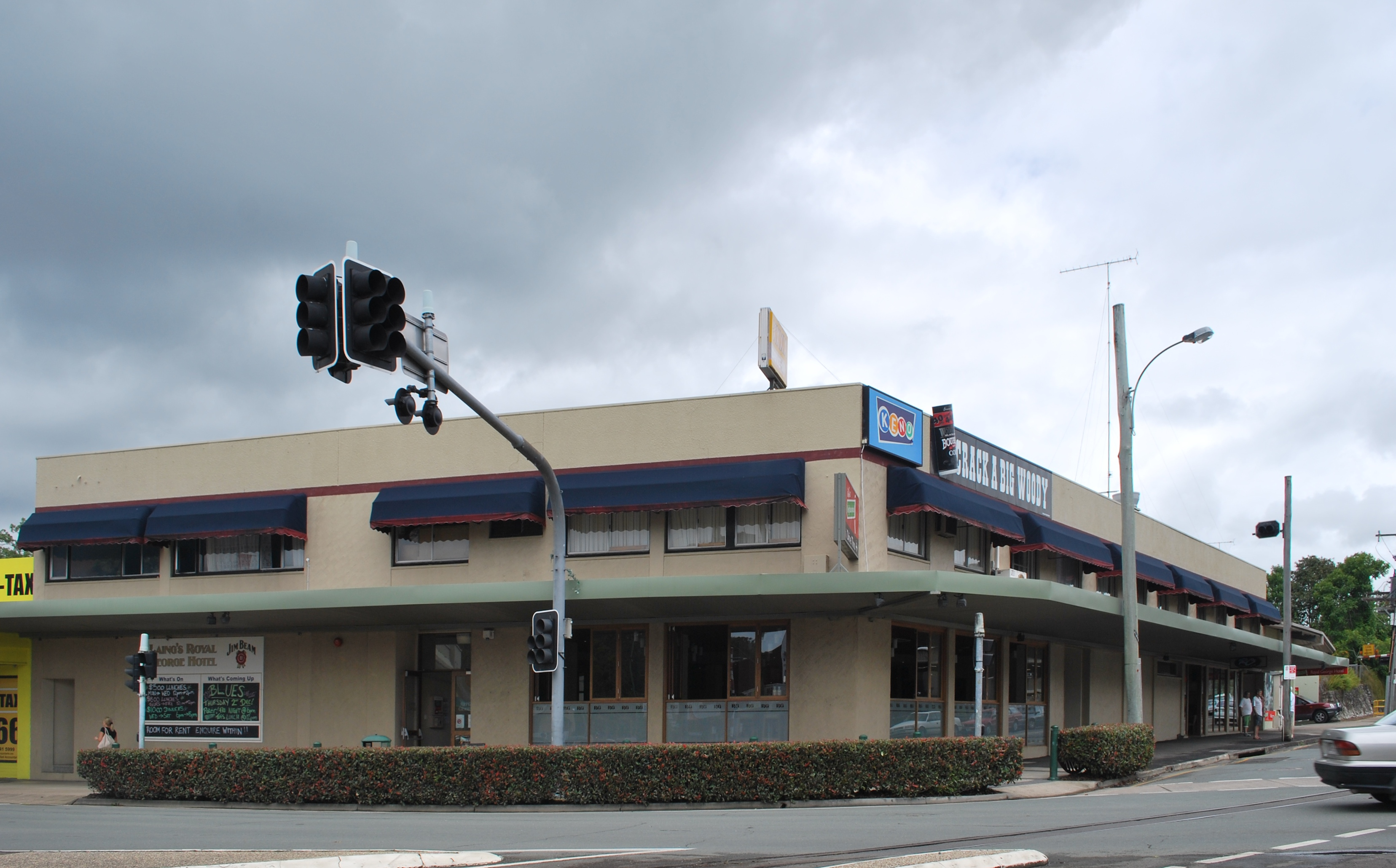
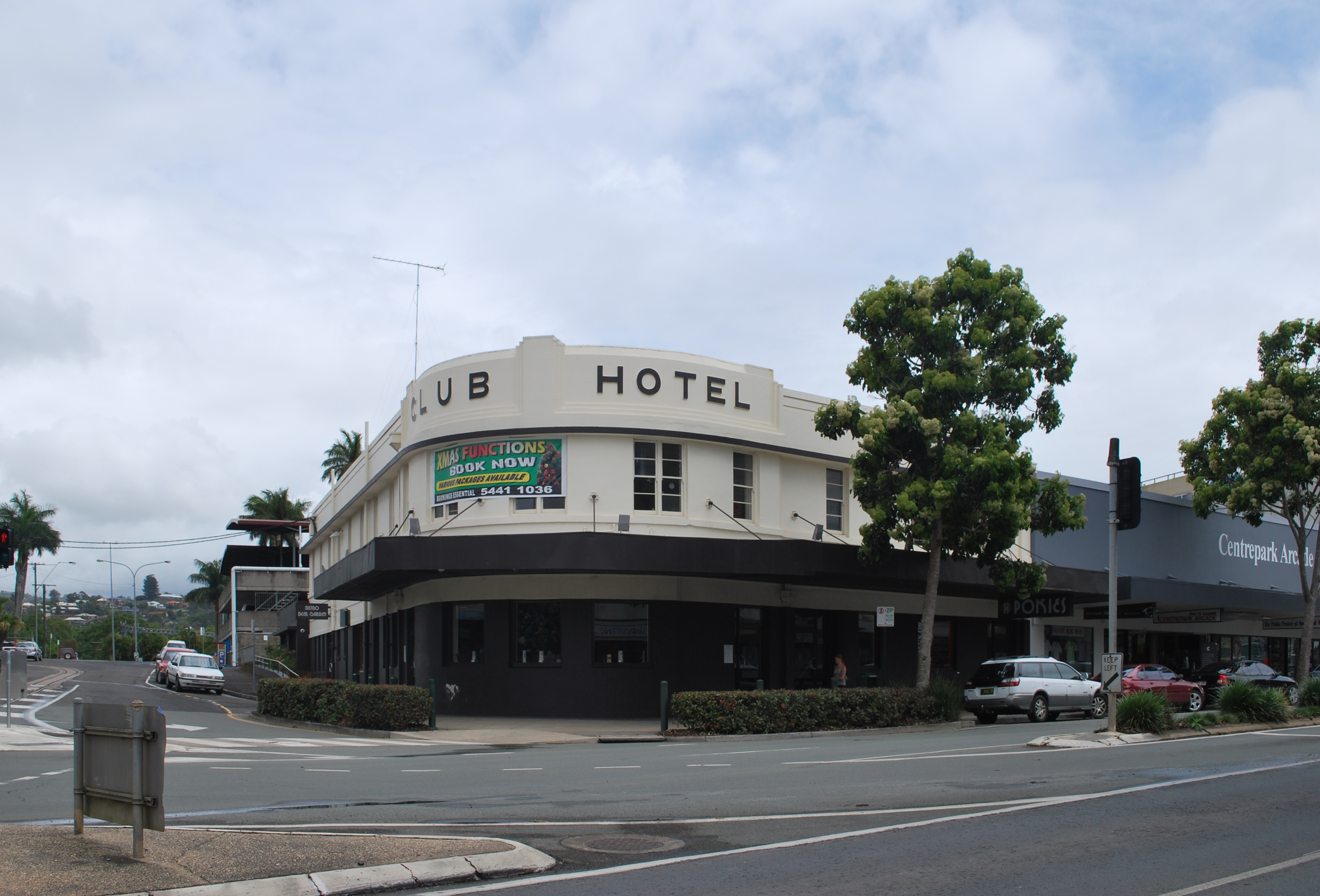
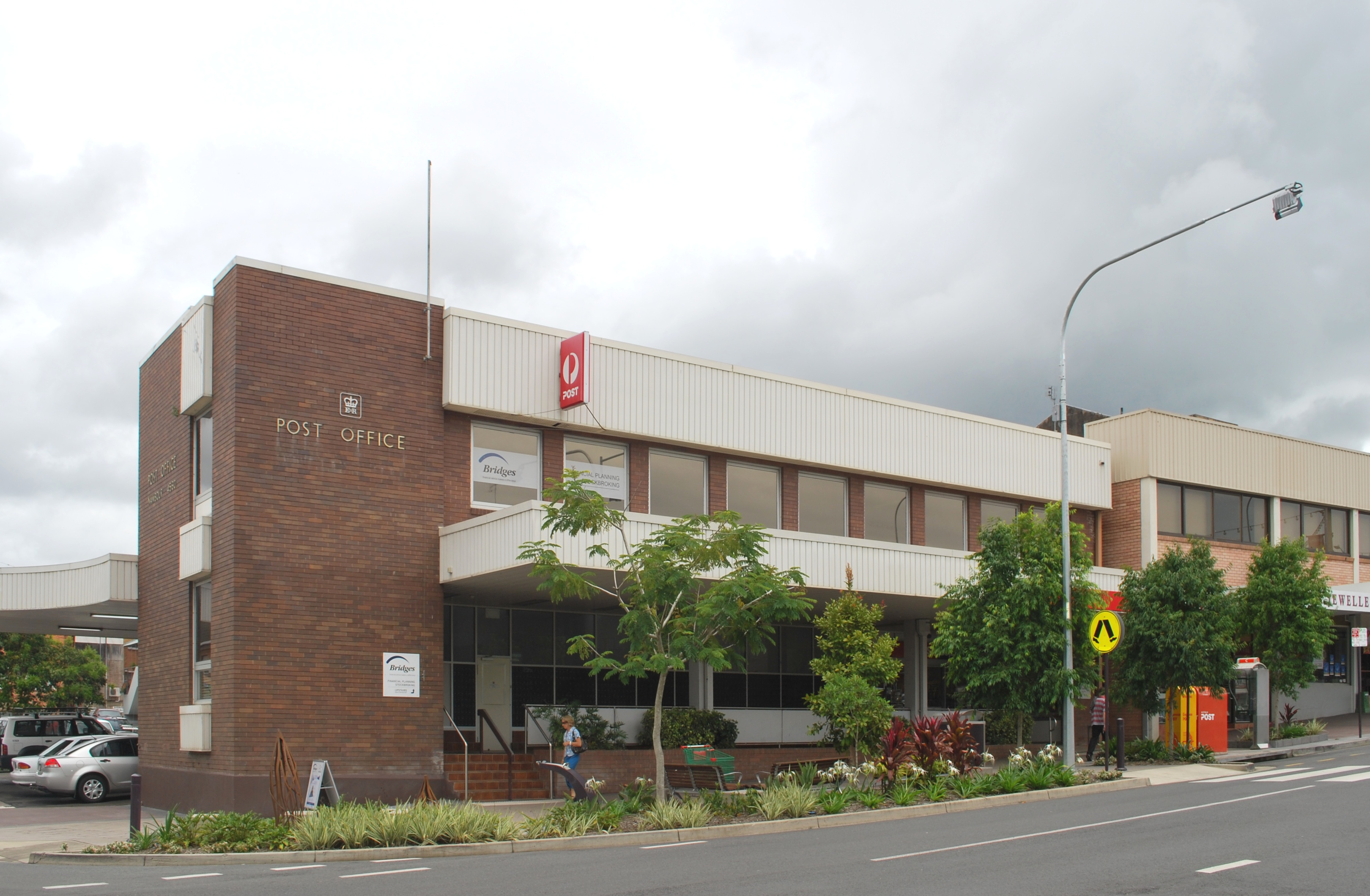
Royal George Hotel, Club Hotel and Post Office on Currie Street in 2010

In the 2011 census, the locality of Nambour had a population of 10,221 people.

In the 2016 census, the locality of Nambour had a population of 11,187 people. 52.9% of the population were female and 47.1% were male. The median age was 40 years. Aboriginal and Torres Strait Islander people made up 4.4% of the population. 77.1% of people were born in Australia. The next most common countries of birth were England 4.0% and New Zealand 3.6%. 87.7% of people spoke only English at home. The most common responses for religion were No Religion 33.5%, Catholic 16.0% and Anglican 13.5%.

In the 2021 census, the locality of Nambour had a population of 12,145 people.

== Heritage listings ==
Nambour has a number of heritage-listed sites, including:

- Mill Street, Currie Street, Howard Street: Moreton Central Sugar Mill Cane Tramway
- 17 & 19 Mill Street, and 14 & 16 Bury Street: former Moreton Central Sugar Mill Worker's Housing

Another heritage listing associated with the Moreton Central Sugar Mill is the

- Store Road, Maroochy River: Tramway Lift Bridge over Maroochy River

== Politics ==
Nambour is represented by the following politicians:

Government	Division	Member	Party	Term
Federal	Fairfax	Ted O'Brien	Liberal National Party of Queensland	2016–present
State	Nicklin	Marty Hunt	Liberal National Party of Queensland	2024–present
Local	Division 10 – Sunshine Coast	Cr David Law		2020–present

== Economy ==
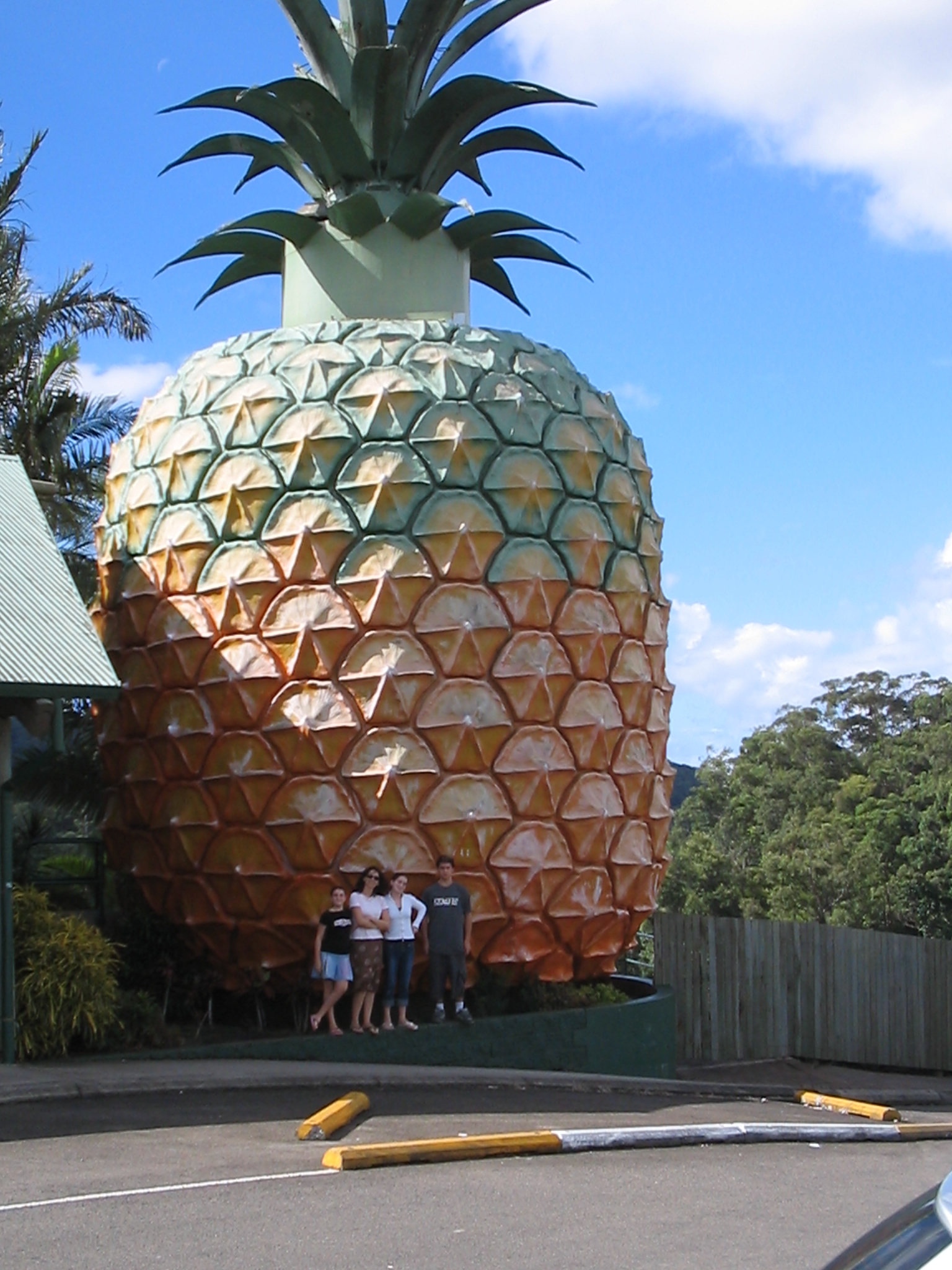
The Big Pineapple

Nambour's primary industry has been sugar, with extensive cane fields surrounding the town, and the Moreton Central Sugar Mill in the town centre. The mill itself began operating in 1897 until it was closed in 2003.

The future of the sugar industry in the area is in doubt, with a number of former cane farms being converted to grazing cattle, turf farms or sold to property developers. Other industries in the area include tourism, and the growing of tropical fruits.

Situated near Nambour is the Queensland Government's Maroochy Research Station which is a major subtropical fruit and nut research and extension centre. The 61 ha research facility was established in 1945, and has an office and laboratory complex, glasshouses, netted orchards, postharvest coolrooms and a biotechnology facility. With access to national and international funding sources, specialist staff often work in conjunction with investigators from other research agencies.

== Education ==
Nambour State College is a government primary and secondary (Prep–12) school for boys and girls at 1 Carroll Street (26.6232°S 152.9623°E). In 2017, the school had an enrolment of 1,538 students with 147 teachers (134 full-time equivalent) and 83 non-teaching staff (60 full-time equivalent). Its primary (Prep–6) campus is at Coronation Avenue (26.6212°S 152.9646°E). The school has a primary and secondary special education program. It also has a primary and secondary Intensive English program.

St Joseph's Primary School is a Catholic primary (Prep–6) school for boys and girls at 177 Currie Street (26.6300°S 152.9601°E). In 2017, the school had an enrolment of 396 students with 23 teachers (21 full-time equivalent) and 19 non-teaching staff (11 full-time equivalent).

The Nambour campus of OneSchool Global (formerly known as the Agnew School) is a private primary and secondary school (3–12) for boys and girls at 281 Windsor Road (26.6209°S 152.9345°E). It is operated by the Plymouth Brethren Christian Church. As at 26 October 2024, it had an enrolment of 35 students.

In addition, other suburbs of Nambour include the following schools:

- Burnside:
  - Burnside State School (primary)
  - Burnside State High School (secondary)
  - Nambour Special School on Windsor Drive for children aged 5 to 18 years.
  - St John's College (Catholic secondary)
  - Sunshine Coast Institute of TAFE has its largest campus in Nambour.
- Kureelpa
  - Blackall Range Independent School (primary and secondary)
- Woombye
  - Woombye State School (primary)
  - Nambour Christian College (primary and secondary)
  - Suncoast Christian College (primary and secondary)

== Facilities ==
=== Health ===
Nambour General Hospital is located on Hospital Road and provides a range of acute and subacute services within the Sunshine Coast Hospital and Health Service.

The regions first major private hospital, Nambour Selangor Private Hospital, opened in 1960. It is located on Netherton Street.

=== Electricity ===
The distribution network company that provides electricity to Nambour residents is Energex. On 1 July 2010, Sunshine Coast Regional Council's Water Services (along with Moreton Bay Regional Council), moved over to the recently created water body, Unity Water. Unity Water was created by the Queensland Government as part of the State's takeover of South East Queensland's water facilities, dams and water supply networks. Moreton Bay and Sunshine Coast Regional Councils own 50% of Unity Water.

=== Media ===
The daily local newspaper is the Sunshine Coast Daily which is published by APN News & Media. There is also a weekly news service provided by the Nambour Weekly which is published on Wednesdays. The Nambour Chronicle was published from 1903 until it ceased publication in the 1980s.

Nambour is also in the television broadcast licence areas of Brisbane (metro), enabling most areas of the Sunshine Coast to receive the commercial Brisbane stations.

Many community access stations, as well as some Brisbane stations can also be received.

== Amenities ==
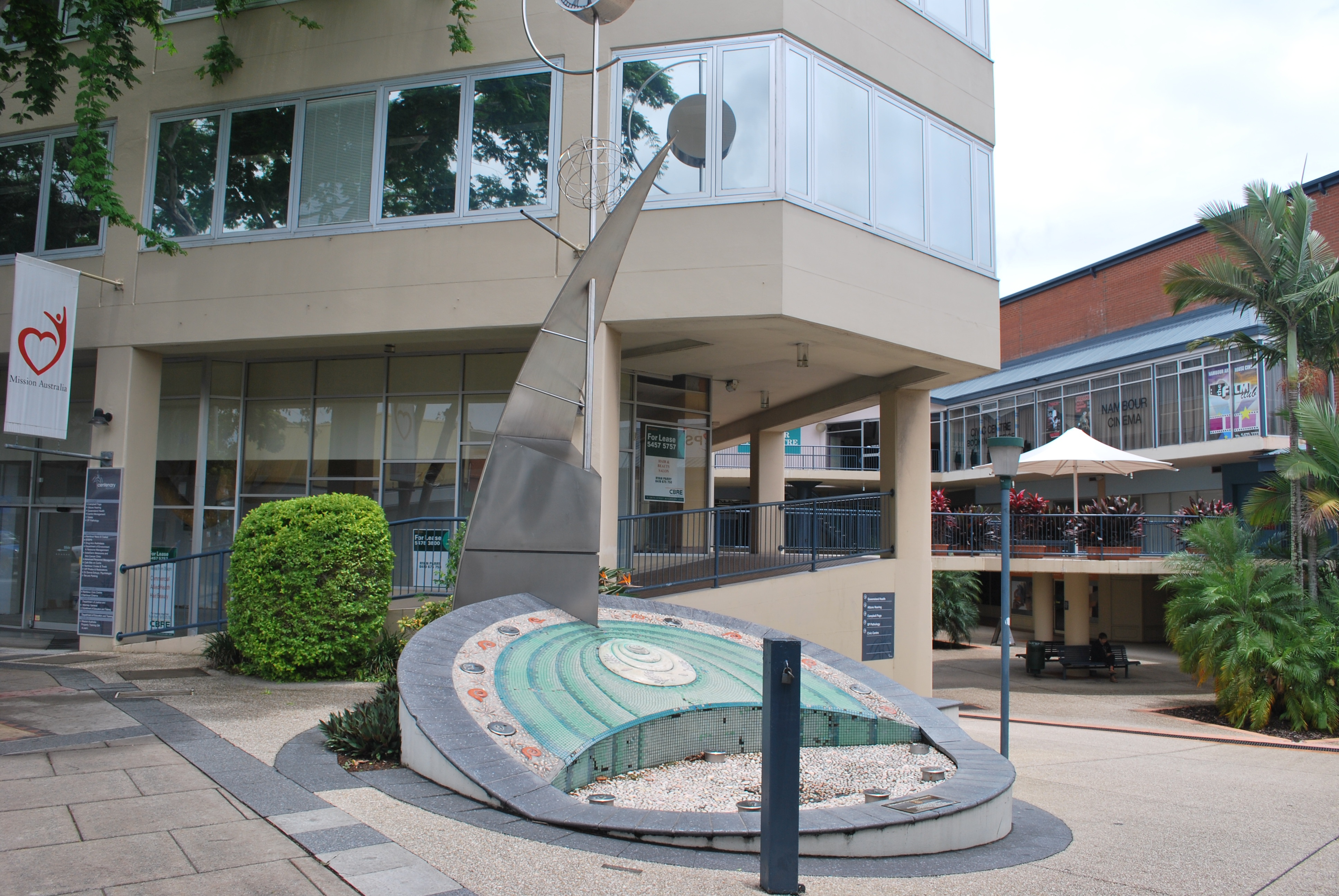
A sculpture in Nambour

The Nambour Civic Centre is an arts and entertainment venue that includes cinema, music, theatre, dance and other events. The Nambour Lind Lane Theatre is another live theatre venue.

The Sunshine Coast Regional Council operates a public library in Nambour at the corner of Bury and Currie Streets.

The Nambour branch of the Queensland Country Women's Association meets at 10 Short Street.

Nambour Wesleyan Methodist Church is at 165 Perwillowen Road, Perwillowen. It is part of the Wesleyan Methodist Church of Australia.

The main shopping areas in Nambour are Nambour Plaza which has approximately 40 stores, Nambour Mill Village Shopping Centre and Centenary Square Shopping Centre.

Nambour boasts a high proportion of parkland, covering approximately 9% of its total land size. This makes it one of the areas with the highest percentage of parkland in the Sunshine Coast region.

== Sport ==
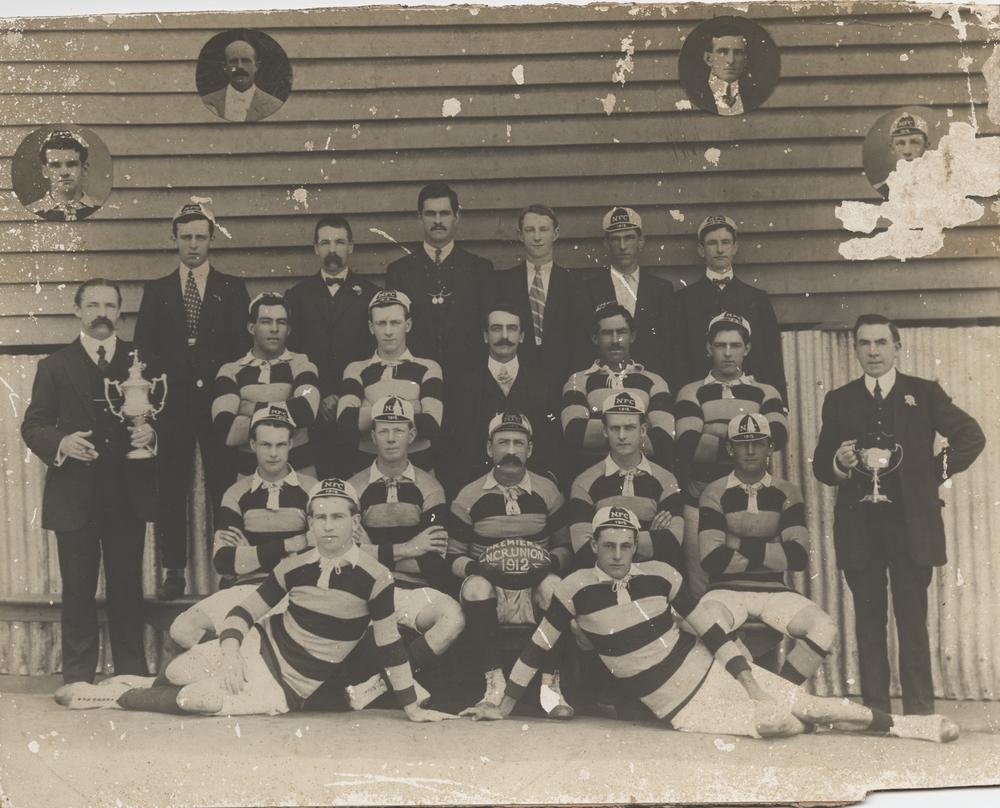
Nambour Rugby Union Premiers 1912

Nambour has a number of amateur sporting clubs including:

- Nambour–Yandina United Football Club
- Nambour and District Tennis Association
- Nambas Tennis Club.
- Nambour Golf Club

The Nambour Wildcats Soccer Club is part of the Sunshine Coast Churches Soccer Association and was established in 1976, it is one of the largest sporting clubs in the region with over 350 players from U6 to senior Mens, Ladies and Over 35's.

The Nambour Crushers Rugby League Club was established in 1985. The grounds are situated at 22 Crusher Park Drive. The Crushers have teams in all grades from Under 7s to A Grade and number approximately 300 players.

The Nambour Rugby Union Club entered the Sunshine Coast District Rugby Union Competition in 1981. The club is known as the "Toads". The club's ground is situated on Laidlaw Road in nearby Woombye. Nambour fields four "Senior" sides in the Sunshine Coast Competition: A Grade, Reserve Grade and U19's as well as a women's team. A junior club with teams from under 7s through to under 17s also runs. Nambour were local premiers in 1912 and 1913.

The Nambour and Districts Netball Association is made up of clubs from Yandina, Burnside, Nambour, Woombye, Palmwoods and the school based Saints club.

Nambour Cricket Club is part of the Sunshine Coast Cricket Association and has played on the Nambour showgrounds since the early 1890s when a Nambour team competed against teams from nearby towns.

The Nambour Aquatic Centre is located in Petrie Park and has heated pools all year round. The complex offers a variety of activities including a 50m heated pool, a 25m heated enclosed pool, toddler pools and fountains/play area, a learn to swim program, aqua aerobics classes, and a poolside cafe.

== Attractions ==
The Big Pineapple tourist attraction on the southern outskirts of the town reflects both of these pursuits.

Other tourist attractions include Thrill Hill Waterslide Park, and the Big Macadamia nut.

== Events ==
The Big Pineapple Music Festival attracts thousands of visitors to Nambour.

Nambour Originals (sibling of Peregian Originals held at Peregian Beach) is an open air community event that involves live music in a picnic style format. It is held at 1pm every 2nd and 4th Sunday of each month at Quota Park Amphitheatre on Matthews Street. The facilities at Quota Park include barbecues, a sheltered area, shady trees, a kids play area, toilets and parking.

The Nambour Festival, which began as the Nambour Sugar Festival in the 1980s, has been held at Quota Park since 2008. The festival showcases local musicians, entertainers, cooking demonstrations, local produce, a diverse range of activities for children, and market stalls.

The Sunshine Coast Agricultural Show was first held in 1905 in Woombye. The first show in Nambour was held in 1909. Today, the Sunshine Coast Agricultural Show is a modern three-day show full of agricultural, community and entertainment events.

The Queensland Home Garden Expo is a three-day gardening event held at the Nambour Showgrounds.

== Transport ==
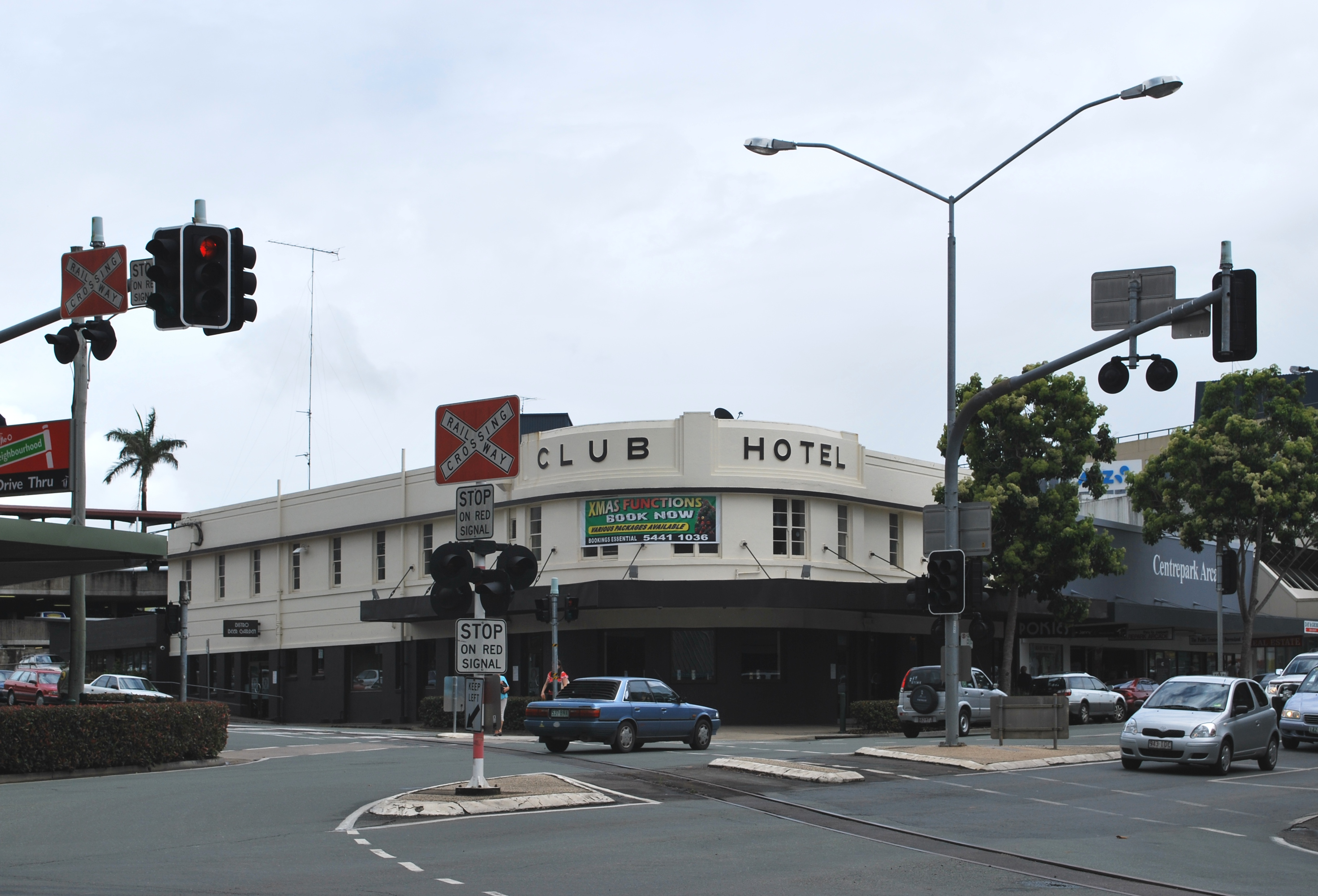
Railway lines run through the centre of Nambour

Translink is the authority that coordinates and integrates the public rail and bus services in South East Queensland, of which Nambour is in Zone 6.

Nambour is serviced by several Queensland Rail passenger trains, including the Tilt Train and is approximately one and a half hours north of Brisbane by rail. Regular services depart from Nambour railway station and use the Sunshine Coast line.

The region connected to Brisbane via the Bruce Highway which forms part of the M1 motorway.

Greyhound Australia interstate coach operators also operate daily bus services to Brisbane using the major corridors. The local bus service is operated by Kinetic Sunshine Coast which has various routes between Nambour and Noosa and the Sunshine Coast, including one via Eumundi.

Nambour is also served by Sunshine Coast Airport. The airport is approximately 25 minutes east of Nambour by car. Brisbane Airport is approximately one hour and ten minutes south of Nambour by car.

== Climate ==
Nambour experiences a humid subtropical climate (Köppen: Cfa), with hot, wet summers and mild winters.

Climate data for Nambour (26º38'24"S, 152º56'24"E, 33 m AMSL) (1952–2007 normals and extremes)
Month	Jan	Feb	Mar	Apr	May	Jun	Jul	Aug	Sep	Oct	Nov	Dec	Year
Record high °C (°F)	40.8 (105.4)	40.5 (104.9)	37.5 (99.5)	34.5 (94.1)	30.6 (87.1)	28.6 (83.5)	28.7 (83.7)	32.0 (89.6)	35.4 (95.7)	39.9 (103.8)	40.5 (104.9)	40.5 (104.9)	40.8 (105.4)
Mean daily maximum °C (°F)	29.3 (84.7)	28.8 (83.8)	27.9 (82.2)	26.2 (79.2)	23.7 (74.7)	21.6 (70.9)	21.1 (70.0)	22.5 (72.5)	24.8 (76.6)	26.7 (80.1)	27.9 (82.2)	29.1 (84.4)	25.8 (78.4)
Mean daily minimum °C (°F)	19.3 (66.7)	19.6 (67.3)	18.2 (64.8)	15.4 (59.7)	12.0 (53.6)	9.2 (48.6)	7.6 (45.7)	7.9 (46.2)	10.5 (50.9)	13.8 (56.8)	16.2 (61.2)	18.0 (64.4)	14.0 (57.2)
Record low °C (°F)	12.0 (53.6)	11.9 (53.4)	10.0 (50.0)	5.8 (42.4)	1.3 (34.3)	−2.3 (27.9)	−2.9 (26.8)	−0.9 (30.4)	0.3 (32.5)	2.2 (36.0)	5.4 (41.7)	5.9 (42.6)	−2.9 (26.8)
Average precipitation mm (inches)	229.5 (9.04)	259.1 (10.20)	227.9 (8.97)	143.7 (5.66)	135.5 (5.33)	87.9 (3.46)	82.6 (3.25)	59.8 (2.35)	49.2 (1.94)	104.0 (4.09)	137.9 (5.43)	174.4 (6.87)	1,693.9 (66.69)
Average precipitation days (≥ 1.0 mm)	11.1	12.8	13.3	9.8	9.0	6.3	5.5	5.0	5.3	8.0	8.9	9.9	104.9
Average afternoon relative humidity (%)	65	67	67	64	61	57	52	50	50	57	59	63	59
Average dew point °C (°F)	20.1 (68.2)	20.1 (68.2)	19.1 (66.4)	16.5 (61.7)	13.8 (56.8)	10.8 (51.4)	9.0 (48.2)	9.2 (48.6)	11.1 (52.0)	14.6 (58.3)	16.6 (61.9)	18.8 (65.8)	15.0 (59.0)
Mean monthly sunshine hours	204.6	158.2	198.4	219.0	204.6	201.0	223.2	241.8	246.0	232.5	237.0	226.3	2,592.6
Percentage possible sunshine	48	43	52	64	61	64	68	70	69	59	59	53	59
Source: Bureau of Meteorology (1953–2007 normals and extremes)

== Notable people ==
=== Entertainment ===
- Sam Atwell, actor
- Mike Chapman, record producer and songwriter who was a major force in the British pop music industry in the 1970s
- Jon Coghill, Powderfinger drummer
- Judith Durham, lead vocalist for The Seekers
- Benjamin Law, writer, author and comedian
- Ivan Sen, filmmaker

=== Politics ===
- Carolyn Male, member of the Legislative Assembly of Queensland from 2001 to 2012
- Kevin Rudd, former prime minister and former foreign minister, was born in Nambour and attended Nambour State High School
- Fiona Simpson, Queensland Speaker, attended Nambour State High School
- Wayne Swan, former deputy prime minister and former treasurer, attended Nambour State High School

=== Sport ===
- Scott Anderson, rugby league
- Ian Baker-Finch, 1991 British Open winner
- Lee Carseldine, cricketer
- Larissa Crummer, soccer player for Australia
- Jake Friend, rugby league
- Angela Kennedy, Olympic swimmer
- Alastair MacKellar, professional cyclist
- Rhys Magin, Australian rules footballer
- Reed Mahoney, rugby league
- Casey McGuire, rugby league
- Ashley Noffke, cricketer
- Joel Parkinson, surfer
- Pat Rafter, tennis player made his debut in Nambour. His name has been on the wall of the local tennis club since he won the junior championship as a sixteen-year-old.
- Clint Robinson, canoeist
- Billy Slater, rugby league, was born in Nambour
- Tia-Clair Toomey, 6 time CrossFit Games champion
- Sharni Webb, Australian rules footballer

=== Other ===
- Max Gaylard, United Nations Assistant Secretary-General currently working as deputy special coordinator for the Middle East Peace Process and United Nations coordinator for humanitarian and development activities in the Occupied Palestinian Territory.
- Daniel Keighran, awarded Australia's military highest honour, the Victoria Cross for Australia for bravery during the Battle of Derapet in Afghanistan in 2010.
- Michael Wesley, deputy vice-chancellor international, Melbourne University and former executive director of the Lowy Institute for International Policy.
- David Billings, Amelia Earhart Researcher and author of the "Earhart Lockheed Electra Search Project" website.

== See also ==
- List of largest roadside attractions
- List of tramways in Queensland
- Blackall Range road network
