= List of sugar mills in Queensland =

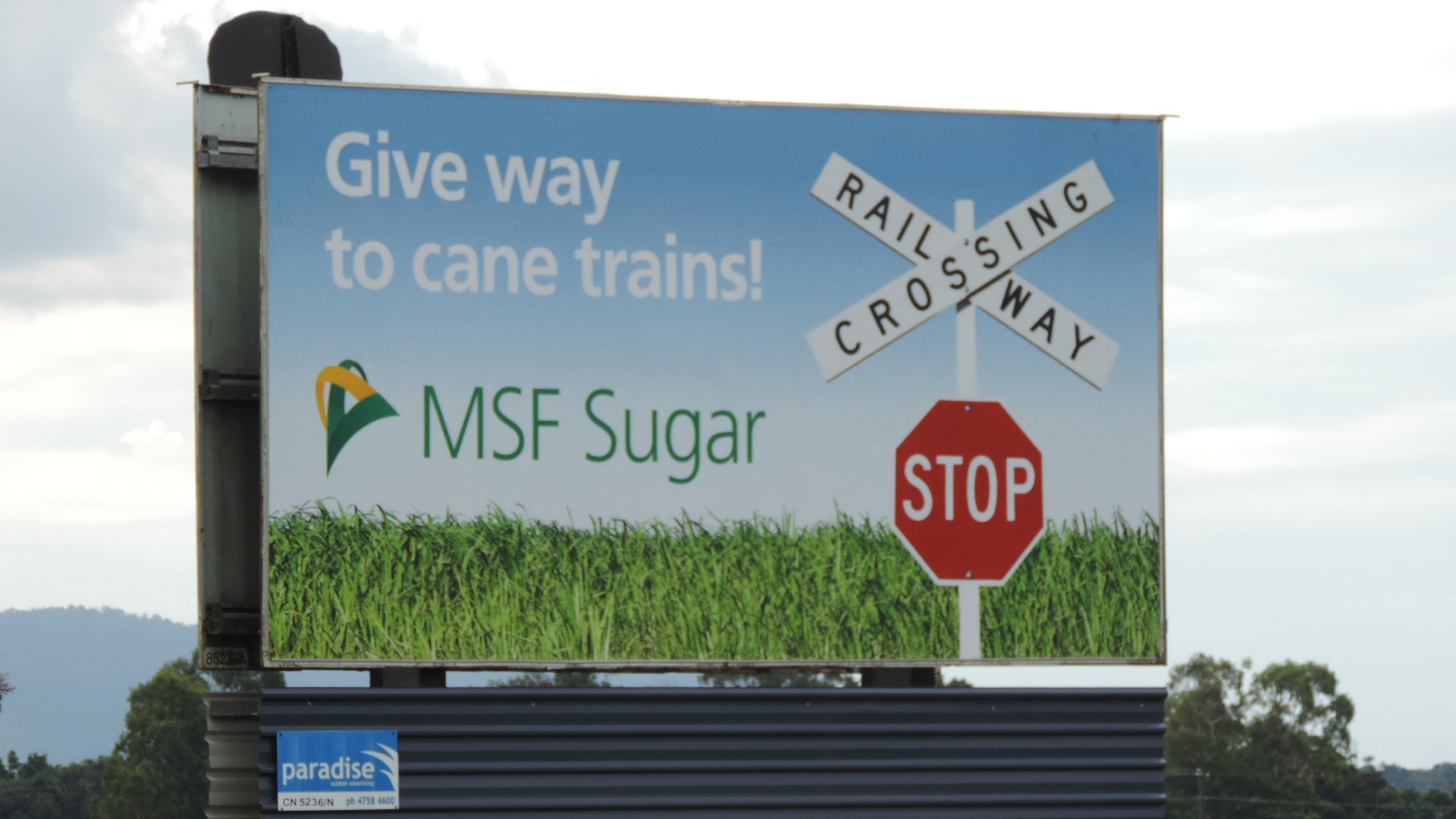
Sign warning about cane trains, 2016

The sugar industry is an important industry in Australia. In 2024, it was valued at $2.5 billion per annum. Requiring a hot climate and plenty of water, sugarcane is predominantly grown in Queensland with some in northern New South Wales. Sugar is the second largest agricultural export from Queensland. Over 4000 sugar cane farms produce 32–35 million tonnes of sugar cane each year, from which 4–4.5 million tonnes of raw sugar is extracted at sugarcane mills. In 2011, there were 24 sugar mills in Australia, ranging from Mossman in Queensland to Grafton in New South Wales. Mackay Region is known for its five locally owned mills. Altogether they produce enough sugar to support Central Queensland and Northern Queensland. They range from Racecourse Sugar Mill, Farleigh Mill, Marian Mill, Proserpine Mill and Sarina Sugar Shed. Queensland's first industrial-scale sugar plantation commenced in Moreton Bay in 1864.

== List of operating sugar mills in Queensland ==
This is a list of the sugar cane mills in Queensland, ordered from north to south.

Sugar mills in Queensland
Photo	Name	Location	Local government area	Crush capacity [million tonnes cane per year]	Notes	Coordinates
	Mulgrave Sugar Mill	Gordonvale	Cairns Region	1.2	Mulgrave Sugar Mill commenced operations in 1896. It is operated by MSF Sugar, a subsidiary of the Mitr Phol Group.	17.0929°S 145.7889°E
	Tableland Sugar Mill	Arriga	Shire of Mareeba	0.6	The mill is the newest in Australia having been opened in 1998 by Bundaberg Sugar. It is currently operated by MSF Sugar, a subsidiary of the Mitr Phol Group.	17.1197°S 145.3453°E
	South Johnstone Sugar Mill	South Johnstone	Cassowary Coast Region	1.8	Operated by MSF Sugar, a subsidiary of the Mitr Phol Group.	17.6057°S 145.9909°E
	Tully Sugar Mill	Tully	Cassowary Coast Region	2.5	Operated by Tully Sugar, a subsidiary of China Foods Limited.	17.9370°S 145.9267°E
	Macknade Sugar Mill	Macknade	Shire of Hinchinbrook	1.82	Operated by Wilmar Sugar Australia. The Macknade mill crushes an average of 1.5 million tonnes of sugarcane a year, to manufacture about 191,000 tonnes of raw sugar.	18.5883°S 146.2589°E
	Victoria Sugar Mill	Victoria Plantation	Shire of Hinchinbrook	3.74	Operated by Wilmar Sugar Australia. The factory crushes an average of three million tonnes of sugarcane a year to manufacture about 400,000 tonnes of raw sugar, making it the largest mill in Australia. It is located about 3km east of Ingham.	18.6504°S 146.2023°E
	Invicta Sugar Mill	Giru	Shire of Burdekin	3.67	Operated by Wilmar Sugar Australia. The Invicta Sugar Mill produced 440,000 tonnes of raw sugar from about 3 Mt sugar cane in 2022. It was located near the Kolan River in Bucca in the Bundaberg Region but was relocated to Giru in 1919 with the same name.	19.5169°S 147.1058°E
	Kalamia Sugar Mill	Brandon	Shire of Burdekin	1.5	Operated by Wilmar Sugar Australia. The Kalamia Sugar Mill produced 230,000 tonnes of raw sugar from about 1.5 Mt sugar cane in 2022.	19.5244°S 147.4163°E
	Pioneer Sugar Mill	Brandon	Shire of Burdekin	2.16	Operated by Wilmar Sugar Australia. The Pioneer Sugar Mill produced 260,000 tonnes of raw sugar from about 1.7 Mt sugar cane in 2022.	19.5581°S 147.3310°E
	Inkerman Sugar Mill	Home Hill	Shire of Burdekin	2.07	Operated by Wilmar Sugar Australia. Maximum output 2.07 million tonnes in 2011. In 2022, the Inkerman Sugar Mill produced 260,000 tonnes of raw sugar from about 1.7 Mt sugar cane.	19.6438°S 147.4007°E
	Proserpine Sugar Mill	Proserpine	Whitsunday Region	2.13	Operated by Wilmar Sugar Australia. The mill crushes an average of 1.7 million tonnes of sugarcane a year, to manufacture about 240,000 tonnes of sugar.	20.3986°S 148.5802°E
	Farleigh Sugar Mill	Farleigh	Mackay Region	1.7	Owned by Mackay Sugar Limited (MSL).	21.0996°S 149.1004°E
	Marian Sugar Mill	Marian	Mackay Region	2.60	Owned by Mackay Sugar Limited (MSL).	21.1449°S 148.9385°E
	Racecourse Sugar Mill	Racecourse	Mackay Region	1.70	Owned by Mackay Sugar Limited (MSL). Sugar refining for MSL is mainly done at the Racecourse location, where MSL operates a refinery together with a partner. It produces about 400,000 tonnes of refined white sugar annually sold under the CSR label.	21.1640°S 149.1348°E
	Plane Creek Sugar Mill	Sarina	Mackay Region	1.76	Operated by Wilmar Sugar Australia. It crushes an average of 1.2 million tonnes of sugarcane a year, to manufacture about 180,000 tonnes of raw sugar.	21.4278°S 149.2159°E
	Millaquin Sugar Mill	Bundaberg East	Bundaberg Region	1.3	Operated by Bundaberg Sugar. Millaquin Mill has an annual crushing capacity of 1.3 million tonnes of cane and produces more than 205,000 tonnes of raw sugar per crushing season.	24.8591°S 152.3528°E
	Isis Central Sugar Mill	Isis Central	Bundaberg Region	1.5	The mill commenced operation in 1879 and remains a locally owned company. The Mill processes 1,505,400 tonnes of cane for the production of 223,874 tonnes of raw sugar.	25.1954°S 152.2088°E
	Rocky Point Sugar Mill	Steiglitz & Woongoolba	City of Gold Coast	0.435	Established in 1879, Rocky Point Mill is the only privately owned mill in Australia, operated by the Heck family over 5 generations.	27.7352°S 153.3267°E

The sugar mills in northern New South Wales are located in Broadwater, Condong, and Harwood Island.

== Former sugar mills in Queensland ==
Poor roads and limited transport options meant that there were once many local sugar mills in Queensland. With improved transport options, many of these smaller mills closed and only the larger more economic mills remain. This list is likely to be incomplete as many mills were small and operated only for a short period leaving few records. They are ordered from north to south, although in some cases the location is not known very accurately.

Former sugar mills in Queensland
	Name	Location	Local government area	Crush capacity [million tonnes cane per year]	Notes	Coordinates (may be approximate)
	Mossman Central Mill	Mossman	Shire of Douglas	0.85	Operated by Far Northern Milling. The Mossman central mill crushed about 640,000 tonnes of cane in 2022.	16.4586°S 145.3782°E
	Maryborough Sugar Mill	Maryborough	Fraser Coast Region	0.8	Operated by MSF Sugar, a subsidiary of the Mitr Phol Group. The mill crushes 0.7–0.8 million tonnes per year.	25.5479°S 152.7172°E
	Pleystowe Sugar Mill	Pleystowe	Mackay Region		No longer operational as a mill but used by Mackay Sugar for shared services in support of its other mills.	21.1430°S 149.0392°E
	Bingera Sugar Mill	South Kolan	Bundaberg Region		Operated by Bundaberg Sugar	24.9290°S 152.1998°E
	Bloomfield River Sugar Mill	near Ayton	Shire of Cook		crushed 1884–1889	15.881°S 145.339°E (approx)
	Hop Wah Pioneer Sugar Mill	Mulgrave Road, Woree	Cairns Region		First sugar mill in North Queensland, opened in August 1881, and initially owned and operated by the Hop Wah Company of Chinese investors and managed by Andrew Leon	
	Hambledon Sugar Mill	Mill Road, Edmonton	Cairns Region		1883–1991	17.021°S 145.734°E (approx)
	Babinda Central Sugar Mill	Babinda	Cairns Region		1915–2011	17.340°S 145.925°E
	Goondi Sugar Mill	Goondi	Cassowary Coast Region		Opened in 1883, probably located at the end of Goondi Mill Road near the Johnstone River. Closed in 1987 after being taken over by Bundaberg Sugar.	17.5089°S 146.0020°E (approx)
	Mourilyan Sugar Mill	Mill Street, Mourilyan	Cassowary Coast Region		Opened in 1883, it operated until it was damaged in Cyclone Larry in March 2006 (see photo). After the cyclone it operated intermittently and closed permanently later in 2006.	17.5799°S 146.0336°E
	Gairloch Sugar Mill	Ingham	Shire of Hinchinbrook			
	Hamleigh Sugar Mill	Ingham	Shire of Hinchinbrook			
	Ripple Creek Sugar Mill	Macknade	Shire of Hinchinbrook			
	Macknade Sugar Mill	Ingham	Shire of Hinchinbrook			
	Habana Sugar Mill	Habana	Mackay Region		The Habana mill operated from 1883 to 1901.	21.0417°S 149.1111°E (approx)
	Richmond Sugar Mill	Richmond	Mackay Region		1881–1895	21.0816°S 149.1458°E
	North Eton Sugar Mill	Mill Street, North Eton	Mackay Region		Originally known as the Defiance, the North Eton Central Mill commenced crushing sugarcane in 1888. It was the first sugar mill sponsored by the Queensland Government. In 1989, a number of sugar mills in the district merged to Mackay Sugar Limited, resulting in the closure of the North Eton mill.	21.2312°S 148.9645°E(approx)
	Homebush Sugar Mill	Homebush	Mackay Region		1883–1922	21.2713°S 149.0475°E (Homebush)
	Te Kowai Sugar Mill	Mackay	Mackay Region			
	Palms Sugar Mill	Palms	Mackay Region		Palms was the last of the plantation mills in the Mackay district, closing in 1924.	
	Cassada Sugar Mill	Walkerston	Mackay Region		Operated from 1870 to 1886.	21.1727°S 149.0712°E
Palmyra sugar mill, 1895	Palmyra Sugar Mill	Palmyra	Mackay Region		Operated from 1883 to 1905.	21.1769°S 149.0903°E
	Alexandra Sugar Mill	Alexandra	Mackay Region		Operated from 1868 to 1884. When originally constructed, it was the largest sugar mill in Queensland. It was named after Princess Alexandra of Denmark who married Prince Edward (later King Edward VII) of Great Britain on 10 March 1863.	
	River Estate Sugar Mills	River Estate (possibly Foulden)	Mackay Region		There were three mills at River Estate: Old Sugar Mill (1873–1887), North Sugar Mill (1881–1886) and New Sugar Mill (1887–1891).	
	Foulden Sugar Mill	Foulden	Mackay Region		Operated from 1872 to 1887. It was on the northern bank of the Pioneer River.	
	Balmoral Sugar Mill	West Mackay	Mackay Region		Operated from 1873 to 1880.	21.1617°S 149.1605°E
	Meadowlands Sugar Mill	Racecourse	Mackay Region		Operated from 1870 to 1914.	21.1596°S 149.1436°E
	Cattle Creek Cooperative Sugar Mill	Finch Hatton	Mackay Region		Commenced in 1906, closed in 1990.	
	The Cedars Mill	North Mackay	Mackay Region		Commenced in 1873, closed in 1886. Operated by Maurice Hume Black.	
	Yeppoon Sugar Mill, (Farnborough Sugam Mill)	Farnborough	Shire of Livingstone		Commenced in 1883, closed in 1903.	
	Fairymead Sugar Mill	Fairymead	Bundaberg Region		Opened 1884, closed in 2005	
	Oakwood Sugar Mill	Bundaberg	Bundaberg Region			
	Doolbi Sugar Mill	Doolbi	Bundaberg Region			
	Pemberton Sugar Mill		Bundaberg Region			
	Invicta Sugar Mill		Bundaberg Region		Originally located near the Kolan River in Bucca in the Bundaberg Region but relocated to Giru in 1919 where it is still now as the Invicta Sugar Mill.	
	Qunaba Sugar Mill		Bundaberg Region			
	North Isis Sugar Mill		Bundaberg Region			
	Sharon Sugar Mill		Bundaberg Region			
	Windermere Sugar Mill	Windermere	Bundaberg Region			
	Goodwood Sugar Mill	Goodwood	Bundaberg Region			
	Central Sugar Mill	Yengarie	Fraser Coast Region		The ruins of this mill are listed on the Queensland Heritage Register.	25.534°S 152.635°E
	Yengarie Sugar Refinery	Yengarie	Fraser Coast Region		The ruins of this mill are listed on the Queensland Heritage Register.	25.5611°S 152.6162°E
	Mount Bauple sugar mill	Bauple	Fraser Coast Region		The Mount Bauple sugar mill was established in 1896; it was the largest in the district. There were cane tramways to deliver the harvested sugarcane to the mill at 26 Mill Street. The mill closed in 1951, as the sugarcane was then being sent to mills in Nambour and Maryborough. The plans for the sugar mill are held at State Library of Queensland.	25.81739°S 152.62118°E
	Moreton Central Mill	Nambour	Sunshine Coast Region		Closed in 2003	
	Oaklands Sugar Mill (also known as Whish's Sugar Mill)	Morayfield	City of Moreton Bay		The mill operated between 1865 and 1872.	27.0963°S 152.9744°E
		St Helena Island	City of Brisbane			
	Gibsons Clydesdale Sugar Mill	Hemmant	City of Brisbane		Operated from the 1860s	
	Cooperative Sugar Mill	Murarrie	City of Brisbane		Commenced in 1872.	
