= Colonial Sugar Refining Company =

The Colonial Sugar Refining Company is an Australian company founded in 1855. It may refer to:

- CSR Limited - the actual name of the company, which retired from the sugar business after it sold it subsidiary Sucrogen to Wilmar International in 2010
- Colonial Sugar Refining Company (Fiji) - the sugar operations CSR possessed in Fiji (1880-1973)
- Chelsea Sugar Refinery - the New Zealand company formed by Colonial Sugar to refine raw sugar
