= Tramway Lift Bridge over Maroochy River =

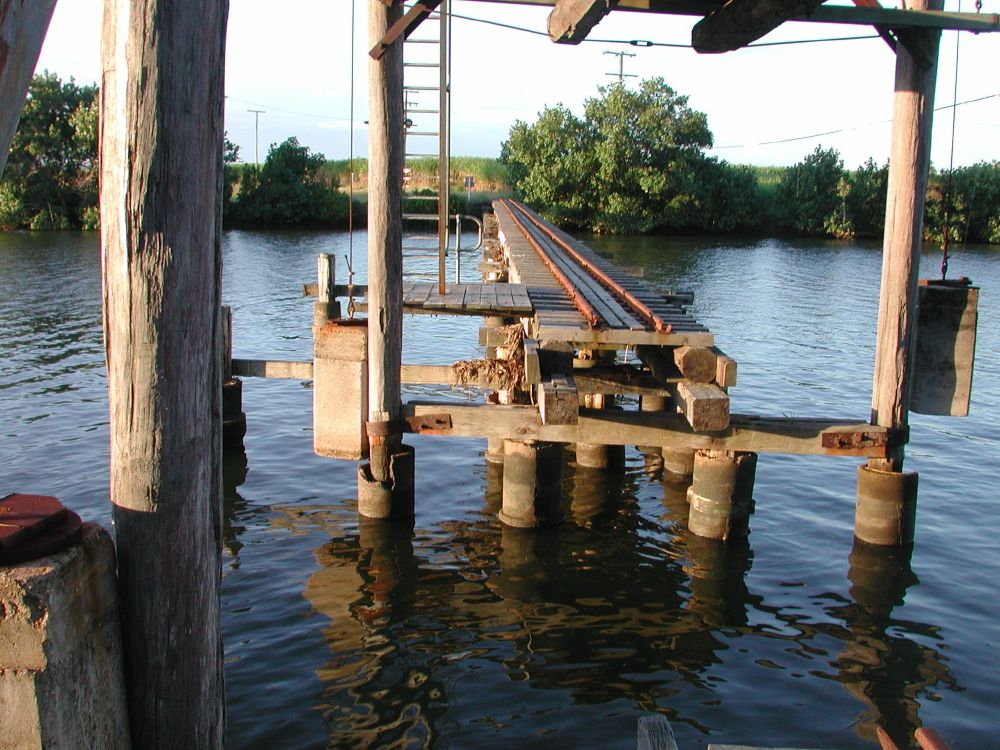
- Tramway Lift Bridge over Maroochy River

- Location within Queensland Location within Australia
- 26.5824°S 153.0268°E
- Location: Store Road, Nambour, Sunshine Coast Region, Queensland, Australia

History
- Design period: 1919–1930s (interwar period)
- Built: 1921
- Demolished: 2022

Queensland Heritage Register
- Official name: Tramway Lift Bridge over Maroochy River
- Type: state heritage (built)
- Designated: 7 February 2005
- Reference no.: 602527
- Significant period: 1920s (fabric); 1921–2003 (historical use)
- Significant components: tower, pier/s (bridge), machinery/plant/equipment – transport – rail

The Tramway Lift Bridge over Maroochy River was a heritage-listed railway bridge at Store Road, Nambour, Sunshine Coast Region, Queensland, Australia. It was built in 1921. It was added to the Queensland Heritage Register on 7 February 2005. It was destroyed by floods in 2022 and then removed from the heritage register.

== History ==
The Moreton Central Sugar Mill opened for crushing in 1897. The lift bridge was part of the Moreton Central Sugar Mill Cane Tramway that connected the mill with cane farms, which developed over many years and was in use until late 2003. It was a key factor in the success of the mill and the development of Nambour.

Extending the tramway network proved expensive due to the nature of the terrain and there were consequent difficulties with the supply of cane to the mill, though by 1905, when the first locomotive, a Krauss 0-6-0 tank locomotive, was purchased, there were 26 miles (42 km) of permanent tramline in use. In 1911 a branch line was constructed to the Maroochy River and although the eastern section of the tramway network continued to be extended, lines on the western side were sold to Maroochy Shire in 1914.

Two short sections of line on the north side were laid, but a shortage of steel and labour during and after WWI delayed further work. Much of the line was temporary, being laid down for the crushing season. In 1917 a lift up bridge was constructed over Petrie Creek. In 1920, the mill board sought permission from the state government to bridge the Maroochy River and this was granted on 10 May 1920. The new bridge was also a lift bridge and was completed by August 1921.

The lift mechanism was necessary as the bridge carried tramline, which had to be level with the land on either side of the river. This made the bridge too low to allow boats to use the waterway. This problem had been addressed since the early nineteenth century by providing bridges with a moveable section. Moveable bridges fall into three types; the bascule bridge, in which two sections hinge upwards, the swing bridge in which a span rotates away from the river, and the lift bridge. In this type, the moveable span is located between two towers and can be raised vertically by means of a system of cable, pulleys and counterweights. The span remains horizontal when lifted, so that river traffic can pass beneath. In larger bridges, engines control the span's movement, though the Maroochy bridge is hand operated. Lift bridges generally are now an uncommon type and this is believed to be the only remaining example of a tramway bridge with a lift span in Queensland.

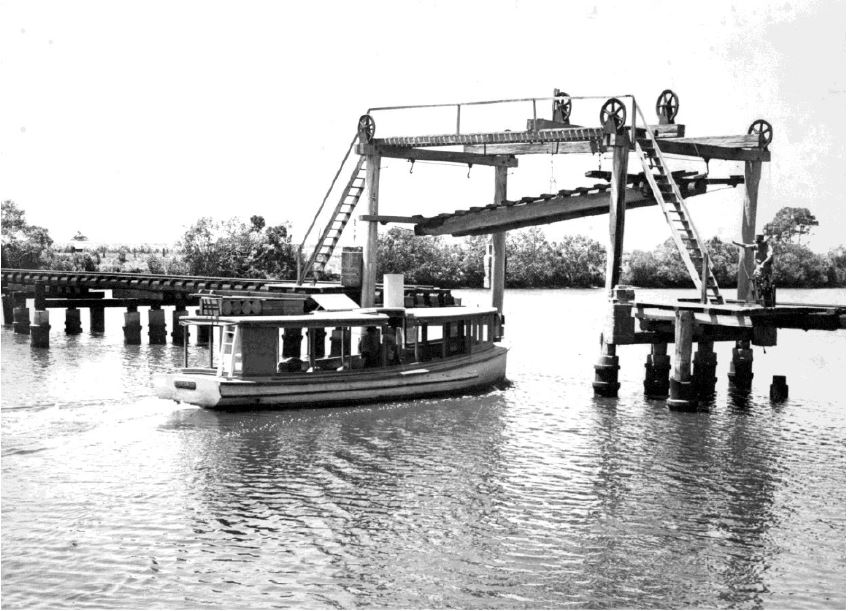
Boat travelling under the lifted section of the tramway bridge, 1930s

The moveable span on the Maroochy bridge lifts to a height of 26 feet (7.9 m) providing a space 17 feet 6 inches (5.33 m) above the high water mark for boats to pass through. This bridge linked the northern cane growing areas to the tramway system. It was extended to connect with an isolated line built in 1922 between Coolum Creek and Coolum Beach. This line officially opened in 1923, though it had been in use for some time before this and was also used for the transport of passengers.

Work on the mill and the tramway system continued through the 1930s, though during World War II operations at the mill fell because shipping was disrupted and there were labour shortages. In 1951–2 an extensive program of repairs and line relaying was carried out. In 1956 land at the River Bridge depot was purchased from the Maroochy Co-Operative Society Limited and the store buildings on it sold for removal. A metal shed and annexe were later constructed near the bridge at an unknown date. In 1961 diesel locomotives were purchased which necessitated strengthening bridges and laying heavier rail along the tramways.

The lift-up bridge over Petrie Creek no longer exists and the Maroochy River bridge was a very rare example of its type in Queensland.

In 2019, a small section of the bridge was removed and placed in the Nambour Museum.

The bridge was destroyed during the Sunshine Coast regional floods of 2022. The floodwaters washed away the historic structure, and it has since been completely removed from the site. The loss of this heritage-listed bridge eliminated what was believed to be the only remaining example of a tramway bridge with a lift span in Queensland.

== Former description ==
The tramway lift bridge was a low-level timber bridge that spanned the Maroochy River between the former depot near River Store Road on the south bank and Store Road on the north bank. It ran between the banks of the river within formal abutments, though the bank beneath was reinforced with stones.

The bridge was supported on timber piers sheathed in concrete. A span near the southern bank was moveable and was situated between two timber lift towers. The lift span could be raised by hand using a chain harness and a system of cables and pulleys located on the timber lift towers and balanced by concrete counter weights. It carried metal tramway lines of 2 feet (0.61 m) gauge laid over timber sleepers. Two metal ladders with metal handrails provided access to the top of the lift towers where there was a tubular metal guardrail.

== Heritage listing ==
The Tramway Lift Bridge over Maroochy River was listed on the Queensland Heritage Register on 7 February 2005 having satisfied the following criteria.

The place is important in demonstrating the evolution or pattern of Queensland's history.

The Moreton Central Sugar Mill operated between 1897 and December 2003. During the 20th century, sugar growing was the most important primary industry in the Maroochy district. It was a key factor in the development of Nambour and the Maroochy Shire and important in the growth of the sugar industry in Queensland. The cane tramway, which brought cane from many farms to the mill for crushing, was an essential part of the operation of the mill. The line between Nambour and Coolum was also used for passengers in the 1920s and 30s and was instrumental in the development of the tourist industry in the area, by linking the QR station next to the Nambour mill with resort areas at Coolum and Maroochydore.

The place demonstrates rare, uncommon or endangered aspects of Queensland's cultural heritage.

The timber lift bridge that carried the tramway across the Maroochy River was rare and was the only surviving bridge of its type in Queensland until its destruction in 2022.

The place is important in demonstrating the principal characteristics of a particular class of cultural places.

The bridge, though small in scale, demonstrated the principle and working of a lift bridge well, having had a moveable span set between two towers and pulleys and counterweights which raised the span to allow river traffic to pass underneath.

== See also ==
- List of tramways in Queensland
