= Moreton Central Sugar Mill Worker's Housing =

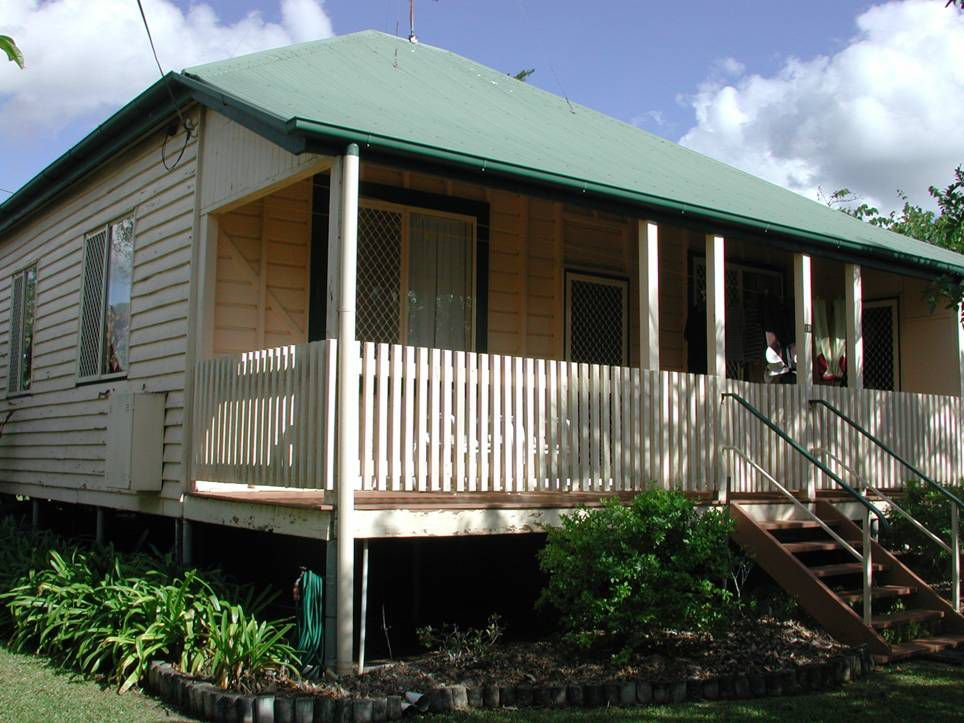
- Moreton Central Sugar Mill Worker's Housing at 19 Mill Street, 2015

- Location within Queensland Location within Australia
- 26.6272°S 152.9582°E
- Location: 17 & 19 Mill Street, and 14 & 16 Bury Street, Nambour, Sunshine Coast Region, Queensland, Australia

Queensland Heritage Register
- Official name: Moreton Central Sugar Mill Worker's Housing (former)
- Type: state heritage (built)
- Designated: 16 May 2008
- Reference no.: 602648
- Significant period: 1890s

Moreton Central Sugar Mill Worker's Housing is a heritage-listed group of houses at 17 & 19 Mill Street, and 14 & 16 Bury Street, Nambour, Sunshine Coast Region, Queensland, Australia. It was added to the Queensland Heritage Register on 16 May 2008.

== History ==
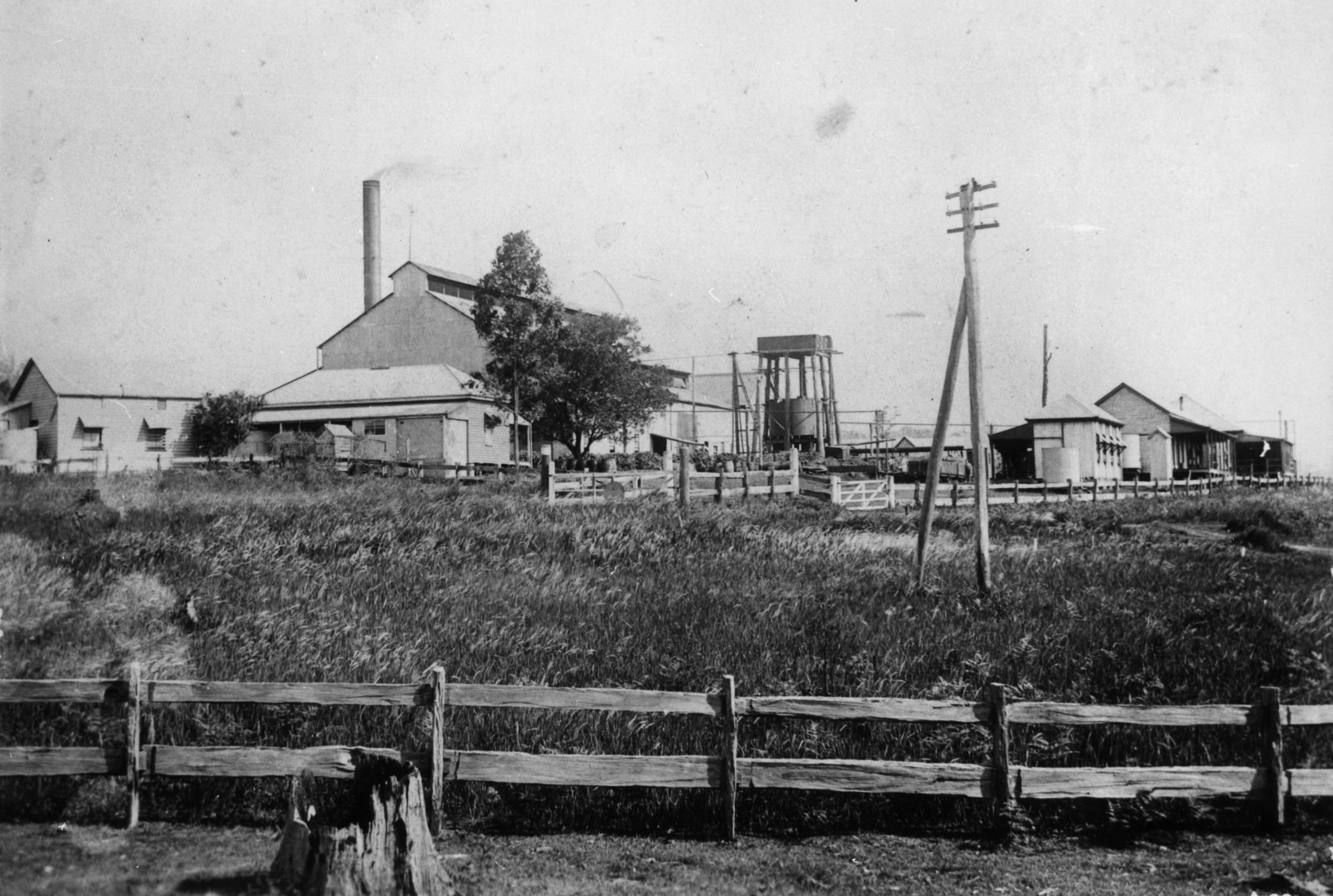
View of the Moreton Central Sugar Mill, ca. 1910

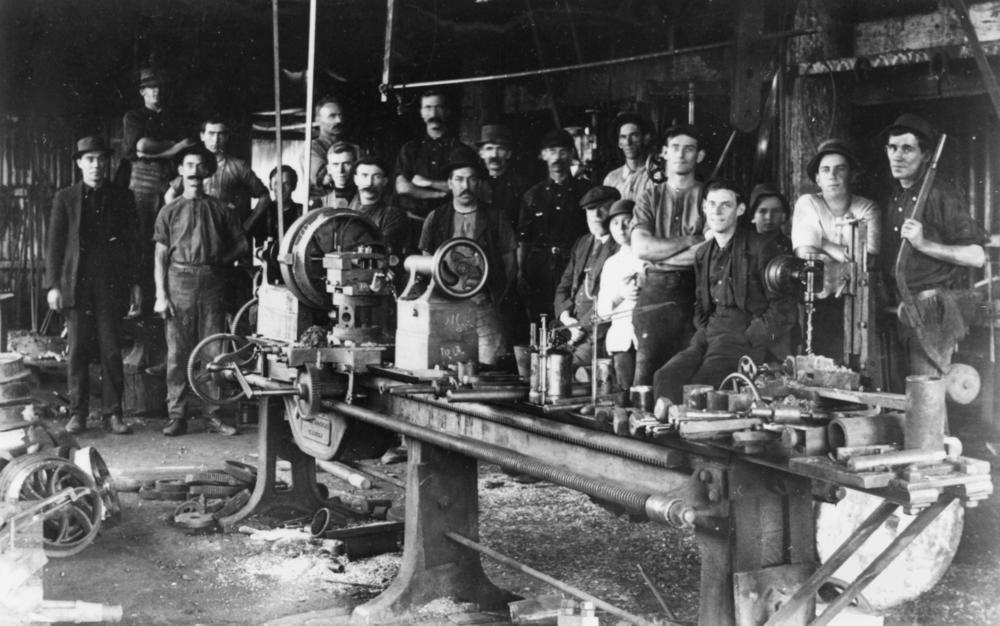
Workers at the Moreton Central Sugar Mill, Nambour, ca. 1900

The two timber cottages at 17 and 19 Mill Street, built sometime between 1897 and 1917, and the timber house with its extensive garden and mature trees on Bury Street, built between 1907 and 1911, provide rare surviving evidence of the sugar industry that powered the economy of Nambour and the Maroochy Shire from 1897 to 2003. The cottages on Mill Street are the former residences of senior staff of the Moreton Central Sugar Mill Company, and the house on Bury Street was formerly the residence of the mill's manager.

Although timber was a vital part of the early economy of the Sunshine Coast region, sugar eventually became the primary agricultural activity of the Maroochy Shire. However, efforts to grow sugar cane in the area were isolated and sporadic between 1865 and 1880. In 1880 sugar prices rose and this, along with speculation about a future North Coast railway line between Brisbane and Gympie, encouraged further selection and small scale sugar growing in Maroochy.

The best hope for cane growers in the Maroochy Shire was the establishment of a central sugar mill. Although the first half of the 1880s was a golden era for those Queensland sugar producers who operated by the plantation system, under which large areas of sugar cane were worked by South Sea Islander labourers, Queensland Premier Samuel Griffith sought to promote closer settlement via small-scale cane farming by white settlers. Small sugar mills on individual plantations would be superseded by a series of large central mills, each processing the sugar cane of a group of small farmers.

Queensland's first central mill opened at North Eton near Mackay in 1888, and in 1893 the Sugar Works Guarantee Act provided for government loans to local companies to build central mills, secured by mortgages over the lands of their shareholders (the cane farmers). Fifteen year loans would be made to incorporated companies where there was enough suitable land, already farmed by small canegrowers, to supply a mill. The company's freehold land (the mill site) would also be mortgaged to the government, and all building contracts would have to be approved by the Department of Public Works.

The Maroochy region was well suited for a central mill site as it was a region of small farms. By the mid 1880s there were 116 people employed in mixed farming, 70 in sugar, 52 in timber, and only 15 in grazing. The Maroochy Shire developed into Queensland's largest fruit growing area between the 1880s and 1915, with bananas being grown from the 1880s, and pineapples from the 1890s. Dairy farming would also play an important part in the local economy from the 1890s. However, after the early 1890s Depression, and the 1893 floods, many farmers were considering quitting the area, and sugar offered an alternative source of income to mixed food crops.

In early 1894 some farmers met at Rosemount School on Petrie Creek, to discuss a central sugar mill. A committee was formed and applied to have land in the area assessed by the government for its viability, and similar applications were made by farmers at Dulong and Yandina. In mid-1894 R.W. McCulloch, from the Department of Agriculture, assessed the potential sugar-growing land in the district, and concluded that there was sufficient acreage to support a mill. McCulloch also believed that Nambour would be the best site for a central mill, with its site on the railway, and cane-growing land to its east and west.

The town of Nambour had begun with the building of a hotel by Mathew Carroll in the 1880s, and had developed in anticipation of the arrival of the North Coast Railway. After the Brisbane to Yandina section of the railway opened in January 1891, the town of Petrie's Creek (formed by the subdivision of freehold land, rather than by Lands Department survey) was renamed Nambour. Sugar became the sole crop of most farms in the Nambour district, and the mill ensured that Nambour became the commercial centre of the Shire.

The Moreton Central Sugar Mill Company was registered on 21 December 1894, the first meeting of the mill's board of directors took place in January 1895, and tenders for the mill were called in February. In December 1895 eight acres 1 rood 24.9 perches (1,640 m^{2}) of Lawrence Cusack's estate, being liquidated by the South Australian Land Mortgage and Agency Company, was transferred to the company at the site of the future mill and its housing. By this time the population of Nambour was about 150 people. During 1896 the mill was constructed, and a low dam wall was built at a waterhole on Petrie Creek, with a pump mounted on the bank to supply water to the mill. The first season's crush took place in 1897, when 752 long tons (764 t) of sugar was produced from 7,553 long tons (7,674 t) of sugar cane. Pipes from the dam to the mill had been laid under the railway tracks that year, with the water being pumped into elevated tanks at the mill. To increase the volume of water, a series of sandbag weirs were also built across the creek.

The mill's finances were not in good shape in its early years, due to problems with maintaining a steady supply of sugar cane to the mill. Firstly, these problems were linked to the tramway system, and a tendency to prioritise the building of tramline routes on the basis of the self-interest of the mill directors, rather than the most cost- effective ratio of tramline mileage to acreage of sugar cane accessed. Speed of delivery was another issue. Until the purchase of a Krauss engine in 1904, the cane trucks were towed by horses, due to the government's reluctance to authorise the purchase of locomotives. The Federation drought which culminated in 1902 also reduced the supply of cane available for crushing.

In 1899 the government took over the mill's management and its financial liabilities, at the suggestion of the mill's directors, but by 1904 the mill was still a "non-earning enterprise", unable to repay its government loan. Rather than foreclose on the mill, the State Treasurer took over the company's affairs and worked on increasing the supply of cane to the mill. In 1906, to forestall foreclosure, money was borrowed from the London Bank of Australia to pay off the government, with the growers' land once more used as security. In January 1907, the Moreton Central Sugar Mill Company was handed back as a private enterprise.

The London Bank was paid off by 1914, due to the sale of the mill's western tramline to the Maroochy Shire Council after cold weather had convinced cane farmers to the west of Nambour to convert to dairy farming. Experiments in 1909 by the Moreton mill had shown that cane tramlines could be used for public transport, and the Shire Council extended the two foot gauge tramline to Mapleton in 1914.

From this time forward the mill's fortunes improved. In 1915 the Sugar Cane Prices Act, and the Commonwealth War Precautions Act effectively nationalised the sugar industry, and the 1923 Commonwealth-State sugar agreement guaranteed a market for sugar. There were bumper sugar crops in Maroochy in 1924 and 1925, and the mill was expanded and electrified in the mid 1920s. Around 1934 to 1935 a weir was built on Petrie Creek, and in 1935 a new 20,000-imperial-gallon (91,000 L; 24,000 US gal) tank was built in the mill yard. The sewer that was constructed for the Nambour CBD in 1912 was flushed out daily with 500 imperial gallons (2,300 L; 600 US gal) of water from the mill's tanks, through a filter bed of sand and ashes, and water was supplied to both hotels in Nambour by 1937. From 1962 the water supply of the town was supplemented from Wappa Dam. In 1969 the level of weir was raised 300 mm (12 in), and in the 1980s the weir wall was again raised.

Soil erosion had pushed sugar off the Blackall Range by the early 1950s, but sugar boomed in this period. By the 1970s sugar was Maroochy's biggest industry, and the mill was purchased by Howard Smith in 1976. Depression hit the sugar industry in 1984, thanks to competition from European beet sugar, and by 1985 tourism had overtaken sugar as Maroochy's largest industry. In addition, between 1980 and 2003 more than 1,000 hectares (2,500 acres) of sugar land in the Maroochy Shire was lost to urban development and other uses. The mill was sold to Bundaberg Sugar in 1987, which was taken over by the British company Tate and Lyle in 1991. The Belgian company Finasucre acquired the mill in 2000, and it was closed in December 2003, after over 100 years of operation. Although the mill was demolished in 2004, tram tracks along Mill Street and Howard Street, the staff houses next to the mill site, and the weir on Petrie Creek still exist as reminders of the industry that was once the economic lifeblood of Nambour and the Maroochy Shire.

From the outset of the Central Mill system, it was usual for the company to provide accommodation for senior staff and for some mill workers, since many mills were in isolated areas or in new towns that were short of accommodation. At a meeting of the mill directors on 14 May 1897 it was proposed that tenders be called for two buildings to accommodate senior mill staff - the manager (1896 to 1900), John A Malcolm, and the secretary (1896 to 1904), John R Isgar. The houses were to comprise four rooms, with a hipped roof, the two front rooms of each to be ceiled, with studds (sic) outside. Their size would be 7.8 m × 6.6 m (26 ft × 22 ft), with 1.8 m (5.9 ft) front verandahs. They were to have an iron chimney, and an iron roof, and would be built with hoop pine boards. A tender was also called for bachelors' quarters, sized 12 m × 4.8 m (39 ft × 16 ft). At the meeting of directors on 11 June 1897 the tender of Thomas Cusack for the cottages was accepted, at £125/18/0 each, with six weeks to complete the contract.

It has been claimed that the two dwellings at 17 and 19 Mill Street are the cottages constructed for the manager and secretary in 1897, but there is insufficient evidence to substantiate this claim. Cusack was contracted to build two identical structures, and although the two Mill Street cottages were originally similar in size and plan, with four room cores and L-shaped verandahs, they may have been built as late as 1917. By 1926 a line of staff residences faced Mill Street.

Documentary evidence indicates that the chief engineer from 1911 to 1913, Sam Baildon, was refused a company house in 1912, which means that there was no dedicated chief engineer's cottage before that time. However, in 1914 Samuel Glass, cane inspector, was living in a cottage of four rooms and a kitchen in Mill Street, and in 1917 Albert Shearer, a locomotive driver, requested a company house, and a cottage was erected for him "to the same plans as the chief engineer's cottage". In addition two residences were moved to Mill Street, from close to the mill, during the 1925 and 1926 mill expansion. In 1926 the cottages in Mill Street used by the chief engineer, secretary, and second engineer were extended and painted. In 2003 one of the authors of the book Moreton Sugar Mill: Sweet Heart of Nambour stated that 17 Mill Street was the chief engineer's cottage (pre-1915), that 19 Mill Street was the cane inspector's cottage (1914), and that a house at 21 Mill Street (demolished some time after 1966) had been the chemist's cottage (1917).

Regardless of the actual build dates of the surviving two cottages, and which staff member lived in them at any particular time, it is clear that they are surviving examples of the houses erected for senior staff by the Moreton Central Sugar Mill Company between 1897 and the late 1930s. The Mill Street cottages stand on part of the Moreton Central Sugar Mill's original 1895 land purchase, and although they have been extended and modified since their construction they have been an integral part of the mill site and the mill's operations.

The cottage at 19 Mill Street was constructed as a modest timber cottage of a lesser scale than the manager's residence in Bury Street. Changes have been made, but the original form and planning are evident. It was originally of single skin construction, with 200-millimetre (7.9 in) horizontal cladding and hardwood external studs. It had three bedrooms, a dining room, hallway, and verandahs to the front, west and part of the rear. Additions and changes have included weatherboard cladding to most of the exterior, enclosure of the western and rear verandah, and removal of internal walls to the dining room and the wall between the dining room and the back verandah. Internal walls and ceilings have been lined, and some doors have been removed. A kitchen wing was added, possibly in the 1920s. There has been a bathroom addition to the southern end of the western verandah, and aluminium framed windows have been added throughout.

The cottage at 17 Mill Street was constructed as a modest timber cottage, with a timber frame and using 100-millimetre (3.9 in) vertical tongue-and-groove boarding and hardwood weatherboards. Changes have been made but the original form and planning are evident. Changes include enclosure of the eastern verandah, and extensions to the rear for a kitchen and bathroom post-1925.

The residence on Bury Street was the second manager's residence built by the company. Evidence suggests that it was built between 1907 and 1911. After John Malcolm, mill managers had included Drummond McPherson (1900 to 1902), John Lunn (1902 to 1904) and RW McCulloch (several months in 1904). Wilfred Desplace was manager from May 1904 to 1907, when he was replaced by William Lyle, for whom a cottage with "two rooms and a verandah" was erected. This may refer to the house on Bury Street, although it originally comprised a core of four to five rooms. James Edwards was appointed mill secretary in 1907, and he moved into the cottage that had been built for the manager before the government takeover.

In 1908 Walter Lanham constructed £44 worth of alterations and additions to the manager's cottage, and this may refer to the kitchen wing to the rear of the Bury Street house. In 1912 George Greathead moved into the manager's residence, which had been occupied by Edwards during 1911. Greathead was employed by the company as a chemist from 1909, and after acting as combined chemist and manager in 1911 he became the general manager of the mill in 1912, holding this position until 1932. When Greathead moved into the Bury Street house Edwards moved back into the 1897 manager's cottage, which had become known as the secretary's cottage. Edwards soon resigned and was replaced by George F. Scott, who was the mill's secretary between 1912 and 1940.

A photograph taken from the street in 1914 shows the original house and its southern and eastern verandahs, and view from the mill's chimney in 1925 shows the kitchen extension on the northwest corner of the house. A tennis court also existed in the garden between the house and the mill, as George Greathead was fond of tennis. During World War II the tennis court was excavated to build an air raid shelter. After Arthur Thorp became the manager in 1937, he commissioned repairs and alterations that transformed the manager's house in a "very nice home". This work included relining and remodelling the main rooms; realigning some internal walls, including infilling of one set of French doors to the verandah; replacement of the French doors; and removing part of the rear verandah and replacing it with a sunroom on the northeast corner. The front steps were relocated to the southwest corner, and given a gable entrance. During the 1950s and 1960s the eastern verandah and part of western verandah were enclosed, and in the 1990s the bathroom and kitchen were refurbished, an en-suite was built on the eastern verandah, part of sunroom was relined, and the balustrade on the southern and western side was repaired. During Thorp's tenure, the house became known as "Moreton House". Mill managers continued to use the house until the mill closed in 2003.

== Description ==
The former Moreton Central Mill staff houses stand immediately east of the former mill site on elevated ground at the western ends of Mill and Bury Streets, Nambour. The mill manager's residence stands on sloping ground on Bury Street and the two staff cottages stand on level ground on Mill Street directly north of the manager's residence.

=== Former mill manager's residence ===
The planning and exterior and interior fabric show the extent of the early house and reflect changes made, particularly those of the 1930s and more recently.

The form of the early rectangular-plan house and projecting rectangular kitchen wing is evident in the external walls and the verandahs to the west, south and east and sunroom to the north. The house is timber-framed, clad with tongue and groove boards to the south and fibrous cement sheeting to the enclosed east and west verandahs. The kitchen wing, projecting to the north, is clad with weatherboards and has a later small skillion extension and back stairs to the east. The early house is sheltered by hipped roofs clad with corrugated metal sheeting and stands on a combination of concrete and steel post stumps infilled with timber palings. A chamferboard-clad rectangular extension to the north incorporates the earlier north verandah, is sheltered by a gabled roof and has banks of obscure clear and coloured glass casement windows to the east and north sides. Concrete block walls enclose a subfloor area at the northeast corner.

At the front of the house a projecting gable entrance to the west end opens onto the front verandah. The south wall onto the front verandah is of post and rail construction with a single-skin of vertical tongue and groove timber boards. A door from the enclosed west verandah, a central entrance door and two sets of french doors from the bedrooms open onto the front verandah. An opening for earlier french doors east of the central entrance doorway is infilled with vertical timber boards.

The central entrance door opens into a large living room off which the main bedroom opens to the west, a smaller bedroom to the east and sunroom extension to the north. The kitchen is at the northwest corner of the house opening off the sunroom. Enclosed with fibrous cement sheeting, the verandahs to the west and east accommodate a study and laundry to the west and an ensuite bathroom and part of a bedroom to the east.

There is a range of wall and ceiling treatments, floor coverings and joinery through the house. Reflecting a typical 1930s interior treatment, the walls and ceilings of the living room, main bedroom and parts of the smaller bedrooms to the east are lined with battened fibrous cement sheeting. A simple arch springing from tapered narrow posts divides the living room. These rooms have doors and architraves typical of the 1930s. Dividing partitions and linings in the sunroom and the fitout to the kitchen and bathrooms are recent. Other walls and ceilings are lined with fibrous cement sheeting. Floors are carpeted throughout except for tiles to bathrooms, kitchen and laundry.

The house stands in a large garden with a number of mature trees and shrubs and plantings within concrete-edged garden beds. The earlier tennis court is evident as a raised area to the west side. A hillshoist stands to the north east. Three concrete steps cut into the grassed footpath to Bury Street lead to a decorative metal entrance gate that is framed by two tall shaped timber posts. A timber side gate within the west side fence opens to the former mill site and a decorative metal gate opens to the easement and cottages to the north. Timber fences and hedges run around the boundaries.

=== Cottage No. 1 : 19 Mill Street ===
The planning and exterior and interior fabric show the extent of the early cottage and reflect changes made over time, some more recently.

Standing on low steel posts, the cottage at 19 Mill Street is timber framed, clad with weatherboards and sheltered by a pyramid roof clad with corrugated metal sheeting. The cottage has a partly open front verandah to Mill Street and a hipped roof kitchen wing extension to the rear southeast corner. The north wall onto the verandah has exposed timber studs with a single skin of horizontal chamferboards. Elsewhere the cottage is clad with weatherboards except the north end of the enclosed western verandah, which is clad with a battened fibrous cement sheeting.

The plan works off a central corridor from the front entrance to the living room which incorporates the enclosed rear verandah. Bedrooms open off the corridor and living room. A front room to the west of the corridor opens onto the living room. An early window frame and sill opens from the front room to the west verandah. The verandah side of this wall is lined with battened fibrous cement sheeting. The kitchen wing has a contemporary fitout. Other interiors are lined with fibrous cement sheeting. Joinery and aluminium sliding windows are recent as are the front and rear timber steps, the skillion roof to the south and the balustrading to the front verandah.

The cottage stands in a small garden with grassed areas, garden beds, trees and shrubs. A set of concrete steps cut into a high retaining wall to Mill Street climb to a concrete path leading to the front entrance. The property is bounded front and back with a hollow metal pipe and chain wire fence.

=== Cottage No. 2 : 17 Mill Street ===
The planning and exterior and interior fabric show the extent of the early cottage and reflect changes made over time.

Lowset on concrete and brick stumps, the 17 Mill Street cottage is timber-framed and clad with weatherboards. The main part of the cottage is sheltered by a pyramid roof truncated on the west side and clad with corrugated metal sheeting. There are two hipped roof extensions to the south.

A steep flight of concrete steps cut into the retaining wall to Mill Street alight onto a concrete path that finishes at a set of low timber steps to the open front verandah. The verandah balustrade is infilled with weatherboards and the floorboards are painted. Notches for mortise and tenon joints to the verandah posts may indicate the location of earlier balustrading. The front entrance door opens from the verandah into a central living area which is divided by a partition lined with vertical timber boards.

The plan works off the central living area which flows through to the southern extensions which accommodate dining, kitchen, laundry and bathroom. The north part of the living space opens through two sets of french doors onto an enclosed east verandah and through four-panelled timber doors to each of two bedrooms to the west. The walls and partitions to the north part of the living area and partitions to the bedrooms are of single skin post and rail construction with vertical tongue and groove timber boards. The west wall of bedroom two and part of bedroom one are lined with horizontal boards. A notch in the rail on the east side of bedroom one and the horizontal lining to the west may indicate the location of a previous partition. The ceilings of the bedrooms and living room are lined with narrow timber boards and have timber-framed sash windows with obscure patterned glazing. The partitions to the dining room and the kitchen and the east side of the south end of the living room are lined with vertical timber boards. The other partitions are lined with fibrous cement sheeting. The ceilings to these areas are lined with timber boards.

The east verandah is lined with fibrous cement sheeting and has a sloping painted timber floor. The bathroom and kitchen have contemporary fitouts. There is a single skin exposed stud framed partition between the laundry and kitchen. The rear door from the laundry opens onto a painted concrete ramp which descends to a concrete slab and shed to the southwest.

There is a range of joinery through the cottage, some typical of a 1930s idiom and others more recent. Floors are covered with carpet or vinyl.

The garden has grassed areas, garden beds, trees and shrubs. A hillshoist stands in the southeast corner.

=== Walkway between cottages ===
A narrow walkway runs between the cottages. A timber and chainwire fence runs to each side of a concrete path and there are metal gates to the north and south entrances.

=== Assorted sheds ===
There are a number of timber and corrugated iron sheds scattered across the cottage sites.

=== Easement ===
A vehicle easement runs to the west of the manager's house and turns east terminating at the rear of the cottage at 17 Mill Street.

=== Retaining wall ===
A high, battered rock and concrete retaining wall runs along the front of the two cottages to Mill Street. Three sets of steep concrete steps run within the wall accessing each cottage and the walkway between them.

=== Signal ===
A metal pole with signals and two signs CANE TRAIN MOVING is bolted to the footpath at the northeast end of 17 Mill Street.

=== Moreton Central Sugar Mill Cane Tramway ===
Part of the Nambour section of the Moreton Central Sugar Mill Cane Tramway runs along Mill Street in front of the cottages at 17 and 19 Mill Street.

== Heritage listing ==
The former Moreton Central Sugar Mill Worker's Housing was listed on the Queensland Heritage Register on 16 May 2008 having satisfied the following criteria.

The place is important in demonstrating the evolution or pattern of Queensland's history.

As rare surviving evidence of the Moreton Central Sugar Mill, the mill staff housing is important in illustrating the development of the sugar industry in Queensland, and the impact of the sugar industry on the settlement of the North Coast region. The sugar industry influenced the pattern of growth of Nambour as a prominent mill town and regional centre, and influenced the pattern of settlement of the associated farms and townships of the region during the twentieth century.

The place demonstrates rare, uncommon or endangered aspects of Queensland's cultural heritage.

The sugar industry was an important and vital part of the economy of the region and very little physical evidence survives of the industry particularly the mill and its associated infrastructure. The mill staff housing is rare surviving evidence of the sugar industry in the region illustrating a way of life that was once common but has now vanished.

It is known that Moreton Central Sugar Mill constructed a number of staff houses and a bachelors' quarters. These three surviving dwellings remain as the only evidence of staff housing purpose-built by the Moreton Central Sugar Mill within the mill precinct.

The place is important in demonstrating the principal characteristics of a particular class of cultural places.

As a group the houses are good examples of purpose-built staff accommodation. The houses demonstrate the practice common to a number of industries of providing housing to encourage workers to an area especially in isolated areas or new towns where accommodation is not readily available. Provision of accommodation for senior staff and some of the mill workers was the usual practice for the company or co-operative within the central mill system in Queensland.

In form and setting, the houses illustrate the practice of providing a hierarchy of size and amenity in housing corresponding with seniority within the company, e.g. the manager's residence is more substantial and set in a larger garden reflecting its function as accommodation for the manager in comparison to the cottages which were for less senior staff. In their close proximity to the mill site, the houses illustrate the practice of constructing staff accommodation close to the mill or place of work or within an associated precinct.
