= Inkerman Sugar Mill =

Coordinates: 19.6438°S 147.4007°E

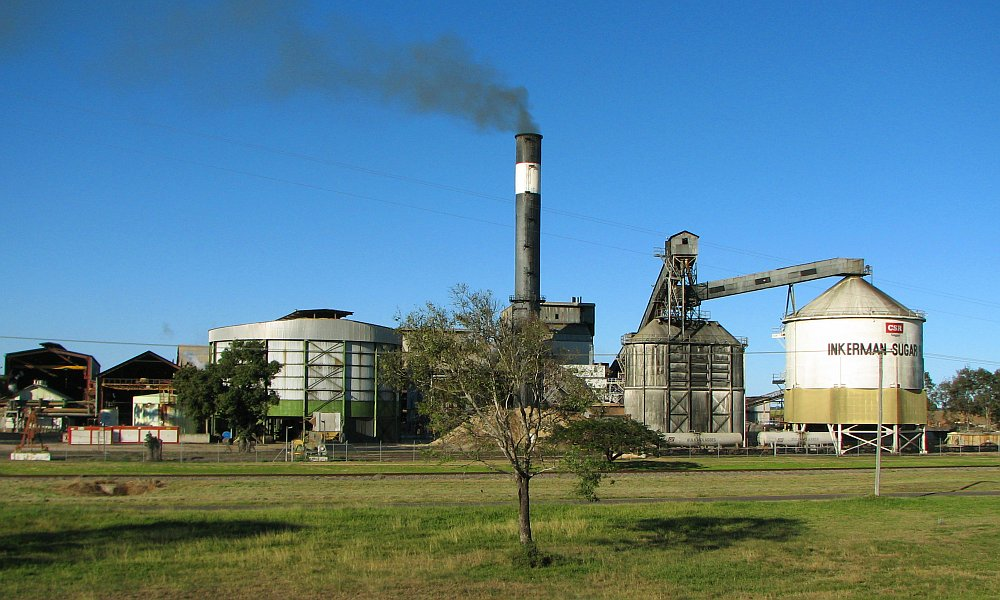
Inkerman Sugar Mill (Home Hill, Queensland) - September 2006

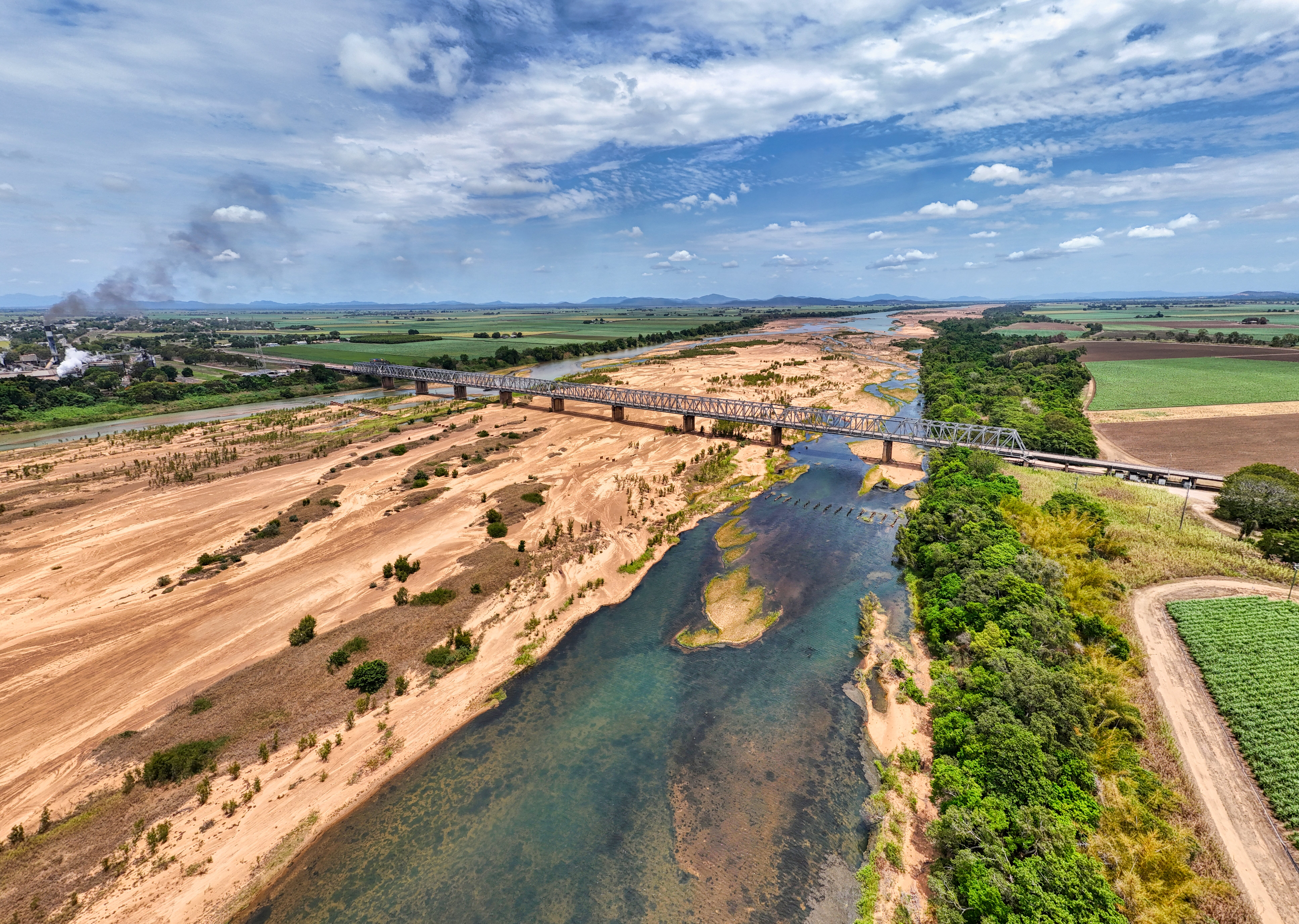
The Burdekin Bridge over the Burdekin River and the Sugar Mill on the left

The Inkerman Sugar Mill is located in Home Hill, Queensland on the banks of the Burdekin River. The mill was designed and built by the Scottish engineer J Pickering under the instruction of John Drysdale, using machinery manufactured by Geo Fletcher and Company of Derby, England. It was completed in 1914 and began crushing the following year.

From March 2010, it is operated by Wilmar Sugar Australia Pty Ltd. Before that it was operated by CSR Limited.

== See also ==
- List of sugar mills in Queensland
- List of tramways in Queensland
