= Plane Creek Sugar Mill =

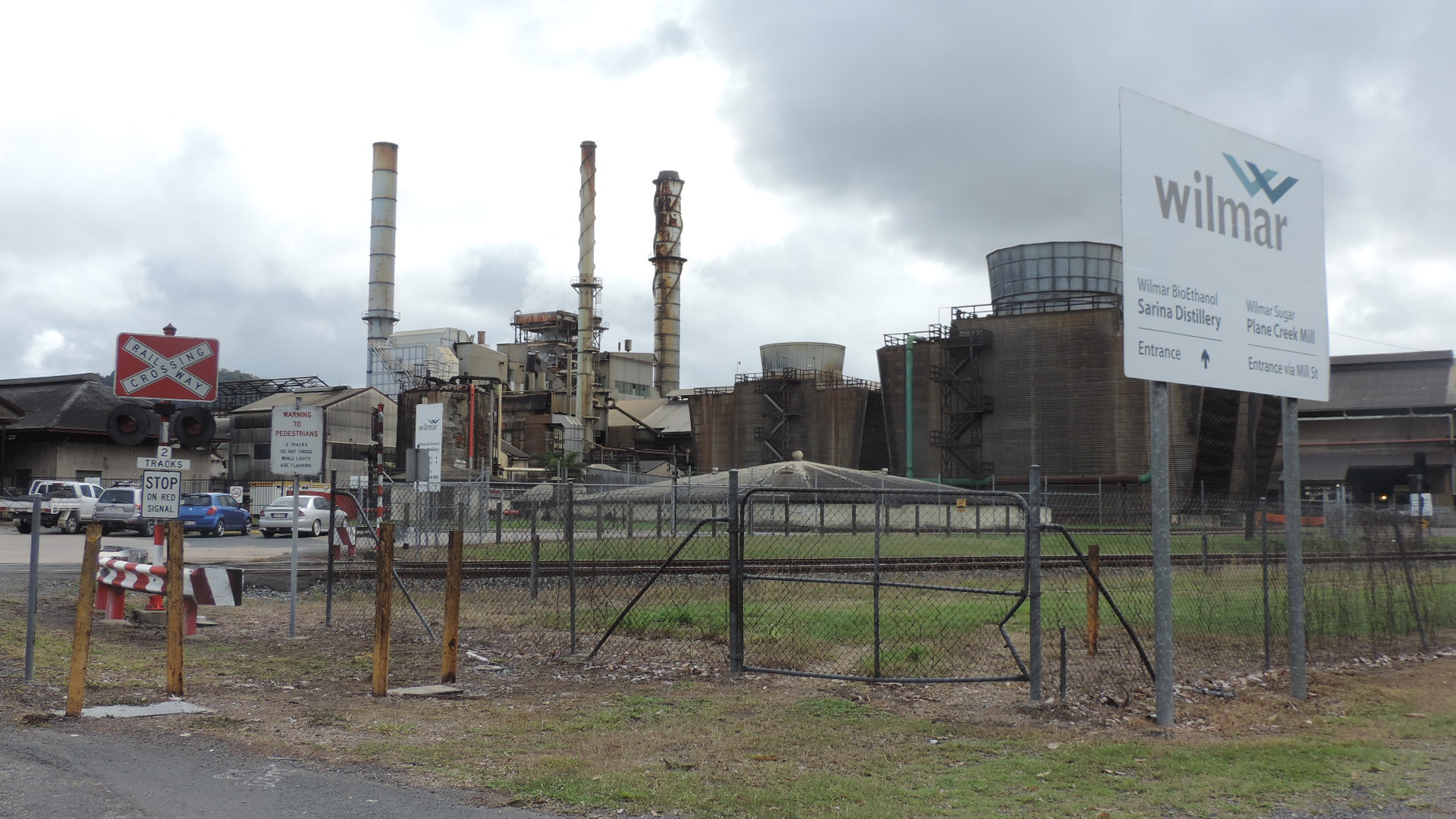
Plane Creek Sugar Mill, Sarina, 2016

Plane Creek Sugar Mill is a sugar mill in Sarina, Queensland, Australia. It is owned and operated by Wilmar Sugar Australia.

== History ==
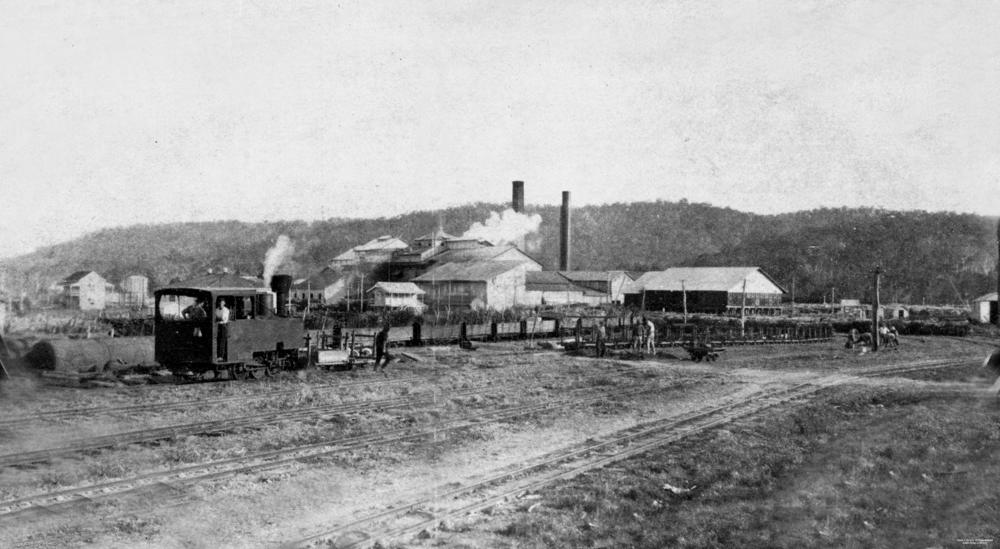
Plane Creek Sugar Mill, 1928

The Plane Creek Sugar Mill opened in 1896. It was owned and operated by the Plane Creek Central Mill Company Limited. It was funded with a loan of £65,000 from the Queensland Government under the Sugar Works Guarantee Act. The mill machinery was built by Walkers Limited in Maryborough. A 15-mile tramline connected the mill to a wharf at the mouth of Louisa Creek (21°16′15″S 149°15′58″E) for shipping the sugar.

The loan from the Queensland Government was fully repaid in 1920.

In 1925, a factory was built next to the mill to process the molasses produced by the sugar refining into ethanol. Ted Theodore, the Queensland Premier, hoped to use the ethanol as a motor fuel.

In 1926, a wier was built on Plane Creek to provide a more reliable water supply to the mill, with a second weir built in 1935.

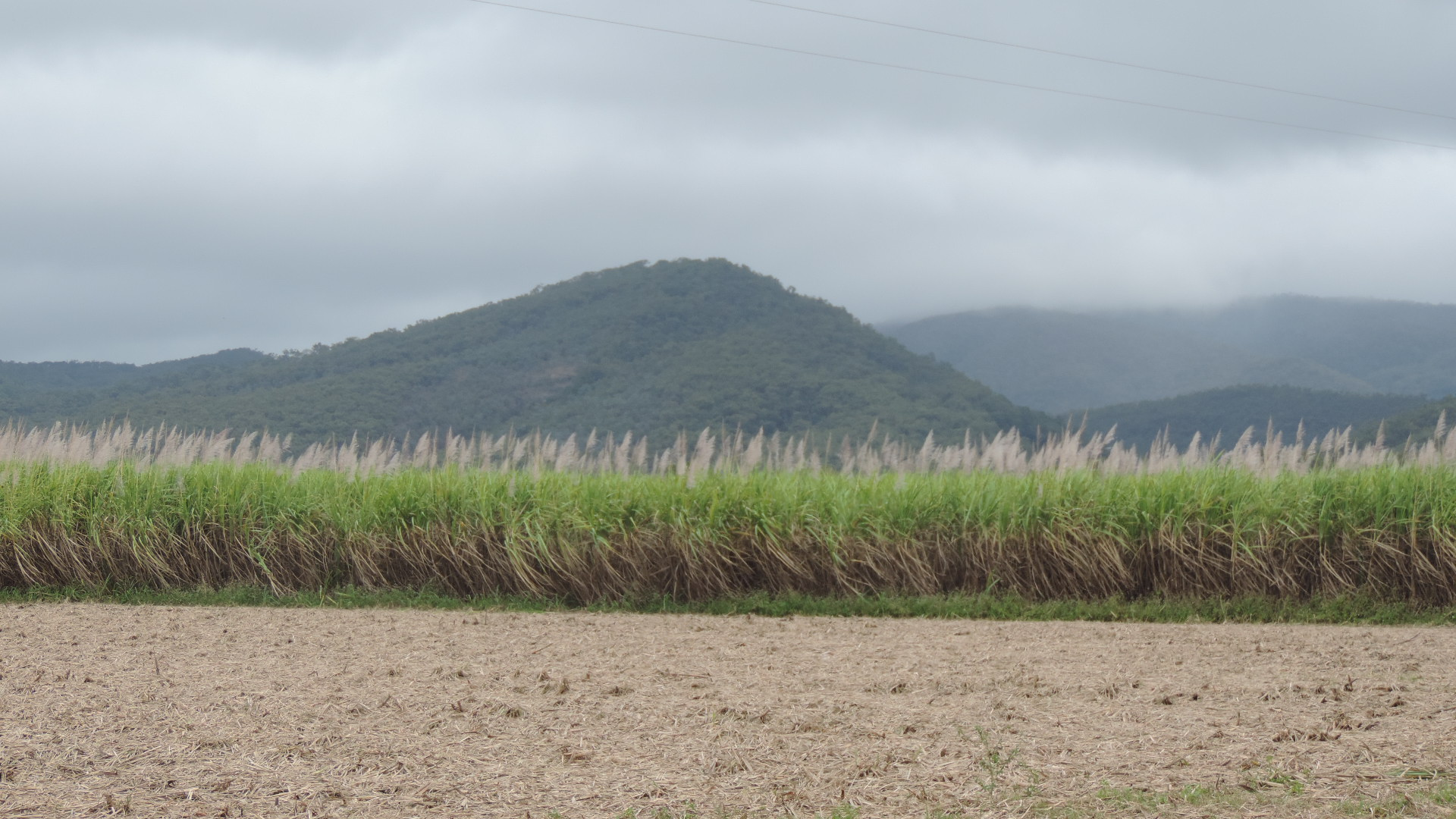
Sugar cane fields east of Flaggy Rock, 2016

In the 1920s, construction of the North Coast railway line enabled sugar cane to be transported to the mill from a more widespread area, as far south as Flaggy Rock.

In 1974 it was sold to Pioneer Sugar Mills and then sold in 1987 by CSR Limited. As of 2016, it is one of the 8 sugar mills in Queensland owned by Wilmar Sugar.

== See also ==
- List of sugar mills in Queensland
- List of tramways in Queensland
