= Habana Tramline Causeway and Wharf Site =

Historic road in Queensland, Australia

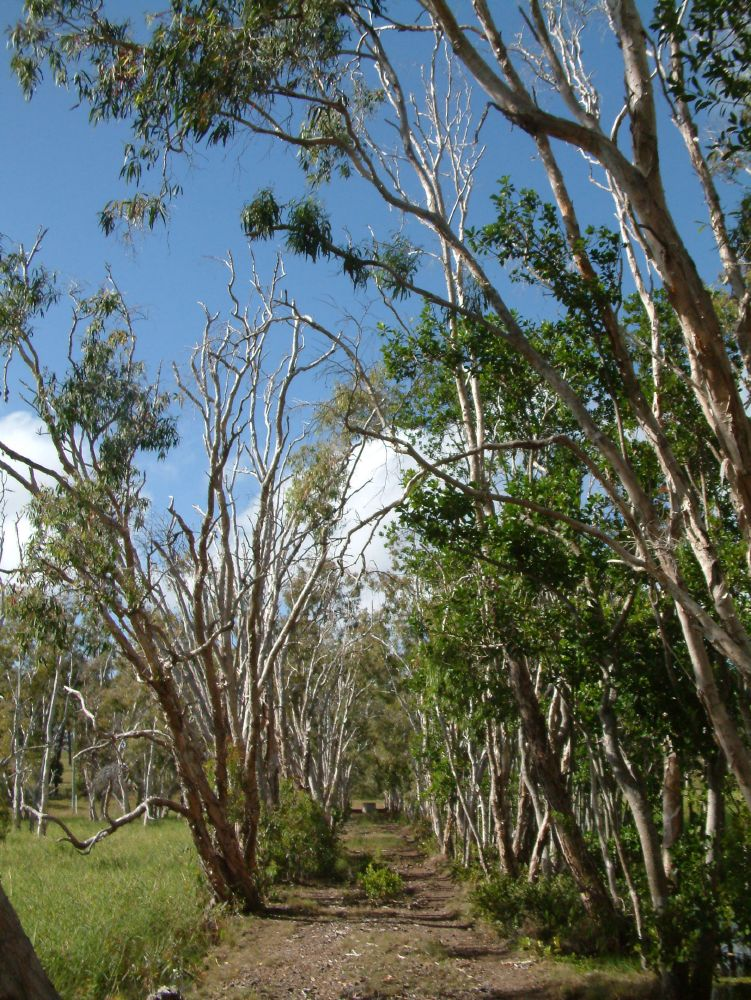
- Habana Causeway, 2006

- Location within Queensland Location within Australia
- 20.9925°S 149.0392°E
- Location: Between Habana Wharf Road and Constant Creek, Habana, Mackay Region, Queensland, Australia

Queensland Heritage Register
- Official name: Habana Tramline Causeway and Wharf Site, Habana Wharf Road
- Type: state heritage (built)
- Designated: 14 May 2010
- Reference no.: 602749
- Significant period: 1882-1901

Habana Tramline Causeway and Wharf Site is a heritage-listed causeway between Habana Wharf Road and Constant Creek, Habana, Mackay Region, Queensland, Australia. It is also known as Habana Wharf Road. It was added to the Queensland Heritage Register on 14 May 2010.

== History ==
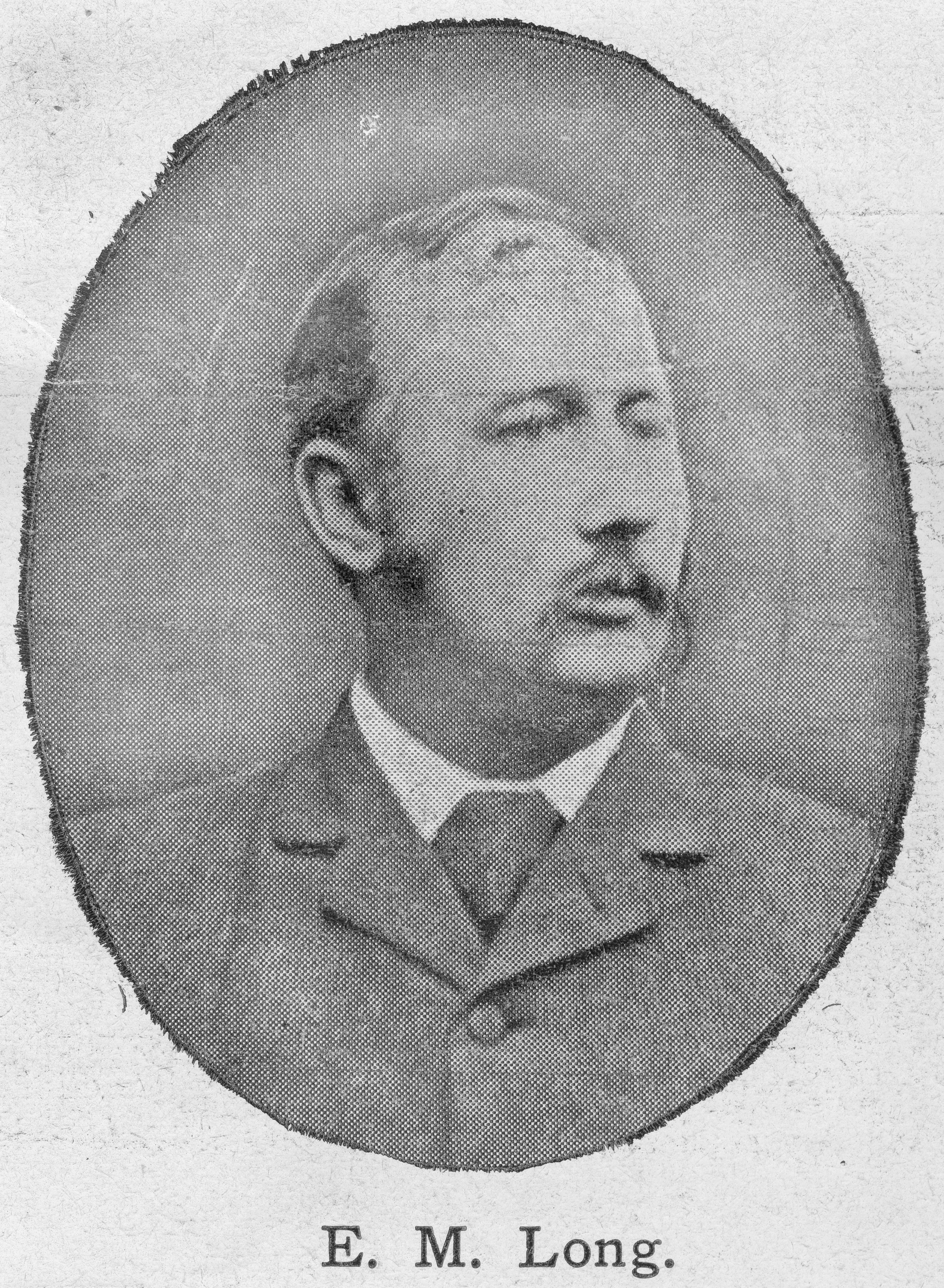
Edward Maitland Long, sugar plantation owner in Habana

The stone and gravel causeway near the end of Habana Wharf Road was built during 1882 with South Sea Islander (Melanesian) labour, to provide tramline access to a wharf on the bank of Constant Creek near to where it empties into the ocean about 14 kilometres (8.7 mi) north-west of Mackay. The wharf was built in late 1882 or early 1883, to service the Habana sugar plantation, owned by Edward Maitland Long (1848-1905) and William Robertson. Long was a direct descendant of the early sugar planter Samuel Long (Jamaican politician).

The history of the Mackay district is closely linked to the sugar industry. The City of Mackay is named for John Mackay, who entered the valley of the Pioneer River in 1860 and established a pastoral run there the following year. In 1862 a settlement was begun on the south bank of the river and by 1863 Mackay had been surveyed and the first lots of land sold. It was gazetted as a port of entry and a customs house was opened. The first sugar plantation was established near Mackay in 1865 and the first small sugar mill was opened in 1868.

South Sea Islanders (referred to at the time as Kanakas) made a major contribution to Queensland's early sugar industry. Between 1863 and 1904, some fifty thousand Islanders were brought to Queensland as indentured labourers usually bound by a three-year contract. The Islanders provided cheap manual labour, but were also believed to be essential in a climate that was considered too harsh for white manual labourers. Most came from eighty islands in Melanesia, mainly those included in present day Vanuatu and the Solomon Islands. The method of recruitment remains a matter of debate, but it seems that at least some of the recruiting during the initial phase was by kidnapping and deception.

Islanders made a vital contribution to the sugar industry, performing virtually all of the field work connected with the industry during its first phase of development. Only a minority stayed on; most returned to their islands at the conclusion of their contract period.

The Pioneer Valley, one of Australia's largest sugar producing areas has always had the largest South Sea Islander population in Queensland. They began arriving in the Mackay district from 1867, and by 1875 there were about 1700 in the area, comprising 45 percent of the total population. Over two thousand Islanders still reside in the Mackay region.

Although an 1875 outbreak of the crop disease, rust, caused some foreclosures and sales, by 1876 the Mackay district had 18 sugar mills and 5,568 acres (2,253 ha) of land were under sugar cultivation. The sugar industry boomed in the early 1880s and Mackay prospered as a port and as a commercial and administrative centre, drawing business from nearby pastoral holdings and the sugar plantations being developed along the river.

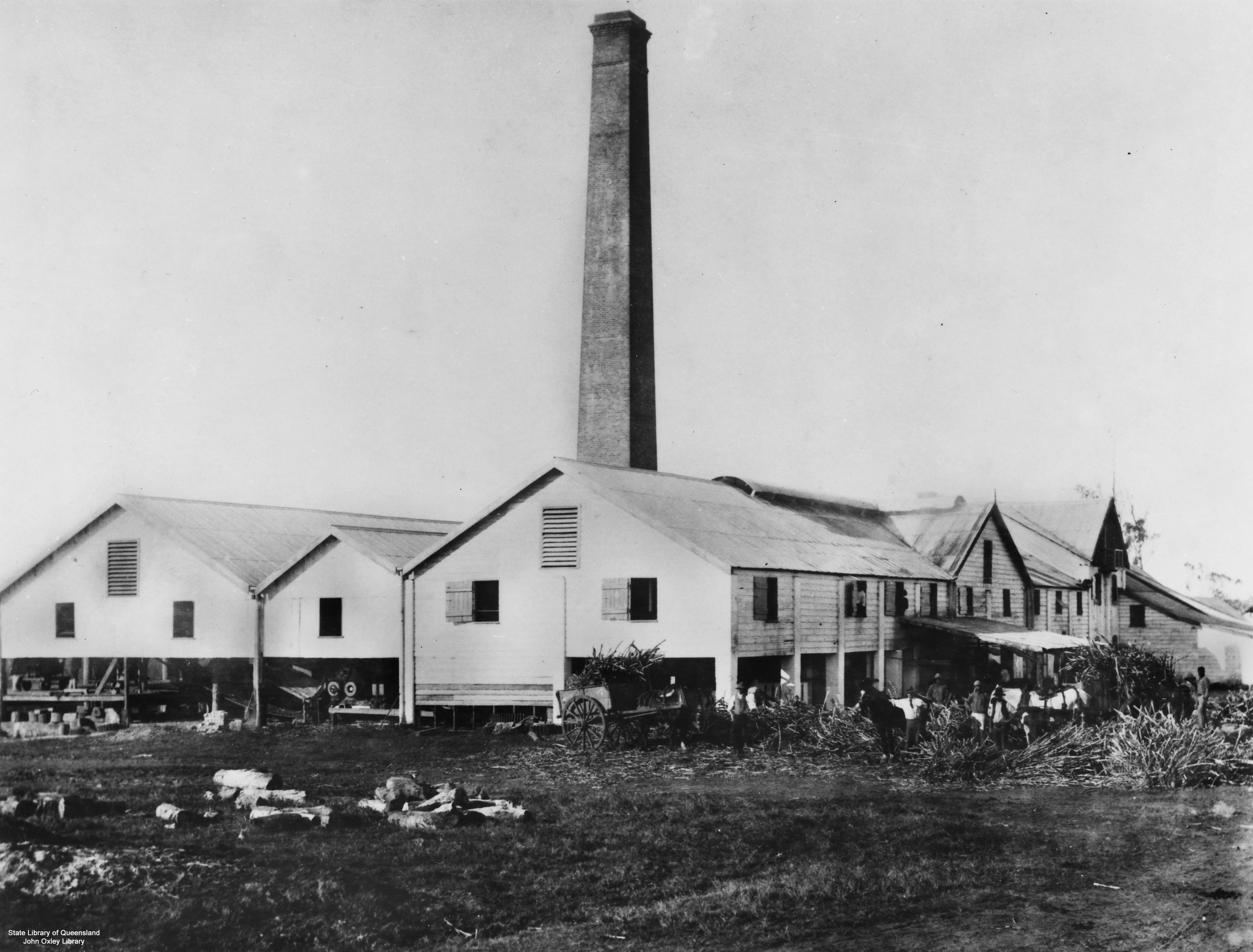
Habana Sugar Mill, 1895

The period 1881 to 1884 also marked the zenith of the plantation system of growing sugar cane. This system was characterised by large land holdings that were worked with indentured South Sea Islander labour. Each plantation built its own sugar mill to crush its cane. Twelve mills opened near Mackay during the early 1880s, including at Habana, on the plantation of Long and Robertson. The Colonial Sugar Refinery (CSR) opened a large mill at Homebush in 1883, and in the Mackay district 19,320 acres (7,820 ha) of cane were being cultivated under the plantation system by 1884. However, this system depended on the importation of South Sea Islander labour, and it soon suffered a number of blows.

A drop (of a third) in the price of sugar in 1884, and increasing numbers of small selectors and farmers in the area, began to challenge the plantation system. Small farmers did not like having to crush their sugar crops at plantation mills, where they were a secondary consideration. Sir Samuel Griffith, Queensland Premier (1883–1888 and 1890–1893), sought to break the plantations into small farms. This accorded with the preferred model for the development of Queensland: small yeomen farmers working their own land with the help of their families.

Legislation aimed at applying this model, together with humanitarian and union concerns, as well as racism, ultimately formed the basis for opposition to and brought about the eventual cessation of the trade in South Sea Islander labour. Church and mission groups opposed it on ethical and humanitarian grounds. And labour unions, exclusively white, felt threatened by cheap non-European labour and were concerned that employers would use Islanders to undermine working conditions.

From 1884, Islander labour was progressively restricted. In 1884 an amendment to the Pacific Islanders Labourers Act 1880 banned South Sea Islanders from a range of work, and restricted them to menial jobs in agriculture. The Pacific Islanders Act of 1885 sought to end the recruitment of South Sea Island labour by 1890; this was repealed in 1892 on economic grounds. However the Pacific Island Labourers (Extension) Act 1892 further barred them from construction work on plantation roads and tramways. Finally after Federation in 1901, two pieces of Commonwealth legislation put an end to the trade: the Immigration Restriction Act (1901) and the Pacific Island Labourers Act (1901), the former being where the various policies that came to be termed the "White Australia Policy" began. It aimed to exclude all non-European immigrants; the latter legislation required an end to recruitment of South Sea Islanders from March 1904 and their deportation after December 1906. From 1904 to 1908, around 7000 people were deported. About 1200 were granted residency, and an estimated 1000 others stayed on illegally in Australia.

Large central mills operated by groups of small farmers eventually supplanted the plantation mills, offering them economy of scale in allowing them to crush their crops at a large and efficient mill. The first two central mills in Queensland were opened near Mackay in the late 1880s, with government financial assistance. The Sugar Works Guarantee Act of 1893 extended the scope of government support to farmers wishing to establish central mills, and thus by the 1890s the small plantation mills on large estates were giving way to small farms and large central mills. The last of the Mackay district's plantation mills, Palms, closed in 1924.

From 1870 to 1876 EM Long owned the Branscombe Estate south of the Pioneer River near Walkerston, in partnership with GN Marten. A mill operated here from 1871 to 1884. In addition, Long and Marten owned the River Estate from 1871, with its mill being active from 1873 to 1891. During the 1870s Long also selected multiple blocks of land in the Habana area, north of the Pioneer River, or took over the leases of other selectors. William Robertson did the same, and the two men usually applied to buy their various selections several years after gaining a lease, to obtain deeds of grant.

The causeway and wharf site is to the north-east of the current settlement of Habana, and although the causeway begins on the former land of Henry Braby, his selection was an exception in the area in the 1880s, which was by then dominated by the landholdings of Long and Robertson.

Braby obtained the lease of selection number 640 in February 1881, for 10 years dating from January 1880, and he was issued with a deed of grant in 1886. A sugar engineer, Braby grew fruit on his selection until about 1894. An August 1880 survey of Braby's selection does not show a causeway, although a road (later Habana Wharf Road) was surveyed in the middle of his selection, terminating near where the start of the causeway would later be located.

In January 1882 Long requested, in a letter to the Colonial Secretary, the lease or purchase of a wharf frontage on Salt Water (Constant) Creek, "Upon which I am ancsious (sic) to erect a wharf for shipping purposes". An August 1882 letter from the Lands Office in Mackay, to the Under Secretary of Lands, Brisbane, noted that it was a good wharfage site, and that Long "has already incurred great expense in forming by embankment and drainage a long causeway (to carry a tramway) to this spot". A Special Lease, number 169, was granted in September 1882, for 14 years from 1 October 1882, and consisted of a 5-acre wedge of land, rental of £1 per acre per annum. However, the wharf site was not surveyed until February 1884, and a formal Lease for Special Purposes, under the Crown Lands Alienation Act of 1876, was issued in July 1884, for a period of 14 years from 1 September 1882.

The official 1884 survey shows the causeway route, identical to its route in 2010. The causeway began on Brady's selection 640, and then crossed an area of salt marsh, before entering the wharf site. The documentary evidence suggests that the causeway was built between January and August 1882, and that the wharf was built after September 1882. By 1884, a wharf and store were extant at the site. It appears that Long initially used the causeway for horse-drawn transport before installing a tramway.

South Sea Islander oral histories state that the Habana wharf and the built-up road (causeway) were constructed using South Sea Islander labour. Edward Long relied heavily on South Sea Islander labour to develop his plantations. In a Sydney Morning Herald article dated 27 August 1884 he was quoted as stating: 'The work of a sugar plantation could not be carried on without kanakas. We have them for three years and during that time they are a constant and reliable labour. If you have whites and there should happen to be any disagreement, say at crushing time, they may leave you and your produce will be left on the field.'

Oral tradition also asserts that many South Sea Islanders were hurt or killed working with horses at this time, as they were unfamiliar with the animals. The graves of those killed on the project are reportedly on a hill about 1 kilometre (0.62 mi) from the wharf site.

During early 1883 all the machinery for the Habana mill was transported through the Habana wharf, then across rough terrain some 4.5 miles (7.2 km) to the mill site. The mouth of Constant Creek was navigable for steamers up to 80 long tons (81 t). Apparently both the Habana and Plane Creek (1896) mills used tramways, leading to their own wharves on convenient creeks, to avoid the cost of carting sugar to Mackay. Rails purchased from Long by the Racecourse Mill, for a rail extension at Cattle Creek, were also shipped out through the Habana wharf in 1904.

On Saturday 21 July 1883 the Mackay Mercury reported that there had been a ceremonial first cane crush "last Thursday" for the opening of Long and Robertson's mill at Habana, which afterwards was celebrated with a ball held at the School of Arts in Mackay.

The Habana mill operated from 1883 to 1901. Long applied for a local school and a provisional school was opened c.1883. Long appears to have accepted the end of the plantation system, and from 1884 he pioneered the concept of leasing land to small farmers in order to supply his mill. By 1891 one quarter of Habana's crush came from farmers renting land from the company. Long also encouraged British migration, especially after 1889, and he was an early advocate of Japanese labourers, the first of whom arrived at Habana c. 1893.

By 1893 there were 85 whites working at Habana mill, with 315 Islanders employed. The farming population consisted of 100 white men and women, and 82 Islanders. By 1896 Long and Robertson had 1300 plantation acres under cane, with 17 miles (27 km) of tramway, and 26 farmers were supplying Habana Mill. That same year Long applied to renew the lease on the wharf site, and this was granted for ten years, at £2 per acre per annum.

In 1896 Long was also the managing director of the Pleystowe Central Mill Company, which illustrates his attempt to straddle the two main systems of sugar production. However, controversy surrounded the dealings between Long and the Government over the establishment of the Pleystowe mill; specifically, over the timing of his land purchases and the granting of government financial assistance for the mill.

By 1900 Long had a high, if controversial, public profile. He was the first chairman of the Mackay Harbour Board, (1897–1903), and was a Pioneer Shire councillor between 1880 and 1881 and then 1897 to 1900. In 1901, the year of the last crush at Habana mill, he was the acting chairman of the Central Sugar Millers' Association of Queensland.

A government inquiry into the Pleystowe mill's affairs was announced in February 1902, due to growers' complaints. Long, in hospital in Brisbane at the time, was exonerated of any major misdemeanour. However, the government foreclosed on Pleystowe Central Mill in 1903. It continued to operate, but Long was replaced as manager. Early in 1905 Long fell ill again, and he returned to England for a year's holiday. He died on board ship in the Thames Estuary, 4 August 1905, aged 63.

The Habana Provisional School closed in 1906, and in 1907 Robertson decided not to renew the lease on the wharf site. The Land Commissioner, in a letter to the Under Secretary for Public Lands, noted that it was not likely the wharf would be required by anyone for some time to come.

In 1908 a tramline reached Habana from Pleystowe Central Mill. The Habana area increased its population in the 1910s and 1920s, through small scale cane farming and dairying. A state school was opened in 1917; immigrants arrived from Malta, Italy, Russia, Greece and India to provide farm labour. By the mid-1920s, there were seven central mills operating around the Mackay area, in contrast to the 30 plantation mills that had been operating in the mid-1880s.

The Habana wharf remained as a popular fishing spot for some time, and still existed in the 1930s; however, nothing remains visible of the wharf structure today. To the south of the tramway route across the sand to the wharf site there is a large raised area of stones, about one foot above the surrounding terrain, which may have served as a turn-around point for the trams, and as a work area. Some large decaying posts near and within the mangroves along Constant Creek may be from boat launching activities post-dating the wharf's commercial use. Vehicle access along the causeway has been blocked.

== Description ==
The start of the 1 kilometre (0.62 mi) causeway route is in a field at the north end of the metalled Habana Wharf Road. The causeway, marked by an avenue of paperbark (Melaleuca) trees, is visible to the left as Habana Wharf Road bends to the right towards a private residence.

For its initial section the causeway is stone pitched, low-lying, and prone to flooding. It heads west north west and the avenue of trees ends at rising, cleared ground. The route crosses this higher ground before changing direction several degrees to the north. The route then continues as a stone and gravel causeway, standing more than 30 centimetres (12 in) above the surrounding salt marsh. During its course it makes two slight turns to the west, until it is heading almost due west through bush. There are no visible relics of the tramway on the causeway. At one point the causeway intersects a track heading north to a clearing that was the site of a residence. Soon after this point the causeway ends at a sandy beach.

A tramway alignment, marked by loose stones and multiple fragments of corroded tramway line of various lengths, continues across the sand towards a line of mangroves. There are several large posts near or within the mangroves, both standing and laid flat. Various other corroded metal artefacts are scattered about. There are two narrow gaps in the line of mangroves by which the creek bank can be accessed.

To the south of the rail-alignment is a raised platform of stones, with more fragments of corroded railway line and other metal artefacts. On the other side of the mangroves is the steep muddy bank of a tributary of Constant Creek. No wharf remnants are visible on the creek bank.

== Heritage listing ==
Habana Tramline Causeway and Wharf Site was listed on the Queensland Heritage Register on 14 May 2010 having satisfied the following criteria.

The place is important in demonstrating the evolution or pattern of Queensland's history.

The Habana Tramline Causeway and Wharf Site, developed ca1882, is a product of the 1880–1884 sugar boom in the Mackay district, and is important in demonstrating an early phase in the evolution of Queensland's sugar industry when the plantation system dominated. The causeway and wharf were built by South Sea Islander labour to serve the Habana Sugar Mill (1883–1901), a plantation mill owned by well-known public and sugar industry figure Edward Maitland Long. The plantation system, dependent on South Sea Islander indentured labour, peaked in the early 1880s, after which it was gradually supplanted by the central mill system serving small cane farms worked by white labour.

The place demonstrates rare, uncommon or endangered aspects of Queensland's cultural heritage.

The substantially intact Habana Tramline Causeway provides rare surviving evidence of a large construction project undertaken with South Sea Islander labour before the Pacific Island Labourers (Extension) Act 1892 barred them from construction work on plantation roads and tramways.

The route of the causeway across salt marsh to a wharf site on a navigable creek, the raised profile of the causeway, and the remnants of the tramline, provide uncommon evidence of key transport infrastructure associated with a nineteenth century coastal Queensland sugar plantation.

The place has potential to yield information that will contribute to an understanding of Queensland's history.

The Habana wharf site, with its numerous metal tramway artefacts and raised stone work platform, has the archaeological potential to contribute to a greater understanding of the operation of a nineteenth century sugar plantation wharf.

The place has a special association with the life or work of a particular person, group or organisation of importance in Queensland's history.

The Habana Tramline Causeway and Wharf Site are important and now rare evidence of the significant contribution made by South Sea Islanders to the establishment of a viable sugar industry in colonial Queensland, including the establishment of its transport infrastructure. With a number of deaths of Islander labourers said to have occurred there during its construction, the place has a symbolic association with these people and the difficult lives they led while indentured to work in Australia.

== See also ==
- List of tramways in Queensland
