= Mackay Sugar =

Mackay Sugar is the largest sugar producer in Queensland and second largest sugar producer in Australia. In 2013, Mackay Sugar was inducted into the Queensland Business Leaders Hall of Fame.

== History ==
Mackay Sugar Limited (MSL) was formed through the merger of the Farleigh, Marian, North Eton, Cattle Creek and Racecourse (where the company is now located) sugar mill co-operatives in 1988 and the acquisition of the Pleystowe Mill in the same year. Each has a history dating back to the late 19th century. Over the ensuing two decades following the merger, a number of the mills were closed while a major refinery now capable of refining 450,000 tonnes was built at the Racecourse Mill in partnership with ED&F Man in 1993. Mackay Sugar is now a 25 per cent shareholder with Wilmar International (75 per cent) in both New Zealand Sugar Company and Sugar Australia Pty Ltd, Australia's largest refiner, purchaser and exporter of raw sugar. In 2012, Mackay Sugar acquired the Mossman Mill, one of the four sites on which it is currently milling cane.

The merger and subsequent consolidation of the local industry into a successful modern and progressive company owes much to the vision and leadership of Graham Davies AM who became the company's founding chairman. Significantly, during the merger process, the company honoured its promise that no worker would lose their job. Mackay Sugar, which produces around 800,000 tonnes of raw sugar and 200,000 tonnes of molasses each year, now has the scale to be globally competitive and resilient. It has turnover of approximately $400 million annually, employs over 600 people permanently and up to 1000 seasonally, thus contributing significantly to the economy of Queensland and of the Mackay Region in particular.

The company has begun implementing a 20 year diversification plan which, while enhancing its own business sustainability, also benefits the local community and the environment. The first clean, green, renewable energy project of the plan includes, construction of cogeneration plants the first of which, recently completed at the Racecourse Mill, now supplies 30 per cent of Mackay's electricity consumption from processing bagasse (sugarcane waste). Other elements of the plan include construction of ethanol plants and a yeast plant.

The successful production of sugar in Mackay for nearly 150 years through challenging weather and market conditions, is testament to the resilience and innovation of many generations of local farmers and the region's ideal growing conditions.

In 2013, Mackay Sugar was inducted into the Queensland Business Leader's Hall of Fame.

In February 2019, the German sugar producer Nordzucker announced the acquisition of a 70% stake in Mackay Sugar for A$60 million; Mackay Sugar will also receive an additional loan of up to $A60 million.
