= Wilmar Sugar Australia =

- Industry: Agriculture
- Founded: 1855

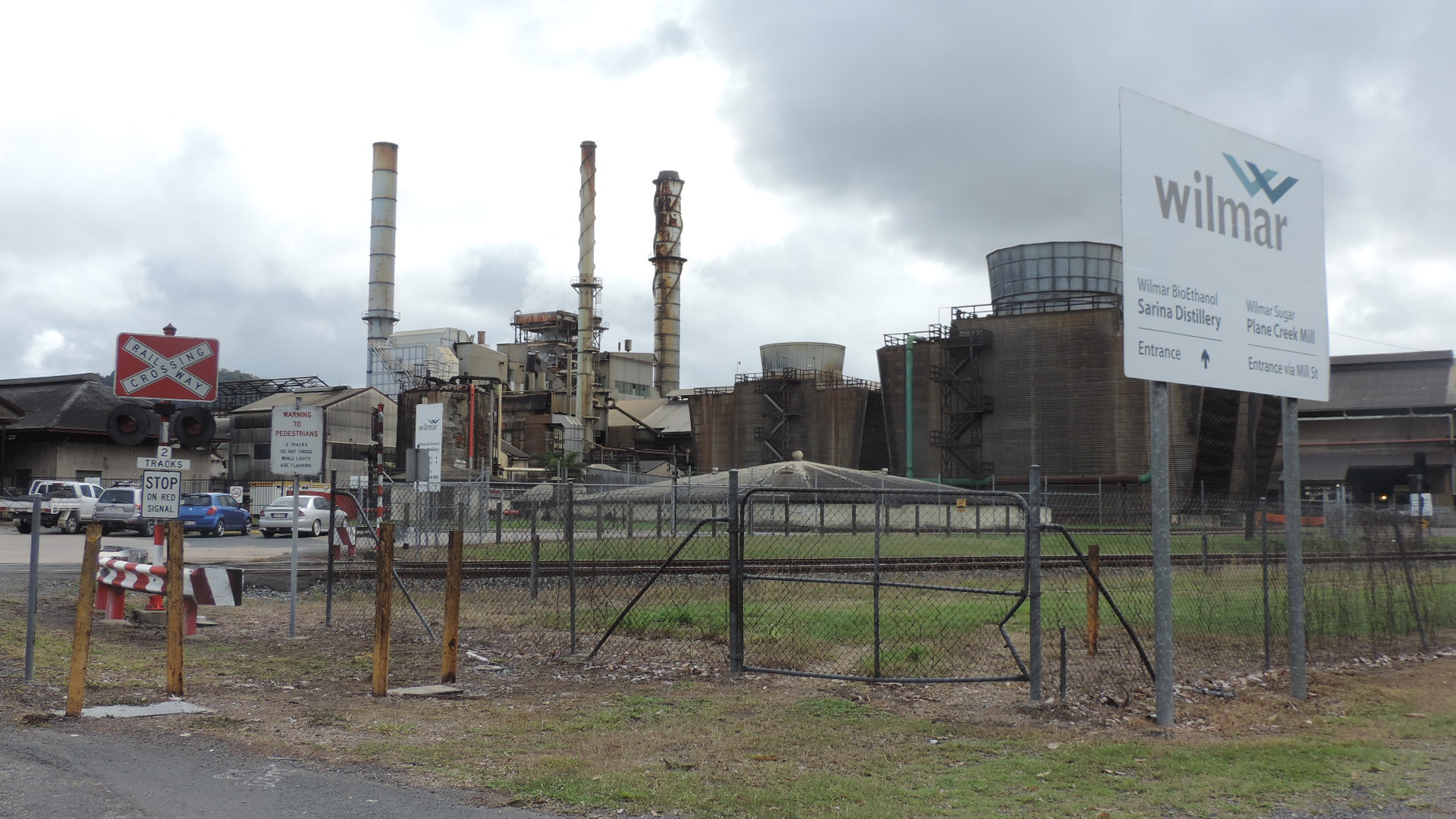
Plane Creek Sugar Mill, Sarina, operated by Wilmar Sugar, 2016

Wilmar Sugar Australia is a subsidiary of the Singapore-based company Wilmar International that incorporates sugar production business and renewable energy cogeneration. The principal product of Wilmar Sugar is raw sugar. By-products from the production of sugar include molasses (which is used to produce ethanol) and bagasse (which is used to generate electricity). It is Australia’s largest biomass renewable energy generator.

== History ==
The Company originates in the 1855 Colonial Sugar Refining Company, renamed CSR Limited in 1873. In 2009, CSR Limited created Sucrogen to handle its sugar activities then sold it to Wilmar International on 31 March 2010 for US$1.47 billion. Sucrogen sponsored the 2010 Sucrogen Townsville 400, and the 2011 Sucrogen Ayr Show. Wilmar subsequently renamed Sucrogen to Wilmar Sugar.

== Mills ==
Wilmar Sugar operates the following sugar mills in Queensland:

- Macknade Sugar Mill in Macknade, Shire of Hinchinbrook
- Victoria Sugar Mill at Victoria Plantation, Shire of Hinchinbrook
- Invicta Sugar Mill at Giru, Shire of Burdekin
- Kalamia Sugar Mill at Brandon, Shire of Burdekin
- Pioneer Sugar Mill at Brandon, Shire of Burdekin
- Inkerman Sugar Mill at Home Hill, Shire of Burdekin
- Proserpine Sugar Mill at Proserpine, Whitsunday Region
- Plane Creek Sugar Mill at Sarina, Mackay Region

== See also ==
- List of sugar mills in Queensland
