= Moreton Central Sugar Mill Cane Tramway =

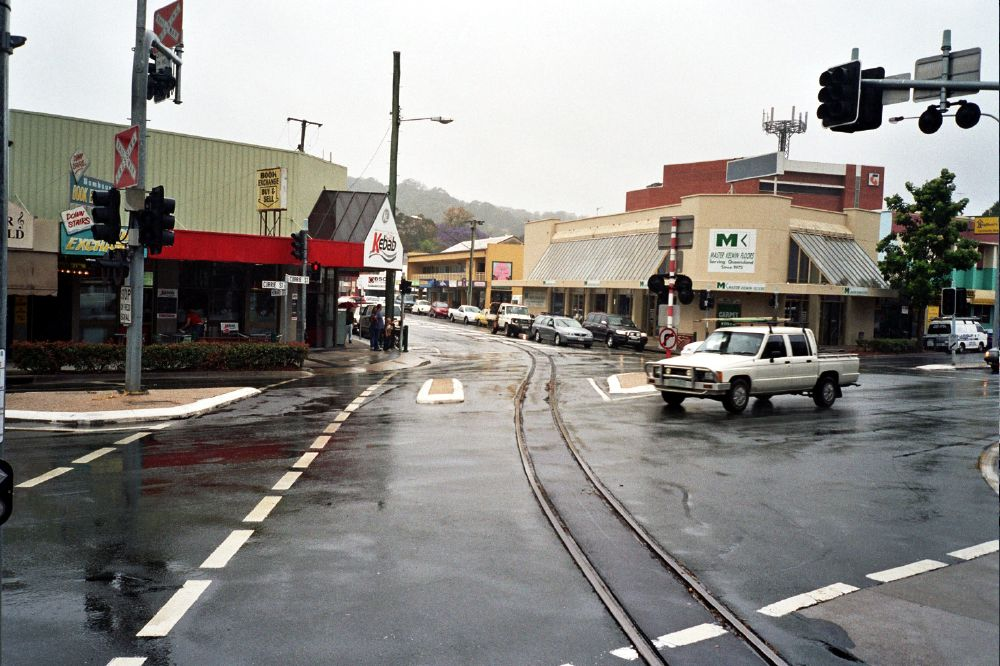
- Moreton Central Sugar Mill Cane Tramway in Nambour, 2004

- Location within Queensland Location within Australia
- 26.6267°S 152.9621°E
- Location: Mill Street, Currie Street, Howard Street, Nambour, Sunshine Coast Region, Queensland, Australia

History
- Design period: 1870s–1890s (late 19th century)
- Built: c. 1897

Queensland Heritage Register
- Official name: Nambour Section of the Moreton Central Sugar Mill Cane Tramway
- Type: state heritage (built)
- Designated: 7 February 2005
- Reference no.: 602522
- Significant period: 1897–onwards (fabric); 1897–2003 (historical use of line)
- Significant components: tramway

Moreton Central Sugar Mill Cane Tramway is a heritage-listed tramway at Mill Street, Currie Street, and Howard Street, in Nambour, Sunshine Coast Region, Queensland, Australia. It was built c. 1897. It was added to the Queensland Heritage Register on 7 February 2005.

== History ==
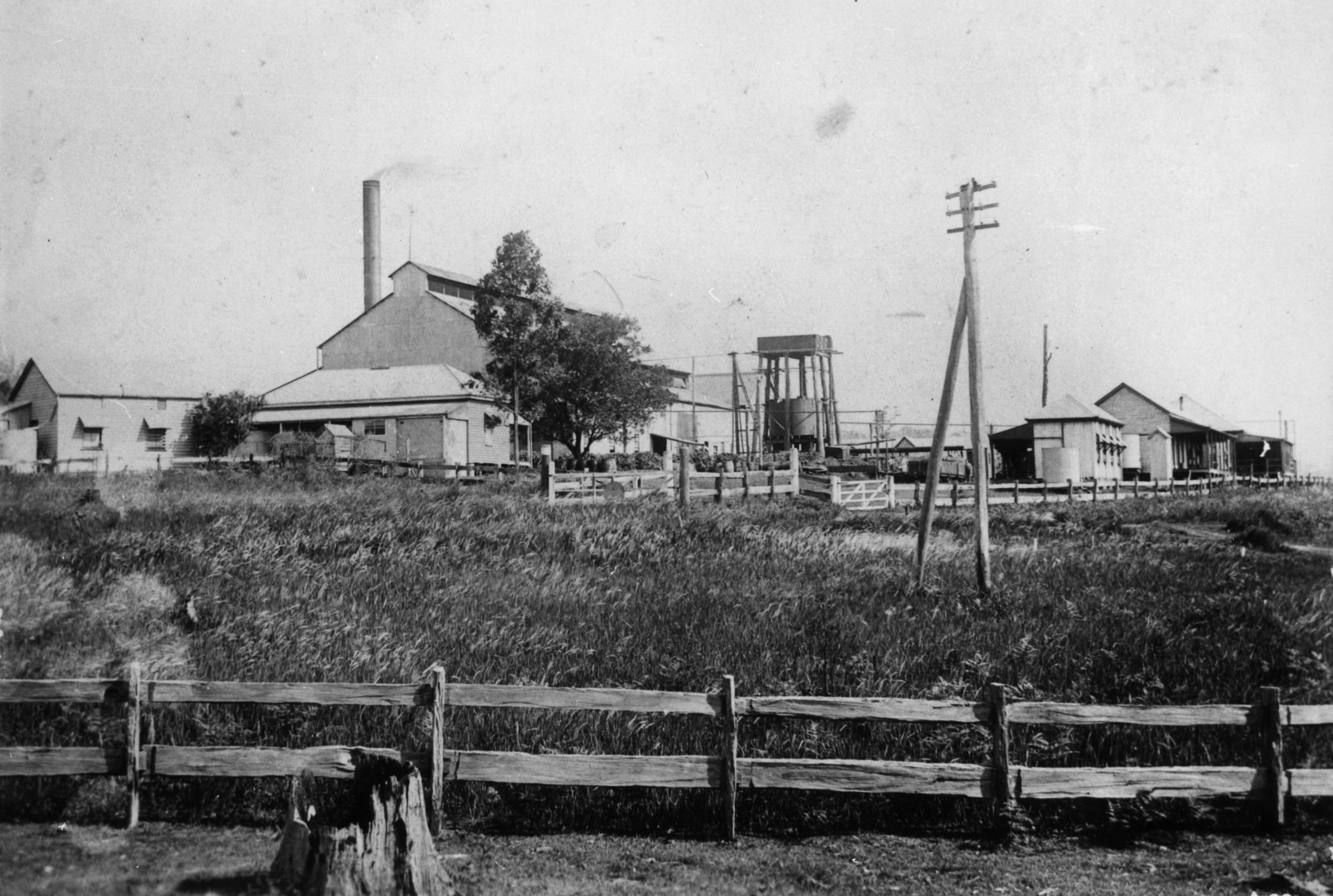
View of the Moreton Central Sugar Mill, circa 1910

The Moreton Central Sugar Mill opened for crushing in 1897. The tramway network that connected the mill with cane farms developed over many years and was in use until late 2003. It was a key factor in the success of the mill and the development of Nambour.

Sugar cane was first brought to Australia in 1788, but subsequent plantings at Sydney, Port Macquarie and Norfolk Island failed to be commercially viable. Captain Louis Hope grew a cane crop successfully in Queensland in 1862. By 1864 the first commercial sugar mill in Australia had been established by him at Ormiston and interest in growing sugar cane spread rapidly, encouraged by the Queensland Government. By 1867 an estimated 2,000 acres (810 ha) were under cane in the Brisbane area and by the end of the decade, cane had also been successfully established further north at Maryborough, Mackay and Bundaberg, where the warmer climate proved more suitable.

William Clark had experimented with sugar cane growing at Bli Bli in the 1860s, but in 1869 a group of Quakers took up land near the junction of the Mooloolah River and Sippy Creek, planted sugar cane and erected a crushing mill. This project was abandoned after severe flooding in the 1870s, but cane was grown successfully in other parts of the district including Buderim, where in 1876 Joseph Chapman Dixon, one of the Mooloolah growers, established a mill in order to process his own cane and that of neighbouring farms.

In 1881 the Buderim Mountain Sugar Mill was established and also served many small farms, but both mills had failed by the end of the decade. In 1893 the Sugar Works Guarantee Act was passed. This provided capital for the erection of central sugar mills in districts with many small farms by offering loans to incorporated companies, so that growers could develop their own mills. The Moreton Central Sugar Mill Company was formed in December 1894. Land bounded by the North Coast railway line on the west and Gympie Road on the east was purchased for a mill site at the small settlement of Nambour. Erection of a mill by Caskie and Thompson began in late 1895.

In order for the mill to be successful, it was essential to establish an efficient means for bringing the harvested cane in from surrounding farms to be crushed. Tramway networks carrying wagons drawn by steam locomotives had been used effectively in other Queensland sugar districts since the 1880s, so possible routes for a tramway network were surveyed as part of the planning for the Moreton Mill. A two-foot gauge was chosen for the sake of economy, speed not being an important factor in the running of the tramway, though the wagons were at first pulled by horses. In 1897 the first tramlines were constructed east to Perrin's Barn and west to the foot of the Perwillowen Range and the first harvest was crushed at the mill.

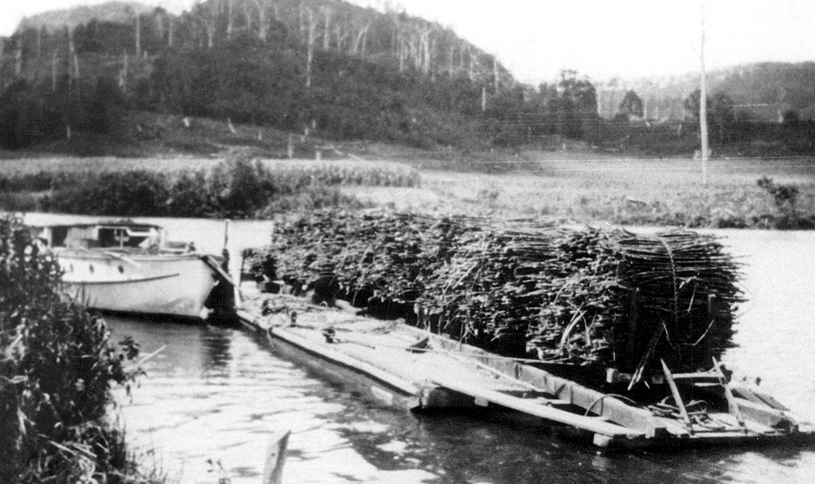
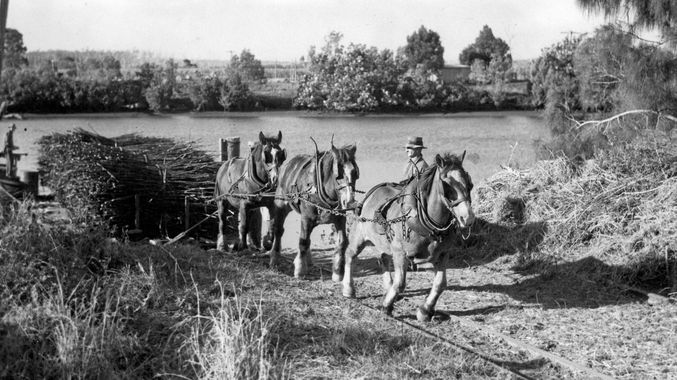
Cane punts delivered loaded cane trucks across the Maroochy River until the David Low Bridge was built in 1959

Establishing tramways proved expensive due to the nature of the terrain and there were consequent difficulties with the supply of cane to the mill, though by 1905, there were 26 miles (42 km) of permanent tramline in use. As mortgagee, the Queensland government took over the running of the mill between 1904 and 1907. The first locomotive, a Krauss 0-6-0 tank locomotive, was purchased in 1905 although horses were still used to deliver cane to the end of the western line and over a tramline which ran over the Rosemount Range and connected with the Petrie Creek line to the east of the mill. In 1911 a branch line was constructed to the Maroochy River and although the eastern section of the tramway network continued to be extended, lines on the western side were sold to Maroochy Shire in 1914. Some branch lines were dismantled and the line extended to Mapleton. The council operated this line for 30 years, before it was reacquired in 1945 by the Mill and reduced back to the foot of the range before being closed in 1970.

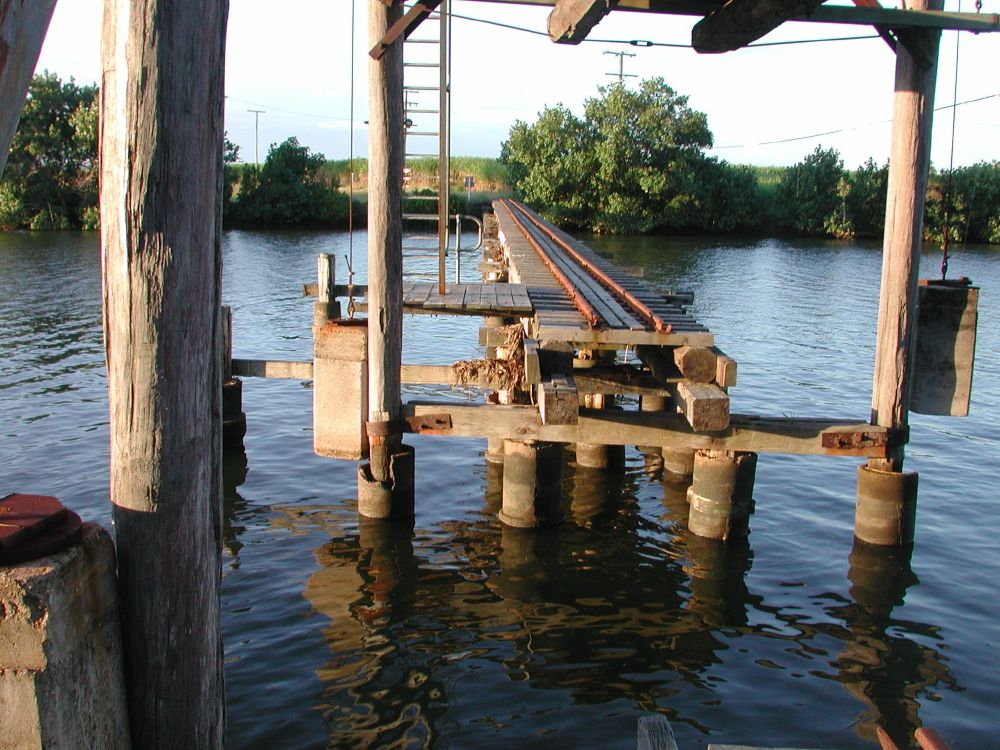
Tramway Lift Bridge over Maroochy River

Two short sections of line to the north were built, but a shortage of steel and labour during and after WWI caused problems with expansion. Much of the line was temporary, being laid down for the crushing season. In 1917 a lift up bridge was constructed over Petrie Creek and in 1921 the Tramway Lift Bridge over Maroochy River linking the northern cane growing areas to the tramway system. It was extended to connect with an isolated line built in 1922 between Coolum Creek and Coolum Beach. This line officially opened in 1923, though it had been in use for some time before this and was also used for the transport of passengers.

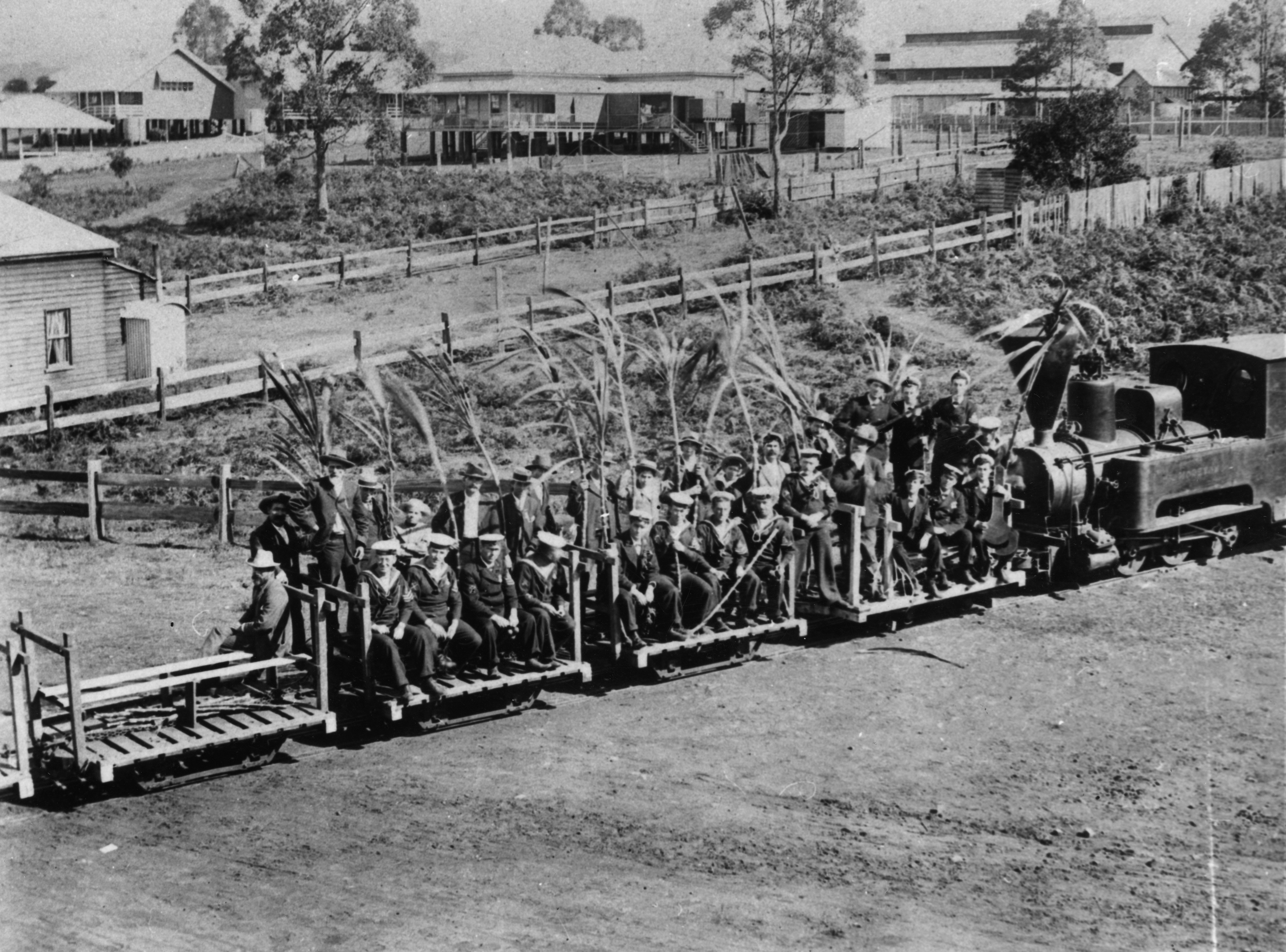
British sailors on board a cane train at Nambour Queensland, ca. 1910

Although there had been a wharf there since 1911, the road to Coolum was poor and often boggy, making the place hard to access. The tramway terminus at the mill in Nambour was very close to the train station and passengers from Brisbane could use the tramway to either link with the launch to Maroochydore or to travel to Coolum. The mill fitted up the cane wagons with back-to-back seats and timed the movement of trams to fit in with train timetables. This service was very popular and played an important role in the development of Coolum as a seaside resort. Land in the Mt Coolum Beach Estate went to auction the month after the tramway from Nambour was officially opened on 22 November 1923. In 1927 the Main Roads Department built a more serviceable road and the tramway passenger service continued to run to Deepwater until 1927 and to Coolum until 1935 when a bus service was provided.

Work on the mill and the tramway network continued through the 1930s, though during World War II operations at the mill fell because shipping was disrupted and there were labour shortages. After the war, the tramlines west of Nambour, bought by Maroochy Shire in 1914, ceased running and the mill purchased the line and locos. In 1951–2 an extensive program of repairs and line relaying was carried out. In 1961 diesel locomotives were purchased which necessitated strengthening bridges and laying heavier rail along the tramways.

Until 2003, when the mill closed, during the harvesting season, wire cane bins were towed through Nambour, entering the mill via a gate on Mill Street after passing in front of the cane inspector's and engineer's cottages. These bins entered the "full yard" from where they were progressed by hydraulic pushers into a tippler machine to discharge their cargo before returning to the fields.

In 1976 the mill was taken over by Howard Smith and major upgrades were carried out. In 1987, Howard Smith decided to return to its core business and the mill was sold to Bundaberg Sugar who was expanding by buying more mills. In 1989 the rail line to CSR in Brisbane closed at the Brisbane end and so road transport to the refinery was used. However, the trams continued to transport cane from farms to the mill.

The name of the company was changed to the Moreton Sugar Company Limited in 1991 and. the British company of Tate and Lyle acquired the mill as a wholly owned subsidiary when it took over Bundaberg Sugar in 1991. The plant and tramways were overhauled in 1997. Bundaberg Sugar, including seven mills, was sold to the Belgian company Finasucre in 2000.

Between 1980 and 2003 more than 1,000 hectares (2,500 acres) of cane land in Maroochy Shire were lost to urban development and other uses. This meant that some cane was being brought to the mill from 60–70 kilometres (37–43 mi) away. As it is very important that cane is crushed soon after harvesting to maintain its sugar content, this had an adverse effect on the functioning of the mill. The price of sugar also fell and a crisis was reached in 2002. It was decided that Moreton Mill would close and its last crush took place on 3 December 2003. The majority of tramline was removed by Bundaberg Sugar as part of an agreement with landowners from whom the tramline corridor was leased. The section of line covered by this entry represents its use as a transport system for both cane and passengers and as an unusual feature of the Nambour for which the town is well known.

== Description ==
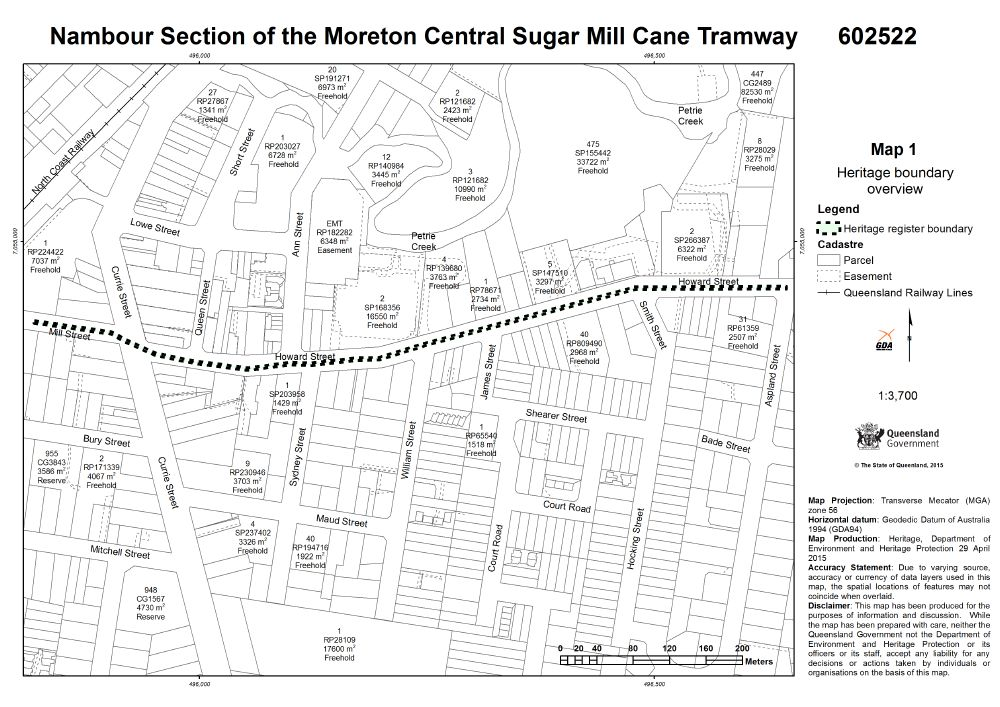
Map of the Nambour section of the Moreton Central Sugar Mill Cane Tramway

The cane tramway is laid directly into the centre of the roadway and runs through the central business district of Nambour. It is of a 2-foot (610 mm) gauge and travels between the road reserve in front of the former mill site in Mill Street, across the Currie Street intersection and down Howard Street to the marshalling yards.

== Heritage listing ==
The Nambour Section of the Moreton Central Sugar Mill Cane Tramway was listed on the Queensland Heritage Register on 7 February 2005 having satisfied the following criteria.

The place is important in demonstrating the evolution or pattern of Queensland's history.

The Moreton Central Sugar Mill operated between 1897 and December 2003. During the 20th century, sugar growing was the most important primary industry in the Maroochy district. It was a key factor in the development of Nambour and the Maroochy Shire and important in the growth of the sugar industry in Queensland. The cane tramway, which brought cane from many farms to the mill for crushing, was an essential part of the operation of the mill. The line between Nambour and Coolum was also used for passengers in the 1920s and 30s and was instrumental in the development of the tourist industry in the area, by linking the QR station next to the Nambour mill with resort areas at Coolum and Maroochydore.

The place demonstrates rare, uncommon or endangered aspects of Queensland's cultural heritage.

Although it is very uncommon for a cane tramway to pass through the centre of a town, as the line at Nambour does, the line otherwise demonstrates the features of its type well, being a narrow gauge (2 feet (0.61 m)) track laid without formation and links the site of the mill to the marshalling yards from where it fanned out in many separate lines forming a large network across farms, roadways and over the Maroochy River.

The place is important in demonstrating the principal characteristics of a particular class of cultural places.

Although it is very uncommon for a cane tramway to pass through the centre of a town, as the line at Nambour does, the line otherwise demonstrates the features of its type well, being a narrow gauge (2 feet (0.61 m)) track laid without formation and links the site of the mill to the marshalling yards from where it fanned out in many separate lines forming a large network across farms, roadways and over the Maroochy River.

The place has a strong or special association with a particular community or cultural group for social, cultural or spiritual reasons.

The section of the tramway that passes through the town is an important characteristic of Nambour. Laden cane trains travelling between Nambour's shops and commercial buildings featured on many post card views of the town; the sight was popular with tourists and was a part of annual cane harvest festivals until very recently.

== See also ==
- List of tramways in Queensland
