= Moreton Central Sugar Mill =

Former sugar mill facility in Queensland

- Alternative names: Moreton Mill
- Current status: Closed
- Location: Nambour, Queensland Australia
- Owner: Bundaberg Sugar Ltd
- Further ownership: Finasucre Group (2000)
- Coordinates: 26.6275°S 152.9572°E

Construction
- Built: 1897
- Demolished: 2006

Moreton Central Sugar Mill was a sugar milling facility in Nambour, Queensland, Australia owned by Bundaberg Sugar Ltd.

== Sugar cane in Australia ==
Sugar cane was first brought to Australia in 1788, but subsequent plantings at Sydney, Port Macquarie and Norfolk Island failed to be commercially viable. Captain Louis Hope grew a cane crop successfully in Queensland in 1862. By 1864 the first commercial sugar mill in Australia had been established by him at Ormiston and interest in growing sugar cane spread rapidly, encouraged by the Queensland Government. By 1867 an estimated 2000 acres were under cane in the Brisbane area and by the end of the decade, cane had also been successfully established further north at Maryborough, Mackay and Bundaberg, where the warmer climate proved more suitable.

== History ==
William Clark had experimented with sugar cane growing at Bli Bli in the 1860s, but in 1869 a group of Quakers took up land near the junction of the Mooloolah River and Sippy Creek, planted sugar cane and erected a crushing mill. This project was abandoned after severe flooding in the 1870s, but cane was grown successfully in other parts of the district including Buderim, where in 1876 Joseph Chapman Dixon, one of the Mooloolah growers, established a mill in order to process his own cane and that of neighbouring farms.

In 1881 the Buderim Mountain Sugar Mill was established and also served many small farms, but both mills had failed by the end of the decade. In 1893, the Sugar Works Guarantee Act was passed. This provided capital for the erection of central sugar mills in districts with many small farms by offering loans to incorporated companies, so that growers could develop their own mills. The Moreton Central Sugar Mill Company was formed in December 1894. Land bounded by the North Coast railway line on the west and Gympie Road on the east was purchased for a mill site at the small settlement of Nambour. Erection of a mill by Caskie and Thompson began in late 1895.

In order for the mill to be successful, it was essential to establish an efficient means for bringing the harvested cane in from surrounding farms to be crushed. Tramway networks carrying wagons drawn by steam locomotives had been used effectively in other Queensland sugar districts since the 1880s, so possible routes for a tramway network were surveyed as part of the planning for the Moreton Mill. A two-foot (610mm) gauge was chosen for the sake of economy, speed not being an important factor in the running of the tramway, though the wagons were at first pulled by horses. In 1897 the first tramlines were constructed east to Perrin's Barn and west to the foot of the Perwillowen Range and the first harvest was crushed at the mill.

=== Closure ===
The Moreton Central Sugar Mill ended crushing operations in late 2003 and was demolished in 2006. Prior to the mill's closure, Finasucre (Belgium) bought Bundaberg Sugar Ltd.

Between 1980 and 2003 more than 1,000 hectares of cane land in Maroochy Shire were lost to urban development and other uses. This meant that some cane was being brought to the mill from 60 or 70 kilometres away. As it is important that cane is crushed soon after harvesting to maintain its sugar content, this had an adverse effect on the functioning of the mill. The price of sugar also fell and a crisis was reached in 2002. It was decided that Moreton Mill would close. Its last crush took place on 3 December 2003. The majority of the tramlines were removed by Bundaberg Sugar as part of an agreement with landowners from whom the tramline corridor was leased. The section of line covered by this entry represents its use as a transport system for both cane and passengers and as an unusual feature of the Nambour.

The former Moreton Mill Site was purchased by Coles who have developed a multi-storey shopping complex trading under the title 'Nambour Mill Village'.

== Railway ==
The main cane tramway is laid directly into the centre of the roadway and runs through the central business district of Nambour. It is of a 2-foot (610 mm) gauge and travels between the road reserve in front of the former mill site in Mill Street, across the Currie Street intersection and down Howard Street to the marshalling yards where it continues to other parts of the region. After the mill's closure the majority of the rail network was removed and locomotives were auctioned or donated to the Nambour & District Historical Museum Association.

Steam locomotives were utilised at the mill until the 1980s but at the same time were also operating Diesel and V8 petrol locomotives. The former Howard Street Marshalling Yards were purchased by Aldi Supermarkets who have developed an Aldi Supermarket on the location.

== Cane Farming ==
The mill's tramway network connected the many farms to the mill, ensuring quick transportation. The farms stretched from the Nambour region to areas near Coolum Beach, Valdora and Noosa. By 1967, when the Sunshine Coast was officially named, the mill's tramway was 70 miles long, as it required to receive the maximum amount of local sugar.

== See also ==
- List of sugar mills in Queensland
- Moreton Central Sugar Mill Cane Tramway
- Moreton Central Sugar Mill Worker's Housing
- List of tramways in Queensland
