= Racecourse Mill =

Sugar mill located in Queensland, Australia

Coordinates: 21.1640°S 149.1348°E

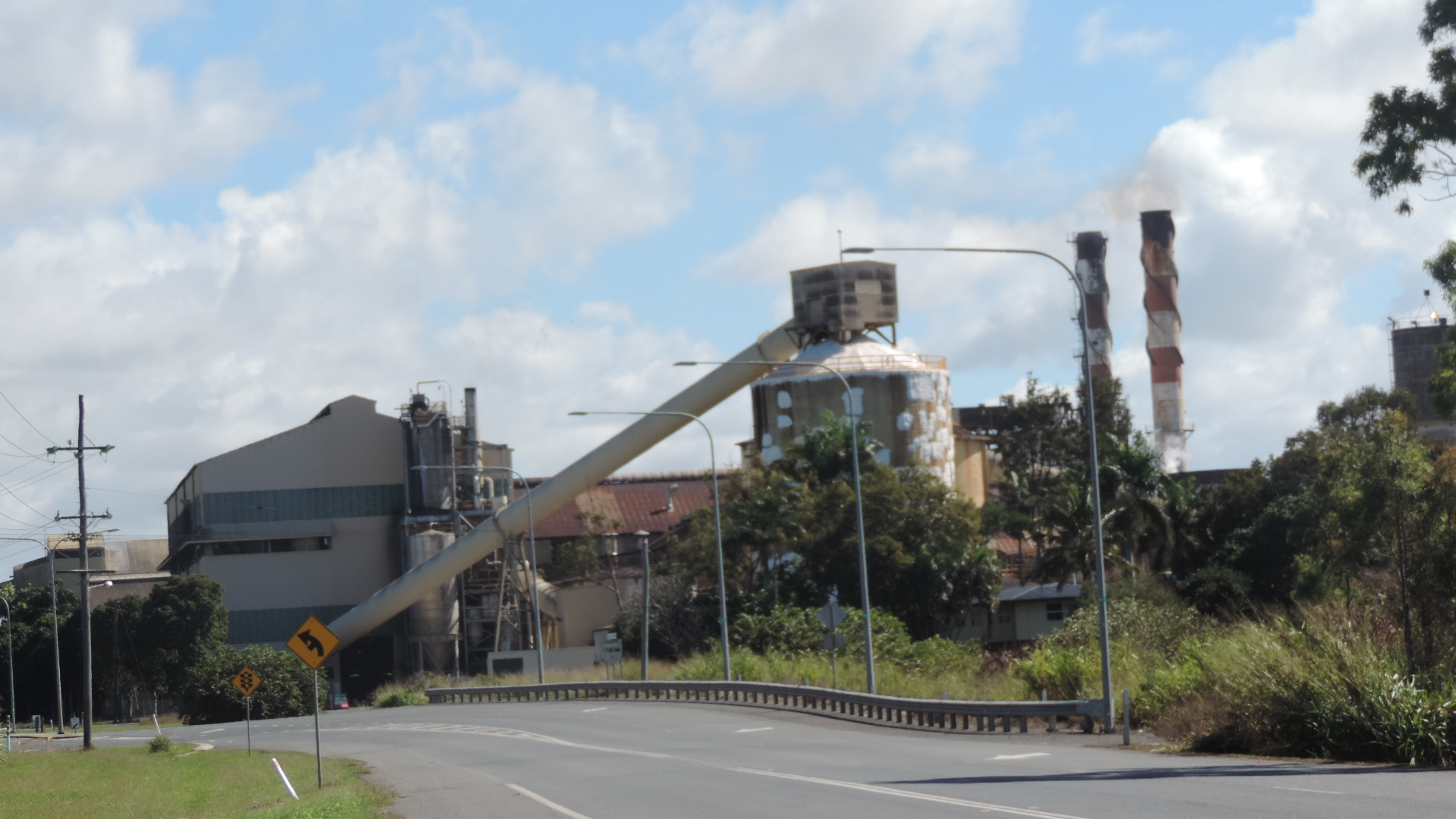
Racecourse sugar mill, 2016

The Racecourse Mill is a sugar mill located in Racecourse, Mackay, Queensland and is one of the largest sugar refineries in Australia. Other sugar cane mills located in the Mackay Region include; Marian Sugar Mill, Pleystowe Sugar Mill, Farleigh Mill and Plane Creek Mill at Sarina. Pleystowe Mill was the oldest surviving mill in the district but closed in 2008.

== History ==
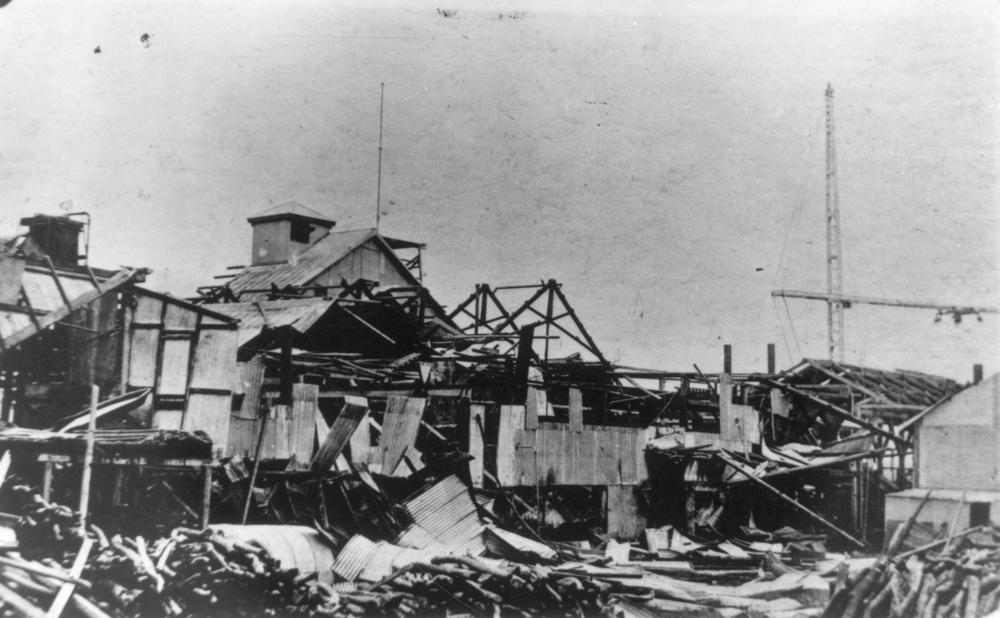
Cyclone damage, 1918

Racecourse Mill began operations in 1888. The refinery was severely damaged during the 1918 Mackay cyclone.

== Current production ==
External videos
- Racecourse Mill sugar cane trains

The amount of sugar produced at Racecourse Mill is about 1.7 million tonnes per year. Today, Marian, Racecourse and Farleigh are one of the largest sugar refineries in Australia. Plane Creek Mill is one of the oldest mills in the district, located in Sarina, Queensland. It has been announced that The Marian Sugar Mill is the largest sugar mill in Queensland, with crushing at the most and full throttle 3.65 crushing per year, making it the largest sugar refinery in Australia as well.

Bagasse is burned to produce electricity at the mill.

== See also ==
- List of sugar mills in Queensland
- Agriculture in Australia
- Economy of Queensland
- List of tramways in Queensland
