= Glazed architectural terra-cotta =

Coated fired clay used to decorate buildings

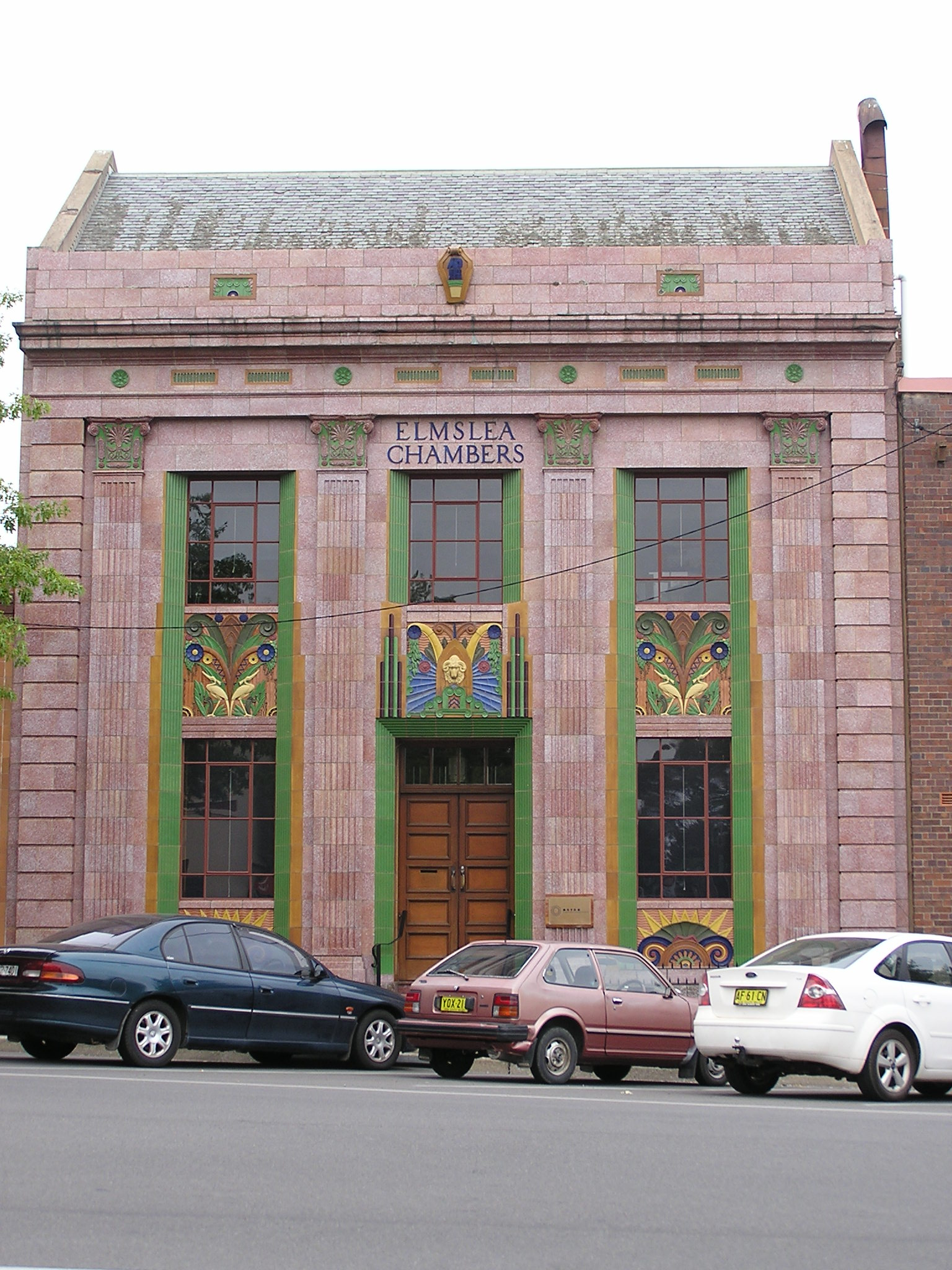
Elmslea Chambers in Goulburn, New South Wales, Australia – built in 1933, it was one of the first buildings in Australia to use coloured polychrome terracotta in its façade which features a fine relief of birds, flowers, leaves and typical Art Deco sunbursts under the windows.

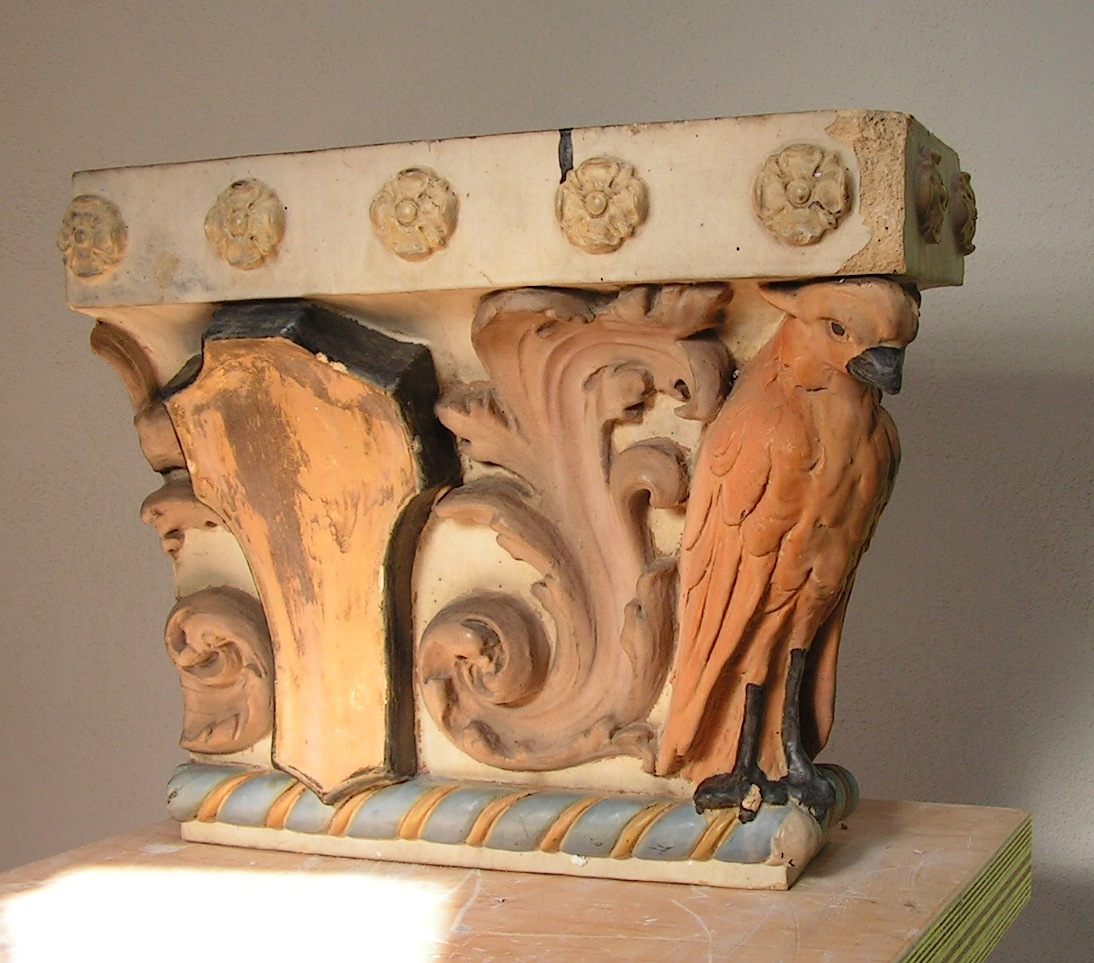
Polychrome glazed capital, circa 1915. Randalls Lost NYC collection

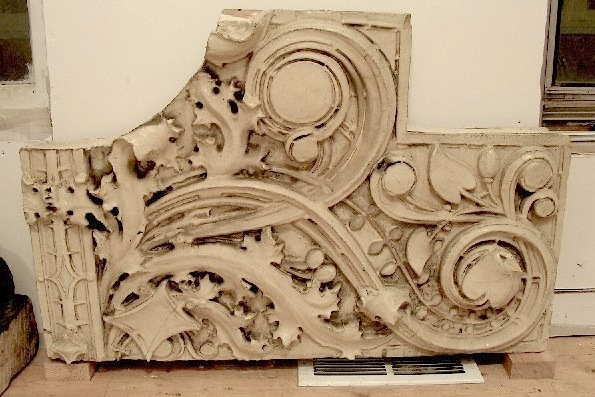
White glazed Sullivanesque, circa 1925. Randalls Lost NYC collection

Glazed architectural terra cotta is a ceramic masonry building material used as a decorative skin. It was featured widely in the 'terracotta revival' from the 1880s until the 1930s.

It was used in the UK, United States, Canada and Australia and is still one of the most common building materials found in U.S. urban environments. It is the glazed version of architectural terracotta; the material in both its glazed and unglazed versions is sturdy and relatively inexpensive, and can be molded into richly ornamented detail. Glazed terra-cotta played a significant role in architectural styles such as the Chicago School and Beaux-Arts architecture.

== History ==
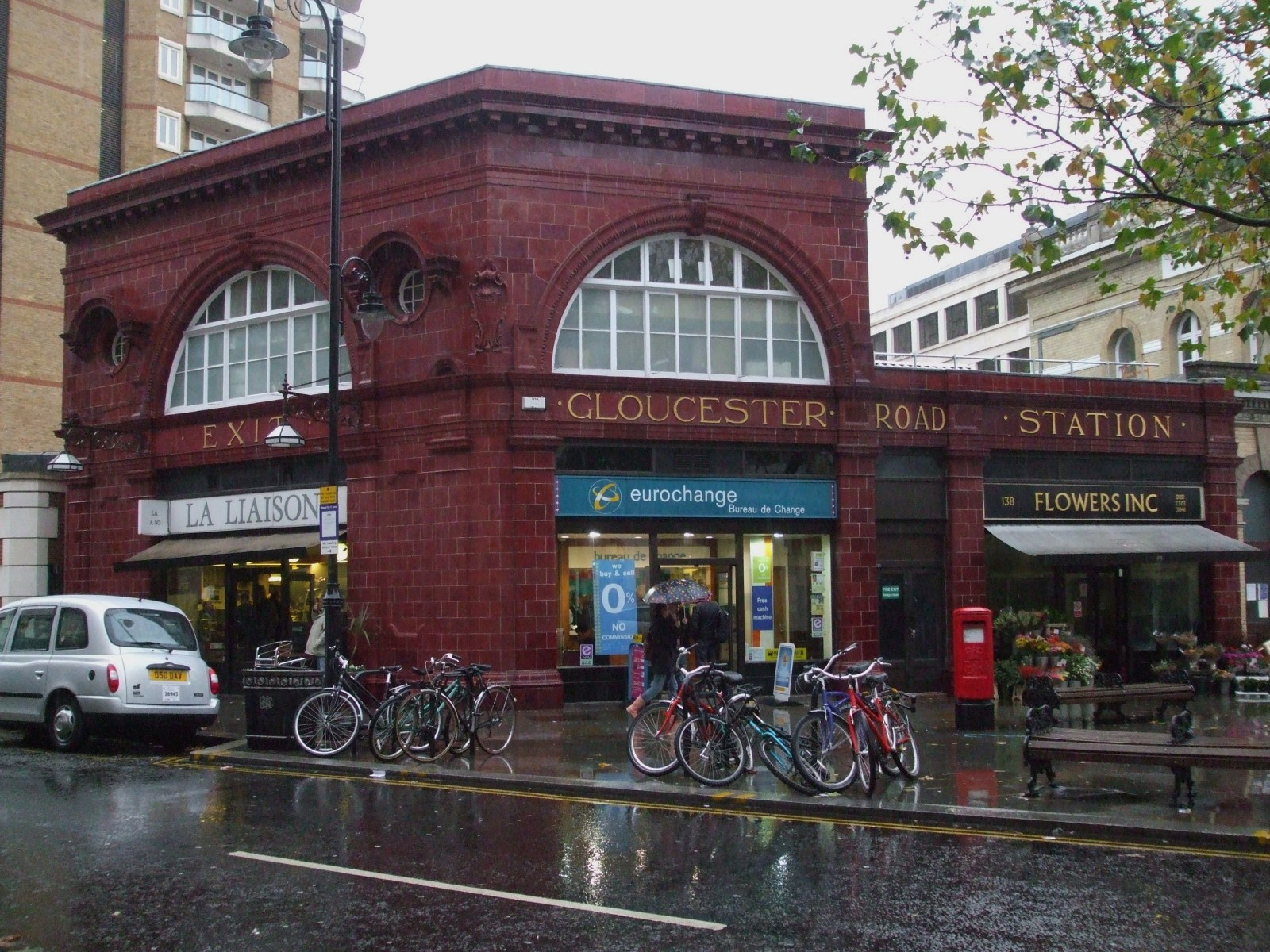
Gloucester Road station, Piccadilly line, with the sang de boeuf glazed tiles used on many London Underground station buildings.

The material, also known in Great Britain as faience and sometimes referred to as "architectural ceramics" in the USA was closely associated with the work of Cass Gilbert, Louis Sullivan, and Daniel H. Burnham, among other architects. Buildings incorporating glazed terra-cotta include the Woolworth Building in New York City and the Wrigley Building in Chicago.

Glazed architectural terra-cotta offered a modular, varied and relatively inexpensive approach to wall and floor construction. It was particularly adaptable to vigorous and rich ornamental detailing. It was created by Luca della Robbia (1400–1482), and was used in most of his works.

Terra-cotta is an enriched molded clay brick or block. It was usually hollow cast in blocks which were open in the back, with internal stiffeners called webbing, substantially strengthening the hollow blocks with minimal weight increase. The blocks were finished with a glaze, with a clay wash or an aqueous solution of metal salts, before firing.

Late 19th-century advertising for the material promoted the durable, impervious and adaptable nature of glazed architectural terra-cotta. It could accommodate subtle nuances of modeling, texture and color. Compared with stone, it was easier to handle, quickly set and lower cost. The cost of producing the blocks, when compared to carving stone, was a considerable saving, especially when casts were used in a modular fashion—that is, used repeatedly. It never needed paint, and periodic washings restored its appearance.

== Usage ==
Variations in the color and pattern of the glaze could make it look like granite or limestone; this flexibility helped make it attractive for architects.

Four major types of terra-cotta were widely used

1. Brownstone was the earliest type. A dark red or brown block which was not necessarily glazed, it was used as imitation sandstone, brick or with real brownstone and associated with the architectural styles of Richard Upjohn, James Renwick Jr., H. H. Richardson.
2. Fireproof was developed as a direct result of the growth of the high rise building in America. Cheap, light and fireproof, the rough-finished hollow blocks were ideally suited to span the I-beam members in floor, wall and ceiling construction. Certain varieties are still in production today.
3. Veneer was developed during the 1930s and is still used today. Unlike traditional architectural terra-cotta, ceramic veneer is not hollow cast. It is a veneer of glazed ceramic tile which is ribbed on the back like bathroom tile and usually attached to a grid of metal ties which have been anchored to the building.
4. Glazed architectural terra-cotta was the most complex building material developed. The hollow units were hand cast in molds or carved in clay and heavily glazed, then fired. This is the terra-cotta associated with the architecture of Cass Gilbert, Louis Sullivan and Daniel H. Burnham.

=== Use in the United States ===
The American Terra Cotta Corporation, founded in 1881, operated for eighty-five years in the little town of Terra Cotta in the heart of Illinois dairy country (near Crystal Lake, Illinois). The company fabricated architectural terra cotta for more than 8,000 buildings throughout the U.S. and Canada. It was the last exclusive manufacturer of architectural terra cotta by the time it ceased production in 1966. From its founding, in time to rebuild the fire-ravished city of Chicago, until its closing, it was the major producer of architectural glazed terra cotta in North America.

Guastavino tile was used in many places, including the Bridgemarket under the Manhattan side of the Queensboro Bridge.

Illinois examples

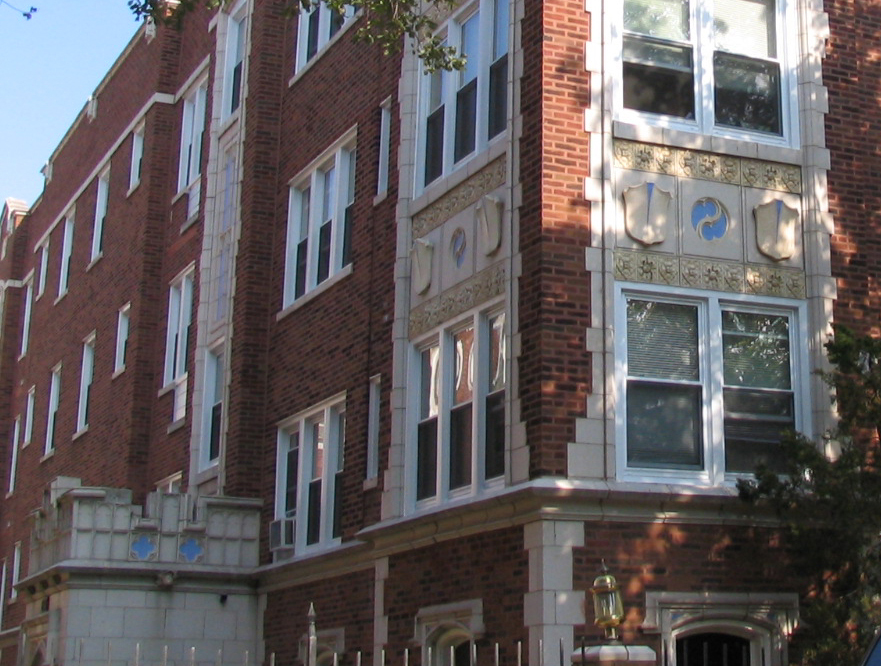
6715-6725 S. Paxton Ave., c. 1925, Chicago, IL

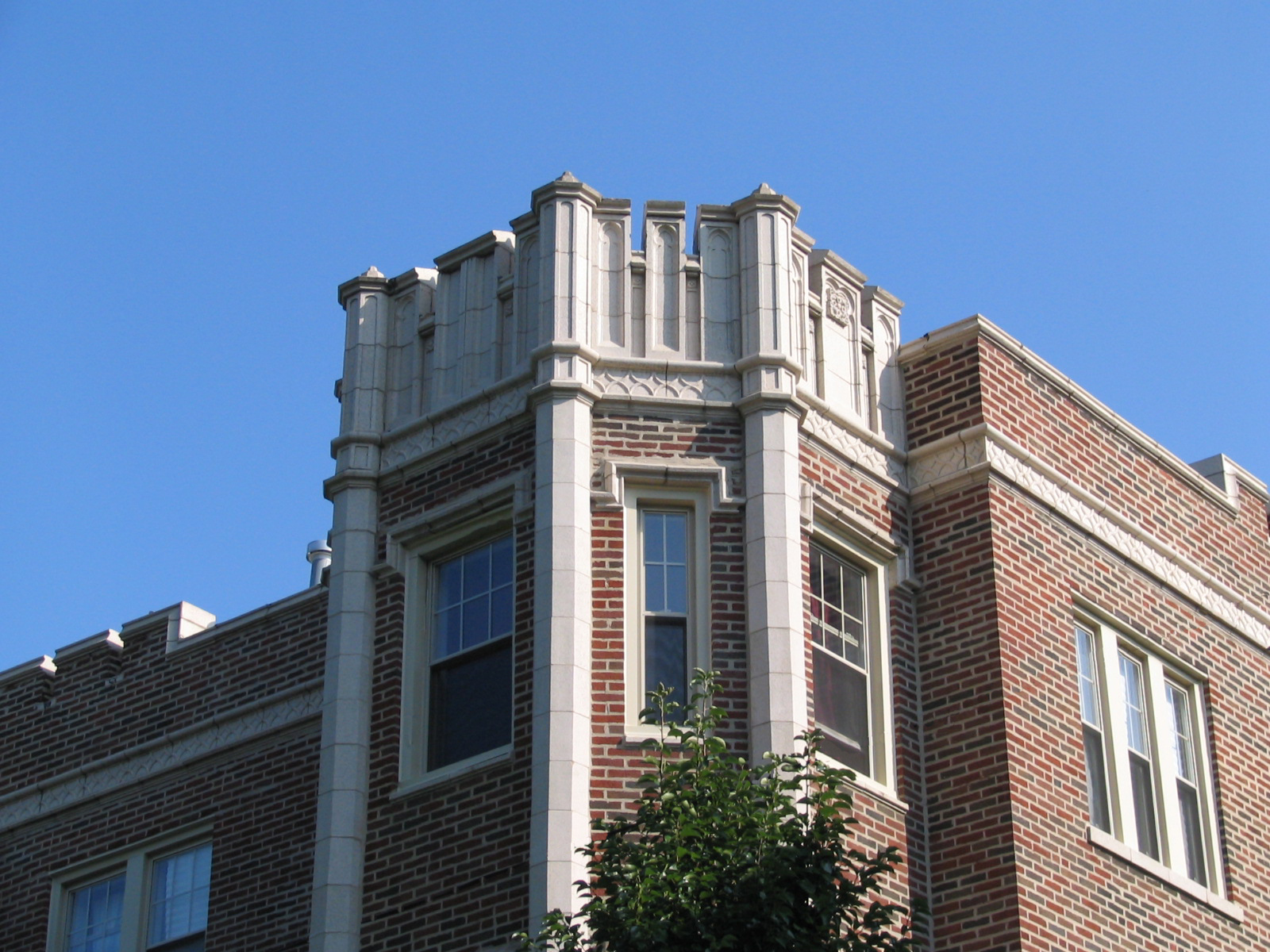
2301-2347 E. 70th Pl., c. 1925, Chicago, IL

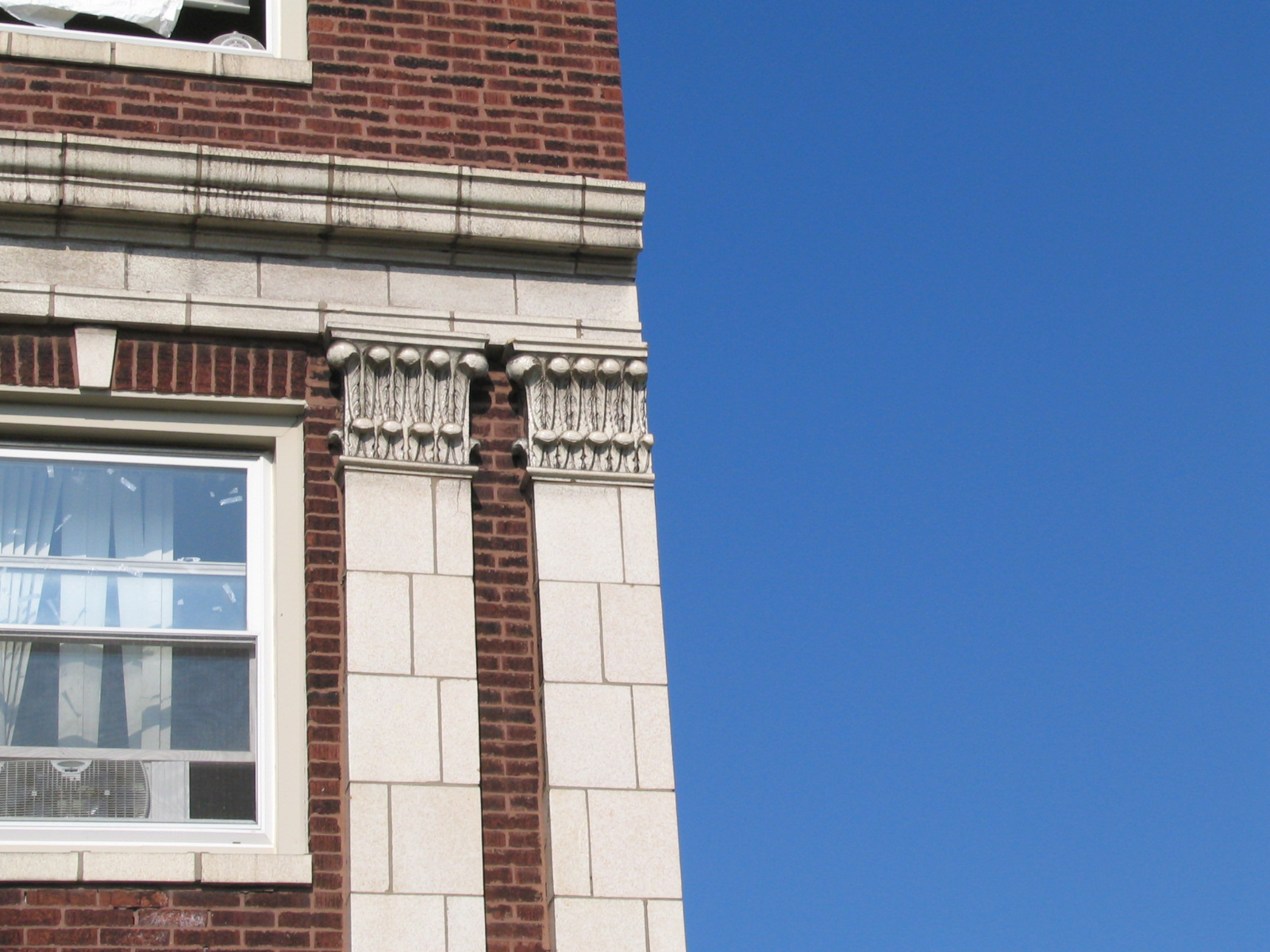
7247-51 S. Phillips Ave., c. 1925, Chicago, IL

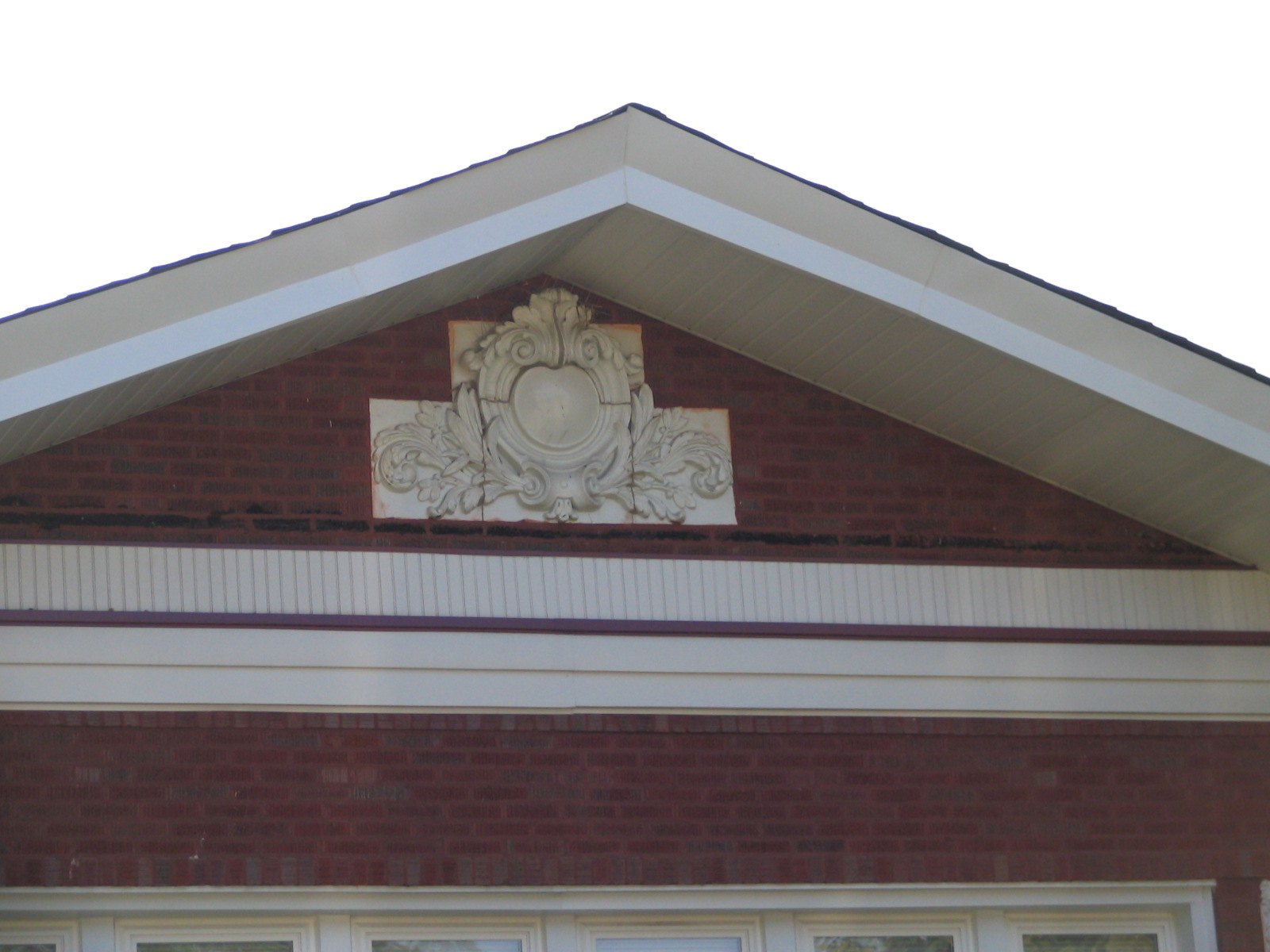
7936 S. Luella Ave., c. 1925, Chicago, IL

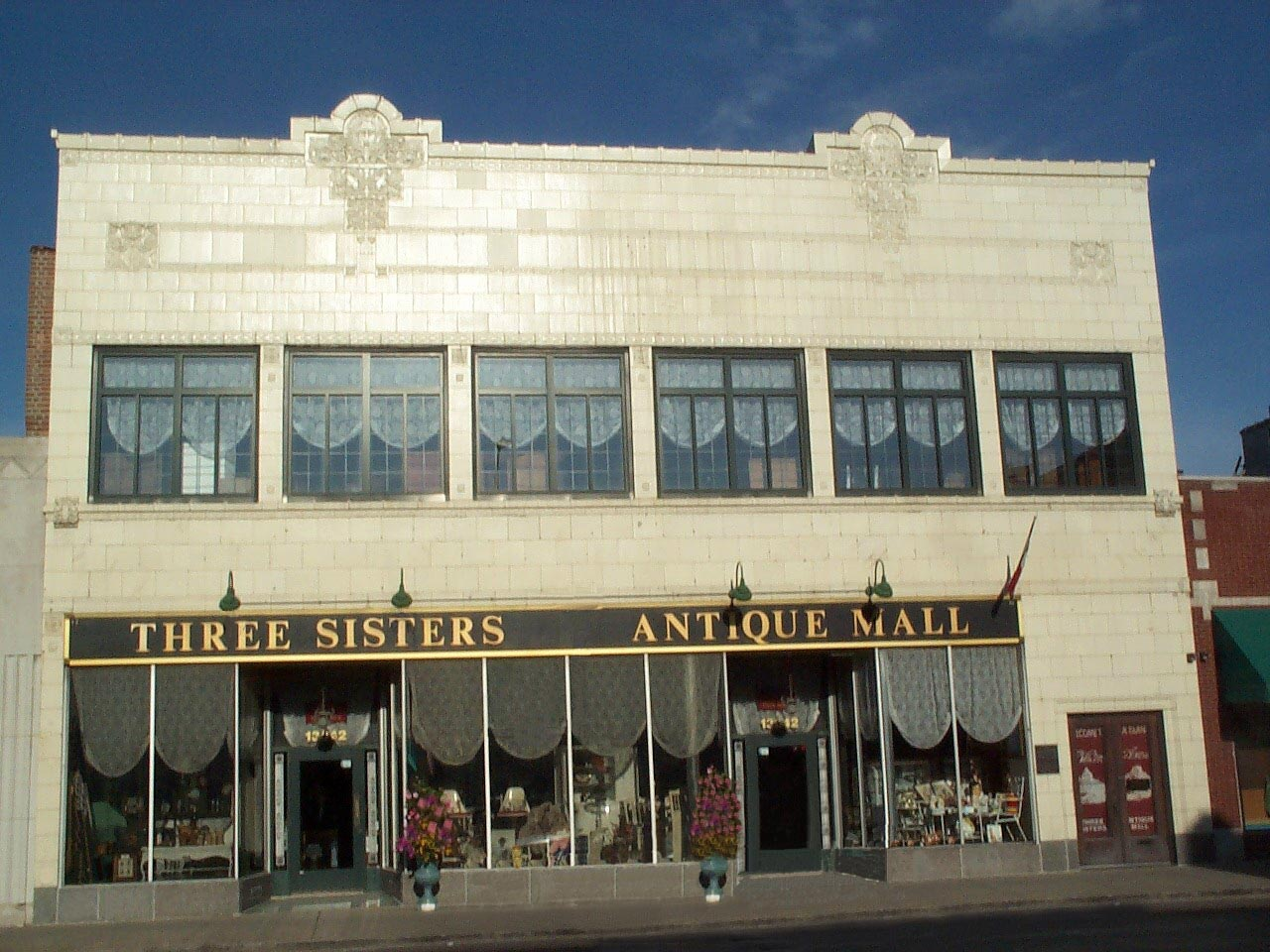
13042 S. Western Ave., The Woolworth Building, for Teresa Klein, 1915, Blue Island, IL

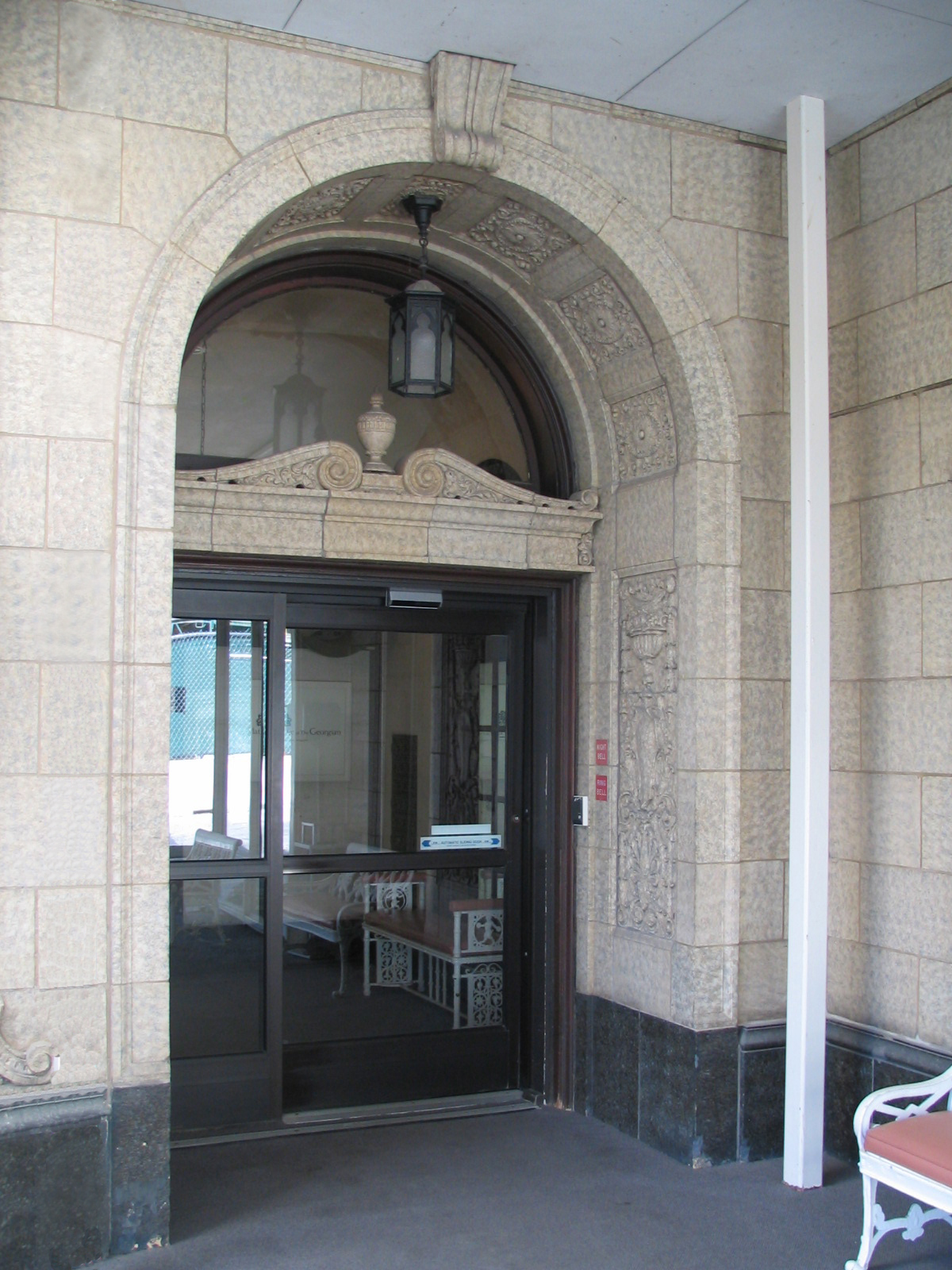
422 Davis St., Evanston, IL. 1926, Main entrance, the Georgian Hotel

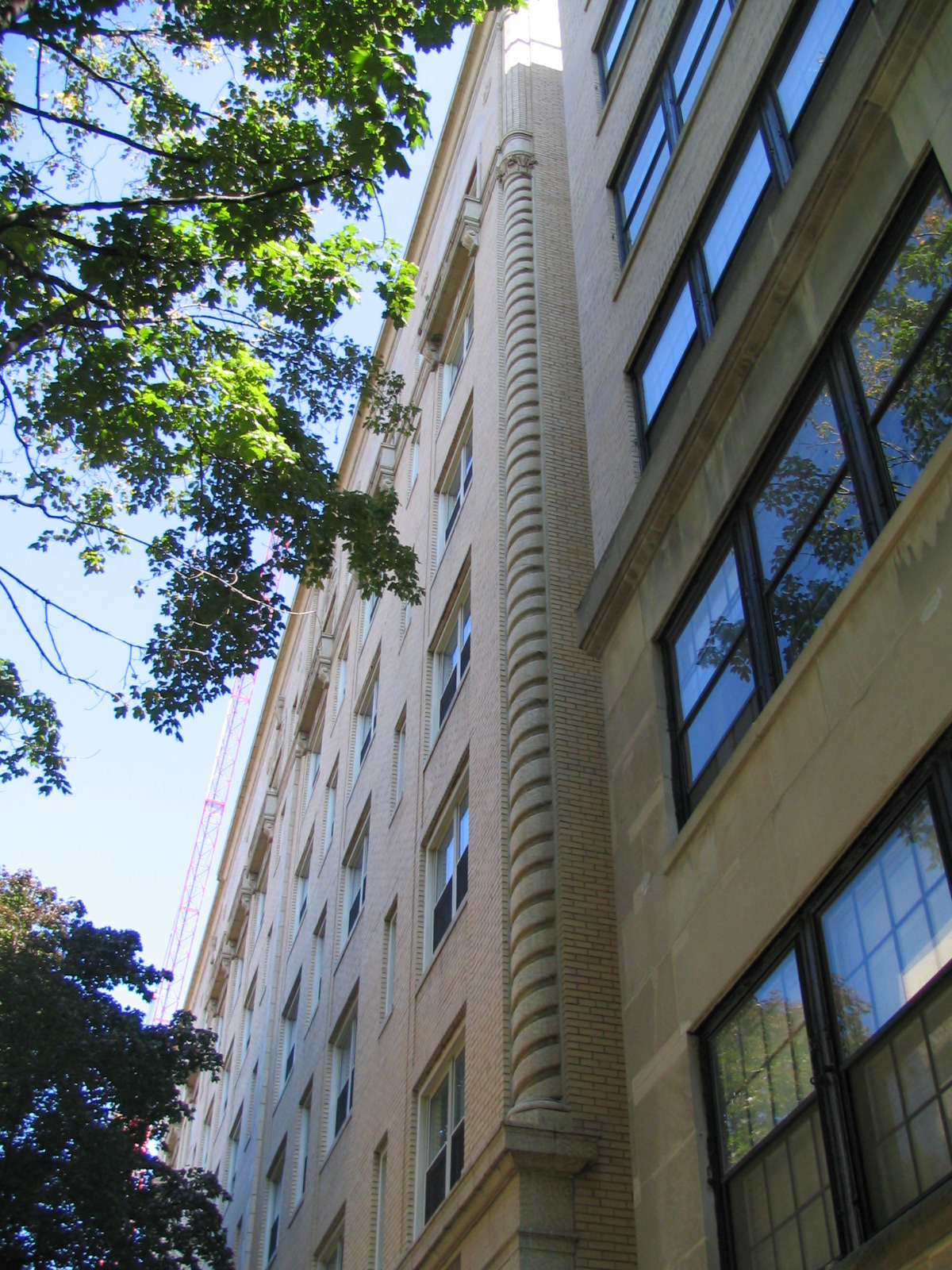
422 Davis St., Evanston, IL. 1926, Corner detail, the Georgian Hotel

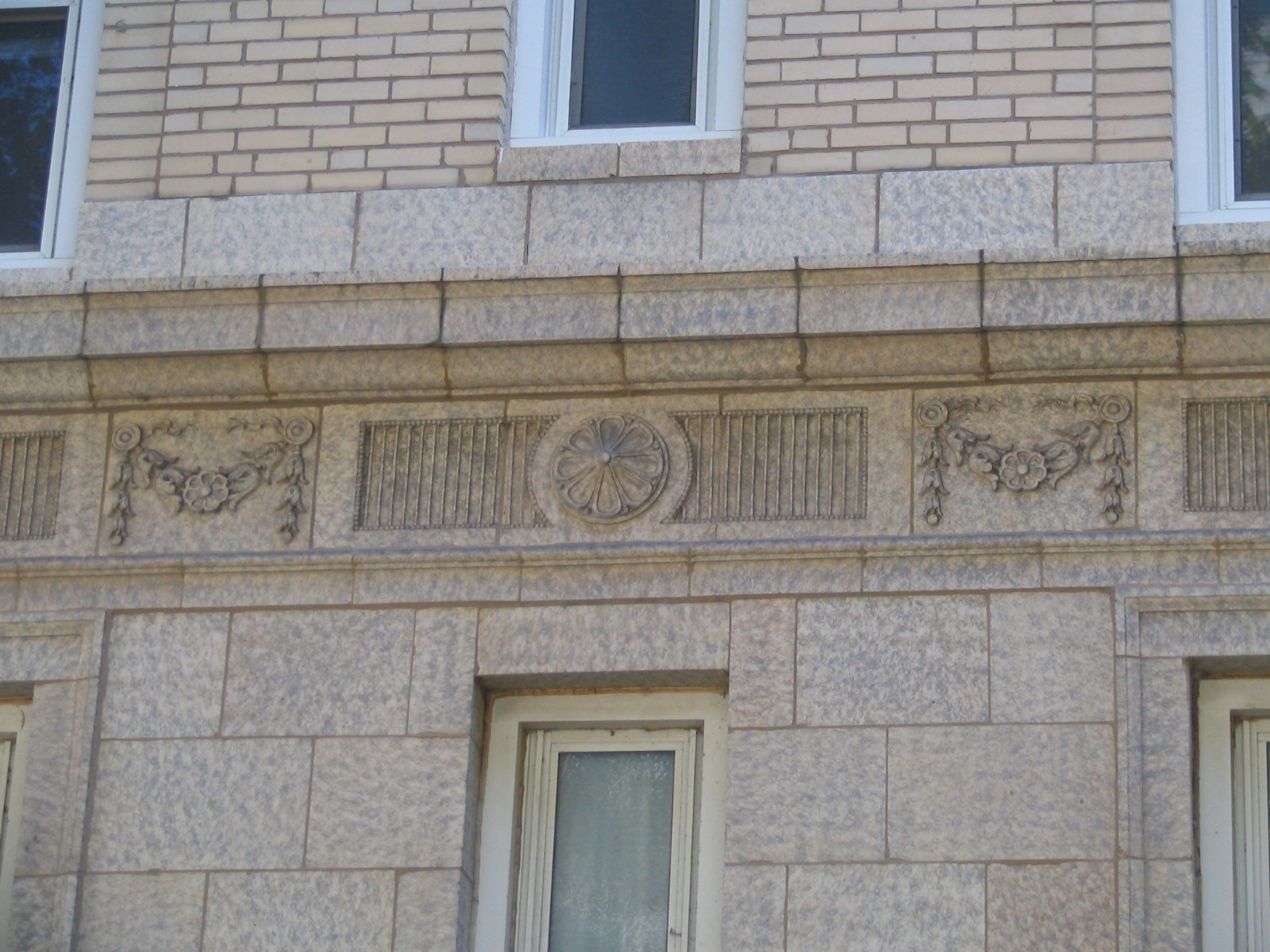
422 Davis St., Evanston, IL. 1926, Cornice detail, the Georgian Hotel

=== Use in Canada ===
Although glazed terra-cotta was much more common in the US, it was used in central Canada starting around 1900, on many of the area's first skyscrapers. The glazed terra-cotta used in central Canada was usually imported from the US or England.

=== Use in Great Britain ===
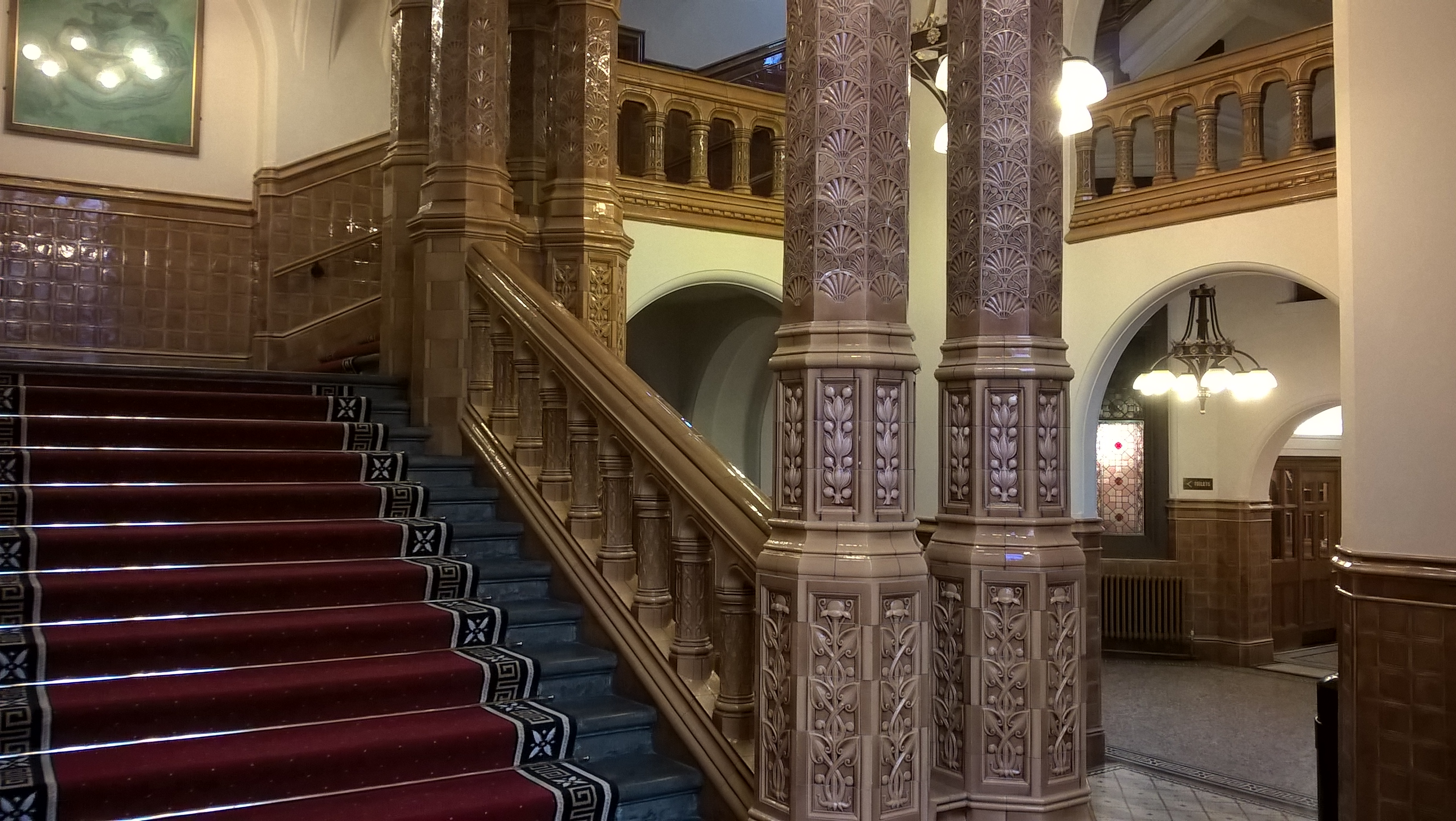
Burmantofts faience in the Great Hall of the University of Leeds

From around 1880 unglazed terra-cotta was supplanted by the glazed version – faience, and glazed brick – which were easily cleaned, and not blackened by city smoke. A prominent producer was Burmantofts Pottery in Leeds, which also exported to Paris and Montreal.

=== Use in Australia ===
Faience was popularised in Melbourne in the 1920s by architects such as Harry Norris. One of the leading commercial architects of the time in the city, Norris was strongly influenced by trends in American architecture and used faience on projects such as the Nicholas Building and the Kellow Falkiner Showrooms (a 1928 car showroom) in South Yarra. In Sydney, it featured on notable buildings such as BMA House, designed by Joseph Charles Fowell. Australian-made tiles were available from Wunderlich Tiles, a company founded by London-born Frederick Wunderlich.

== See also ==
- Gladding, McBean
- Guastavino tile
- Tile Heritage Foundation

== External links and sources ==
- National Park Service.gov: The Preservation of Historic Glazed Architectural Terra-Cotta
- Heritage Ottawa.org: "Ottawa's Former Bowles Lunch" (January 2002 article)
- Graciano.com: Renovation of Bridgemarket under the Queensboro Bridge — project architect's website.
- Harvard Graduate School of Design.edu: Ceramics Research
- Randalls Urban Sculptures — photos of architectural terra cotta and gargoyles from demolished buildings.
