= Frederick Otto Wunderlich =

Frederick Otto Wunderlich (28 June 1861 – 12 May 1951), known as Otto, along with his two brothers, Alfred and Ernest created the well known Wunderlich brand of building products in early 20th century Australia, based in Sydney.

Wunderlich was best known as a manufacturer of pressed metal, used to create decorative domestic and commercial ceilings and dados, and of the red ‘Marseilles’ patterned roof tile, a ubiquitous and defining characteristic of the Federation house. The company also manufactured Faience, and asbestos cement pipes, as well as roof tiles and wall sheets, inexpensive and popular material for houses in Australia from the 1920s into the 1950s.

Like his brothers, Otto was born in Islington, London, to English-born Charles Frederick Wunderlich and Fulda-born Caroline nee Schmedes, and was educated in London, Germany and Switzerland. He studied medicine in Lucerne and London, where he practiced as a doctor in the 1890s. In 1900, he moved to Australia to join his brothers, where he reorganised the company on more efficient lines, and introduced a range of benefits for their employees, creating a loyal workforce.

== See also ==
- William Baillieu
- Theodore Fink
- George Percy Grainger
- Joseph Bradley
- William Arundel Orchard
- George Rayner Hoff
- Sir John Frederick Neville Cardus
- Sir William Dobell
