= First World War Honour Board, National Australia Bank (308 Queen Street) =

Heritage-listed war memorial in Brisbane, Queensland

First World War Honour Board, Queensland National Bank
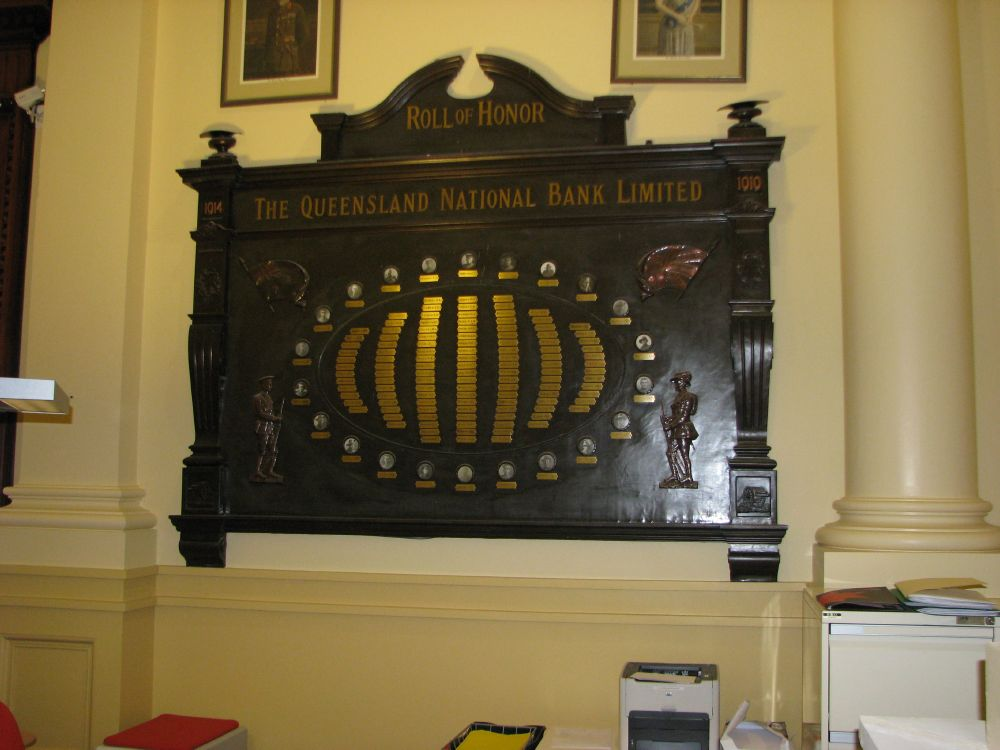
- First World War Honour Board, 2008

- Location within Queensland Location within Australia
- 27.467°S 153.0282°E
- Location: National Australia Bank, 308 Queen Street, Brisbane City, City of Brisbane, Queensland, Australia

Queensland Heritage Register
- Official name: First World War Honour Board
- Type: state heritage (built)
- Designated: 21 October 1992
- Reference no.: 600152
- Significant period: 1920 (fabric); 1920 (historical, social)

First World War Honour Board is a heritage-listed memorial at the National Australia Bank, 308 Queen Street, in the Brisbane central business district, City of Brisbane, Queensland, Australia. It was added to the Queensland Heritage Register on 21 October 1992.

== History ==
Of the 331,946 Australians who embarked for overseas service, nearly 60,000 did not survive the First World War. Memorials were commissioned by service organisations, shire or city councils and by business groups. Some commemorated those who had died, while others recorded all who had served in the armed forces during the war. This honour board was erected by the Queensland National Bank in commemoration of those employees who served during this War.

The Sydney firm of Wunderlich Ltd, suppliers of architectural metalwork, manufactured the board. Listed in an oval centrepiece are the names of 115 employees of the Queensland National Bank (now the National Australia Bank) who saw service during the war and returned. Around this are the photographs and names of 22 employees who died while on active service. The memorial was unveiled by George Edward Bunning, Chairman of the Queensland National Bank Board on 19 August 1920. It is located to one side of the main entrance of the banking chamber, matched by a less elaborate Wunderlich honour board commemorating service of the bank's employees during the Second World War.

== Description ==
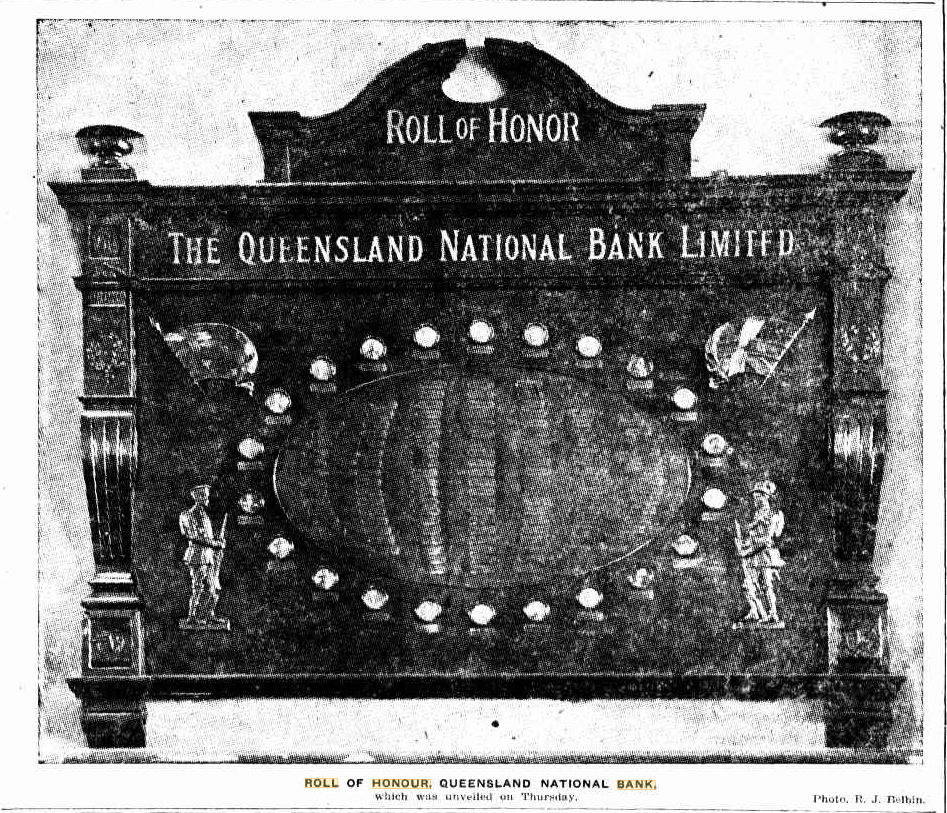
Roll of Honour, Queensland National Bank, Brisbane, August 1920

The honour board is a large bronze panel framed by mouldings and relief ornamentation, with lettering covering the pediment and frieze. In the upper corners of the panel are brass and enamelled representations of the Australian Commonwealth flag and of the Union Jack. In the lower corners are the brass bas relief figures of an Australian Infantryman and a Light Horseman.

== Heritage listing ==
First World War Honour Board was listed on the Queensland Heritage Register on 21 October 1992 having satisfied the following criteria.

The place is important in demonstrating the evolution or pattern of Queensland's history.

The Honour Board is important in demonstrating the evolution of Queensland's history, being a reflection of a sentiment that saw its expression in the public chronicling of the names of all servicemen.

The Honour Board is important in demonstrating the principal characteristics of a commemorative memorial erected by an employer in honour of employees who saw active service during the First World War and of the elaborate memorial metalwork carried out by Sydney firm Wunderlich Ltd.

The Honour Board exhibits in the elaborate art metalwork an aesthetic quality valued by the community.
