= National Australia Bank (308 Queen Street) =

Heritage-listed building

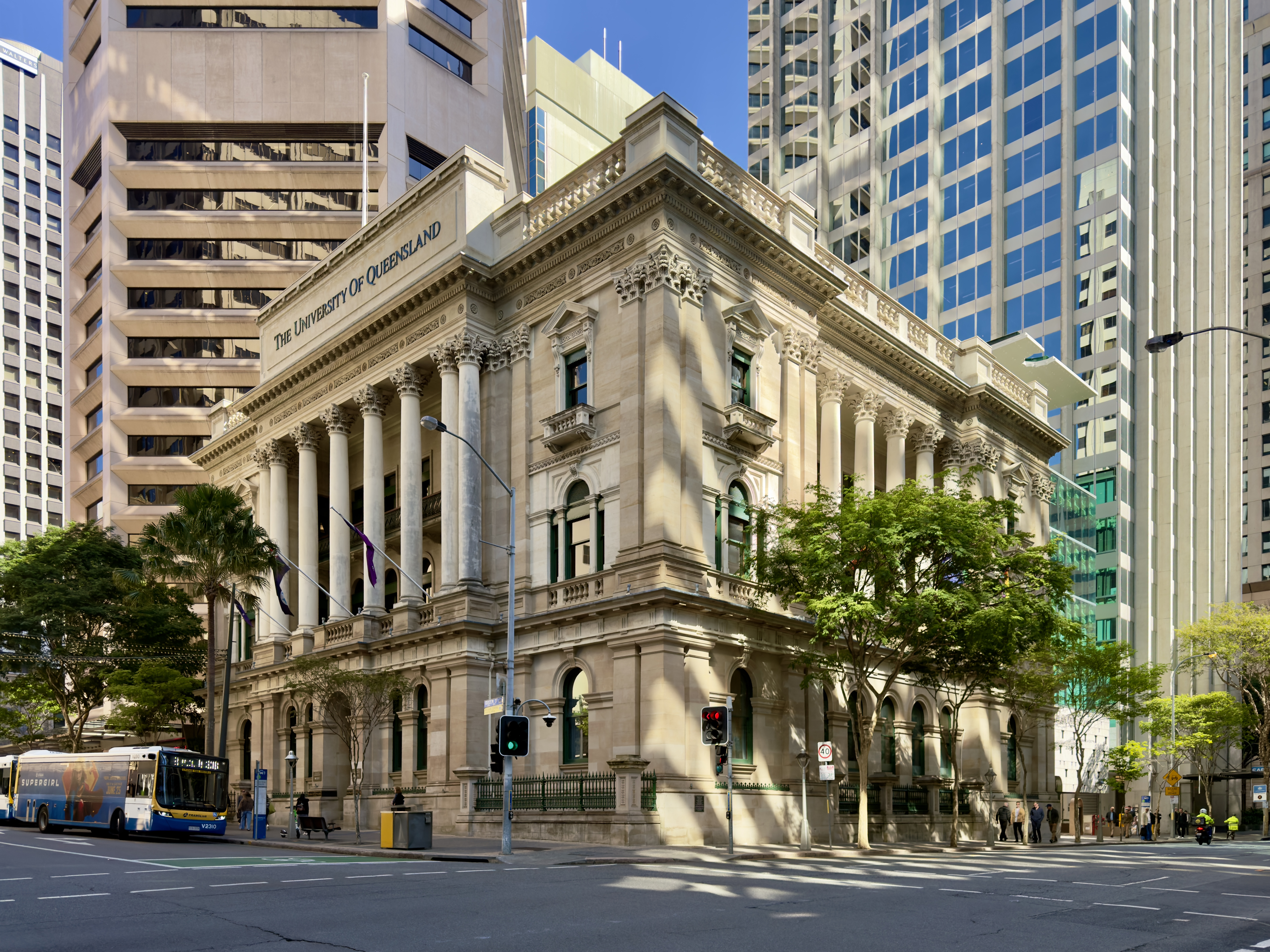
- Queensland National Bank (now National Australia Bank), 2026

- Location within Queensland Location within Australia
- 27.467°S 153.0282°E
- Location: 308 Queen Street, Brisbane, Queensland, Australia

History
- Design period: 1870s–1890s (late 19th century)
- Built: 1881–1924

Site notes
- Architect: Francis Drummond Greville Stanley
- Architectural style: Classicism

Queensland Heritage Register
- Official name: National Australia Bank, Queensland National Bank
- Type: state heritage (built)
- Designated: 21 October 1992
- Reference no.: 600153
- Significant period: 1881–1885, 1924 (fabric); 1885–ongoing (historical)
- Significant components: furniture/fittings, elevator, memorial – honour board/ roll of honour, banking chamber
- Builders: Southall & Tracey

National Australia Bank is a heritage-listed bank building at 308 Queen Street, Brisbane, Queensland, Australia. It was designed by Francis Drummond Greville Stanley and built from 1881–1924 by Southall & Tracey. It is also known as Queensland National Bank. It was added to the Queensland Heritage Register on 21 October 1992.

== History ==
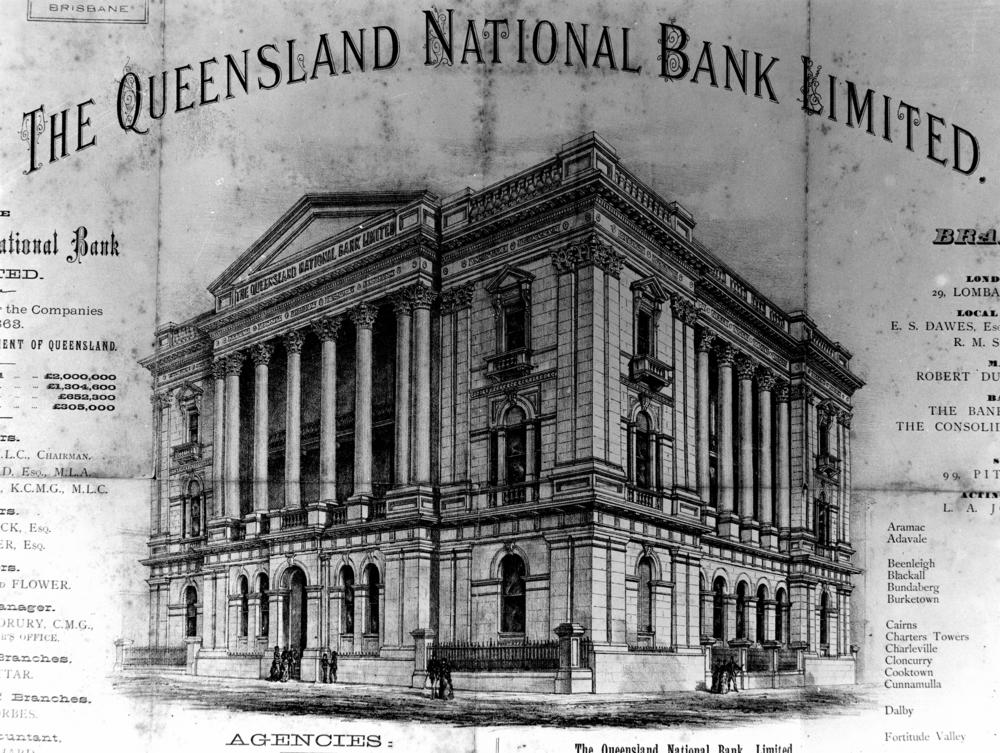
Queensland National Bank Limited, Brisbane, circa 1887

This large masonry building was constructed 1881–1885 as the new Head Office for the successful and influential Queensland National Bank.

The burgeoning gold mining industry of the early 1870s created a mood of optimism and a desire for increased development capital, free from inter-colonial and overseas control. Seizing on this mood, eight prominent local businessmen and politicians formed the Queensland National Bank (QN Bank) in March 1872. Immediate widespread support of the bank exceeded expectations and the continuing patronage of powerful political figures ensured its prominence. When Thomas McIlwraith, a Queensland National Bank director, became Premier in 1879, he swiftly transferred the Queensland Government accounts to the Bank.

In December 1872, the Queensland National Bank, which was leasing Richard Warry's Store in Queen Street, purchased the North Brisbane School of Arts land and building at the corner of Queen and Creek streets for the sum of £8000, as the site for the bank's new Head Office. The bank's lease on Warry's building was not to run out until June 1879 and in the meantime, the School of Arts Committee leased back its original building from the bank.

Choosing an appropriate design for the new building proved to be a long and complicated process. Francis Drummond Greville Stanley, the Queensland Colonial Architect, informed the QN Bank in 1877 that he intended to go into private practice, and the bank's board of directors asked him to design the new head office. However, Stanley did not resign at that time, and the Bank engaged Reed and Barnes of Melbourne to design the building. In August 1878 a plan was adopted with some alterations. More than eight months later, however, Reed and Barnes were requested to sell the plans so Stanley could carry out the design on a reduced scale. With a cheque for 100 guineas for their services, Reed and Barnes reluctantly took their plans back rather than sell them. In the same month, Stanley presented his plans to the bank with a cost estimate of £26,000. Tenders were called for the erection of the building in February 1881 and Messrs Southall and Tracey were successful with a cost of £33,997.

Clerk of Works for the project was John Daniel Heal, publican, building contractor, stonemason and ex-Mayor of Brisbane (1879). Foreman of works for Southall and Tracey was longtime employee William Relf. The foundation stone was laid in July 1881 but delays for want of building materials, particularly the New Zealand stone, extended the construction period by almost 18 months. It was completed by August 1885.

Queensland sandstone, mainly from the Murphy Creek quarries, (specifically selected by Alexander Innes, stonemason and late foreman of the quarries) was used in the construction of the building. New Zealand Oamaru limestone was imported for the Corinthian columns of the Queen and Creek Streets frontages. The mantle pieces and the marble for the entrance hall were purchased by Lt-Colonel Edward Robert Drury, the bank's general manager, while he was in the United Kingdom during 1883–84. The upper floors provided a lavish suite for the manager, while the lower floors accommodated banking chambers and offices. Drury also selected much of the furniture still extant on the bank's upper floors. A passenger lift was installed in the 1890s and electricity replaced gas for the building lighting around the same time.

Manuel Hornibrook, Master Builder, was contracted for the carrying out of extensive additions and the remodelling of the banking chamber during the early months of 1924. Honour boards were installed in the bank after World War I and World War II, to commemorate employees who served in the wars.

Despite the 1890s economic depression and a major political scandal late in the same decade, the QN Bank prospered, retaining the Queensland Government accounts until 1920. Competition with nationally based banks saw a profit decline during the next two decades. The QN Bank merged with National Bank of Australasia in 1947 and its successor, the National Australia Bank, now owns the premises. In recognition of the bank's decision not to redevelop the site during the 1970s, the National Trust of Queensland presented it with the John Herbert Award 1975–1976. In 1981 considerable refurbishment and restoration of the building took place. Subsequently, only minor works have been carried out.

In 2006, the National Australia Bank sold the building to Trinity Group (later known as Unity Pacific Group). Trinity Group refurbished the bank building (known as The Chambers) and constructed an adjoining 8-storey office building (known as The Tower) at the rear of the building at 88 Creek Street, replacing a 1920s extension. The architects were for the project were Donovan Hill and the work was carried out under the supervision of conservation architect Robert Riddel. The Tower was completed in 2008. Trinity used the buildings as its national headquarters, leasing the banking chamber on the ground floor back to the National Australia Bank and as well as offering other office tenancies.

In 2016, Primewest purchased The Chambers and The Tower for $37.4 million from Unity Pacific Group.

In December 2019 the University of Queensland purchased The Chambers and The Tower at a total cost of $47.4 million. The buildings will form part of the university's Brisbane central business district campus.

== Description ==
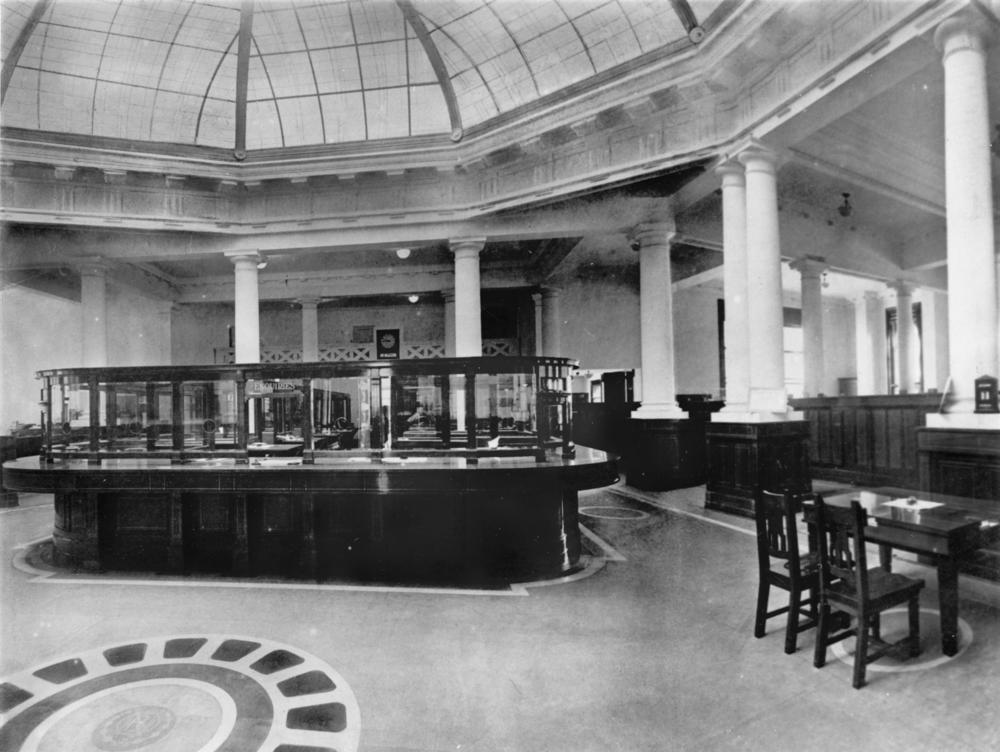
Banking chamber, 1922

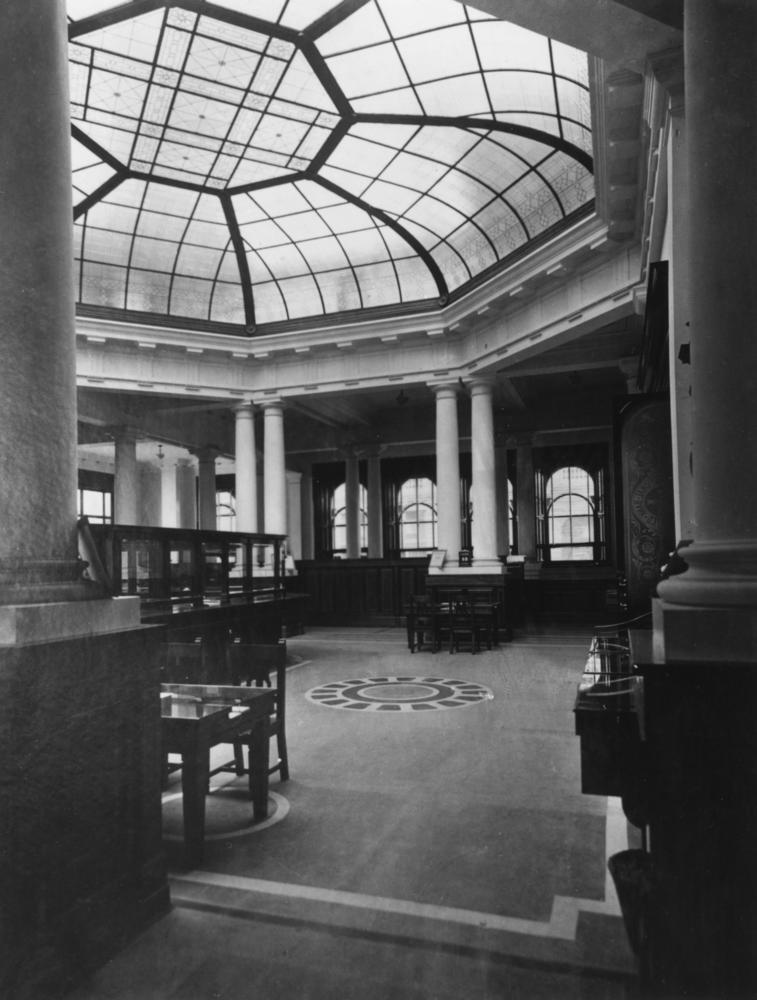
Glass ceiling in the banking chamber, circa 1889

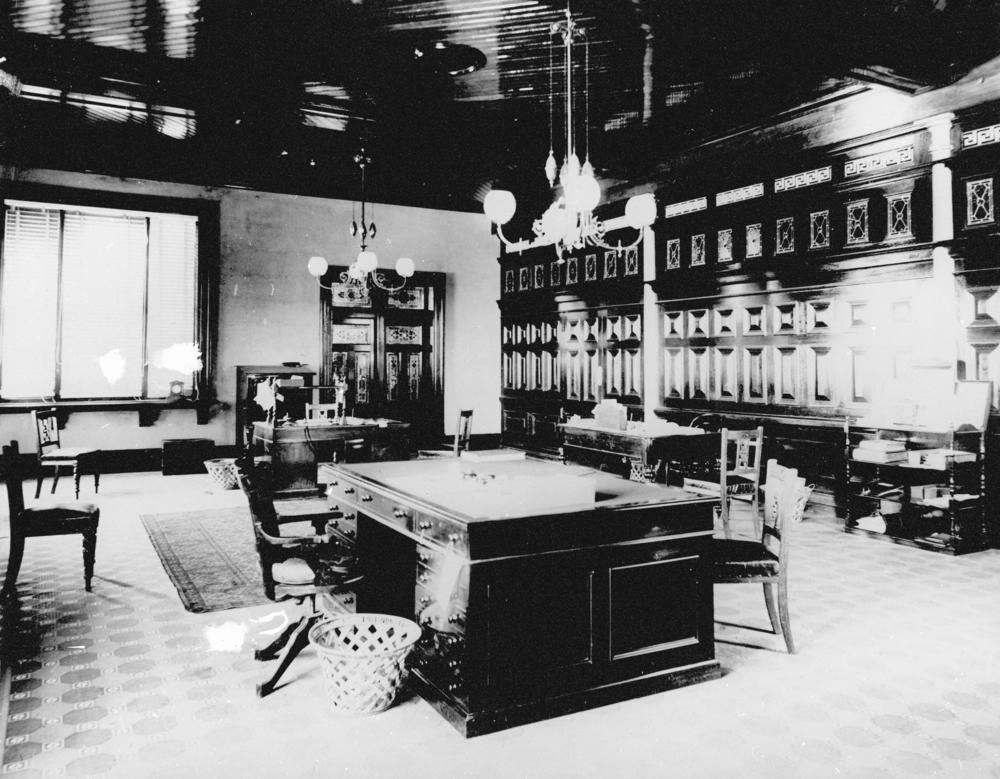
Office, circa 1889

The former Queensland National Bank building is a three-storeyed brick structure with sandstone facings, built in the Classical Revival style which was common in bank architecture of the period. The building has a distinct Palladian influence with careful classical detailing and giant order columns. It is built on a corner, and the two facades are dominated by bays of Corinthian columns which rise through the upper two storeys. This portion of the Queen Street facade protrudes in the form of a porch while the similar colonnade on Creek Street is recessed. The ground floor level has a plinth with arched openings set between groups of pilasters. Recessed behind the balconies of the upper-level central bays are more openings. Local sandstone was mainly used as the wall facing material and the pilasters, and locally grown cedar for the main entry doors, while the giant order Corinthian columns are imported Oamaru limestone. These columns rise from the first floor balcony. The pediment which originally surmounted the Queen Street facade was replaced by a brick and concrete oblong in 1915.

The building has a high degree of integrity externally and internally including original furnishings. It has many grand spaces including the Banking Chamber with its glazed roof and supporting columns, the Formal Dining Room, and the Board Room. The lift with its surrounding stair is a major feature of the building. First and Second World War Honour Boards are located to either side of the entry and face into the main banking chamber (see First World War Honour Board, National Australia Bank (308 Queen Street)).

== Heritage listing ==
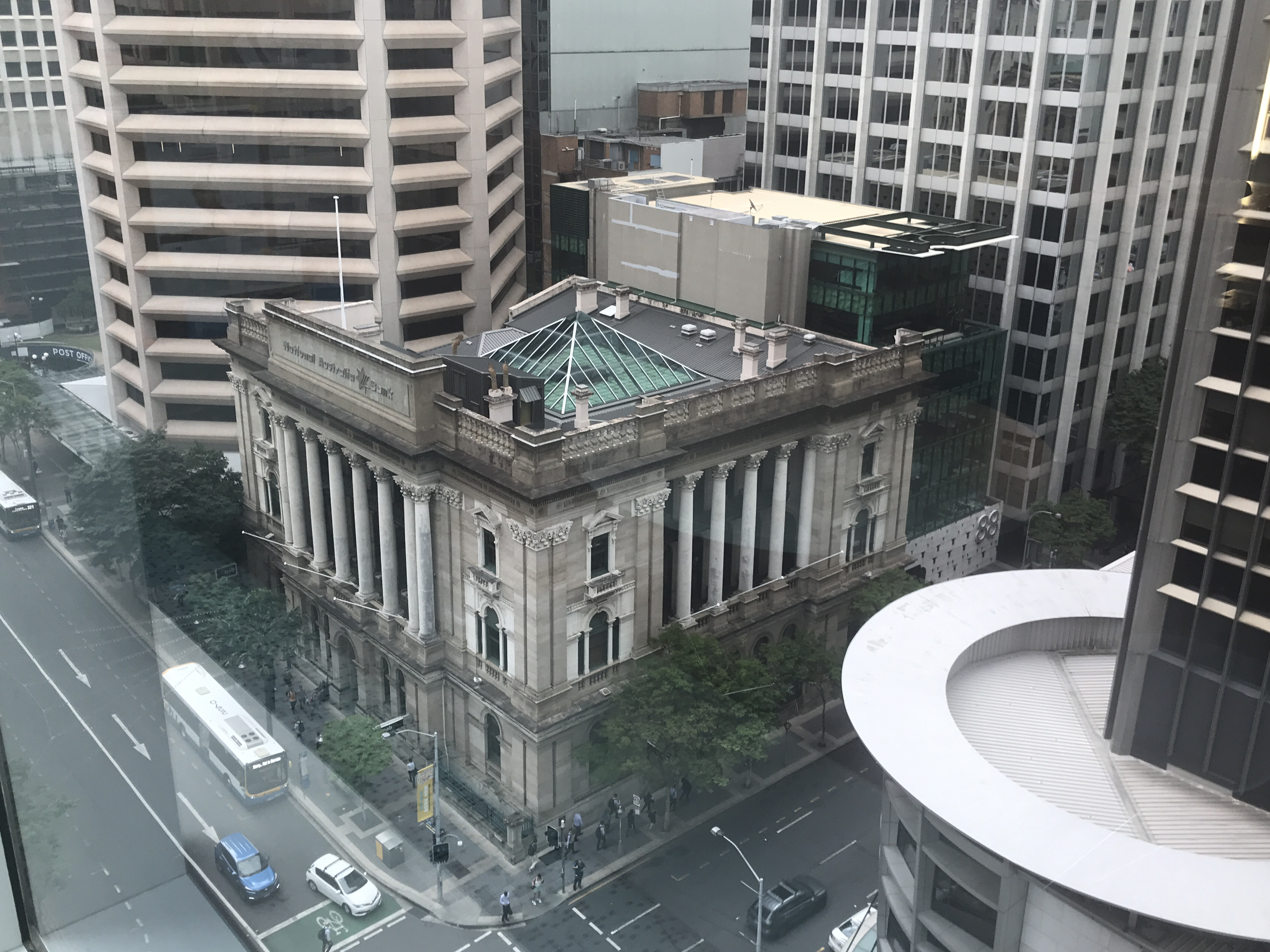
Aerial view, Queen Street to the left, Creek Street to the right, 2020

National Australia Bank was listed on the Queensland Heritage Register on 21 October 1992 having satisfied the following criteria.

The place is important in demonstrating the evolution or pattern of Queensland's history.

The former Queensland National Bank head office is important in demonstrating the pattern of Queensland's history, being a major symbol of the economic growth in Queensland of the 1880s and a reflection of the close relationship between the Queensland National Bank and the Queensland Government at that time.

The Honour Board is important in demonstrating the evolution of Queensland's history, being a reflection of a sentiment that saw its expression in the public chronicling of the names of all servicemen.

The place demonstrates rare, uncommon or endangered aspects of Queensland's cultural heritage.

The former Queensland National Bank head office demonstrates a rare aspect of Queensland's history, being a substantial and important 1880s commercial building in the Brisbane central business district which has retained a high degree of external and internal intactness, including much of the original furniture and fixture.

The place is important in demonstrating the principal characteristics of a particular class of cultural places.

The former Queensland National Bank head office is important in demonstrating the principal characteristics of a substantial commercial building in the Classical Revival style, distinguished by the quality of its detailing and materials.

The Honour Board is important in demonstrating the principal characteristics of a commemorative memorial erected by an employer in honour of employees who saw active service during the First World War and of the elaborate memorial metalwork carried out by Sydney firm Wunderlich Ltd.

The place is important because of its aesthetic significance.

The former Queensland National Bank head office is important in exhibiting a range of aesthetic characteristics valued by the community, in particular its streetscape value on a prominent corner in Brisbane's central business district and its expression of the elan and the solidity which the Queensland National Bank attempted to project in the early 1880s and its high degree of external and internal intactness.

The Honour Board exhibits in the elaborate art metalwork an aesthetic quality valued by the community.

The place has a special association with the life or work of a particular person, group or organisation of importance in Queensland's history.

The former Queensland National Bank head office has a special association with the life and work of prominent Queensland architect, FDG Stanley, being one of the finest works attributed to him and with the Queensland National Bank's first General Manager, Lt-Colonel ER Drury, being evidence of his power and influence both in the bank and in Queensland in the last quarter of the 19th century.

== See also ==
- First World War Honour Board at the bank
