= Wunderlich Tile Works =

Former manufacturing site in Melbourne, Victoria, Australia

- Location of the former factory in Melbourne
- Built: 1932
- Location: 656 Mitcham Road; Vermont, Melbourne, Victoria, Australia
- Coordinates: 37°49′59″S 145°11′30″E
- Industry: Building products
- Products: Terracotta roof tiles
- Owners: Wunderlich Limited (1925–1969); CSR Limited (1969–1983); Monier Australia (1983–1994); CSR Limited (since 1994)
- Defunct: August 1990

Site notes
- Condition: Poor; derelict; fenced
- Current use: Potential development site
- Public access: No; gated and locked

Victorian Heritage Register
- Official name: Wunderlich/Monier Terracotta Roof Tiles Complex
- Type: Registered place
- Designated: 19 December 1996
- Reference no.: H1008
- Heritage overlay no.: HO5
- Category: Manufacturing and Processing

The Wunderlich Tile Works is a former terracotta roof tile manufacturing plant site located in Vermont, an eastern suburb of Melbourne, in Victoria, Australia. Established in 1932, the plant was closed in 1990 when a new plant was established nearby.

The former manufacturing plant was added to the Victorian Heritage Register on 19 December 1996 in recognition of its historic and architectural significance. The building was also added to a non-statutory list by the Victorian branch of the National Trust on 3 August 1998.

== History ==
In 1892, the Wunderlich company—founded by Ernest Julius Wunderlich and his brothers, also renown for its pressed metal ceilings—received its first shipment of terracotta roof tiles from Marseille, France; and subsequently became the principal importer of terracotta roof tiles in Australia up until World War I, when shipping lines were stopped.

From the mid-19th century and thereafter, Vermont, Mitcham, and Blackburn were well known for their high-quality clays and brick-making works were established in the area. To support domestic manufacture, the Wunderlich company established plants in Rosehill (c. 1908), and Brunswick (1925), with a clay pit in the adjacent suburb of Vermont. A laboratory was also established in Rosehill around this time.

In 1932, a plant in Vermont was opened and provided local employment for miners and factory workers. The Brunswick factory was shut down and all plant and equipment relocated to the Vermont site. The Vermont site was forced to close during World War II and the factory reopened in February 1946.

Over the ensuring years, the Wunderlink company became the largest Australian manufacturer of terracotta roofing tiles, a material which literally changed the appearance of Australian suburbs, and which continued to remain popular. In 1969, CSR Limited acquired the roof tile manufacturing business of Wunderlich.

By 1971, the company had converted the original kilns from coal to natural gas and tree planting on the site alleviated some concerns over the environmental impact of the tile works to nearby residential areas. By 1977, the process of clay digging was mostly completed with machinery and Wunderlich Tile Works was one of only five clay works still in operation in the Nunawading area. In 1983 Monier purchased Wunderlich and in turn Monier's Australian businesses were acquired by CSR in 1994.

== Description ==
The Vermont manufacturing plant, which retains its original office building, is the largest and most intact pre-war tile works in Victoria. The down draught kiln is the earliest known survivor of its type. The works are architecturally significant for their use of lattice timber roof trusses in the curved roof structure which housed the kilns. This roof structure, probably relocated from the Brunswick tile works, is a rare industrial roof form, and the only known example of this type of truss in Victoria.

A new 6,000-square-metre (65,000 sq ft) factory was opened on the site in August 1990, that replaced the 1932 factory.

Since 1994 the site has undergone extensive redevelopment including the demolition of the two chimneys, kilns and its surrounding factory buildings and the construction of new warehouses. Parts of the original structures were demolished in 2008.

== See also ==
- List of manufacturing plants in Melbourne
