= St Isidore's =

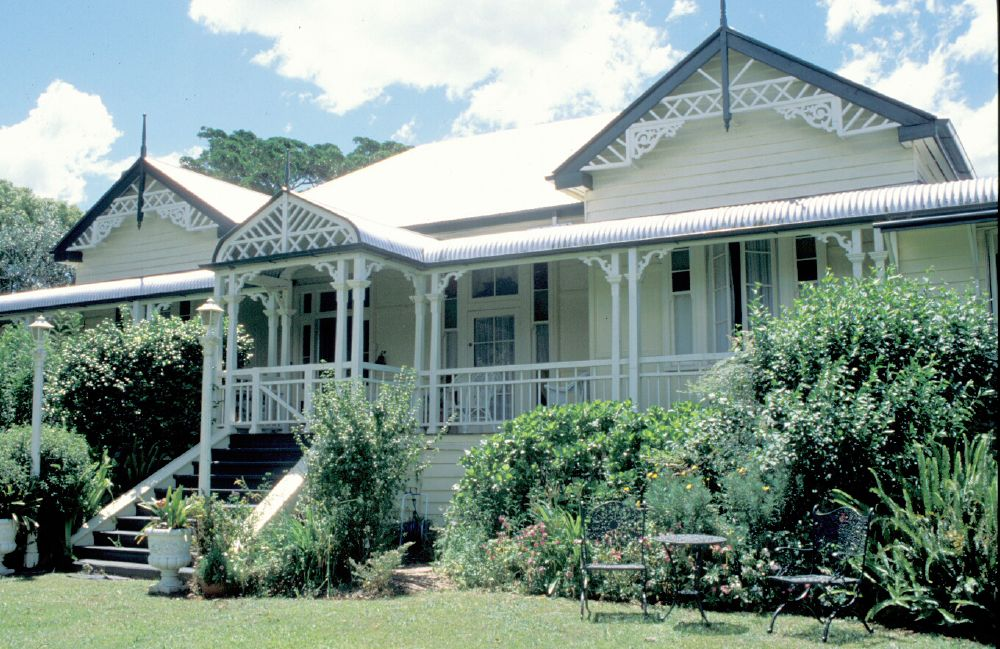
- St Isidore's, 1998

- Location within Queensland Location within Australia
- 26.6197°S 152.8654°E
- Location: 40 Post Office Road, Mapleton, Sunshine Coast Region, Queensland, Australia

History
- Design period: 1900–1914 (early 20th century)
- Built: c. 1900–c. 1913

Queensland Heritage Register
- Official name: St Isidore's, Mapleton Homestead, Seaview House, St Isidore's Farm College
- Type: state heritage (built)
- Designated: 28 July 2000
- Reference no.: 601467
- Significant period: 1900s–1910s (fabric); 1900s–1940s (historical)
- Significant components: trees/plantings, garden/grounds, farmhouse
- Builders: James Blair Cramb

St Isidore's is a heritage-listed homestead at 40 Post Office Road, Mapleton, Sunshine Coast Region, Queensland, Australia. It was built from c. 1900 to c. 1913 by James Blair Cramb. It is also known as Mapleton Homestead, Seaview House, and St Isidore's Farm College. It was added to the Queensland Heritage Register on 28 July 2000.

== History ==
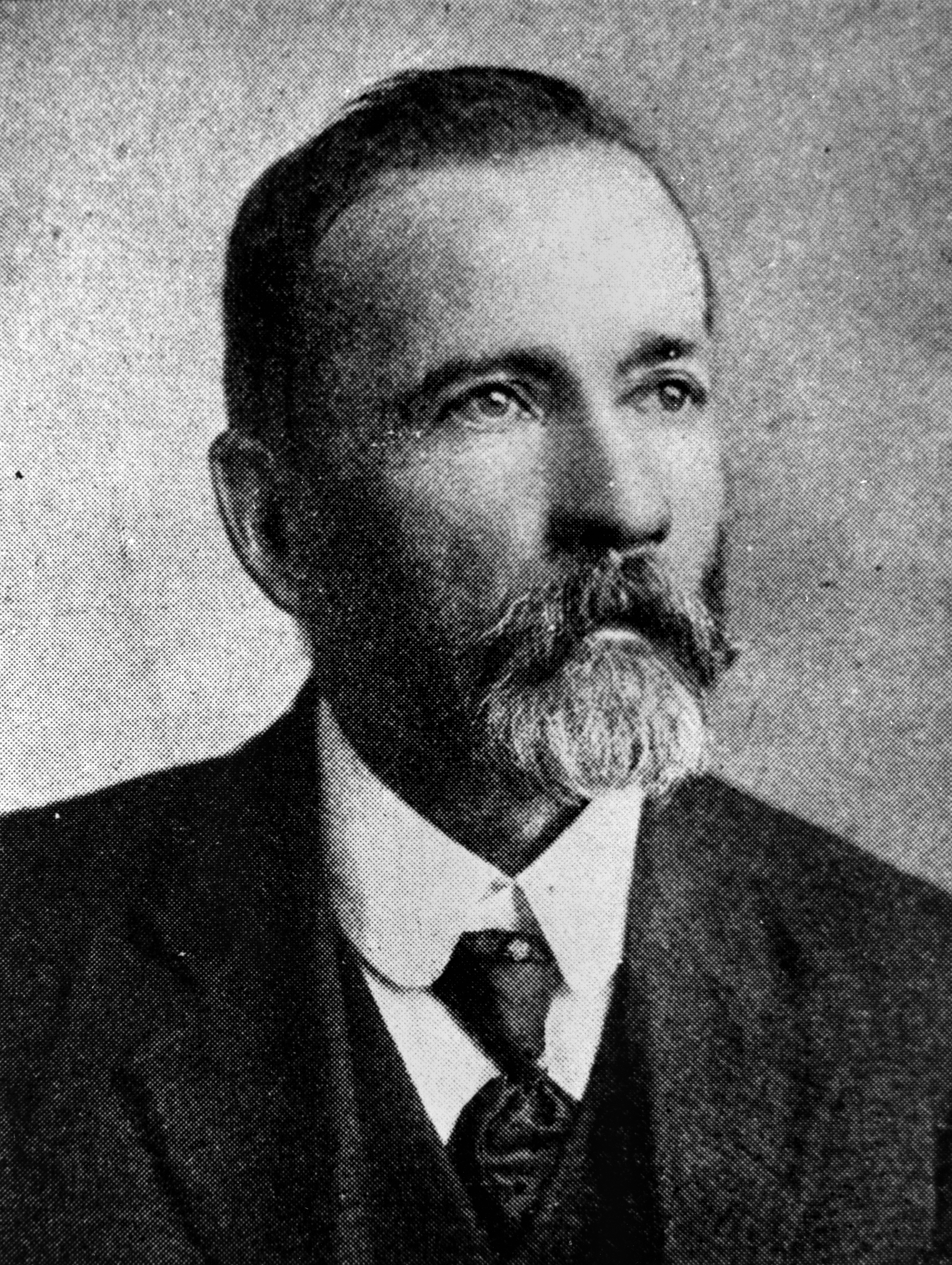
William James Smith, pioneer of Mapleton

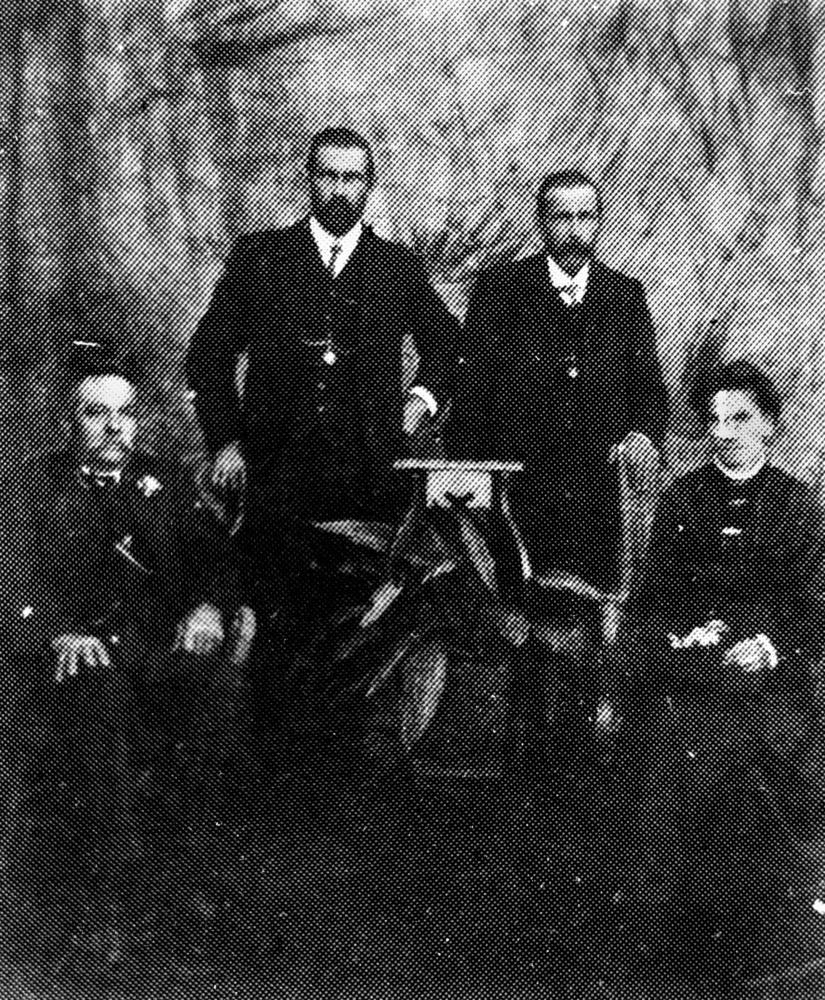
Smith family of Mapleton

This substantial, high-set timber residence was erected in the early 1900s in at least two stages, for pioneer Mapleton orchardist William James Smith and his family, at their Seaview Orchard at the top of the Blackall Range. In August 1923 the well-known Seaview Orchard was acquired by the Roman Catholic Archbishop of Brisbane, the Rev. James Duhig, who hoped to develop it as St Isidore's Farm College. Although this and adjoining farms remained the property of the Church until the early 1950s, the college was never established.

WJ Smith and his brother Thomas David were the first to take up land in the Mapleton district, and had an important association with fruit-growing in Southeast Queensland in the late 19th and early 20th centuries. They had arrived in Queensland from England in 1880 with their parents, who established banana and strawberry farm at Redland Bay. In 1889 WJ and TD Smith, both in their early twenties, explored the Mapleton district (then unnamed) on the Blackall Range, in search of land suitable for banana growing. Since 1860 the Range had been logged for its extensive cedar, beech and pine resources, but difficulty of access had deterred farming settlement. In 1889 the North Coast railway line was completed as far as Caboolture, and a coach ran to Noosa, but the only way into the Blackall Range was by foot.

The Smith brothers each selected land at the eastern edge of the range, near later Mapleton Falls, but WJ Smith relinquished his claim when he realised the block selected was not the land he anticipated. In 1890 they began clearing Thomas' selection, selling the red cedar to a logging company, and erecting a slab house. Their sister Amy came from Redland Bay to housekeep for them. By 1891 they had established a pasture paddock and had planted bananas (the butts obtained from Redland Bay) and subsistence crops. They also took contracts to open a road into the district – a track suitable for pack horses, opened in 1891.

In the early 1890s other settlers took up land in the area. Bananas were grown initially, but even with the opening of the railway to Nambour in 1890, low prices and the expense and difficulty encountered in transporting produce down the range produced small returns. By 1892, the Smith brothers were pioneering the cultivation of citrus at Mapleton. Strawberries were planted between the citrus seedlings, and these proved profitable as an interim crop.

In September 1891 WJ Smith married Sarah Anne Imogene (Annie) Collins, whose family were Redland Bay settlers, and the couple returned to the Blackall Range. In mid-1892 Smith selected the property which he developed as Seaview Orchard (portion 185v, parish of Maroochy, comprising just under 160 acres of dense vine scrub). About the same time David J Williams, who married Amy Smith in 1892, selected a block adjacent to WJ Smith.

For a brief period the district was known as Luton Vale, after a postal receiving office opened at EH Biggs' Lutonvale Orchard in January 1893. Later, at a public meeting held in March 1894, Mapleton was chosen as the formal name for the settlement, at WJ Smith's suggestion.

During the 1890s, most of the Mapleton settlers resided in slab huts while they established their farms and orchards. DJ Williams reputedly was the first to erect a pit-sawn timber house, in 1895. By August 1897, when WJ Smith was applying for a title to his selection, the family was still residing in a 22-by-18-foot (6.7 m × 5.5 m), 4-roomed split timber dwelling with a shingled roof, valued at £20. They had about 8 acres of their 160 acres cleared and planted with fruit trees, 2 acres partly cleared and under grass, and 6 acres felled. Having fulfilled the conditions of selection, title was issued to WJ Smith in January 1898.

By 1900, Mapleton was emerging as an important fruit-growing district. A provisional school opened in mid-1899, and the original Nambour-Mapleton road, used by wheeled vehicles since c. 1894, had been cleared. The Smiths (David Smith snr (who had joined his sons at Mapleton c. 1894), TD Smith and WJ Smith) were the principal citrus growers in the district, Seaview Orchard alone containing over 1,000 fruit trees by 1903. Large quantities of strawberries were still grown, fetching good prices at Brisbane, Sydney and Melbourne.

The first section of Seaview House may have been constructed by October 1906, when the WJ Smiths hosted a luncheon in their barn for the Queensland Governor, Lord Chelmsford, during his brief tour of the Blackall Range. At this time the place was described as a beautiful home, suggesting that it was much more than the slab hut extant in 1897. A photograph published in The Queenslander of 29 July 1911 shows the core of the present house, with its two front gables and front and side verandahs, set in a partly established garden. The house contained 6 rooms originally, but was extended to 10 rooms c. 1913. The pressed metal internal finishes may have been installed during the extensions, since the Sydney-based pressed metal manufacturer, Wunderlich Ltd, had opened its Brisbane art metal factory and tile yards in January 1913. A photograph published in 1921 but likely taken c. 1915/16, shows the house in its present form, with the western extension.

Timber used in the construction is likely to have been milled locally, WH Rosser having opened the Mapleton Sawmill, about 1 mile (1.6 km) northwest of the township in January 1909. Although destroyed by fire c. 1911, it was quickly rebuilt by Rosser and Willbrandt on the eastern side of Mapleton Hall grounds.

The builder of Seaview House was James Blair Cramb, who married the Smiths' daughter Ethel Florence (Florrie) in 1912. He also built DJ Williams' new home, Caringa, c. 1911. The Williams were neighbours of the WJ Smiths, related by marriage, and their homes, situated within close proximity, were very similar in appearance. Caringa has been moved to Yandina.

In 1910, WJ Smith subdivided portion 185v, parish of Maroochy, Seaview house and orchard remaining on approximately 35 acres.

By the early 1910s Mapleton was a prosperous agricultural district, specialising in citrus and banana growing and dairying. In 1914–1915 Maroochy Shire Council extended the former Moreton Central Mill tramline from Kureelpa to Mapleton to serve the Blackall Range fruitgrowers. The Range had become one of the leading fruit-producing districts in Queensland, and Seaview Orchard was famous.

The WJ Smiths were pioneers and leaders in their local community, assisting many new farmers in the district. They were heavily involved with the Mapleton Methodist Church and William was a member of the local masonic order and of the School Committee, Tramway Committee, and Progress Association, being elected President of the latter in June 1911. In 1914 he was made chairman of the influential Queensland Fruitgrowers' Industrial Trading Society. Annie Smith was noted for her community activities, and for her First World War patriotic work. In 1919 they retired from citrus growing and moved to Northgate in Brisbane, but prior to their leaving the Mapleton district, they were accorded a public farewell and address. In 1928 they moved to Maroochydore, where they conducted a store at Picnic Point for some years. Both William and Annie died in the 1950s, when in their eighties.

In 1919 WJ Smith sold Seaview Orchard and residence to James Miller, who in 1923 sold the orchard to the Archbishop of Brisbane, Rev. James Duhig. The sale included Seaview House: a large roomy structure, with a delightful garden in front, artistically laid out, with graceful palms at the entrance. Duhig acquired in total about 130 acres at Mapleton, which he intended to develop as a Catholic agricultural college. A dormitory wing extension to Seaview House was planned; a farm manager was employed; and the property was renamed St Isidore's Farm College. However, Duhig's vision was not shared by the Brisbane diocese in general, who refused to finance the establishment of a Catholic agricultural college at Mapleton. In addition, Duhig failed to attract a monastic order to take charge of the proposed college. He more or less abandoned the farm manager, who could not run the place effectively by himself and without funds. The once fine orchard was allowed to deteriorate, and the place was in debt. In June 1932, when Messrs D Zalatel & Co. took possession of the furniture at St Isidore's Farm College, the former Seaview residence had been little altered, comprising hall, sitting room, dining room, kitchen, pantry, breakfast room, laundry, four bedrooms, one verandah bedroom, and a bathroom.

It is unlikely that the former Seaview Orchard would have been sustained, even had the college become a reality. From the 1930s to the 1950s, citrus growing in the Mapleton district gradually gave way to dairying, timber, small cropping and, in the 1950s, pineapples. The once spectacularly successful commercial citrus industry on the Blackall Range disappeared, due to a collapse in the citrus market in the early 1930s, insect damage, and competition from citrus farming in irrigated areas (such as the Lockyer Valley).

By February 1947, when the National Catholic Rural Movement (NCRM) took over management of St Isidore's Farm College, aiming to bring it back into production and to establish an Agricultural Training College, there was no cultivation and no livestock on the farm, the property was overgrown with weeds, and its three houses, including the former Seaview residence, were in disrepair. Within eight months, under a capable farm manager, fields of potatoes, onions and citrus trees had been planted, there were plans to begin softwood silviculture, and an additional 150 acres had been purchased. Yet again, the college did not eventuate. In 1951 Duhig sold the property, which was worked as a private farm until subdivision in the late 1960s, following a real estate boom as weekend hobby farmers and retirees supplanted dairy farmers and fruit growers.

Mapleton is now principally a residential and tourist area, with some small-scale fruit and vegetable farming. By 1980, the former Seaview House was situated on a considerably reduced block of approximately 1 hectare (2.5 acres). Known as Mapleton Homestead through the 1980s, it functioned as a private residence until opened in 1990 as Sea View Guest House, run by the MacDonagh family, and later by the O'Briens. The house was sold on yet a smaller subdivision in 1995, the new owners returning it to a family home and renaming it St Isidore's. The front yard remains, although the original garden layout has been altered. The front section of the garden, closest to the road, has been subdivided as two blocks, with different owners.

== Description ==
St Isidore's is a large, high-set timber residence, situated on the eastern edge of the Blackall Range, at Mapleton. From the eastern rooms and verandahs, there are extensive views over the Maroochy Plains to the Pacific Ocean. The house once formed the vista at the northern end of the main road through Mapleton, but trees in the front garden now obscure the house from the street. The house is timber-framed, clad externally mostly with weatherboards, and with vertically-jointed boards on those external walls protected by front or side verandahs. The western extension, which is of a later date to the core of the house, is clad in chamferboards. The original diagonally arranged battens between the stumps have been replaced with later weatherboards, but most of this is obscured by surrounding garden plantings.

St Isidore's presents an aesthetically pleasing exterior, engendered largely by its complex hipped roof clad with corrugated iron sheeting (not the original), and decorative timberwork to verandahs and gables. The house has front and side projecting gables, separate roofs over front and side verandahs, and a projecting, gabled portico over the centrally positioned front steps. There is decorative timber lattice, or a combination of lattice and fretwork, on each of the gables, including the front portico, but that on the western gable, which is a later addition, is much simpler in design. All the gables have timber finials. The eastern verandah has been enclosed, but the front and western verandahs retain their original timber detailing, including double chamfered posts with brackets and a simple dowel balustrade. A late 20th century deck extension off the enclosed eastern verandah, with its side entrance, has a replica gabled portico and steps, echoing that on the front elevation.

There have been a number of alterations to the rear (north) elevation, including the addition of a skillion-roofed, weatherboard-enclosed bathroom at the western end, and a recent breakfast room off the kitchen. Attached to the rear of the house is a conservatory. The remaining back yard is taken up by a swimming pool and garage.

Externally, the house suggests a symmetrical plan, but internally, the rooms are arranged in an idiosyncratic fashion, reflective of its construction in at least two stages. The c. 1915/16 layout is still highly readable, despite the removal of several internal walls and the creation of an ensuite bathroom for each of the four bedrooms.

The interior is remarkable for its extensive use of decorative pressed metal ceilings, cornices, ceiling roses, architraves, and dados, in almost every room of the house. Many of the designs are Art Nouveau in inspiration, including that of the dado panels in the vestibule, which has been identified in an early 20th century Wunderlich catalogue. There is also a pressed metal architrave used externally on the bay window to the bedroom in the front southwest corner of the house. This window is protected by a verandah.

In addition, much use of early 20th century coloured glass has been made throughout the house – in windows, doors, side and fanlights to doors and to windows, and as a screen between the entrance vestibule and the hallway which leads to the bedrooms. Etched glass has also been used, although not as extensively.

The most distinctive change has been the removal of two walls in the eastern wing, to form one large, L-shaped living room from two smaller rooms and a passageway. However, the pressed metal ceilings of the original rooms have been retained, indicating the original room arrangement. Large, clear-glass casement windows in the eastern and northern walls of this large room offer extensive views to the ocean.

The interior has been painted throughout, and some of the floors have had new timber laid over the original flooring.

The grounds contain several mature trees, possibly part of the early 20th century garden, including a large fig tree on the northern boundary of the house block. Some of the early garden layout may survive.

== Heritage listing ==
St Isidore's was listed on the Queensland Heritage Register on 28 July 2000 having satisfied the following criteria.

The place is important in demonstrating the evolution or pattern of Queensland's history.

St Isidore's, erected in the early 1900s (in at least two stages) as the residence on Seaview Orchard, has historical significance for its association with the successful development of the Blackall Range as one of the principal citrus-producing districts in Queensland in the early 20th century.

The place demonstrates rare, uncommon or endangered aspects of Queensland's cultural heritage.

It is also significant as one of the few remaining substantial homes of this era left on the Range.

The place is important in demonstrating the principal characteristics of a particular class of cultural places.

The house is important in demonstrating the principal characteristics of a substantial and well-detailed early 20th century rural residence.

The place is important because of its aesthetic significance.

It has a number of aesthetic qualities, including the gabled form; decorative facade with wide verandahs intended to take advantage of the breezes and views over the Maroochy plains to the Pacific Ocean; extensive use of decorative pressed metal panelling and coloured glass; and the garden setting.

The place has a special association with the life or work of a particular person, group or organisation of importance in Queensland's history.

The place is significant for its association with WJ Smith and his family and their important contribution to the establishment and growth of Mapleton and to the development of fruitgrowing in Queensland in the late 19th and early 20th centuries.
