= Ernest Julius Wunderlich =

Australian arts patron (1859–1945)

Ernest Wunderlich
- Born: Ernest Henry Charles Julius Wunderlich; 16 May 1859; Islington, London, England
- Died: 11 April 1945 (aged 85); Bondi Junction, Sydney, Australia
- Education: École Polytechnique, Lausanne
- Occupations: Industrialist; arts patron; author
- Board member of: Wunderlich Limited (1892–1945)
- Spouse: Fanny Amalia Hoesch (m. 1885–1942)
- Children: 1 son

Ernest Julius Wunderlich (16 May 1859 – 11 April 1945) was an Australian industrialist, arts patron, and author.

== Early years ==
Born in Islington, London, England on 16 May 1859, together with his brothers, Frederick Otto (b. 1861) and Alfred (b. 1865), he was educated in London and Germany. Ernest commenced studying architecture and technical drawing, aged 16 years, at the École Polytechnique, in Lausanne and, after an engineering apprenticeship, became an articled clerk and travelling salesman. He travelled to South Africa selling pianos, and returned to London in 1884, and married the following year.

== Business in Australia ==
Wunderlich and his new wife arrived in Sydney in 1885. He worked as a manufacturers' agent, advertising for a time as a wine and spirit merchant. He imported stamped zinc mansard windows for a Sydney builder, before importing German stamped metal ceilings, the earliest of which were installed in the Sydney Town Hall and in the piano showrooms of Octavius Beale and William Paling.

Joined by his brother Alfred in 1887, Ernest took out his first patent for 'an improved ceiling' in April 1888. They sold their patents in December 1889 to W. H. Rocke & Co. of Melbourne who had established a ceiling factory in Redfern; Ernest became manager in Melbourne and Alfred in Sydney. Late in 1892 the Sydney branch became insolvent: the brothers redeemed their patents, raised A£10,000 and formed the Wunderlich Patent Ceiling and Roofing Company Limited (later incorporated as Wunderlich Limited), which specialised in Wunderlich decorative metal panels.

By 1897 Wunderlich Limited also advertised as sole agent for imported Marseilles tiles; that became prevalent through Australia in the mid-20th century as red roof tiles. Ernest Wunderlich served as chairman of Wunderlich Limited until 1945, with his two brothers involved in operating various parts of the business that expanded to manufacture and distribute textured bricks, garden effects, asbestos and fibrous plaster boards and pipes.

== Later life and legacy ==
Wunderlich travelled extensively. He died in Bondi Junction, Sydney, on 11 April 1945.

Wunderlich was a passionate patron of the arts. He helped to establish the Sydney Conservatorium of Music, was a trustee of the Australian Museum, a fellow of the Royal Society, and he commissioned Alfred Hill to compose his String Quartet No. 2.

He published an autobiography, All My Yesterdays—A Mosiac of Music and Manufacturing in 1945.

== See also ==
- Wunderlich (panels)
- Wunderlich Tile Works
