= Wunderlich (panels) =

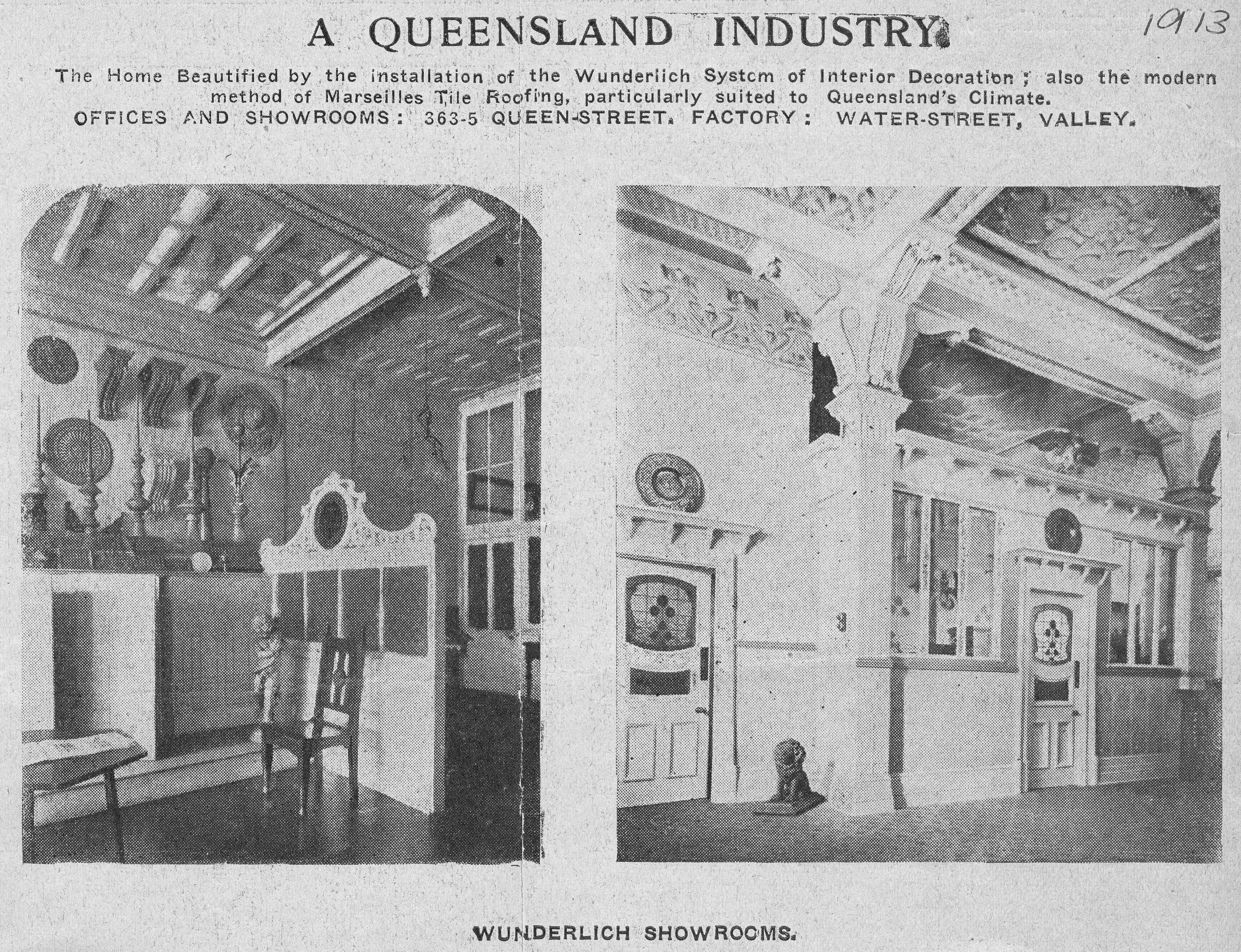
Wunderlich showrooms, Brisbane, 1913

Wunderlich were a brand of decorative metal panels used for pressed metal ceilings and other architectural elements in Australia.

== History ==
The Wunderlich company was established by Ernest Julius Wunderlich in Sydney, New South Wales, Australia in 1885. Initially the panels were imported from Berlin, Germany but later patents were taken out and the panels were manufactured in Australia.

The panels were produced until the 1950s when popular tastes changed away from these traditional elements. In 1983, production of the panels recommenced to meet the needs of restorations of period buildings.

== Notable uses of Wunderlich products ==
- Barnes and Co. Trading Place
- Bishop's House, Toowoomba
- Esk War Memorial
- First World War Honour Board, National Australia Bank (308 Queen Street)
- Graceville Uniting Church
- Gympie Court House
- Mount Macedon Memorial Cross
- National Australia Bank (308 Queen Street)
- North Pine Pumping Station
- Our Lady of Assumption Convent, Warwick
- Santa Barbara, New Farm
- Sandgate Town Hall
- Sydney Town Hall
- St Isidore's
- Sacred Heart Cathedral, Wellington

== See also ==
- Tin ceiling
- Wunderlich Tile Works
