= List of Sunshine Coast Region suburbs =

Communities in South East Queensland

The list of Sunshine Coast Region suburbs includes a range of suburbs, localities, towns and rural districts in South East Queensland, Australia, within the local government area of Sunshine Coast Region. On 1 January 2014, part of the region deamalgamated to re-establish the Shire of Noosa.

As of 2021, there were 41 suburbs within the Sunshine Coast Region local government authority (LGA), versus 7 suburbs in neighbouring Noosa.

== Urban centres ==
The Sunshine Coast contains a number of urban centres, each with a contiguous urban area and a central business district, which for planning and amenity purposes are maintained on separate plans by the Regional Council and treated as discrete sub-regions by the Australian Bureau of Statistics. They are:

- Caloundra Sub-Region
- Kawana Waters Sub-Region
- Maroochydore Sub-Region
- Buderim Sub-Region
- Coolum Sub-Region
- Nambour Sub-Region

== Suburbs ==
=== Caloundra area ===
- Aroona
- Bald Knob
- Balmoral Ridge
- Battery Hill
- Beerburrum
- Beerwah
- Bells Creek
- Birtinya
- Bokarina
- Booroobin
- Bribie Island North
- Buddina
- Caloundra
- Caloundra West
- Cambroon
- Conondale
- Coochin Creek
- Crohamhurst
- Curramore
- Currimundi
- Diamond Valley
- Dicky Beach
- Elaman Creek
- Glass House Mountains
- Glenview
- Golden Beach
- Harper Creek
- Kings Beach
- Landsborough
- Little Mountain
- Maleny
- Meridan Plains
- Minyama
- Moffat Beach
- Mooloolah Valley
- Mount Mellum
- North Maleny
- Nirimba
- Palmview
- Parrearra
- Peachester
- Pelican Waters
- Reesville
- Shelly Beach
- Warana
- Witta
- Wootha
- Wurtulla

=== Maroochy area ===
- Alexandra Headland
- Belli Park
- Bli Bli
- Bridges
- Buderim
- Burnside
- Chevallum
- Coes Creek
- Coolabine
- Cooloolabin
- Coolum Beach
- Cotton Tree
- Diddillibah
- Doonan (Note: Shared with the Shire of Noosa)
- Dulong
- Eerwah Vale
- Eudlo
- Eumundi
- Flaxton
- Forest Glen
- Gheerulla
- Highworth
- Hunchy
- Ilkley
- Image Flat
- Kenilworth
- Kiamba
- Kidaman Creek
- Kiels Mountain
- Kulangoor
- Kuluin
- Kunda Park
- Kureelpa
- Landers Shoot
- Mapleton
- Marcoola
- Maroochy River
- Maroochydore
- Mons
- Montville
- Mooloolaba
- Mount Coolum
- Mountain Creek
- Mudjimba
- Nambour
- Ninderry
- North Arm
- Obi Obi
- Pacific Paradise
- Palmwoods
- Parklands
- Peregian Beach
- Peregian Springs
- Perwillowen
- Point Arkwright
- Rosemount
- Sippy Downs
- Tanawha
- Towen Mountain
- Twin Waters
- Valdora
- Verrierdale
- West Woombye
- Weyba Downs
- Woombye
- Yandina Creek
- Yandina
- Yaroomba
