= Yandina–Coolum Road =

Road in Queensland, Australia

Yandina–Coolum Road Queensland

General information
- Type: Road
- Length: 18.5 km (11 mi)
- Route number(s): State Route 11

Major junctions
- West end: Yandina–Bli Bli Road and Yandina North Connection Road, Yandina
- Bruce Highway; Sunshine Motorway
- East end: David Low Way, Coolum Beach

Yandina–Coolum Road is a continuous 18.5-kilometre (11.5 mi) road route in the Sunshine Coast local government area of Queensland, Australia. The route is signed as State Route 11. It is a state-controlled district road (number 138), rated as a local road of regional significance (LRRS).

== Route description ==
The road starts at an intersection with Yandina–Bli Bli Road (known as Nambour Connection Road) and Yandina North Connection Road (Farrell Street) in Yandina. It runs east and north as Fleming Street to a roundabout intersection where it turns east as Yandina–Coolum Road before crossing over the Bruce Highway at a dumbbell intersection. It continues east as State Route 11 before entering the locality of Maroochy River, where it runs southeast and northeast before exiting. Next it turns north between the localities of Valdora and Yandina Creek, then northeast across Yandina Creek into Coolum Beach. Continuing northeast, east, and southeast, the road approaches the Sunshine Motorway, where it turns south parallel to the motorway. It crosses the motorway at a roundabout intersection and proceeds into the residential part of Coolum Beach. It runs southeast for a short distance and then northeast by east through the town to the David Low Way, where it ends at a T junction.

The road is fully sealed to at least a two lane standard.

== History ==
European settlement began in the Yandina district in the 1850s and the town was surveyed in 1870. Leases for three cattle runs were granted in 1853, and timber getting commenced in the late 1860s. The combined pastoral leases, "Canando" and "Yandina", comprised 100,000 acres (40,000 ha) extending from Yandina to Cooroy. In 1868 the "Yandina" run was made available for selection for closer settlement.

The first land selection in Coolum Beach was made in 1871, a pastoral lease of 225 hectares (560 acres). Freehold land was available from 1883 and the first permanent settler arrived in 1905. By 1912 there were 12 families living in the Coolum Beach district. The first trafficable road to Coolum Beach, from Yandina, was built from 1922 to 1925.

== Major intersections ==
All distances are from Google Maps. The entire road is within the Sunshine Coast local government area.

Location	km	mi	Destinations	Notes
Yandina	0	0.0	Yandina North Connection Road – north – Eumundi; Yandina–Bli Bli Road – south – Bli Bli; Old Gympie Road – northwest – Cooloolabin	Road starts as Fleming Street with no route number.
Yandina	0.8	0.50	Coulson Road – west – Yandina; Pioneer Road – north – Yandina	Road turns east as Yandina–Coolum Road
Yandina	1.3– 1.8	0.81– 1.1	Bruce Highway – north – Eumundi – south – Nambour	Road continues east as State Route 11.
Coolum Beach	16.4	10.2	Sunshine Motorway – north – Peregian Springs – south – Mount Coolum	Road continues east.
Coolum Beach	18.5	11.5	David Low Way – north – Peregian Beach – south – Point Arkwright	Eastern end of Yandina–Coolum Road
1.000 mi = 1.609 km; 1.000 km = 0.621 mi: Route transition

== See also ==
- List of numbered roads in Queensland
