= Weyba Downs, Queensland =

Weyba Downs
- Suburb
- Interactive map of Weyba Downs
- Coordinates: 26.4486°S 153.0458°E
- Country: Australia
- State: Queensland
- LGA: Sunshine Coast Region
- Location: 15.2 km (9.4 mi) NNW of Coolum Beach; 32.3 km (20.1 mi) NNE of Nambour; 52 km (32 mi) N of Caloundra; 143 km (89 mi) N of Brisbane

Government
  - State electorate: Ninderry
  - Federal division: Wide Bay

Area
  - Total: 6.1 km^{2} (2.4 sq mi)

Population
  - Total: 352 (2021 census)
  - Density: 57.7/km^{2} (149.5/sq mi)
- Time zone: UTC+10:00 (AEST)
- Postcode: 4562
Suburbs around Weyba Downs
Doonan	Noosaville	Noosaville
Doonan	Weyba Downs	Noosaville
Doonan	Peregian Beach	Peregian Beach

Weyba Downs is a rural locality in the Sunshine Coast Region, Queensland, Australia. In the 2021 census, Weyba Downs had a population of 352 people.

== Geography ==
Weyba Downs is on the Sunshine Coast. The locality is bounded to the north-west by Eumarella Road, to the west and south-west by Emu Mountain Arterial Road, and to the north-east by Lake Weyba, a tidal lake that flows into Noosa River and is within the locality of Noosaville.

Most of the south and west of the locality are one section of the Noosa National Park. Apart from the protected area, the land use in the north-east is rural residential housing and some grazing on native vegetation.

== History ==
Weyba is believed to mean "place of stingrays" in the local aboriginal language. Alternatively, it might mean or "place of flying squirrels".

Weyba Downs now covers the area previously known as Peregian Beach South.

== Demographics ==
In the 2016 census, Weyba Downs had a population of 296 people.

In the 2021 census, Weyba Downs had a population of 352 people.

== Education ==
There are no schools in Weyba Downs. The nearest government primary school is Noosaville State School in neighbouring Noosaville to the north. The nearest government secondary school is Coolum State High School in Coolum Beach to the south-east.

== Attractions ==
The Lake Weyba Foreshore Walk commences at the northern end of Lake Weyba Drive and follows the lake shore south to neighbouring Peregian Beach. The walk is suitable for pedestrians and horses. To traverse the full walk, somesome wading across creeks may be required.
