= Yaroomba, Queensland =

Yaroomba
- Suburb
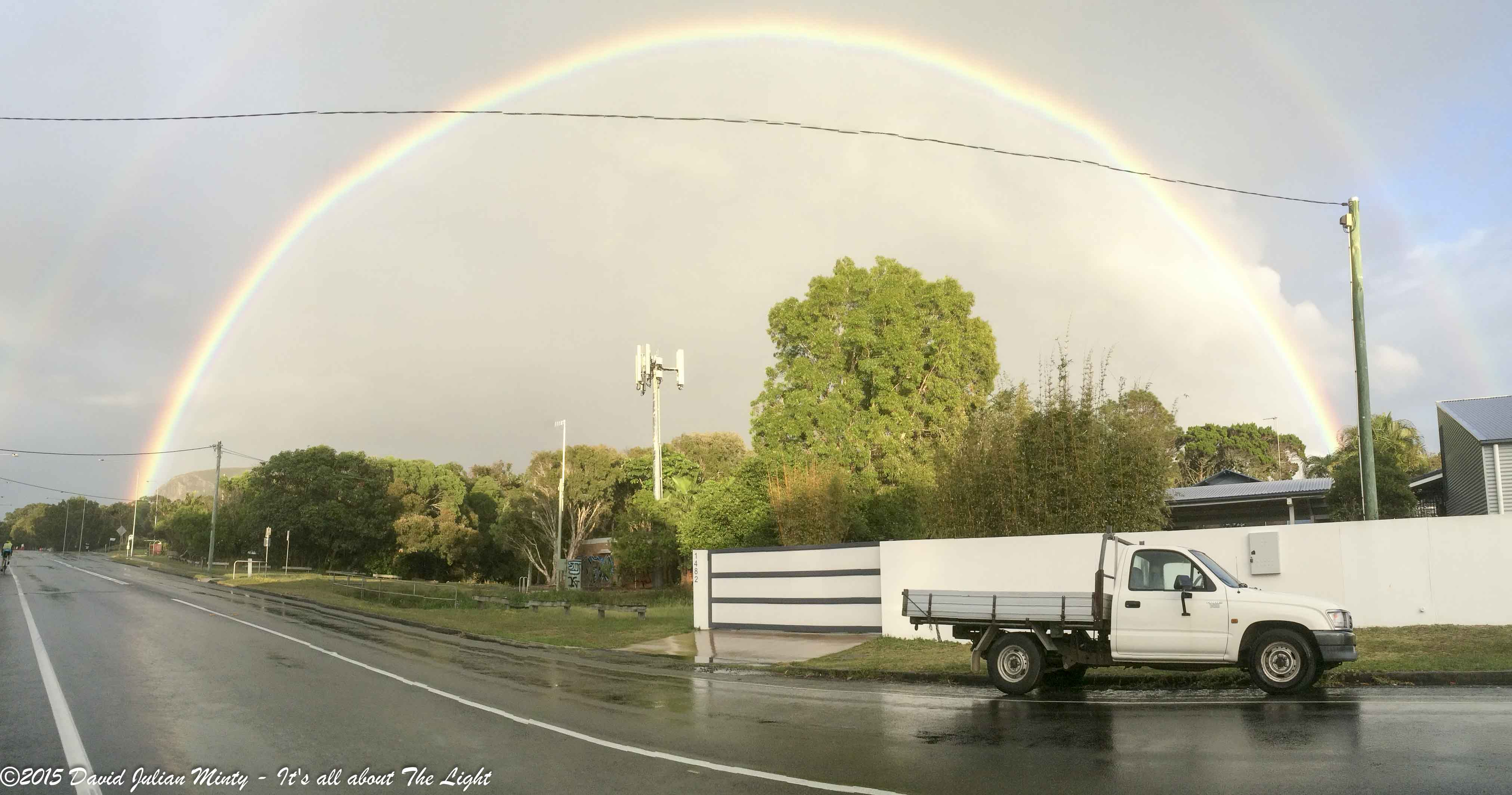
- Double Rainbow over Coolum David Low Way, 2015

- Interactive map of Yaroomba
- Coordinates: 26.5525°S 153.0927°E
- Country: Australia
- State: Queensland
- City: Sunshine Coast
- LGA: Sunshine Coast Region
- Location: 3.1 km (1.9 mi) S of Coolum Beach; 16.3 km (10.1 mi) N of Maroochydore; 23.5 km (14.6 mi) NE of Nambour; 35.3 km (21.9 mi) N of Caloundra; 116 km (72 mi) N of Brisbane
- Established: 1953

Government
  - State electorates: Maroochydore; Ninderry
  - Federal division: Fairfax

Area
  - Total: 2.6 km^{2} (1.0 sq mi)
- Elevation: 12 m (39 ft)

Population
  - Total: 2,043 (2021 census)
  - Density: 786/km^{2} (2,040/sq mi)
- Time zone: UTC+10:00 (AEST)
- Postcode: 4573
Suburbs around Yaroomba
Coolum Beach	Coolum Beach	Point Arkwright
Coolum Beach	Yaroomba	Coral Sea
Mount Coolum	Mount Coolum	Coral Sea

Yaroomba is a coastal suburb in the Sunshine Coast Region, Queensland, Australia. In the 2021 census, Yaroomba had a population of 2,043 people.

== Geography ==
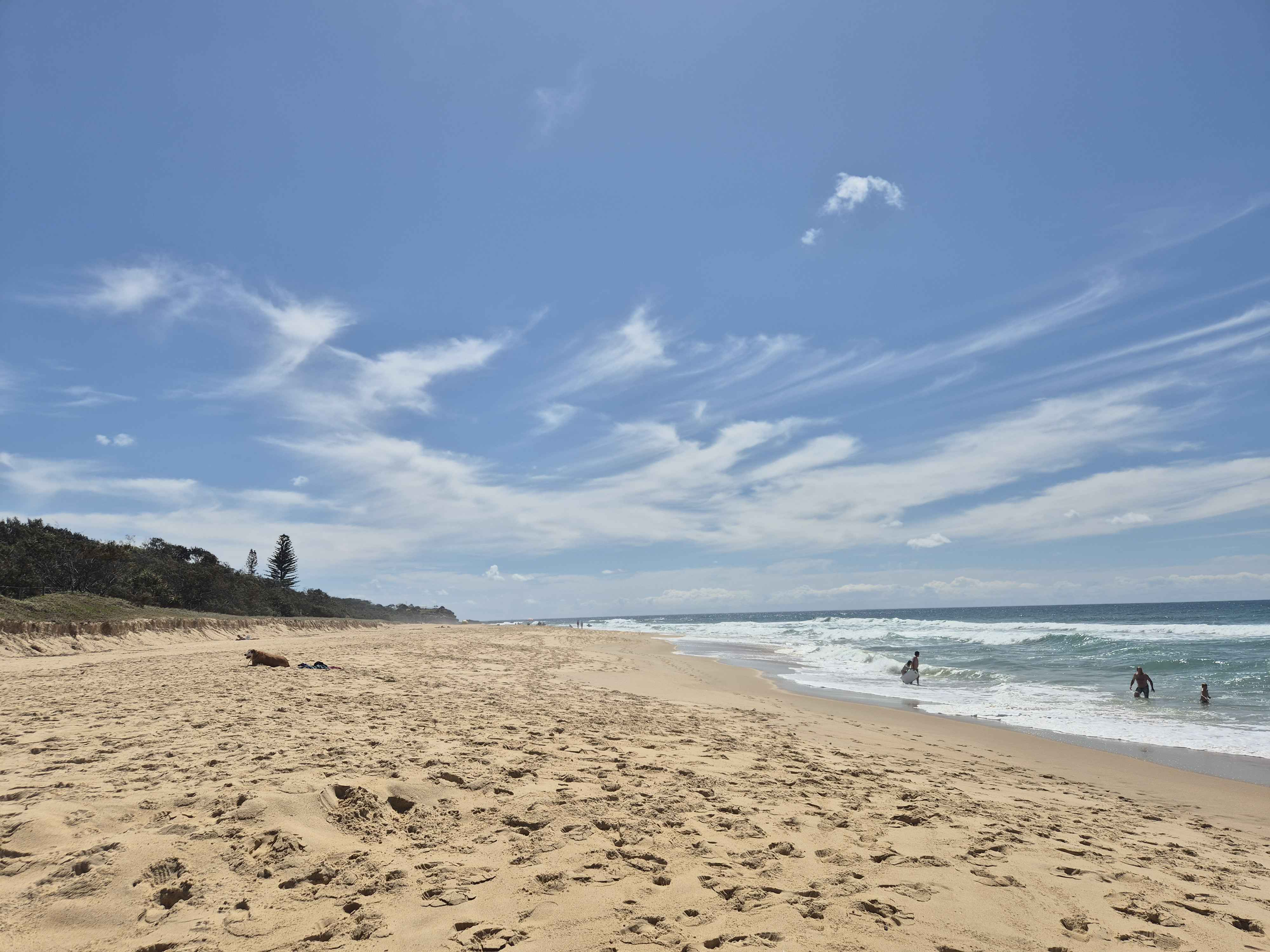
Yaroomba Beach, Queensland

The eastern boundary of the suburb is the Coral Sea, featuring a long strip of sand called Yaroomba Beach (26.5574°S 153.1002°E).

The land rises from sea level in the east to approximately 40 metres (130 ft) in the west. The Palmer Coolum Resort and Golf Course occupies about half the suburb, 150 hectares (370 acres). The remainder is residential housing.

The David Low Way traverses the suburb from north-east to south-east.

== History ==
The suburb began life as a housing estate named Coronation Beach in 1953 in honour of the coronation of Queen Elizabeth II. The name was changed to Yaroomba, a Kabi word which means "surf on the beach", in 1961.

In 2007, a 200-kilogram (440 lb) piece of hardwood ribbing was found on the beach by Scott Patterson. It was uncovered due to a combination of high tides and rushing creek waters from recent heavy rain. It was part of the shipwrecked Kirkdale. The ship was built in Whitby, England, and was a twin-masted 251-tonne (277-ton) sailing ship about 30 metres (98 ft) long. It left Launceston in May 1862 bound for Colombo in Ceylon (now Sri Lanka) via the Torres Strait; however, after arriving at Cooktown, the captain turned and travelled south again and ran aground off Yaroomba Beach on 19 July 1862. The ship caught fire but the captain and crew members were able to launch a boat and survived.

== Demographics ==
In the 2016 census, Yaroomba had a population of 1,623 people.

In the 2021 census, Yaroomba had a population of 2,043 people.

== Education ==
There are no schools in Yaroomba. The nearest government primary and secondary schools are Coolum State School and Coolum State High School, both in neighbouring Coolum Beach.

The closest public library is in Coolum.

== Amenities ==
There are a number of parks in the suburb:

- Bimini Dr Park (26.5443°S 153.0876°E)
- Birrahl Park (26.5537°S 153.0998°E)
- Diamond Close Natural Amenity Reserve (26.5431°S 153.0895°E)
- Donegal Drive Environmental Reserve (26.5439°S 153.0919°E)
- Marcoola -Yaroomba Foreshore Bushland Conservation Reserve (26.5670°S 153.0982°E)
- Meadowlands Park (26.5447°S 153.0860°E)
- Opel Pl Drainage E/ment (26.5433°S 153.0881°E)
- Warran Road Natural Amenity Reserve (26.5466°S 153.0910°E)
- Yaroomba Bushland 1 Park (26.5508°S 153.0954°E)
- Yaroomba Bushland 2 Park (26.5477°S 153.0967°E)
- Yaroomba Bushland Park Bushland Conservation Reserve (26.5497°S 153.0958°E)
