= Doonan, Queensland =

Doonan
- Suburb
- Coordinates: 26.442°S 153.011°E
- Country: Australia
- State: Queensland
- City: Sunshine Coast
- LGAs: Sunshine Coast Region; Shire of Noosa
- Location: 9.7 km (6.0 mi) S of Tewantin; 26.9 km (16.7 mi) NNE of Nambour; 51.1 km (31.8 mi) N of Caloundra; 126 km (78 mi) N of Brisbane

Government
  - State electorates: Ninderry; Noosa
  - Federal division: Wide Bay

Area
  - Total: 31.5 km^{2} (12.2 sq mi)

Population
  - Total: 3,727 (2021 census)
  - Density: 118.32/km^{2} (306.4/sq mi)
- Time zone: UTC+10:00 (AEST)
- Postcode: 4562
Suburbs around Doonan
| Tinbeerwah | Tewantin | Noosaville |
| Eumundi | Doonan | Weyba Downs |
| Verrierdale | Verrierdale | Peregian Beach; Peregian Springs |

Doonan is a rural residential locality split between the Sunshine Coast Region and the Shire of Noosa, both in Queensland, Australia. In the 2021 census, Doonan had a population of 3,727 people.

== Geography ==
The northern part is within the local government area of Shire of Noosa and the southern part is within Sunshine Coast Region; between 2008 and 2013 it was entirely within Sunshine Coast Region.

Lone Tree Hill is on the western edge of the locality (26.4396°S 152.9750°E), rising to 210 metres (690 ft) above sea level.

Mitchell Hill is in the west of the locality (26.4389°S 152.9853°E) rising to 140 metres (460 ft) above sea level. It was named after brothers Harold (1890-1966) and Allan Mitchell, who farmed the area from the Noosa Valley Golf Club through to Sunrise Road. The brothers served in the 5th Light Horse in the Middle East during World War I.

The Eumundi-Noosa Road runs through from south-west to north.

== History ==
The name is believed to come from the Aboriginal word for leaf. The name is known to be of Irish descent, named by the settlers in the Bowden clan. Said to mean place of trees and hills.

From the 19th to 20th centuries, Doonan was settled by groups of agropastoralists with 359 acres of land and pastoral activities continued until the 1990s. There was a proposal for a link of its railway line from Eumundi to Tewantin, however the project was abandoned due to the outbreak of World War I.

Doonan Provisional School opened on 2 April 1919, with official opening performed on 9 April 1919 by Harry Walker and Richard Warren, both Members of the Queensland Legislative Assembly. In 1920 it became Doonan State School. It closed in 1954. It was at 813 Eumundi Noosa Road (26.4545°S 153.0126°E).

Doonan Lower State School opened in 1924 and closed circa 1931.

The Doonan venue opened in 1990 and operated as a traditional German restaurant until its closure in 2006. The Comiskey Group acquired the two-hectare site in 2006 and opened a new venue on 2 March 2023.

Noosa Pengari Steiner School opened in 1996.

Between 2008 and 2013, the whole of Doonan (and the rest of the Shire of Noosa) was within Sunshine Coast Region.

== Demographics ==
In the 2016 census, Doonan had a population of 3,459 people.

In the 2021 census, Doonan had a population of 3,727 people.

== Education ==
Noosa Pengari Steiner School is a private primary and secondary (Prep-12) school for boys and girls at 86 Nyell Road (26.4521°S 153.0306°E). In 2018, the school had an enrolment of 298 students with 21 teachers (19 full-time equivalent) and 20 non-teaching staff (14 full-time equivalent).

There are no government schools in Doonan. The nearest government primary schools are Eumundi State School in neighbouring Eumundi to the west and the Noosaville State School in neighbouring Noosaville to the north-east. The nearest government secondary schools are Coolum State High School in Coolum Beach to the south-east, Sunshine Beach State High School in Sunshine Beach to the north-east, and Noosa District State High School in Cooroy/Pomona to the north-west.

== Facilities ==
RSPCA Noosa is an animal shelter on the corner Hollett Raoad and West Eumundi Road (26.4277°S 153.0285°E).
