= Valdora, Queensland =

Valdora
- Suburb
- Interactive map of Valdora
- Coordinates: 26.5486°S 153.0011°E
- Country: Australia
- State: Queensland
- City: Sunshine Coast
- LGA: Sunshine Coast Region
- Location: 13.7 km (8.5 mi) SW of Coolum Beach; 17.1 km (10.6 mi) NE of Nambour; 43.9 km (27.3 mi) NNW of Caloundra; 126 km (78 mi) N of Brisbane

Government
  - State electorate: Ninderry
  - Federal division: Fairfax

Area
  - Total: 10.1 km^{2} (3.9 sq mi)

Population
  - Total: 776 (2021 census)
  - Density: 76.8/km^{2} (199.0/sq mi)
- Time zone: UTC+10:00 (AEST)
- Postcode: 4561
Suburbs around Valdora
North Arm	Yandina Creek	Yandina Creek
Ninderry	Valdora	Yandina Creek
Maroochy River	Maroochy River	Maroochy River

Valdora is a rural locality in the Sunshine Coast Region, Queensland, Australia. In the 2021 census, Valdora had a population of 776 people. The name Valdora comes from Val d'Ora, which means Golden Valley.

== Geography ==
The Yandina-Coolum Road runs along the eastern boundary.

== History ==
Golden Valley State School opened on 27 August 1918. On 1 July 1940, it was renamed Valdora State School. It was at Valdora Road (26.5472°S 153.0049°E). In 1949, the school building was moved to a new location in neighbouring Yandina Creek and re-opened on 1 February 1949 as Yandina Creek State School, which closed on 7 August 1964.

The Sunshine Coast Solar Farm commenced operating in July 2017. It is the first solar farm in Australia built by a local government.

== Demographics ==
In the 2016 census, Valdora had a population of 532 people.

In the 2021 census, Valdora had a population of 776 people.

== Education ==
There are no schools in Valdora. The nearest government primary schools are North Arm State School in neighbouring North Arm to the north-west, Coolum State School in Coolum Beach to the east, and Yandina State School in Yandina to the south-west. The nearest government secondary schools are Nambour State College in Nambour to the south and Coolum State High School in Coolum Beach.

== Facilities ==
Sunshine Coast Solar Farm is at 909 Yandina Coolum Road (26.5601°S 153.0257°E). It is operated by the Sunshine Coast Regional Council. The 15 megawatt (MW) fixed tilt solar farm is able to fully offset the council's electricity use.

Valdora-Yandina Creek Rural Fire Station is at 269 Valdora Road (26.5498°S 153.0073°E).
