= Mount Coolum, Queensland =

Mount Coolum
- Suburb
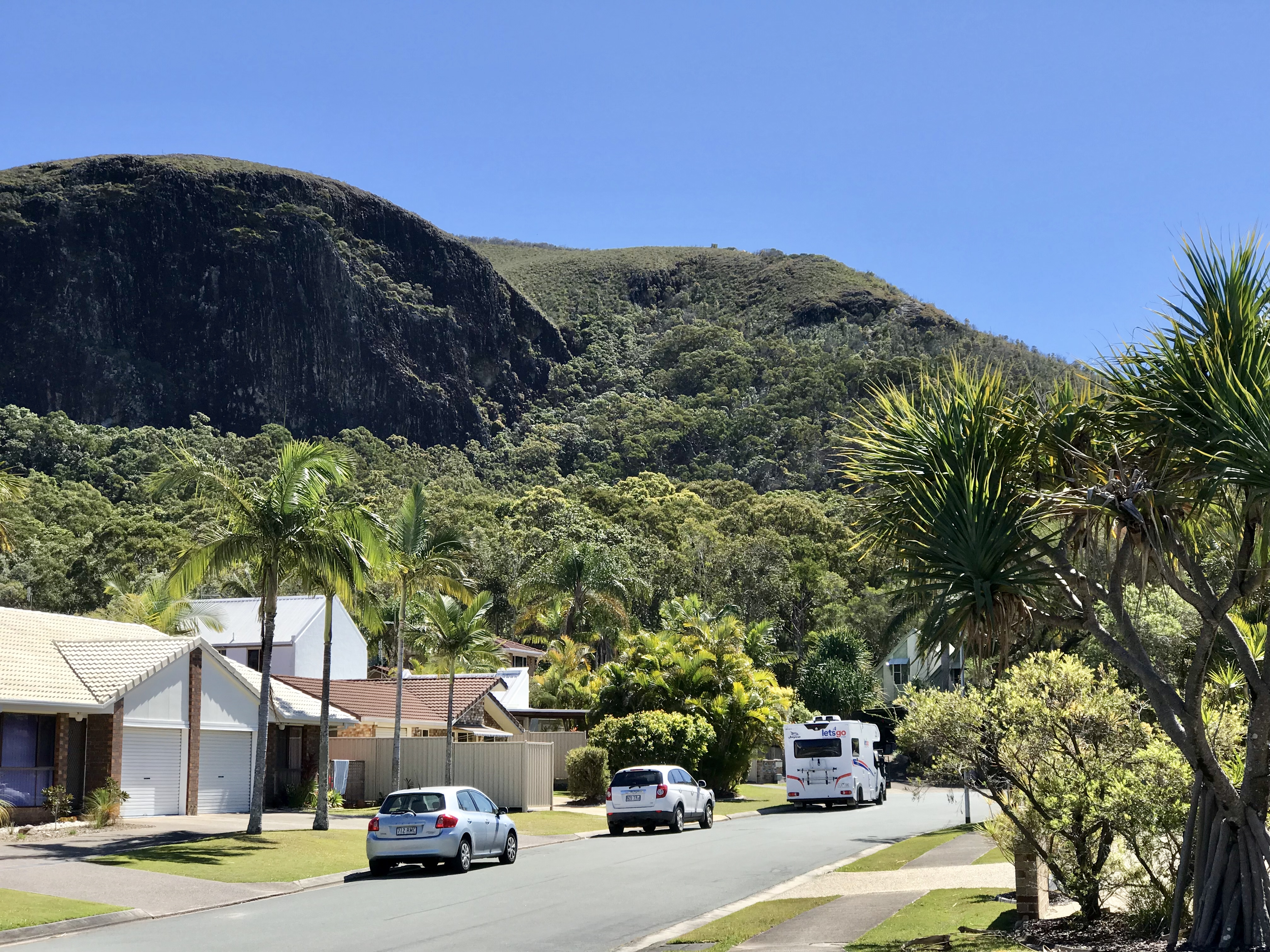
- Suburban street with the mountain behind, 2018

- Interactive map of Mount Coolum
- Coordinates: 26.5661°S 153.0827°E
- Country: Australia
- State: Queensland
- City: Sunshine Coast
- LGA: Sunshine Coast Region
- Location: 17.2 km (10.7 mi) N of Maroochydore; 22.2 km (13.8 mi) NE of Nambour; 115 km (71 mi) N of Brisbane

Government
  - State electorates: Maroochydore; Ninderry
  - Federal division: Fairfax

Area
  - Total: 5.1 km^{2} (2.0 sq mi)

Population
  - Total: 4,545 (2021 census)
  - Density: 891/km^{2} (2,308/sq mi)
- Time zone: UTC+10:00 (AEST)
- Postcode: 4573
Suburbs around Mount Coolum
| Coolum Beach | Yaroomba | Yaroomba |
| Maroochy River | Mount Coolum | Coral Sea |
| Marcoola | Marcoola | Marcoola |

Mount Coolum is a coastal suburb in the Sunshine Coast Region, Queensland, Australia. In the 2021 census, Mount Coolum had a population of 4,545 people.

== Geography ==
The Sunshine Motorway passes through the locality from the north-west (Coolum Beach) to the south-west (Marcoola). The David Low Way passes through the locality from north-east (Yaroomba) to south-east (Marcoola).

The mountain Mount Coolum (from which the suburb takes its name) is in the centre of the locality (26.5615°S 153.0841°E). Historically the mountain was known as Half Way Lump. It is 207 metres (679 ft) above sea level. The mountain is protected within the Mount Coolum National Park.

There is a sandy beach along the Coral Sea coast.

== History ==
The name Coolum derives from Kabi word gulum or kulum meaning without or wanting, probably referring to the Aboriginal legend of the mountain's head being knocked off in a fight with Ninderry, with the head becoming Mudjimba Island (26.6147°S 153.1147°E).

== Demographics ==
In the 2016 census, Mount Coolum had a population of 4,265 people.

In the 2021 census, Mount Coolum had a population of 4,545 people.

== Amenities ==
The Sunshine Coast Regional Council operates a mobile library service which visits Suncoast Beach Drive.

== Education ==
There are no schools in Mount Coolum. The nearest government primary school is Coolum State School in neighbouring Coolum Beach. The nearest government secondary school is Coolum State High School, also in Coolum Beach.
