= Point Arkwright, Queensland =

Point Arkwright
- Suburb
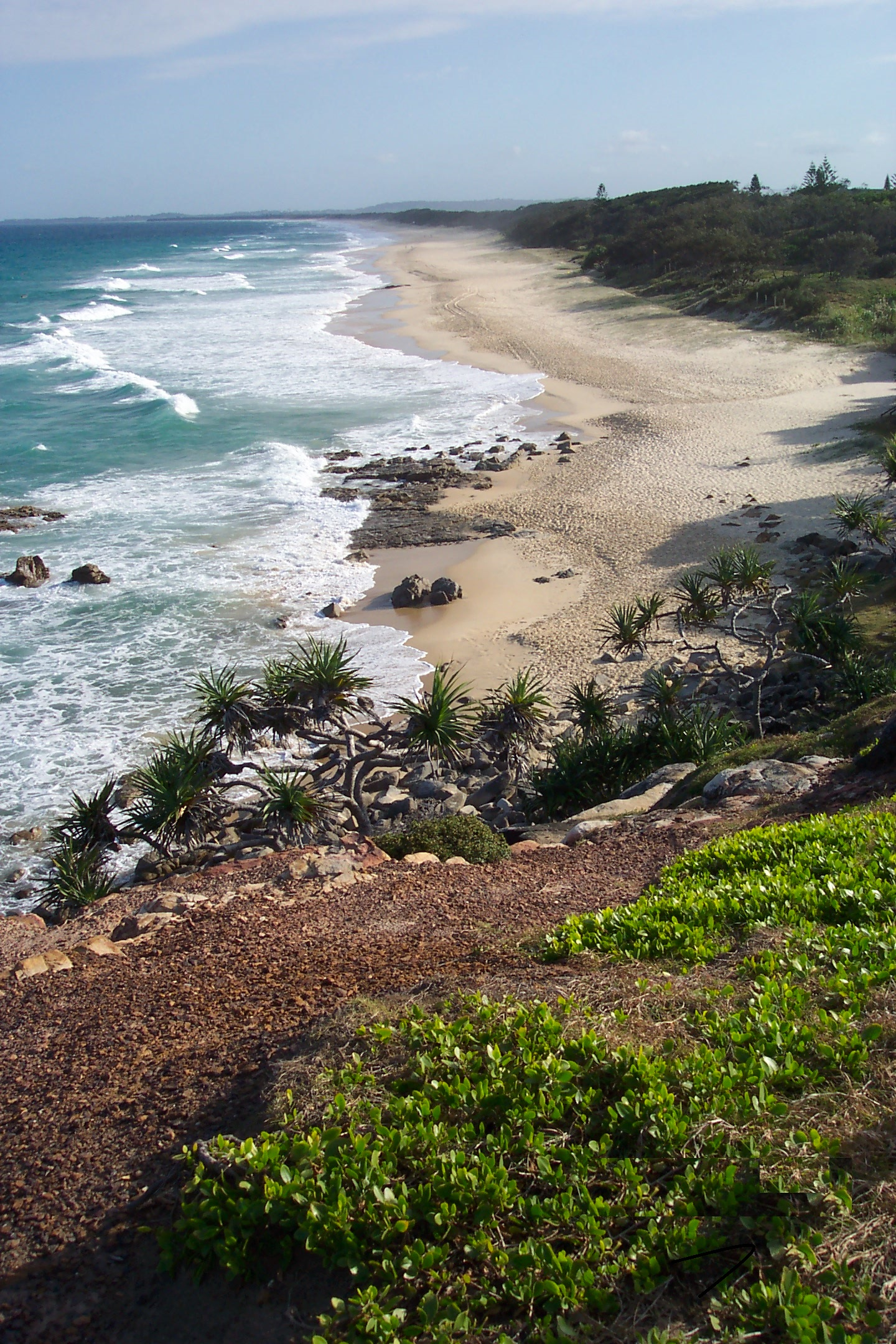
- Looking south from Point Arkwright, 2003

- Interactive map of Point Arkwright
- Coordinates: 26.5486°S 153.1011°E
- Country: Australia
- State: Queensland
- City: Sunshine Coast
- LGA: Sunshine Coast Region
- Location: 17.5 km (10.9 mi) N of Maroochydore; 24.3 km (15.1 mi) NE of Nambour; 36.1 km (22.4 mi) N of Caloundra; 126 km (78 mi) N of Brisbane

Government
  - State electorate: Maroochydore
  - Federal division: Fairfax

Area
  - Total: 0.4 km^{2} (0.15 sq mi)

Population
  - Total: 309 (2021 census)
  - Density: 770/km^{2} (2,000/sq mi)
- Time zone: UTC+10:00 (AEST)
- Postcode: 4573
Suburbs around Point Arkwright
Coolum Beach	Coolum Beach	Coral Sea
Yaroomba	Point Arkwright	Coral Sea
Yaroomba	Yaroomba	Coral Sea

Point Arkwright is a coastal suburb in the Sunshine Coast Region, Queensland, Australia. In the 2021 census, Point Arkwright had a population of 309 people.

== Geography ==
The suburb takes its name from the headland Point Arkwright, the most easterly part of the suburb (26.5466°S 153.1029°E).

The David Low Way enters the locality from the south (Yaroomba) and exits to the north (Coolum Beach).

The land use is a mixture of suburban housing and parkland.

== History ==
The headland Point Arkwright was originally called Petrie Heads after the first settler of Brisbane Andrew Petrie who had explored this region of Southern Queensland in the early 1840s.

The headland being named as Point Arkwright would appear to post-date 1861 as that is the year that Lt. Heath RN named the associated headland of Point Cartwright as Point Raper. As both Point Cartwright and Point Arkwright are thought to have been named together in recognition of the English inventors, it would have to have been some time after 1861 when Point Raper was being used for Point Cartwright. The Point Arkwright name is believed to be named after Sir Richard Arkwright, who invented the machinery for cotton spinning factories. It is not known who bestowed the Point Arkwright name as it was obviously intended to be grouped with Point Cartwright, which was named after Edmund Cartwright who developed weaving and combing equipment which complement Arkwright's inventions. The name Point Arkwright was in use from at least 1864.

== Demographics ==
In the 2016 census, Point Arkwright had a population of 273 people.

In the 2021 census, Point Arkwright had a population of 309 people.

== Education ==
There are no schools in Point Arkwright. The nearest government primary school is Coolum State School in Coolum Beach. The nearest government secondary school is Coolum State High School also in Coolum Beach.

Coolum Beach Christian College is in Yandina Creek, located 10 minutes from Coolum Beach.

== Amenities ==
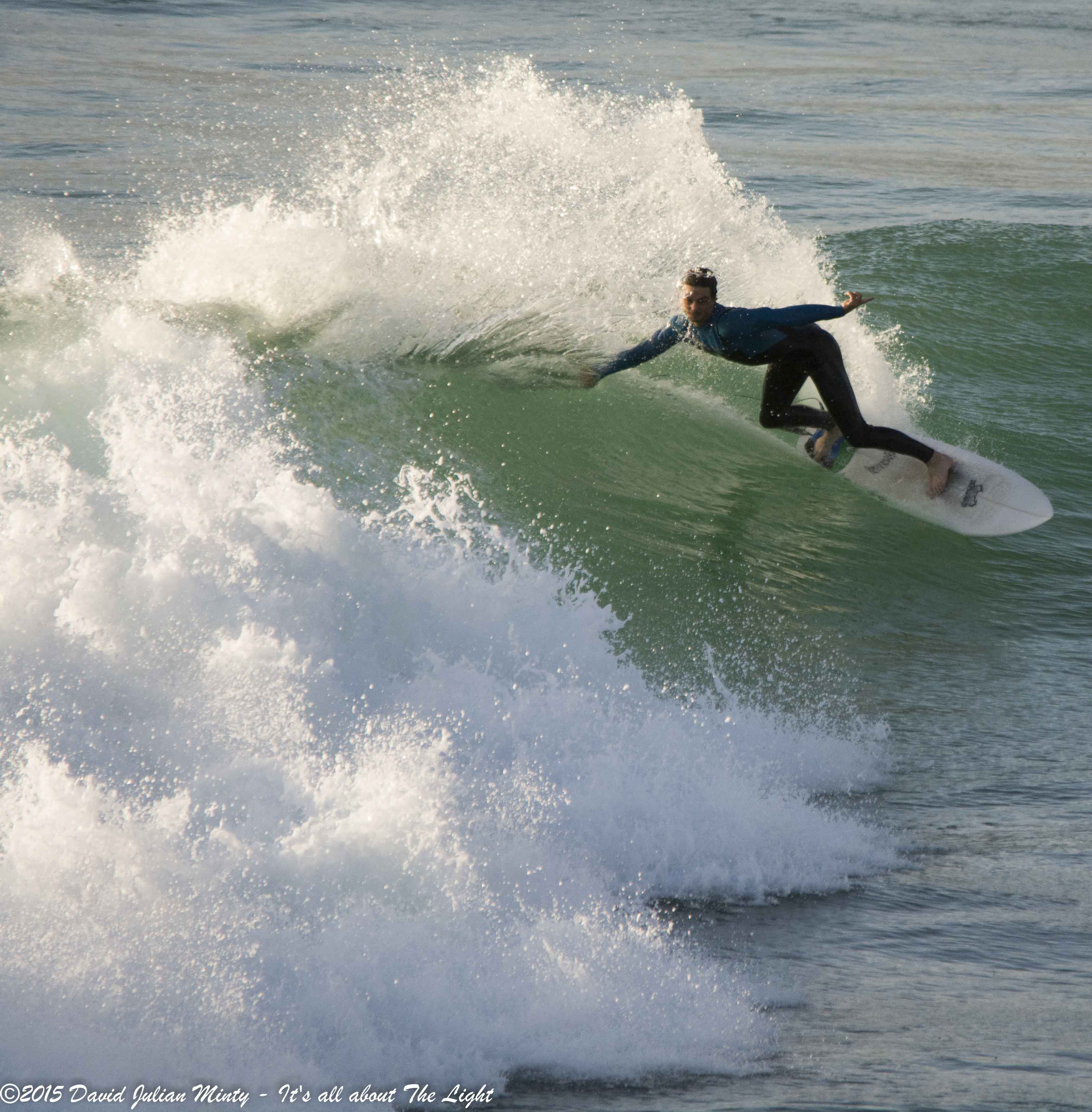
Surfing at Point Arkwright, 2015

Point Arkwright is the location of Luther Heights Youth Camp (26.5446°S 153.0975°E), used by the Lutheran Youth of Queensland for their Christian Life Week Camps. It is a 37-acre (15 ha) site with 338 beds.

There are a number of parks in the area:

- Andrew St Park (26.5474°S 153.1013°E)
- David Low Way Bushland Conservation Reserve (26.5481°S 153.0992°E)
- Marcoola -Yaroomba Foreshore Bushland Conservation Reserve (26.5670°S 153.0982°E)
- Point Arkwright Headlands Park (26.5466°S 153.1020°E)
- Yaroomba - Coolum Foreshore Bushland Conservation Reserve (26.5420°S 153.0980°E)
- Yinneburra Bushland Conservation Reserve (26.5482°S 153.1012°E)
