= Essena O'Neill =

Internet celebrity from Coolum, Australia

Essena O'Neill (born 3 November 1996) is a former internet celebrity from Coolum Beach, Queensland, Australia, who made national and international headlines when quitting social media in 2015.

== Social media ==
In late October 2015, then eighteen-year-old model and vegan advocate Essena O'Neill deleted over 2,000 photos on her Instagram that had over 600,000 followers. She renamed the account "Social Media Is Not Real Life" and rewrote captions for old posts. She also decided to quit all other social media accounts, including Tumblr and Snapchat. After going viral, O'Neill gained more followers on Instagram, peaking at around 1 million followers before deleting it.

In her book, American Girls: Social Media and the Secret Lives of Teenagers, Nancy Jo Sales writes, "O'Neill did a powerful thing: she'd said what many people were already thinking, or had thought at some point as they posted another selfie or edited picture that made their life seem more perfect and glamorous than it actually was."

O'Neill said that when she quit social media she had several projects planned, after having performed sponsored posts and received payments from YouTube.

=== Response ===
In the first few days following her announcement, O'Neill's decision was shared widely on the internet. O'Neill received praise while also being criticised for eliciting "confusion" amongst her following.

After her announcement, she decided to launch a website called "Let's Be Game Changers", meant to "inform people". In the site, she posted videos questioning social media and encouraging followers to think about the way they use social media. The site also featured a section called "behind the image", which served to shed light on the details and preparation behind her previous images posted to her Instagram account.

Among those who criticized her were fellow Instagram users Nina and Randa Nelson. The twins produced a video titled "Essena O'Neill Quitting Social Media Is a Hoax", which questioned her claims. The twins said Let's Be Game Changers was in fact "100-percent self promotion". In a forum post on her site, she stated that she would not engage with the accusations.

O'Neill started using Vimeo as the only platform to communicate publicly.

O'Neill took down Let's Be Game Changers in December 2015 because being online "felt toxic", followed by an email newsletter sent to her followers. Around this same time, Let's Be Game Changers redirected to a blank site with her name on it. She then announced that she would be writing a satirical book called How to Be Social Media Famous.
