= Verrierdale, Queensland =

Verrierdale
- Suburb
- Interactive map of Verrierdale
- Coordinates: 26.4883°S 153.0188°E
- Country: Australia
- State: Queensland
- City: Sunshine Coast
- LGA: Sunshine Coast Region
- Location: 26.1 km (16.2 mi) NNE of Nambour; 30.7 km (19.1 mi) NNW of Maroochydore; 49.7 km (30.9 mi) N of Caloundra; 137 km (85 mi) N of Brisbane

Government
  - State electorate: Ninderry
  - Federal division: Fairfax

Area
  - Total: 29.6 km^{2} (11.4 sq mi)

Population
  - Total: 809 (2021 census)
  - Density: 27.33/km^{2} (70.79/sq mi)
- Time zone: UTC+10:00 (AEST)
- Postcode: 4562
Suburbs around Verrierdale
Eumundi	Doonan	Doonan
Eumundi	Verrierdale	Peregian Springs
North Arm	Yandina Creek	Coolum Beach

Verrierdale is a rural locality in the Sunshine Coast Region, Queensland, Australia. In the 2021 census, Verrierdale had a population of 809 people.

== Geography ==
Verrierdale is located in the Sunshine Coast hinterland, between Eumundi and the residential estate Peregian Springs. The Eumundi-Noosa Road runs through the north-west corner.

Eumundi Conservation Park is in the south-west of the locality. The north-east of the locality is mostly used for growing crops. The remainder of the locality is mixture of rural residential housing and grazing on native vegetation.

== History ==
Verrierdale is thought to have been named after for David George Verrier, an early settler who selected land in the area c. 1908.

Verrierdale State School opened on 14 August 1916 and closed on 31 December 1963. It was at 2 Pryor Road (26.4847°S 152.9932°E).

== Demographics ==
In the 2016 census, Verrierdale had a population of 775 people.

In the 2021 census, Verrierdale had a population of 809 people.

== Education ==
There are no schools in Verrierdale. The nearest government primary schools are Peregian Springs State School in neighbouring Peregian Springs to the east, Eumundi State School in neighbouring Eumundi to the west, and North Arm State School in neighbouring North Arm to the south-west. The nearest government secondary schools are Coolum State High School in neighbouring Coolum Beach to the east and Noosa District State High School, which has its junior campus in Pomona and its senior campus in Cooroy, both to the north-west.

== Amenities ==
Verrierdale Hall is at 460 Verrierdale Road (26.4835°S 152.9989°E).

Verrierdale Rural Fire Brigade is at 478 Verrierdale Road (26.48401°S 152.99818°E).
