= Maroochy River, Queensland =

Maroochy River
- Suburb
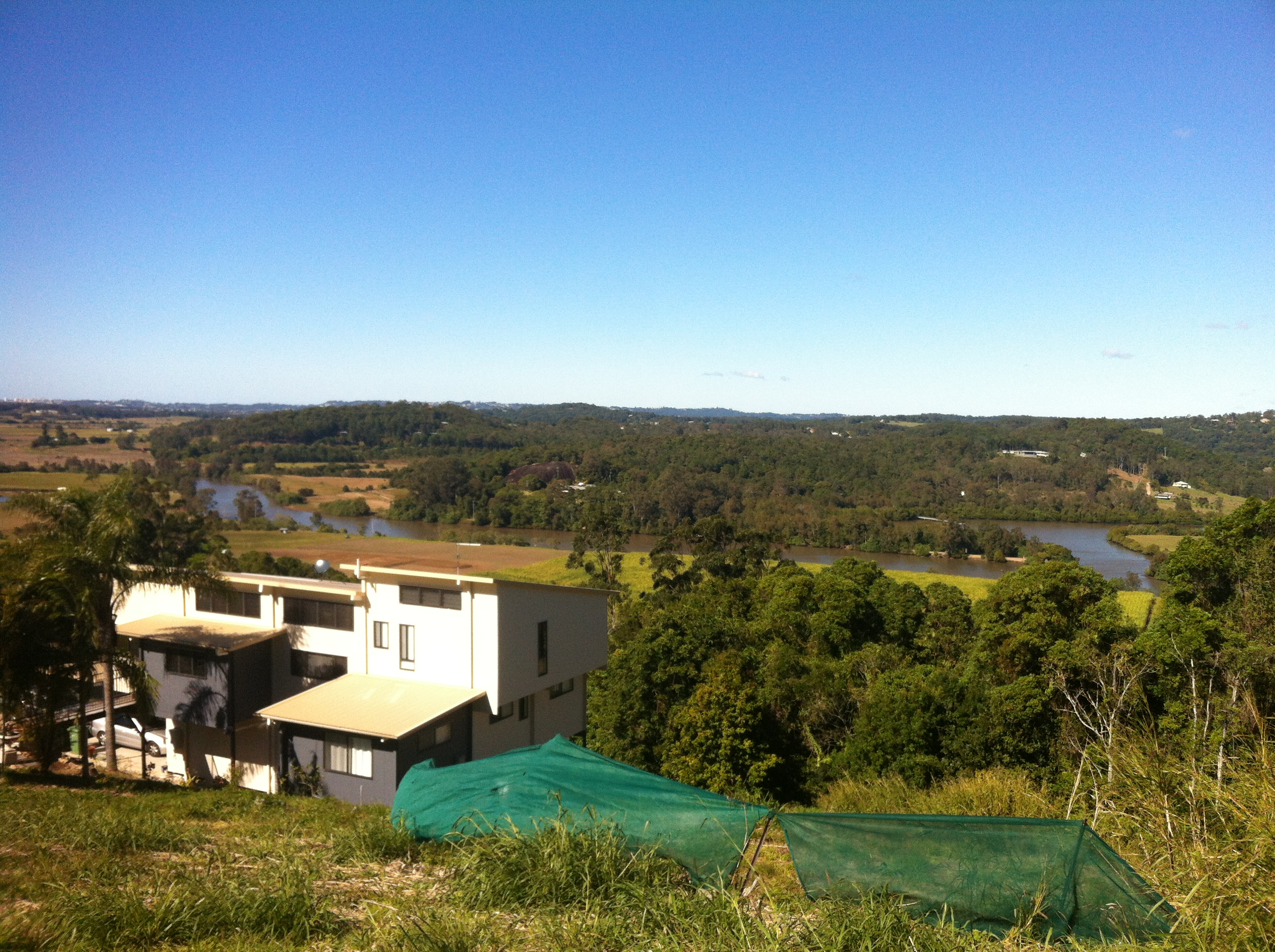
- View from slopes of Mount Ninderry towards the Maroochy River, 2012

- Interactive map of Maroochy River
- Coordinates: 26.5819°S 153.0177°E
- Country: Australia
- State: Queensland
- LGA: Sunshine Coast Region
- Location: 7.2 km (4.5 mi) E of Yandina; 15.6 km (9.7 mi) NE of Nambour; 42.2 km (26.2 mi) NNW of Caloundra; 123 km (76 mi) N of Brisbane

Government
  - State electorate: Ninderry
  - Federal division: Fairfax

Area
  - Total: 25.9 km^{2} (10.0 sq mi)

Population
  - Total: 1,667 (2021 census)
  - Density: 64.36/km^{2} (166.7/sq mi)
- Time zone: UTC+10:00 (AEST)
- Postcode: 4561
Suburbs around Maroochy River
Ninderry	Valdora; Yandina Creek	Coolum Beach
Yandina	Maroochy River	Mount Coolum
Parklands	Bli Bli	Marcoola

Maroochy River is a rural hinterland locality in the Sunshine Coast Region, Queensland, Australia. In the 2021 census, Maroochy River had a population of 1,667 people.

== Geography ==
The Maroochy River meanders from west to east through the locality. The surrounding river flats are cleared and primarily used for farming. The hillsides in the north-west and south-east of the locality are primarily used for residential purposes and retain natural bushland. Coolum Creek forms the eastern boundary of the locality.

The Yandina-Coolum Road and the Yandina-Bli Bli Road both enter from the west, exiting to north and south respectively.

== History ==
The name Maroochy is either a Yugarabul name collected by Andrew Petrie when he explored Wide Bay in 1842 or from Kabi word muru-kutchi meaning red bill referring to the black swan.

Maroochy River State School opened on 27 June 1911. It closed on 31 December 1972. The school was at 4 Lake Dunethin Road (26.5785°S 153.0109°E). The site is now occupied by the Dunethin Rock Scout campground.

== Demographics ==
In the 2011 census, Maroochy River had a population of 1,337 people.

In the 2016 census, Maroochy River had a population of 1,531 people.

In the 2021 census, Maroochy River had a population of 1,667 people.

== Heritage listings ==
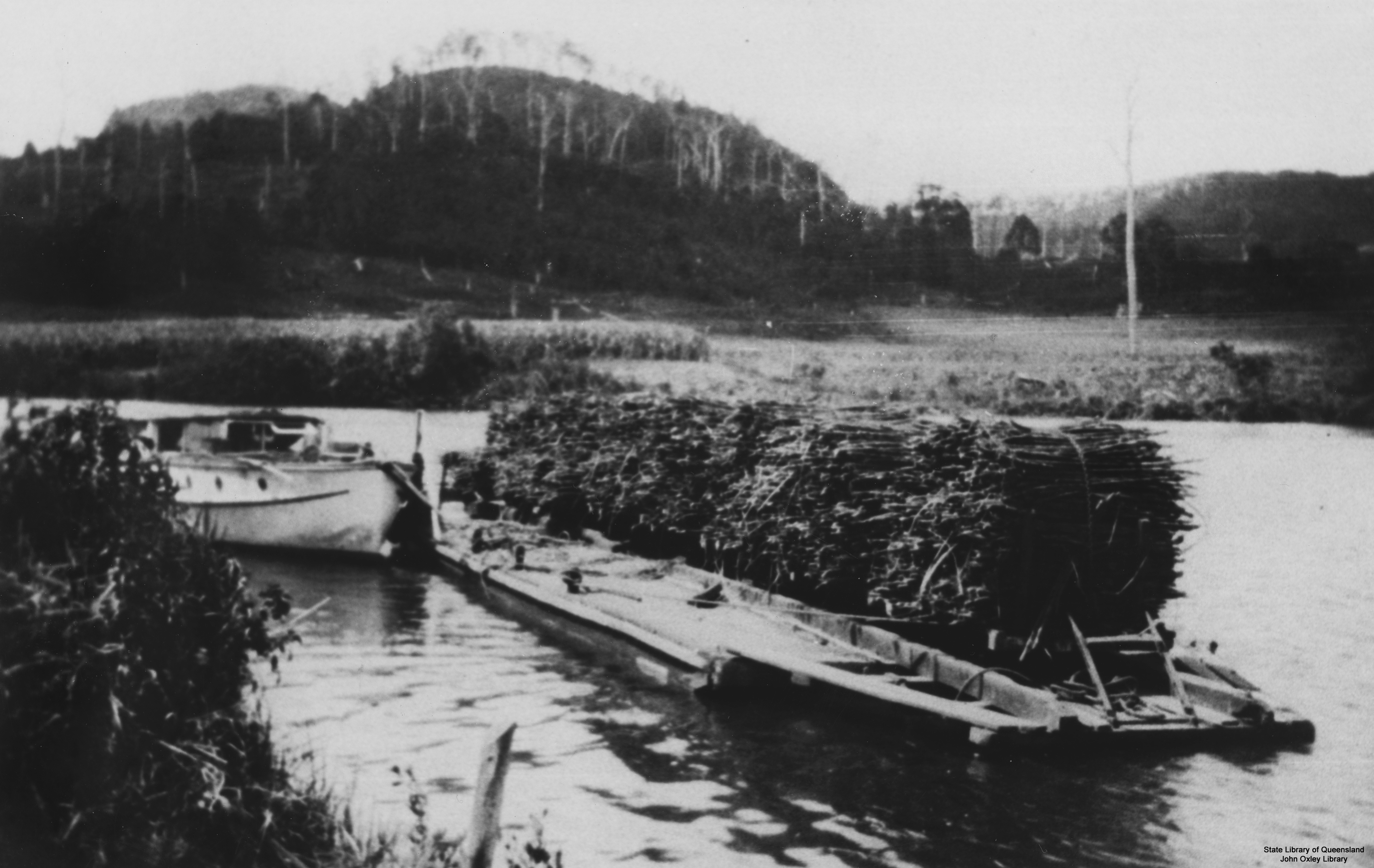
River barge transporting rakes of cut sugar cane at Dunethin Rock, 1920s

Maroochy River has a number of heritage-listed sites, including:

- Dunethin Rock, Dunethin Rock Road
- Tramway Lift Bridge over Maroochy River, Store Road

== Education ==
There are no schools in the locality. The nearest government primary schools are Yandina State School in neighbouring Yandina to the west and Bli Bli State School in neighbouring Bli Bli to the south. The nearest government secondary schools are Nambour State High School in Nambour to the south-west and Coolum State High School in Coolum Beach to the north-east.

== Amenities ==
There are a number of parks in the area, including:

- 2nd/14th Battalion Park (26.5551°S 152.9903°E)
- Callicoma Place Natural Amenity Reserve (26.5881°S 153.0140°E)
- Coolum Creek Environmental Reserve (17.7246°S 102.0755°E)
- Coolum Creek North Conservation Area (17.7014°S 101.9841°E)
- Dunethin Rock Bushland Reserve Network (17.7239°S 102.0086°E)
- Dunethin Rock Recreation Area (26.5764°S 153.0105°E)
- Maroochy River Esplanade – River Road (17.7146°S 102.0351°E)
- Mount Ninderry Bushland Conservation Reserve (17.7055°S 102.0057°E)
