= St George's Anglican Church, Eumundi =

Church building in Queensland, Australia

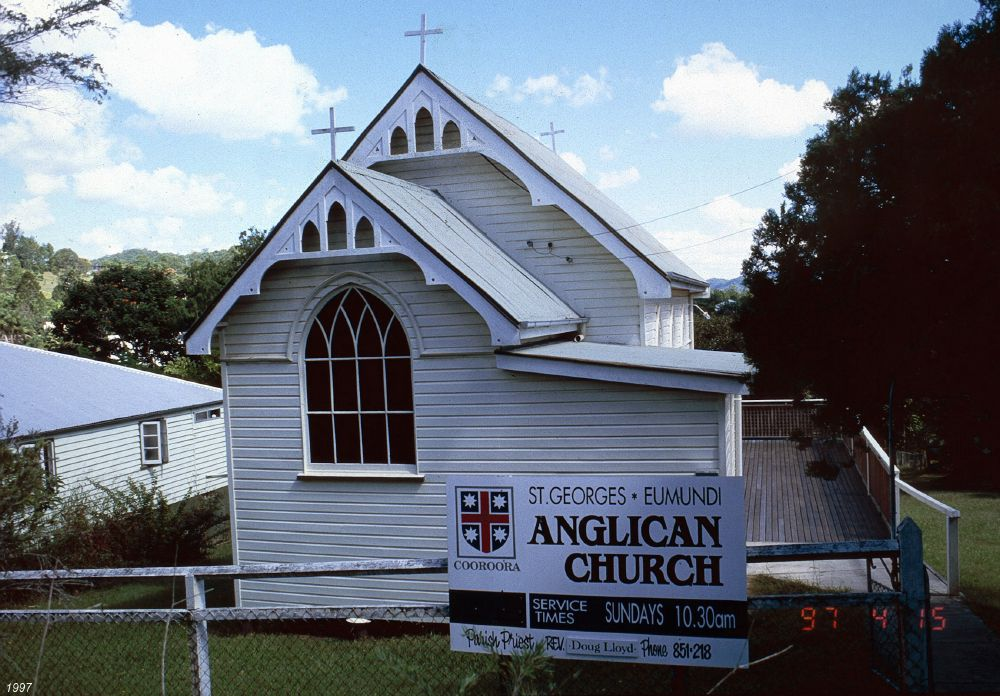
- St George's Anglican Church, 1997

- Location within Queensland Location within Australia
- 26.4725°S 152.951°E
- Location: 15 Cook Street, Eumundi, Sunshine Coast Region, Queensland, Australia

History
- Design period: 1900–1914 (early 20th century)
- Built: 1912–1912

Site notes
- Architect: J Carbury
- Architectural style: Gothic

Queensland Heritage Register
- Official name: St George's Anglican Church, St George's Church of England
- Type: state heritage (built)
- Designated: 24 September 1999
- Reference no.: 601239
- Significant period: 1910s (historical); 1910s (fabric) ongoing (social)
- Significant components: furniture/fittings, church, views to, stained glass window/s, tower – bell / belfry
- Builders: J Carbury

St George's Anglican Church is a heritage-listed church at 15 Cook Street, Eumundi, Sunshine Coast Region, Queensland, Australia. It was designed and built by J Carby in 1912. It is also known as St George's Church of England. It was added to the Queensland Heritage Register on 24 September 1999.

== History ==
St George's Anglican Church, originally St George's Church of England, was constructed in 1912 by local builder Mr J Carbury who is thought to have designed the building.

The land on which St George's Church was built was selected by Joseph Gridley who arrived in Brisbane on the James Fernie in 1856 with his wife Ellen and five children and moved to the north coast hinterland in the late 1860s. In 1877 Joseph Gridley selected Portion 70 where the church now stands for timber getting.

In 1886, the Colonial Government proposed a township at Eumundi as a station on the railway line between Brisbane and Maryborough. The rail stop serviced the Eumundi timber getting area where selectors, including the Gridleys, had selected land during the 1870s. Residential land was auctioned in 1890 and the rail line was opened in 1891. By 1893 a local provisional school was operating.

In 1894 Joseph Gridley died and the title for the land passed to his widow. Upon her death in 1902 the title passed to the seven Gridley children. The land was subdivided and changed hands a number of times and on 22 July 1912 Lot 8 was bought by Richard Eugene Morris, William Davison and Ferdinand William Clifton acting as trustees for the Church of England. The title was transferred to the Corporation of the Synod of the Diocese of Brisbane on 6 January 1918. Fund raising for the new Church of England began in 1910–11 when a Building Committee and Ladies' Guild were established.

During 1909 a request was made to the local Council to subdivide for a new residential street which became known as Cook Street. It was in Cook Street that the Trustees for the Church of England bought land and erected St George's Church. Other denominations had erected buildings in Eumundi including a Methodist church which was constructed in 1911 replacing an earlier 1893 building.

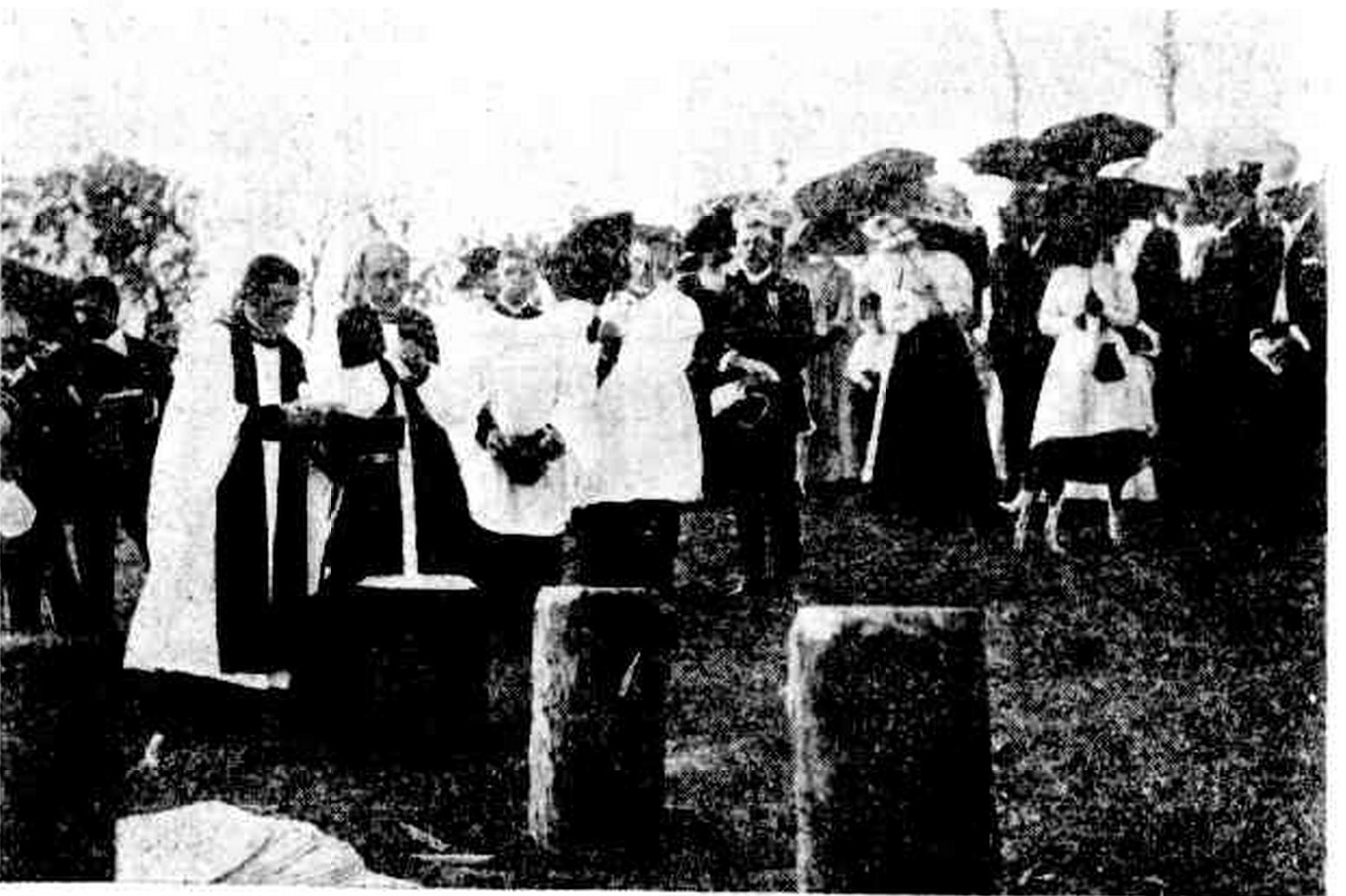
Archbishop Donaldson capping the first stump for the Church of England on St. George's Day, St George's Anglican Church, Eumundi, 1912

The first sod was turned on the construction site of St George's Church of England on 23 April 1912, St George's Day. Only three months later. Archbishop St Clair Donaldson dedicated the new building on 21 July 1912. At the service, the Archbishop congratulated the community upon their "dignified and pretty little church" which was opened completely free of debt.

The church was constructed by Mr J Carbury of Crescent Road, Eumundi, who apparently also designed the building. The design may have been borrowed from elsewhere, and was certainly reused in the later design of the Church of England, Cooroy . The building was designed with a strong influence of the nineteenth century Gothic Revival and adapted to local traditions with timber construction and lined with verandahs. Many such churches were constructed in Queensland. This example is distinguished by its quality of design and integration with the surrounding streetscape.

The Church remains substantially intact, with only a verandah addition to the northern side of the building constructed in 1997–98 and replacing an original narrower verandah.

On 26 June 2005 the closure of the church was approved by Assistant Bishop Appleby. It was subsequently sold and converted to a one-bedroom house.

== Description ==
The following description is of the church at the time of heritage listing and does not reflect any changes to the property that have occurred after it was converted to a private residence.

St George's Anglican Church is a particularly small scale timber building situated on a residential street of Eumundi. The site comprises the church at the eastern end, a timber bell tower with cast bronze bell near the Cook Street entrance, a timber toilet block to the rear of the church and large established trees. The site extends from Cook Street to Ward Street. The western end of the site contains a large Coral tree.

Because the land is steeply graded toward the rear of the building, the front of the building appears to be at road level and the structure is elevated on timber stumps, which at the western end of the building are about 2–3 metres (6 ft 7 in – 9 ft 10 in) high. The eastern boundary of the site is bordered by an early timber and wire fence, which replaced an earlier picket fence.

The church is constructed with a timber frame and clad externally with local hardwood chamfered boards and internally with hoop pine boarding. The gabled roof of the building is clad with corrugated Zincalume sheeting. The gable ends are decorated with carved timber barge boards.

The internal altar area is expressed externally on the eastern facade, facing Cook Street with a smaller gabled projecting section. This gabled section is dominated by a large pointed arched timber framed opening filled with amber coloured glass. The window provides lighting to the altar which is at this end of the building. The northern side of the building is lined with a recent wide timber framed verandah.

The principal entrance to the body of the church is via the western end, with the eastern end providing access to a small vestry. The western entrance door is a double pointed arched timber boarded door. Lining the nave of the church are lancet windows in timber frames, divided into three glazed panels, the two lower of which are hopper windows. The window glazing has been painted.

The internal walls of the church are lined with horizontal tongue and groove boarding. The floor is of ironbark. The flat ceiling is lined with timber boards. The altar recess on the eastern end of the building has a lower ceiling which has truncated corners, reflecting the pitch of the external gabled projection.

The altar of the church at the eastern end of the building is raised on a timber platform, surrounded by altar rails. The internal furnishing comprises a silky oak altar, twelve hoop pine pews, a red cedar and Queensland maple altar rail.

Beneath the elevated church areas have been enclosed for storage.

== Heritage listing ==
St George's Anglican Church was listed on the Queensland Heritage Register on 24 September 1999 having satisfied the following criteria.

The place is important in demonstrating the evolution or pattern of Queensland's history.

St George's Anglican Church, Cook Street was constructed in the early twentieth century. The Church is important in demonstrating the development of the Anglican Church in Queensland and Eumundi during this time.

The place is important because of its aesthetic significance.

St George's Anglican Church, Cook Street was constructed in the early twentieth century and is of aesthetic significance as a picturesque and well executed example of a Gothic influenced timber ecclesiastical building. Many simple timber churches were constructed throughout Queensland, this example is distinguished by the quality of its design and by its visual cohesion with the buildings in Cook Street.

The place has a strong or special association with a particular community or cultural group for social, cultural or spiritual reasons.

As a place of public worship for nearly 90 years, St George's Church of England has social value for the local Anglican community.
