= Peregian Springs, Queensland =

Peregian Springs
- Suburb
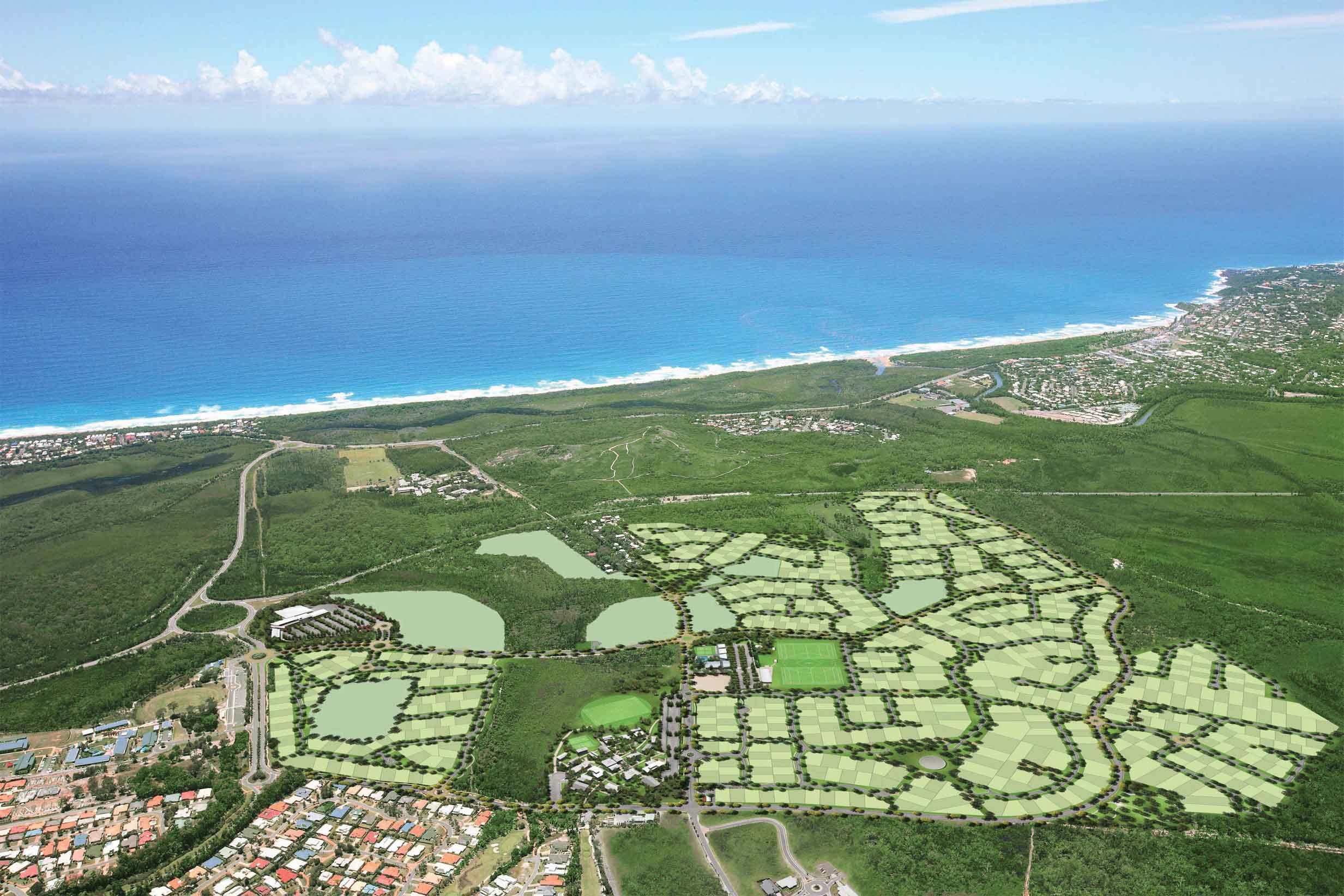
- Aerial view of Peregian Springs

- Interactive map of Peregian Springs
- Coordinates: 26.4936°S 153.0711°E
- Country: Australia
- State: Queensland
- City: Sunshine Coast
- LGA: Sunshine Coast Region, Division 9
- Location: 21.9 km (13.6 mi) N of Maroochydore; 29.8 km (18.5 mi) NE of Nambour; 50.2 km (31.2 mi) N of Caloundra; 122 km (76 mi) N of Brisbane; 1,715 km (1,066 mi) NE of Tittybong

Government
  - State electorate: Ninderry
  - Federal division: Fairfax

Area
  - Total: 5.7 km^{2} (2.2 sq mi)

Population
  - Total: 9,532 (2021 census)
  - Density: 1,672/km^{2} (4,330/sq mi)
- Time zone: UTC+10:00 (AEST)
- Postcode: 4573
Suburbs around Peregian Springs
Doonan	Peregian Beach	Peregian Beach
Verrierdale	Peregian Springs	Peregian Beach
Coolum Beach	Coolum Beach	Coolum Beach

Peregian Springs is a suburb in the Sunshine Coast Region, Queensland, Australia. In the 2021 census, Peregian Springs had a population of 9,532 people. Peregian Springs is known for master-planned residential community and the 18-hole championship Peregian Golf Course, which serves as the suburb's centerpiece.

== History ==
Peregian is a Kabi Kabi word for emu or may derive from perridhan/jan meaning mangrove seeds. Nearby Mount Peregian was formerly known as Emu Mountain.

The first inhabitants of the Peregian Springs area were the Gubbi Gubbi people who lived off the abundant riches provided by the surrounding river systems. The Gubbi Gubbi was a matrilineal society with the woman's name being given to the land and the tribe.

The first permanent non-indigenous settlers arrived in the area around 1870. The early wealth in the area was created by timber and milling with a regular paddle steamer, the Culgoa, making three trips a fortnight from Noosa to Brisbane to deliver timber. It was wrecked on the Noosa Bar on 13 May 1891.

St Andrew's Anglican College was planned to commence construction in 2001 to open in 2002. However, the discovery of the endangered wallum sedge frog (Litoria Olongburensis) on the site necessitated the revision of the school's master plan to protect the frog's natural habitat. Construction commenced in 2002 and the school was opened on 28 January 2003 by Archbishop of Brisbane, Phillip Aspinall. The school opened with 161 students directed by Principal Sue Hornum.

Peregian Springs State School commenced construction in April 2009. Gwen Sands was appointed principal to establish the school on 13 July 2009. Parents, friends and community members voted for the school's name through a wide consultation process involving the whole community. Ministerial approval for the school's name was received on 29 September 2009. The school opened on 27 January 2010 with 265 students attending on the first day. The school was officially opened by the Minister for Education and Training, Geoff Wilson on 12 February 2010. The school doubled in size in the first two years with 500 students enrolled by the end of 2011. During 2011, Stage 2 of the building program was completed giving the school another 8 classrooms and a science and technology classroom. Peregian Springs State School was awarded Independent Public School status in 2012. By 2017 the school had an indoor sports centre, outdoor courts and additional classrooms, common areas and playgrounds to accommodate more than 1,000 students.

Peregian Springs Shopping Centre opened its doors to the public in 2019.

== Demographics ==
In the 2011 census, Peregian Springs had a population of 3,949 people.

In the 2016 census, Peregian Springs had a population of 7,065 people.

In the 2021 census, Peregian Springs had a population of 9,532 people.

== Climate ==
The climate at Peregian Springs has:

- Average solar irradiation: 4.90 kWh/m^{2}/day
- Average wind speed: 3.88 m/s
- Average air temperature: 19.38 °C
- Average earth temperature: 20.18 °C
- Average humidity: 66.63%
- Average air pressure: 99.11 kPa

== Education ==
Peregian Springs State School is a government primary (Prep–6) school for boys and girls at 191 The Avenue (26.5003°S 153.0721°E). In 2017, the school had an enrolment of 1,025 students with 73 teachers (62 full-time equivalent) and 41 non-teaching staff (24 full-time equivalent). In 2018, the school had an enrolment of 1,041 students with 73 teachers (65 full-time equivalent) and 41 non-teaching staff (25 full-time equivalent). It includes a special education program.

St Andrew's Anglican College is a private primary and secondary (Prep–12) school for boys and girls at 40 Peregian Springs Drive (26.4955°S 153.0759°E). In 2018, the school had an enrolment of 1,290 students with 103 teachers (96 full-time equivalent) and 91 non-teaching staff (62 full-time equivalent). The school has an associated early learning centre and day care facility called Little Saints which accepts children from six weeks old.

There is no government secondary school in Peregian Springs. The nearest government secondary school is Coolum State High School in neighbouring Coolum Beach to the east.

== Amenities ==
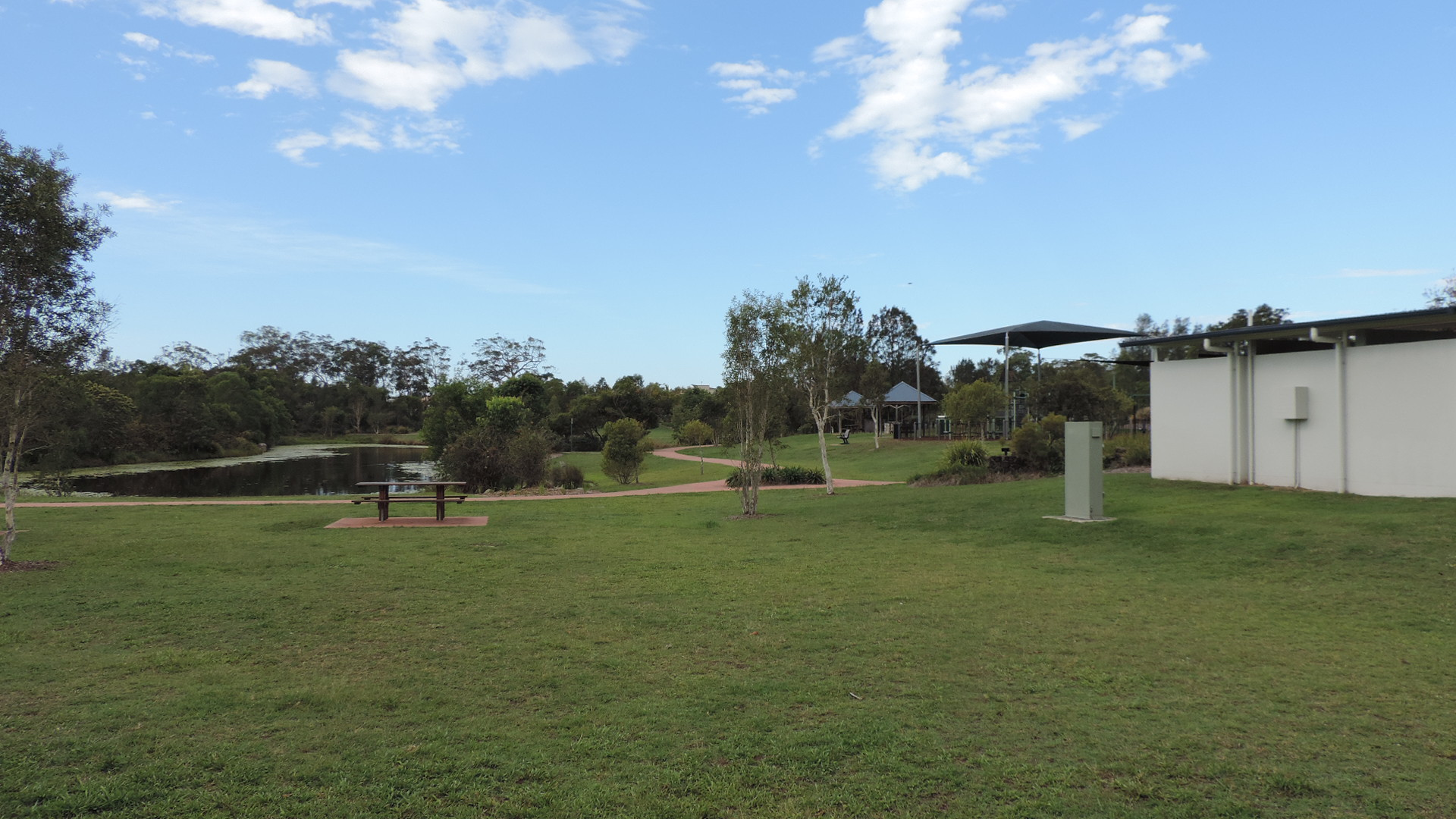
Parkland, Peregian Springs, 2014

The Sunshine Coast Council operates a mobile library service which visits the carpark of the shopping centre.

The Peregian Springs Shopping Centre is anchored by a Coles supermarket.

Residents within the Ridges estate had access to the Ridges Recreation Club. The club facilities were sold to St Andrew's Anglican College in 2023, but the community still have some access to the facility.
