= Peregian Beach =

- Town
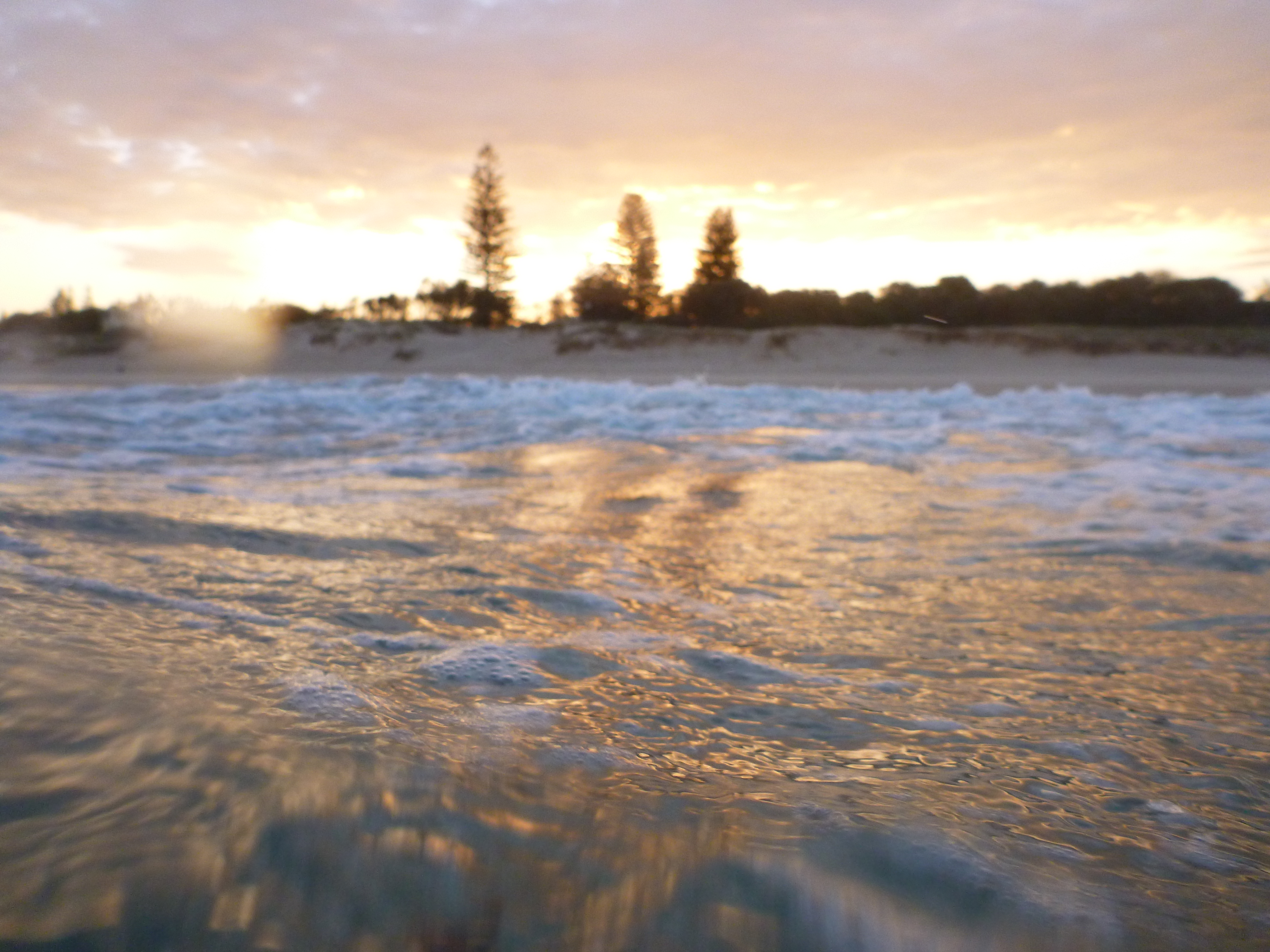
- Peregian Beach, 2012

- Interactive map of Peregian Beach
- Coordinates: 26.4805°S 153.0958°E
- Country: Australia
- State: Queensland
- LGAs: Shire of Noosa; Sunshine Coast Region
- Location: 19.3 km (12.0 mi) SE of Tewantin; 32.7 km (20.3 mi) NE of Nambour; 43.7 km (27.2 mi) N of Caloundra; 133 km (83 mi) N of Brisbane
- Established: 1960

Government
  - State electorates: Noosa; Ninderry
  - Federal division: Wide Bay

Area
  - Total: 17.2 km^{2} (6.6 sq mi)

Population
  - Total: 4,972 (2021 census)
  - Density: 289.1/km^{2} (748.7/sq mi)
- Time zone: UTC+10:00 (AEST)
- Postcode: 4573
Localities around Peregian Beach
Noosaville	Marcus Beach	Coral Sea
Doonan	Peregian Beach	Coral Sea
Peregian Springs	Coolum Beach	Coral Sea

Peregian Beach is a beach and small coastal town on the Sunshine Coast, Queensland, Australia. It is a suburb split between two local government areas with the eastern coastal in the Shire of Noosa and the western hinterland part in the Sunshine Coast Region. In the 2021 census, Peregian Beach had a population of 4,972 people.

== Geography ==
Peregian Beach within the Sunshine Coast Region comprises continual residential development along the eastern coastal strip of sandy beaches. The David Low Way passes north to south through this area. Development to the west is constrained by Noosa National Park.

Peregian Beach within the Shire of Noosa is further west, bounded on the north by Lake Weyba and to the east by Noosa National Park and Murdering Creek. Its south-western boundary roughly follows Emu Mountain Road. This area is only sparsely settled.

== History ==
The Gubbi Gubbi (also written as Kabi Kabi) are the traditional owers of the Peregian area, who lived inland during the winter and on the coast in the summer, having a camp site near Lake Weyba. The name Peregian is a Kabi Kabi word for emu or may derive from perridhan/jan meaning mangrove seeds. Nearby Mount Peregian was formerly known as Emu Mountain.

During World War II, Peregian Beach, Sunshine Beach and surrounding areas were used for artillery training. Current residents occasionally discover artillery shells and unexploded ordnance on their land.

A township began to develop in 1960 with an initial subdivision of land around Pelican Street. The town was officially named Peregian on 1 April 1966. It was renamed Perigian Beach on 1 February 1972.

Peregian Beach Community Primary School opened in 2002. In 2006, it began to offer secondary schooling with the first Year 12 students graduating in 2012. It was renamed Peregian Beach Community College, now Peregian Beach College.

Between 2008 and 2013, all of Peregian Beach (and the rest of the Shire of Noosa) was within Sunshine Coast Region.

In 2015, there was a competition for local residents to choose one of four pieces of artwork to decorate the concrete walls of the Peregian Beach Reservoir. The winning artwork was "Peregian Stand" by Peregian artist Colin Passmore which depicted a stand of melaleuca trees.

In 2018, the Peregian Beach Digital Hub was opened by Queensland minister Stirling Hinchliffe, local member Sandy Bolton, and Mayor Tony Wellington It was built on the site of the former Peregian Bowls Club.

In September 2019, Peregian Beach was significantly impacted by bushfires believed to be deliberately started by two teenagers. It took 200 firefighters two days to control the blaze.

== Demographics ==
In the 2011 census, the suburb of Peregian Beach had a population of 3,531 people.

In the 2016 census, the suburb of Peregian Beach had a population of 3,791 people.

In the 2021 census, the suburb of Peregian Beach had a population of 4,972 people.

== Education ==
Peregian Beach Community College is a private primary and secondary (Prep–12) school at 41 Old Emu Mountain Road (26.4793°S 153.0680°E).

There are no government schools in Peregian Beach. The nearest government primary schools are Peregian Springs State School in neighbouring Peregian Springs to the south-west and Sunshine Beach State School in Sunshine Beach to the north. The nearest government secondary school is Coolum State High School in neighbouring Coolum Beach to the south.

== Economy ==
The Peregian Digital Hub is a purpose-built facility for technology companies and technology designed to facilitate collaboration. It is at 253-255 David Low Way (26.47833°S 153.09507°E).

== Amenities ==
The Shire of Noosa operates a weekly mobile library service located on Woodland Drive.
