= Yandina Creek, Queensland =

Yandina Creek
- Suburb
- Interactive map of Yandina Creek
- Coordinates: 26.5263°S 153.0263°E
- Country: Australia
- State: Queensland
- LGA: Sunshine Coast Region
- Location: 8.9 km (5.5 mi) WNW of Coolum Beach; 24.2 km (15.0 mi) NE of Nambour; 41.5 km (25.8 mi) N of Caloundra; 123 km (76 mi) N of Brisbane

Government
  - State electorate: Ninderry
  - Federal division: Fairfax

Area
  - Total: 26.3 km^{2} (10.2 sq mi)

Population
  - Total: 872 (2021 census)
  - Density: 33.16/km^{2} (85.87/sq mi)
- Time zone: UTC+10:00 (AEST)
- Postcode: 4561
Suburbs around Yandina Creek
North Arm	Verrierdale	Verrierdale
Valdora	Yandina Creek	Coolum Beach
Maroochy River	Maroochy River	Coolum Beach

Yandina Creek is a rural locality in the Sunshine Coast Region, Queensland, Australia. In the 2021 census, Yandina Creek had a population of 872 people.

== Geography ==
Yandina Creek is in the Sunshine Coast hinterland. The Yandina-Coolum Road runs along the western boundary before crossing to the east.

== History ==
The name Yandina comes from Indigenous words yan meaning to go and dinna meaning feet.

Yandina Creek Provisional School opened on 16 June 1914. On 1 May 1917, it became Yandina Creek State School. It closed on 30 September 1920. On 9 May 1932, the school reopened and then closed in December 1941. In 1949, the school building from the former Valdora State School was relocated to Yandina Creek and re-opened on 1 February 1949 as Yandina Creek State School. It closed on 7 August 1964. The school was at 931 North Arm Yandina Creek Road (26.5115°S 153.0169°E).

On 4 January 2004, Coolum Beach Christian College was established by the Coolum Christian Family Church with 35 primary school children. In 2007, it expanded to offer secondary education.

== Demographics ==
In the 2016 census, Yandina Creek had a population of 760 people.

In the 2021 census, Yandina Creek had a population of 872 people.

== Education ==
Coolum Beach Christian College is a private primary and secondary (Prep-12) school for boys and girls at 2 Arcoona Road (26.5354°S 153.0472°E). In 2017, the school had an enrolment of 295 students with 23 teachers (20 full-time equivalent) and 23 non-teaching staff (13 full-time equivalent). In 2018, the school had an enrolment of 356 students with 28 teachers (25 full-time equivalent) and 24 non-teaching staff (15 full-time equivalent).

The nearest government primary schools are North Arm State School in neighbouring North Arm to the north-west, Coolum State School in neighbouring Coolum Beach to the east, and Yandina State School in Yandina to south-west. The nearest government secondary schools are Coolum State High School in Coolum Beach and Nambour State College in Nambour to the south-west.
