= North Arm, Queensland =

North Arm
- Town
- Interactive map of North Arm
- Coordinates: 26.5155°S 152.9544°E
- Country: Australia
- State: Queensland
- City: Sunshine Coast
- LGA: Sunshine Coast Region
- Location: 16.8 km (10.4 mi) N of Nambour; 13.1 km (8.1 mi) S of Cooroy; 43.3 km (26.9 mi) NNW of Caloundra; 124 km (77 mi) N of Brisbane

Government
  - State electorates: Nicklin; Ninderry
  - Federal division: Fairfax

Area
  - Total: 22.7 km^{2} (8.8 sq mi)

Population
  - Total: 734 (2021 census)
  - Density: 32.33/km^{2} (83.75/sq mi)
- Time zone: UTC+10:00 (AEST)
- Postcode: 4561
Localities around North Arm
Eerwah Vale	Eumundi	Verrierdale
Bridges	North Arm	Yandina Creek
Bridges	Ninderry	Valdora

North Arm is a rural town and locality in the Sunshine Coast Region, Queensland, Australia. In the 2021 census, the locality of North Arm had a population of 734 people.

== Geography ==
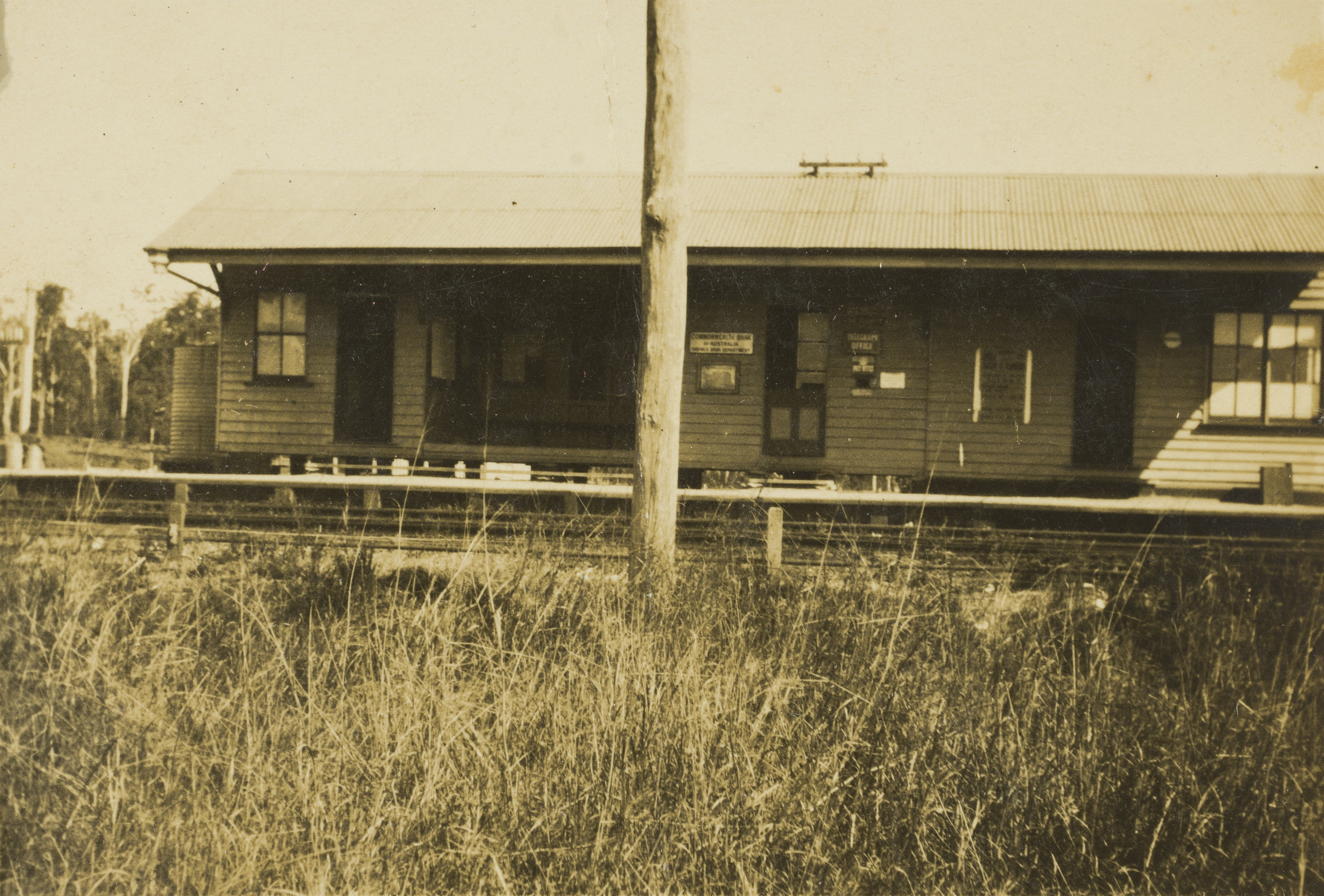
North Arm railway station, circa 1925

North Arm is in the Sunshine Coast hinterland. It takes its name from the North Maroochy River which flows through it.

The Bruce Highway passes through the locality and town from south to north. The North Coast railway line runs beside and east of the highway with the town being served by North Arm railway station (26.5184°S 152.9551°E).

Gneering is a neighbourhood in the south-west of the locality (26.5166°S 152.9333°E).

== History ==
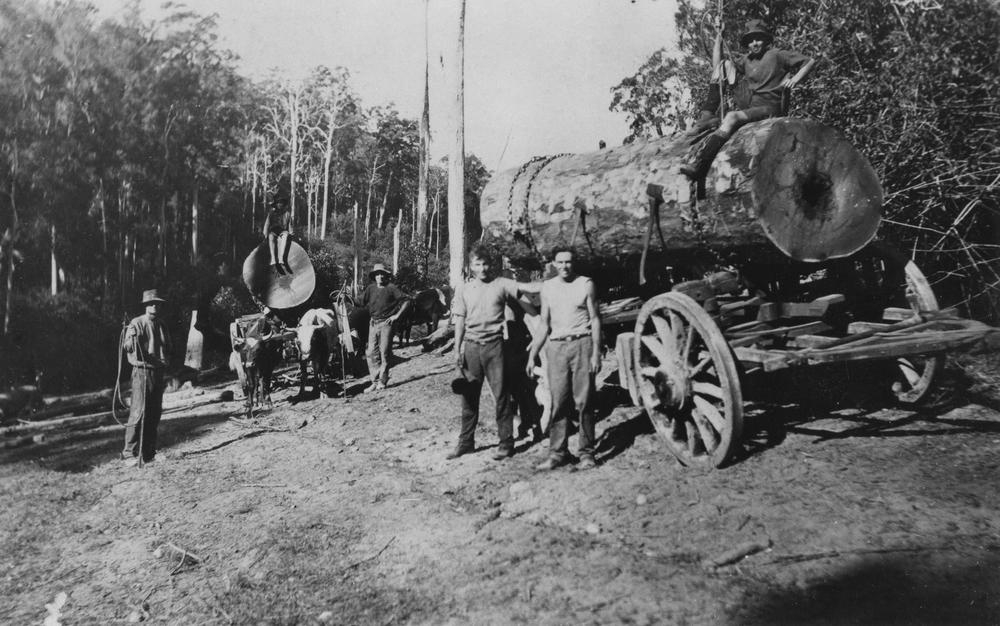
Bullockies standing near bullock carts carrying logs in North Arm, circa 1920

The name North Arm refers to the district's proximity to the northern branch of the Maroochy River.

Canando Cattle Run, which included North Arm, was opened up in 1868 to selectors with some of the land being set aside for timber reserves around Mount Ninderry.

Fairhill Provisional School opened on 27 July 1885. On 1 January 1909, it became Fairhill State School. In October 1915, it was renamed North Arm State School.

In 1886, Friedrich Goethe planted the first sugarcane in North Arm. At that time, there was no mill for crushing sugarcane, which became an agricultural industry for the next hundred years.

In 1914, the North Arm Hall opened and remained a hub of community social life for 40 years, until it was destroyed by a cyclone in 1954 and was later rebuilt.

Brown's Creek State School opened on 29 January 1918 and closed on 23 August 1936. This school was located on the south side of King Creek near its junction with Browns Creek, in the locality currently called Eerwah Vale.

Golden Valley State School opened on 27 August 1918. On 1 July 1940, it was renamed Valdora State School. In 1949 the school building was moved and renamed Yandina Creek State School. It closed on 7 August 1964.

== Demographics ==
In the 2016 census, the locality of North Arm had a population of 657 people.

In the 2021 census, the locality of North Arm had a population of 734 people.

== Education ==
North Arm State School is a government primary (Prep-6) school for boys and girls at the corner of Fairhill Road and Yandina Creek Road (26.5232°S 152.9657°E). In 2018, the school had an enrolment of 351 students with 30 teachers (24 full-time equivalent) and 23 non-teaching staff (12 full-time equivalent).

There are no secondary schools in North Arm. The nearest government secondary schools are Nambour State College in Nambour to the south and Noosa District State High School which has its junior campus in Pomona and its senior campus in Cooroy, both to the north-west.

== Amenities ==
North Arm has a forest reserve on the outskirts of town.
