= Lake Weyba =

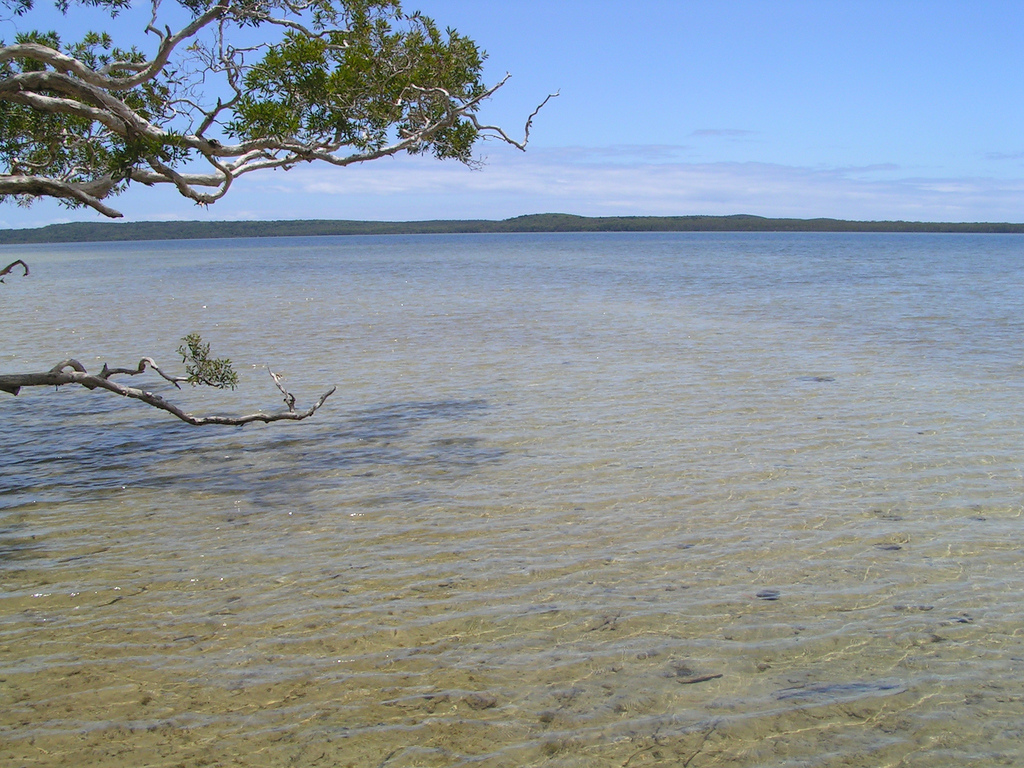

- Location within Queensland
- Location: 4 km South of Noosa, Queensland
- Coordinates: 26.4391°S 153.0742°E
- Type: Salt-water lake
- Basin countries: Australia
- Surface area: 9.6 square kilometres (3.7 sq mi)

Lake Weyba is a large shallow salt lake in the locality of Noosaville in the Shire of Noosa, Queensland, Australia.

== History ==
Lake Weyba's name comes from the local Aboriginal Australians (Gubbi Gubbi) language meaning stingray. Lake Weyba is an important fish-breeding habitat. In the early 1900s, Lake Weyba had a large number of stingrays, which would have been easy targets for spear fishing Aboriginal Australians.
