= Electoral district of Ninderry =

State electoral district of Queensland, Australia

Ninderry Queensland—Legislative Assembly
- Map of the electoral district of Ninderry, 2017
- State: Queensland
- Dates current: 2017–present
- MP: Dan Purdie
- Party: Liberal National Party
- Namesake: Ninderry, Queensland
- Electors: 38,836 (2020)
- Area: 301 km^{2} (116.2 sq mi)
- Demographic: Provincial
- Coordinates: 26.5486°S 153.0134°E
Electorates around Ninderry:
Nicklin	Noosa	Noosa
Nicklin	Ninderry	Coral Sea
Nicklin	Buderim	Maroochydore

Ninderry is an electoral district of the Legislative Assembly in the Australian state of Queensland. It was created in the 2017 redistribution. From results of the 2015 election, Ninderry was estimated to be a fairly safe seat for the Liberal National Party with a margin of 6.9%.

Located in the Sunshine Coast, Ninderry consists of the suburbs of Eumundi, Doonan, Weyba Downs, Peregian Beach, Peregian Springs, Verrierdale, North Arm, Ninderry, Valdora, Yandina, Yandina Creek, Coolum Beach, Maroochy River, Parklands, Bli Bli, Rosemount, Diddillibah, Kiels Mountain, Kunda Park, Kuluin, Forest Glen, Mons and "North Buderim".

== Members for Ninderry ==
Member	Party	Term
Dan Purdie	Liberal National	2017–present

== Election results ==
2024 Queensland state election: Ninderry
Party	Candidate	Votes	%	±%
Liberal National	Dan Purdie	17,950	48.43	+4.43
Labor	Jo Justo	9,774	26.37	−6.03
Greens	Tom Carden	3,738	10.08	−2.42
One Nation	Michael Stewart	3,243	8.75	+2.55
Legalise Cannabis	Timothy Nixon	2,362	6.37	+6.37
Total formal votes		37,067	96.34	
Informal votes		1,407	3.66	
Turnout		38,474	88.70	
Two-party-preferred result
Liberal National	Dan Purdie	22,411	60.46	+6.36
Labor	Jo Justo	14,656	39.54	−6.36
Liberal National hold		Swing	+6.36	

2020 Queensland state election: Ninderry
Party	Candidate	Votes	%	±%
Liberal National	Dan Purdie	14,582	44.01	+7.90
Labor	Melinda Dodds	10,714	32.34	+9.58
Greens	Dan Bryar	4,149	12.52	−1.77
One Nation	Frank Weijers	2,072	6.25	−12.40
Informed Medical Options	Andrea Newland-Blackmore	1,344	4.06	+4.06
United Australia	Jay Giles	272	0.82	+0.82
Total formal votes		33,133	96.30	+1.26
Informal votes		1,274	3.70	−1.26
Turnout		34,407	88.60	+1.27
Two-party-preferred result
Liberal National	Dan Purdie	17,927	54.11	−4.27
Labor	Melinda Dodds	15,206	45.89	+4.27
Liberal National hold		Swing	−4.27	

== See also ==
- Electoral districts of Queensland
- Members of the Queensland Legislative Assembly by year
- Category:Members of the Queensland Legislative Assembly by name
