= Eumundi, Queensland =

Eumundi
- Town
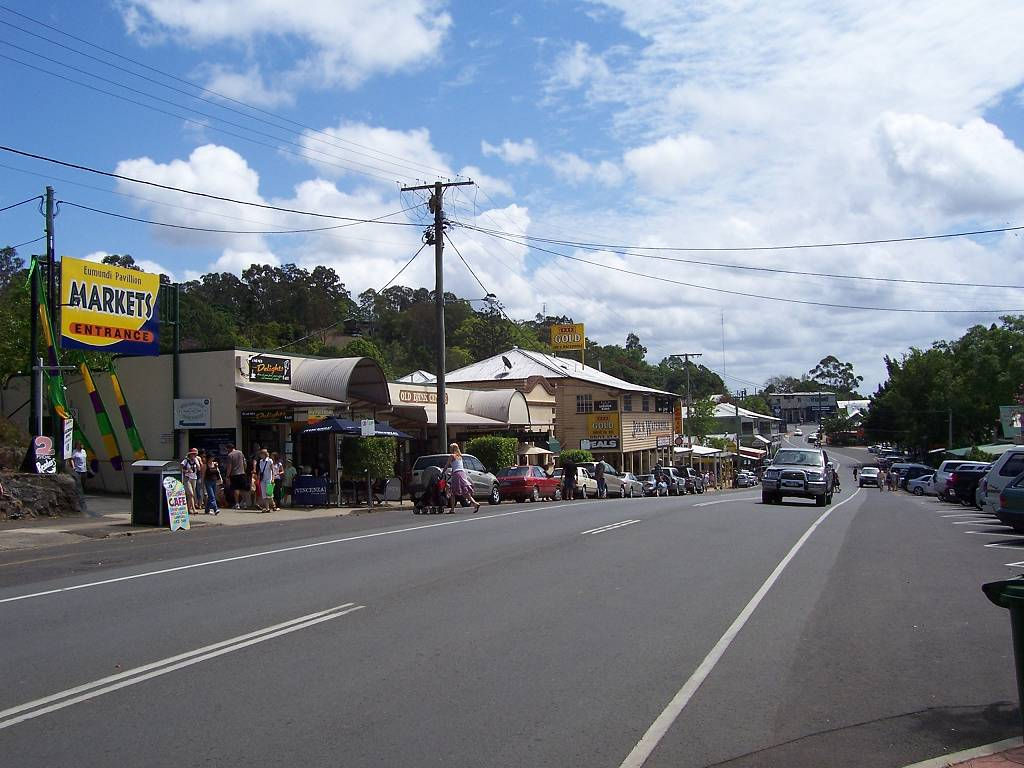
- Eumundi Town Centre

- Interactive map of Eumundi
- Coordinates: 26.4800°S 152.9519°E
- Country: Australia
- State: Queensland
- City: Sunshine Coast
- LGA: Sunshine Coast Region
- Location: 19.1 km (11.9 mi) N of Nambour; 21.0 km (13.0 mi) SE of Pomona; 118 km (73 mi) N of Brisbane CBD
- Established: 1890

Government
  - State electorates: Ninderry; Nicklin
  - Federal division: Fairfax

Area
  - Total: 22.8 km^{2} (8.8 sq mi)

Population
  - Total: 2,504 (2021 census)
  - Density: 109.82/km^{2} (284.4/sq mi)
- Time zone: UTC+10:00 (AEST)
- Postcode: 4562
Localities around Eumundi
Cooroy	Cooroy Mountain	Doonan
Eerwah Vale	Eumundi	Verrierdale
Eerwah Vale	North Arm	North Arm

Eumundi is a rural town and locality in the Sunshine Coast Region, Queensland, Australia. Eumundi is very popular on the coast for its bi-weekly farmers' markets. In the 2021 census, the locality of Eumundi had a population of 2,504 people.

== Geography ==
Eumundi is 21 kilometres (13 mi) south-west of Noosa Heads and 118 kilometres (73 mi) north of the state capital, Brisbane. It is located just off the Bruce Highway. Nearby towns are Yandina and Cooroy. The Eumundi-Noosa Road starts at the Bruce Highway and exits to the east.

== History ==
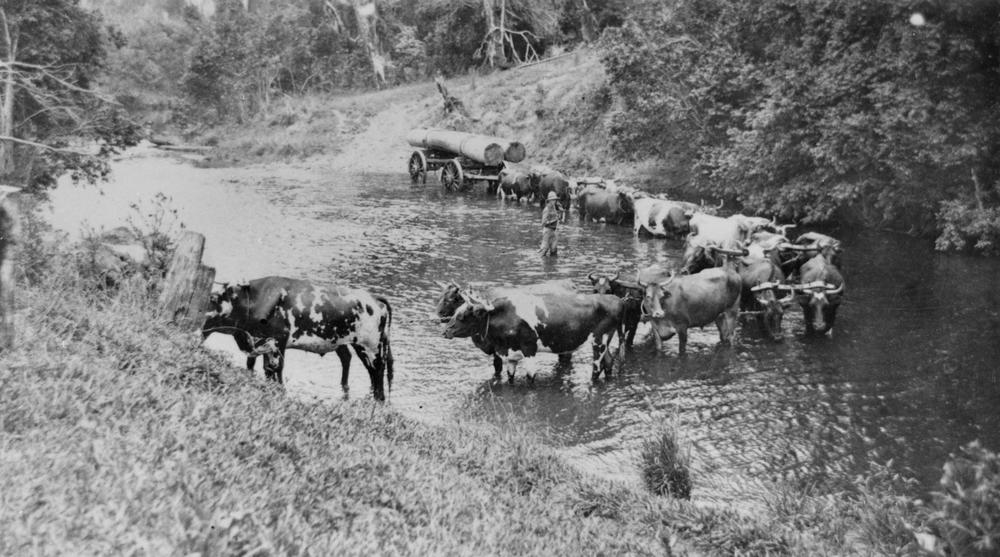
Bullock team, 1917

Town blocks were surveyed and divided in 1890. The town's name is believed to come from the Kabi name Ngumundi, the name of a local Indigenous clan leader. Prior to 1890 the town was called Eerwah after Mount Eerwah; this was changed to avoid confusion with the nearby town of Beerwah.

The original Eumundi railway station opened in 1891 on Gympie Road (now Memorial Drive) opposite Gridley Street (26.4770°S 152.9529°E) as part of the opening of the North Coast line; it is now the site of the Eumundi Markets. The current Eumundi railway station (26.4806°S 152.9550°E) opened in 1988 when a 10-kilometre (6.2 mi) deviation was built as part of the electrification of the North Coast line.

St Ita's Catholic Church was originally built circa 1896 on a hilltop on the corner of Gridley Street and Crescent Street overlooking the town. A church bell was installed in 1912. In 1934 it was relocated closer to the town centre at 129 Memorial Drive (26.4730°S 152.9474°E). Australian Prime Minister Kevin Rudd attended this church as a child (he became an Anglican later in life). The church closed circa 1976 and the building sold and is now a private home. The church bell is now in the Eumundi Museum.

On Thursday 14 June 1900, 17 choice farm blocks were advertised for auction by King and King Auctioneers. A map advertising the auction stated that Eumundi Estate was 1/4 mile from Eumundi Station and the Brisbane and Gympie Railway line ran through the property.

In 1906, at the Land Office in Brisbane, the Queensland Government auctioned 13 town lots in Eumundi, each of which was approximately 2 acres (0.81 ha). These were located in two groups, one near Etheridge Street and the other near Arundell Street.

Eumundi Butter Factory was built in 1907, becoming the largest milk collecting building on the Sunshine Coast. The dairy mainly produced butter and cream until it was closed in 1953 when milk was moved to Brisbane for processing. The building was destroyed by fire on 10 July 2005.

A town hall was completed in 1908 after a school of arts committee raised the funds.

On Saturday 2 December 1911, the Eumundi Methodist Church was officially opened by Reverend Henry Youngman, President of the Methodist Church of Australia. The church at 73 Memorial Drive (26.4772°S 152.9521°E) was built by Francis Gustavus Hill and was 33 by 25 feet (10.1 by 7.6 m). The external walls were double-dressed crow's ash chamferboard, the ceiling was of pine, and the roof was iron. In 1996, the now-closed Methodist Church was re-opened as the Eumundi Historical Museum.

St George's Anglican Church at 15 Cook Street was dedicated on 21 July 1912 by Archbishop St Clair Donaldson. Its closure on 26 June 2005 was approved by Assistant Bishop Appleby. The property was sold and the church is now a private residence.

The Eumundi branch of the Queensland Country Women's Association was established on 9 November 1927. On 26 December 1929 their building was officially opened by Harry Walker, Member of the Queensland Legislative Assembly for Cooroora.

St Andrew's Presbyterian Church at 123 Memorial Drive (26.4731°S 152.9475°E) opened in 1953.

The Orana Nursery, operated in Eumundi from 1973 to 1991. It became the largest supplier of bougainvilleas in the Sunshine Coast region.

Eumundi was bisected by the Bruce Highway until a 2.4-kilometre (1.5 mi) bypass was completed in August 1976. between Eerwah Vale and Main Creek.

On 24 March 1979, the first Eumundi Market was held at the CWA hall with 3 stalls, 8 visitors and $30 of sales. It grew to over 600 stalls and 1.6 million visitors each year.

The original Eumundi Brewery was opened in the Imperial Hotel in 1988. The brewery was closed in the late 1990s, but was rebuilt on its original site in the Imperial Hotel in 2017.

In September 2019, the Eumundi Community Church (formerly the St Andrew's Presbyterian Church) closed, leaving the town without any active churches. The closure was due to declining attendance which was attributed to decreasing religious beliefs (in the 2016 census 43% of Eumundi residents said they had "no religion") and a preference of those with religious beliefs to attend larger services in other towns, such as the Hillsong Church in Noosa Heads.

In 2020, the town's rugby union club fielded a senior team for the first time in about 100 years.

== Heritage listings ==
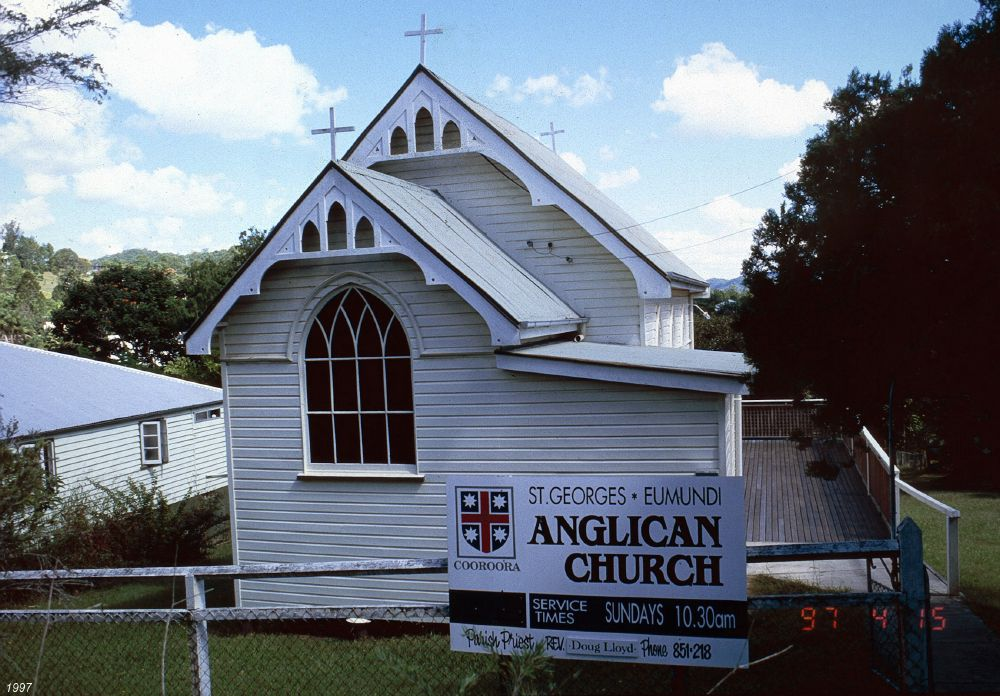
St George's Anglican Church, 1997

Eumundi has a number of heritage-listed sites, including:

- Eumundi School of Arts, 63 Memorial Drive (26.4784°S 152.9527°E)
- Eumundi War Memorial Trees, Memorial Drive (26.4775°S 152.9523°E)
- St George's Anglican Church, 15 Cook Street (26.4725°S 152.951°E)

== Demographics ==
In the 2011 census, the locality of Eumundi had a population of 1,924 people.

In the 2016 census, the locality of Eumundi had a population of 2,221 people.

In the 2021 census, the locality of Eumundi had a population of 2,504 people with 47.8% males and 52.2% females.

== Education ==
Eumundi State School is a government primary (Prep-6) school for boys and girls at 22 Caplick Way (26.4730°S 152.9521°E). In 2018, the school had an enrolment of 645 students with 46 teachers (40 full-time equivalent) and 25 non-teaching staff (16 full-time equivalent). It includes a special education program.

There are no secondary schools in Eumundi. The nearest government secondary school is Noosa District State High School which operates on two campuses. Its junior campus is in Pomona to the north-west and its senior campus is in neighbouring Cooroy to the immediate north-west.

== Facilities ==
Eumundi Police Station is at 5 Napier Street (26.4740°S 152.9516°E).

Eumundi Post Office is at 71 Memorial Drive (26.4774°S 152.9525°E).

Eumundi Cemetery is at 632 Bunya Road (26.4913°S 152.9397°E). It is managed by the Sunshine Coast Regional Council.

== Amenities ==
The Sunshine Coast Regional Council operates a mobile library service which visits Memorial Drive across from the School of Arts (26.4780°S 152.9533°E) on Tuesday afternoons.

The Eumundi branch of the Queensland Country Women's Association meets at QCWA Hall at 78 Memorial Drive (26.4768°S 152.9524°E).

The Eumundi Aquatic Centre is on Memorial Drive (26.4825°S 152.9536°E). It has swimming pools and a gym. There are also tennis courts on the site operated by the Eumundi Tennis Club.

Eumundi Showgrounds is at 1 Black Stump Road (26.4718°S 152.9422°E).

There is a child care centre at 4 Napier Street (26.4746°S 152.9514°E).

== Events ==
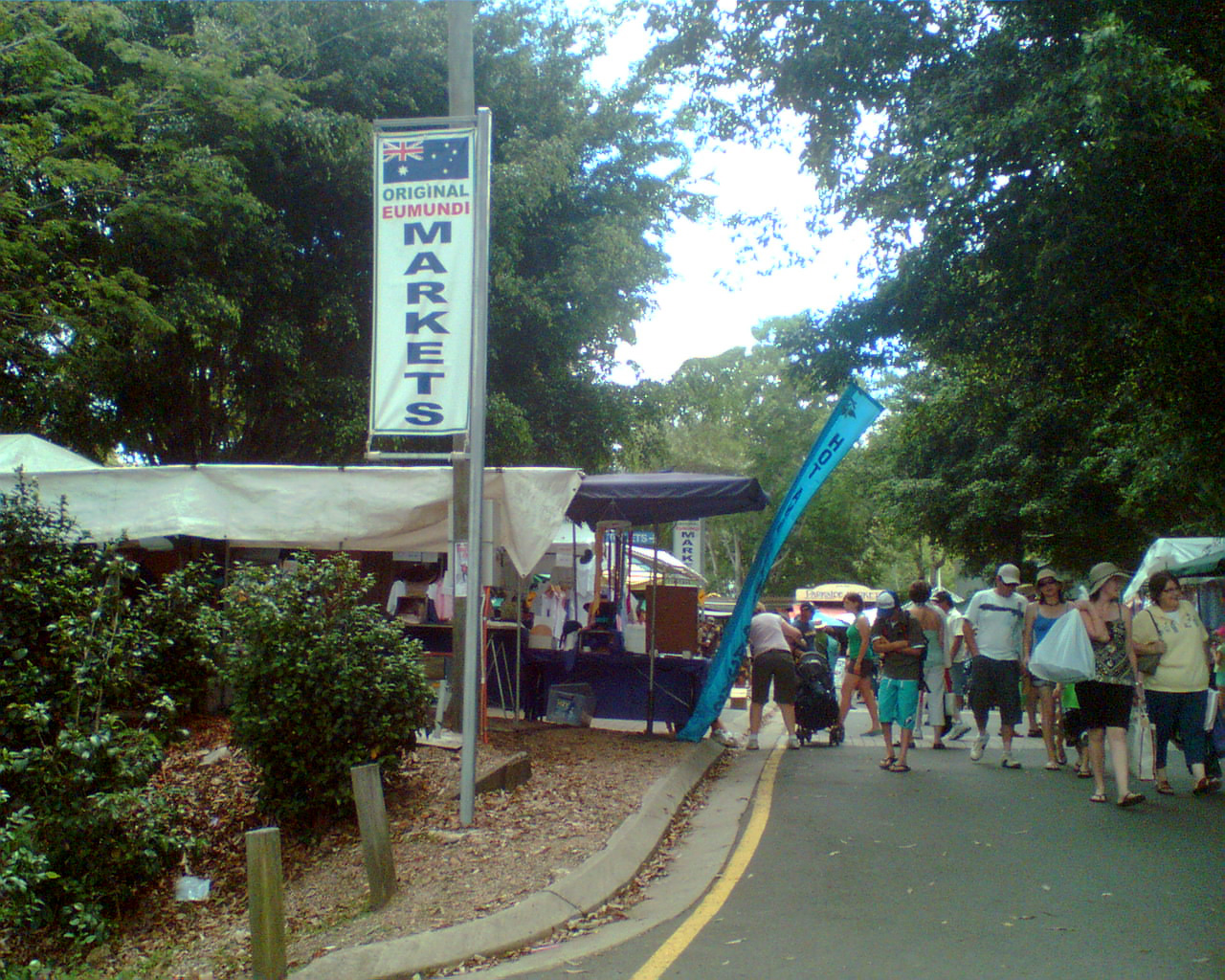
Eumund Markets, 2006

The Eumundi Markets are held on Wednesdays and Saturdays at 80 Memorial Drive (26.4765°S 152.9523°E). The markets have a philosophy of "locally made".

The Eumundi Agricultural Show was traditionally held in September each year, but was not been held since the COVID-19 pandemic. There was to be a show in 2024, but it was cancelled.

== Attractions ==
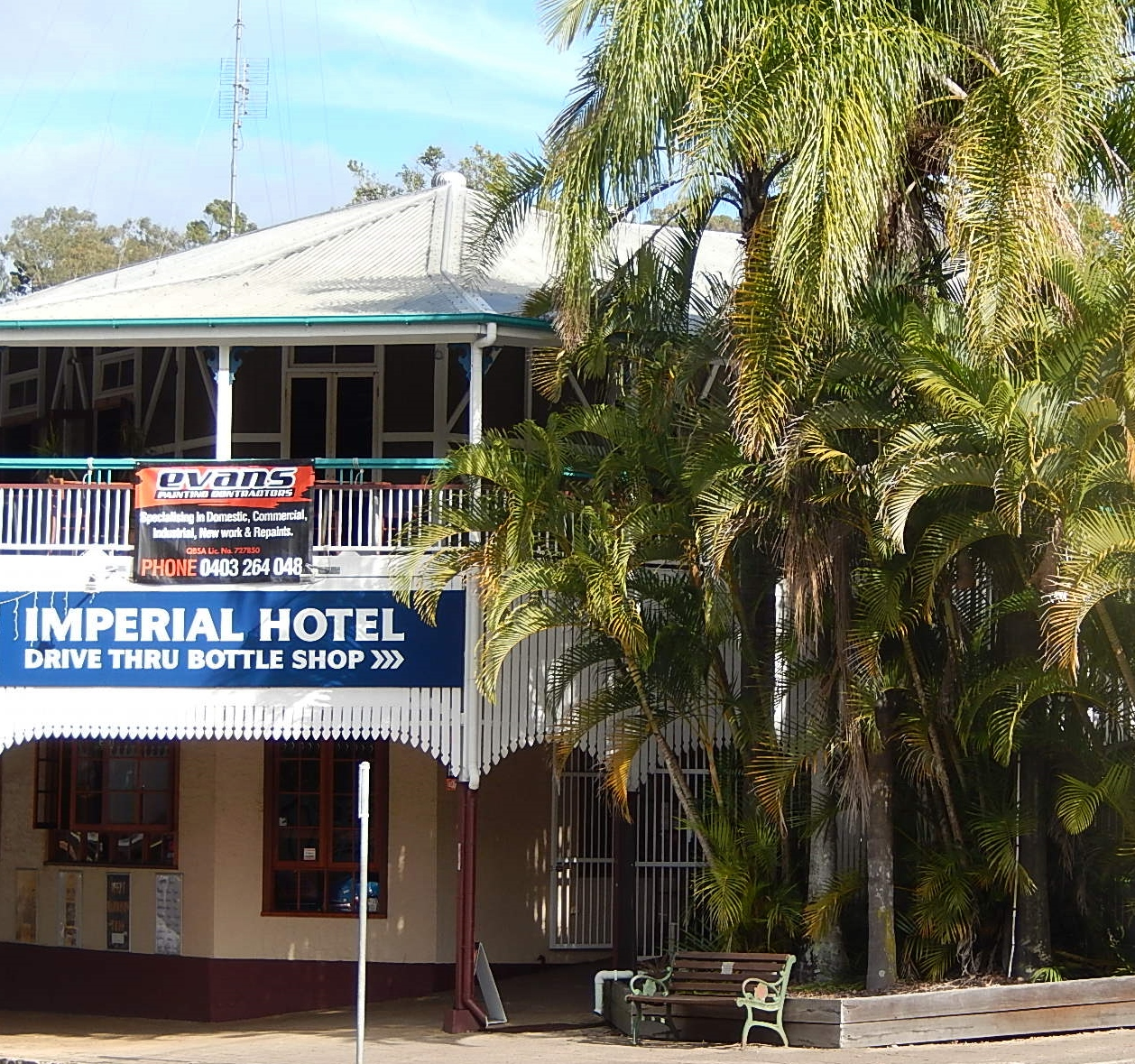
Imperial Hotel, 2013

Eumundi Brewery at the Imperial Hotel at 1 Etheridge Street (26.4759°S 152.9508°E) offers tours of the brewery. However, during 2020 and 2021, the tours have been suspended due to the COVID-19 pandemic.

As at February 2021, the Eumundi Museum at 73 Memorial Drive (26.4772°S 152.9522°E) is closed for refurbishment expected to re-open in late 2021.

Ball Lookout at 224 Eumundi Range Road (26.4546°S 152.9575°E) has panoramic views to the south-west.

Bi-Centennial Lookout at the end of Panorama Drive (26.4553°S 152.9788°E) on the boundary with Doonan has 360-degree panoramic views.

== Notable residents ==
Notable former residents include:

- Pat Rafter, tennis champion
- Kevin Rudd, the former Prime Minister of Australia and former Foreign minister

== See also ==
- List of Australian place names of Aboriginal origin
