= Coolum Beach, Queensland =

Coolum Beach
- Town
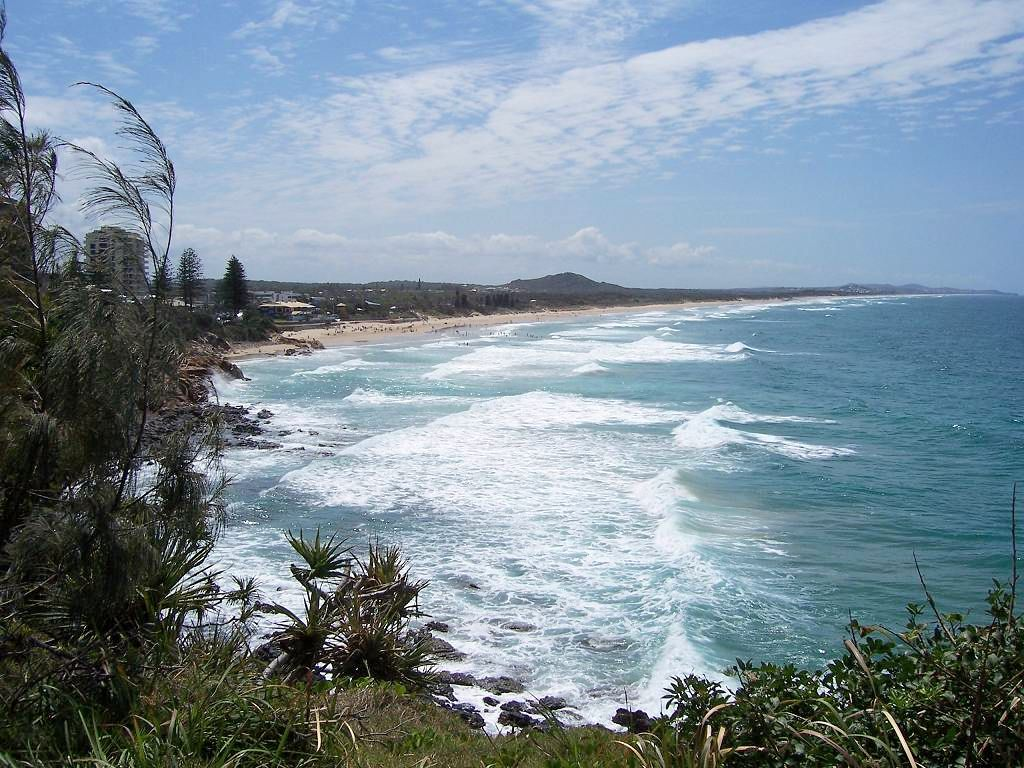
- Coolum Beach, looking north

- Interactive map of Coolum Beach
- Coordinates: 26.5295°S 153.0910°E
- Country: Australia
- State: Queensland
- City: Sunshine Coast
- LGA: Sunshine Coast Region, Divisions 8 and 9
- Location: 26.8 km (16.7 mi) NE of Nambour; 37.8 km (23.5 mi) N of Caloundra; 118 km (73 mi) N of Brisbane

Government
  - State electorates: Ninderry; Maroochydore
  - Federal division: Fairfax

Area
  - Total: 27.3 km^{2} (10.5 sq mi)
- Elevation: 8 m (26 ft)

Population
  - Total: 9,152 (2021 census)
  - Density: 335.2/km^{2} (868.3/sq mi)
- Time zone: UTC+10:00 (AEST)
- Postcode: 4573
Localities around Coolum Beach
Verrierdale	Peregian Springs	Peregian Beach
Yandina Creek	Coolum Beach	Coral Sea
Maroochy River	Mount Coolum	Yaroomba; Point Arkwright

Coolum Beach is a beachside town and coastal suburb in the Sunshine Coast Region, Queensland, Australia. In the 2021 census, the suburb of Coolum Beach had a population of 9,152 people.

== Geography ==
Coolum Beach has the following mountains (from north to south):

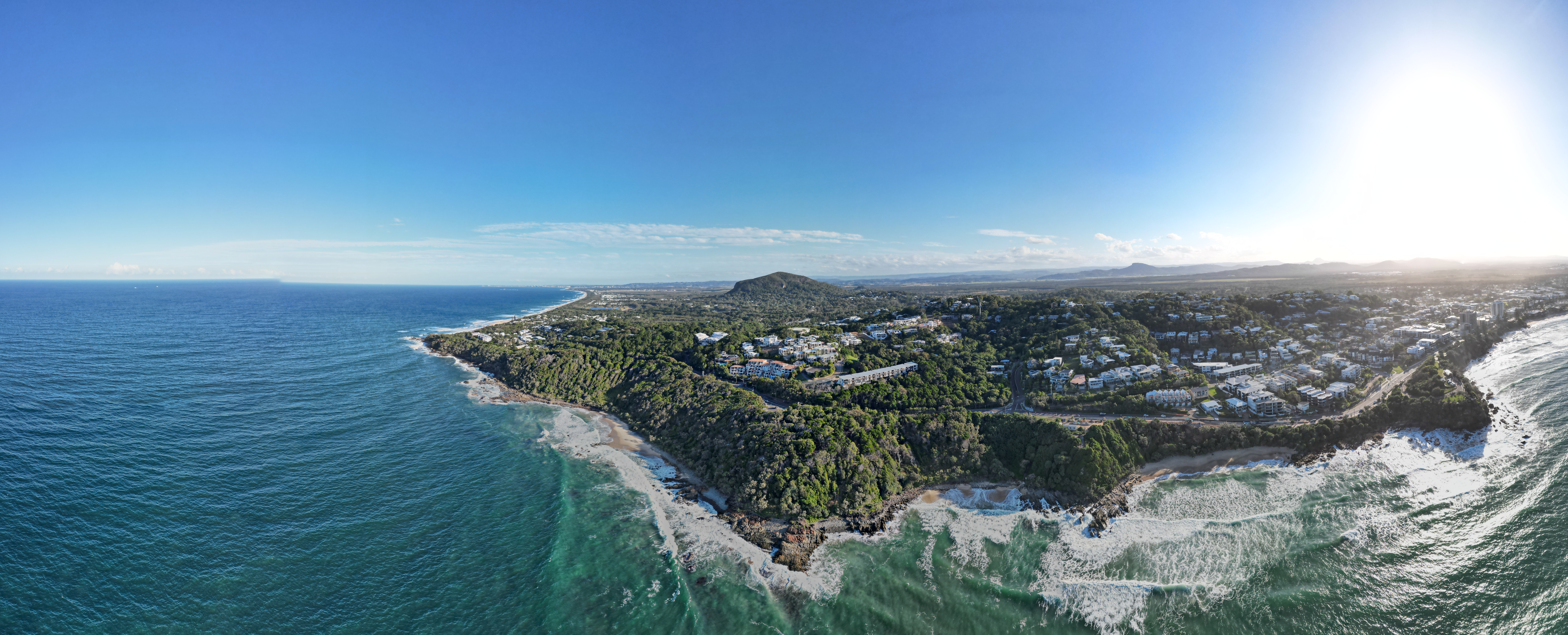
Coolum Beach panorama

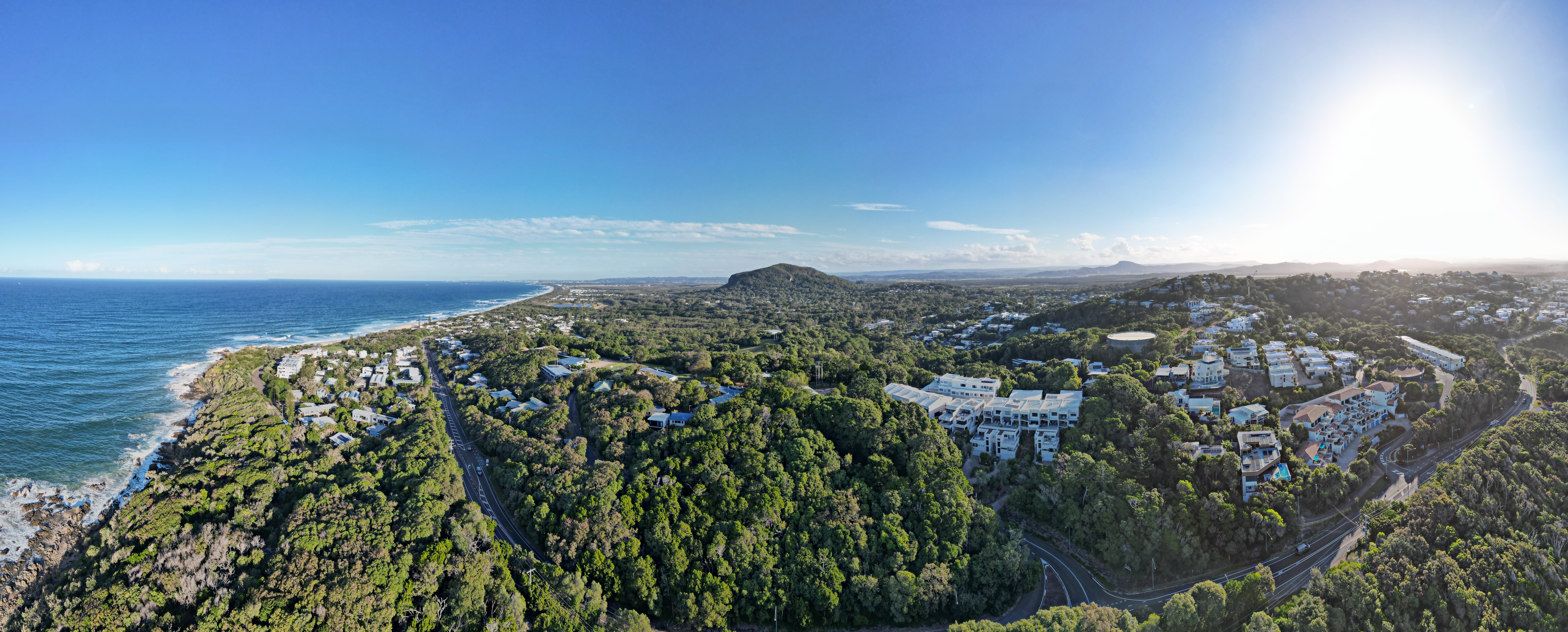
Mount Coolum sits in the background of this panorama

- Mount Peregian (Mount Emu) (26.5068°S 153.0866°E) 71 metres (233 ft)
- Toboggan Hill (26.5359°S 153.0905°E) 80 metres (260 ft)
- Eurungunder Hill (26.5423°S 153.0918°E) 100 metres (330 ft)

Coolum Beach has the following coastal features (from north to south):

- Peregian Beach (26.5053°S 153.0950°E), extending south from Peregian Beach to the north-east
- Coolum Beach (26.5218°S 153.0932°E), along the mid-coastline of the suburb
- Point Perry (26.5360°S 153.0958°E)

However, Mount Coolum (to the south of the suburb) dominates the landscape.

The Yandina-Coolum Road enters from the west.

== History ==
The town's name originated from the indigenous term "gulum" or "kulum," meaning "blunt" or "headless," in reference to Mount Coolum's shape.

The Coolum district encompasses the traditional land of the 'Inabara' or 'Yinneburra' clan from the Undanbi tribe, which was a subset of the larger group known as Kabi Kabi (or Gubbi Gubbi).

Coolum Provisional School opened on 2 April 1917. In 1930, it became Coolum State School.

In December 1923, land in the Mt Coolum Beach Estate second section went to auction, following the successful sale of portions in the first section, and one month after the official opening of the Moreton Central Sugar Mill Cane Tramway extension to Coolum. All lots were described as having an uninterrupted view of the Pacific Ocean.

In 1931, the Coolum Beach branch of the Queensland Country Women's Association were donated a block of land and purchased the adjacent block at 7–9 Coolum Terrace (26.5326°S 153.0917°E). In 1965, a former school building was moved onto the block which was replaced with a new building in 1990. In 2013, the CWA decided that the hall was under-utilised and that its increasing property value should be realised to support other projects. The property was sold into private ownership on 21 September 2013 for $660,000.

Holy Spirit Anglican Church was dedicated on 14 November 1970. It was consecrated by Archbishop Felix Arnott on 5 November 1977.

Coolum State High School opened on 29 January 1985.

The Coolum Library opened in 1989 with a major refurbishment in 1997.

In 2002, Coolum hosted the Commonwealth Heads of Government Meeting, replacing the 2001 meeting that was postponed and moved from Brisbane in the wake of the September 11 attacks.

Along with a number of other regional Australian newspapers owned by NewsCorp, the Coolum News newspaper ceased publication in June 2020.

== Demographics ==
In the 2016 census, the suburb of Coolum Beach had a population of 8,497 people.

In the 2021 census, the suburb of Coolum Beach had a population of 9,152 people.

== Education ==
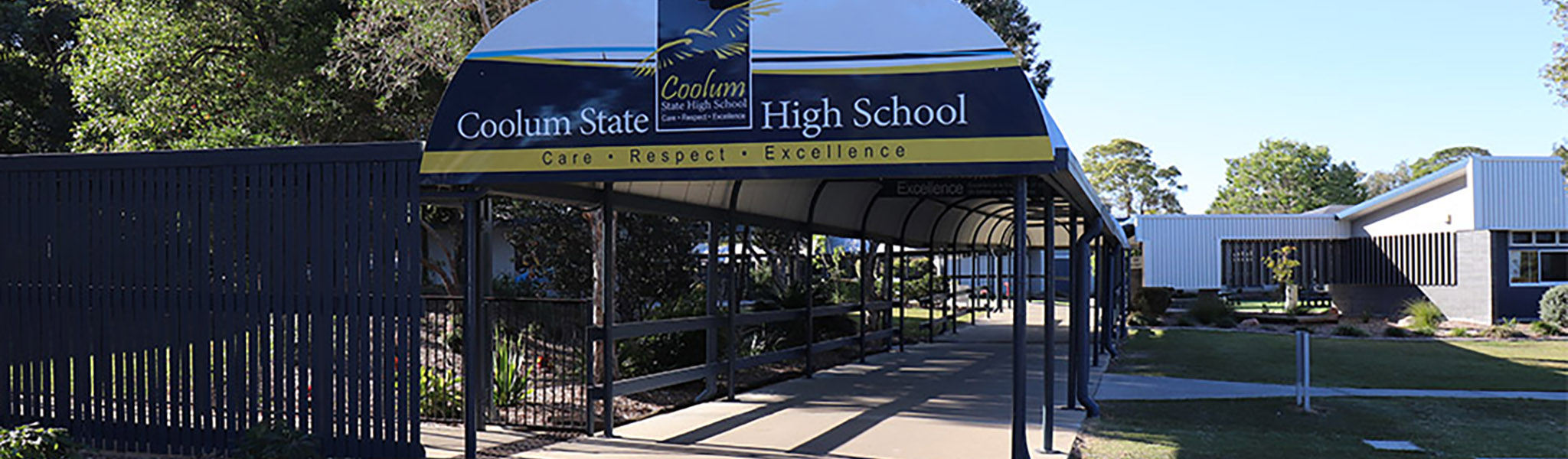
Coolum State High School, 2018

Coolum State School is a government primary (Prep–6) school for boys and girls at School Road (26.5350°S 153.0783°E). In 2018, the school had an enrolment of 1,025 students with 69 teachers (63 full-time equivalent) and 45 non-teaching staff (28 full-time equivalent). It includes a special education program.

Coolum State High School is a government secondary school for boys and girls at Havana Road East (26.5019°S 153.0862°E); the school services grades 7 through 12. In 2018, the school had an enrolment of 1,092 students with 88 teachers (84 full-time equivalent) and 34 non-teaching staff (26 full-time equivalent). It includes a special education program.

Despite the name, Coolum Beach Christian College is in neighbouring Yandina Creek.

== Amenities ==
The Sunshine Coast Council operates a public library at 6 Park Street.

Coolum Beach Uniting Church is at 22–26 Elizabeth Street (corner of Heathfield Road, 26.5286°S 153.0883°E).

Holy Spirit Anglican Church is 25 Beach Road (corner of Perry Street, 26.5326°S 153.0902°E).

== Attractions ==
Coolum Beach is a popular day trip and holiday destination. The town is focused around the beach, which is patrolled by life savers and offers swimming and surfing; in its day, the beach is known as one of the best breaks in Queensland. Parks, a boardwalk, esplanade shops, and the surf lifesaver club surround the beach. Over the last five years Coolum Beach has seen heavy development, with new buildings for retail business and holiday apartments.

Lows Lookout is a tourist attraction at the top of Grandview Drive on Toboggan Hill (26.5352°S 153.0907°E).

== Public transport ==
Kinetic Sunshine Coast is contracted to Translink, which operates local buses.

The nearest railway station is Yandina Railway Station. From the Yanida Railway Station, there are Queensland Rail trains to Roma Street railway station in Brisbane, as well as a line to Ipswich and North Gympie.

== Notable people ==
Notable people who are from or have lived in Coolum include:

- Essena O'Neill, internet celebrity who left social media
- Julian Wilson, professional surfer competing in the World Surf League Men's Tour
