= Coolum State High School =

Public school in Coolum Beach, Queensland, Australia

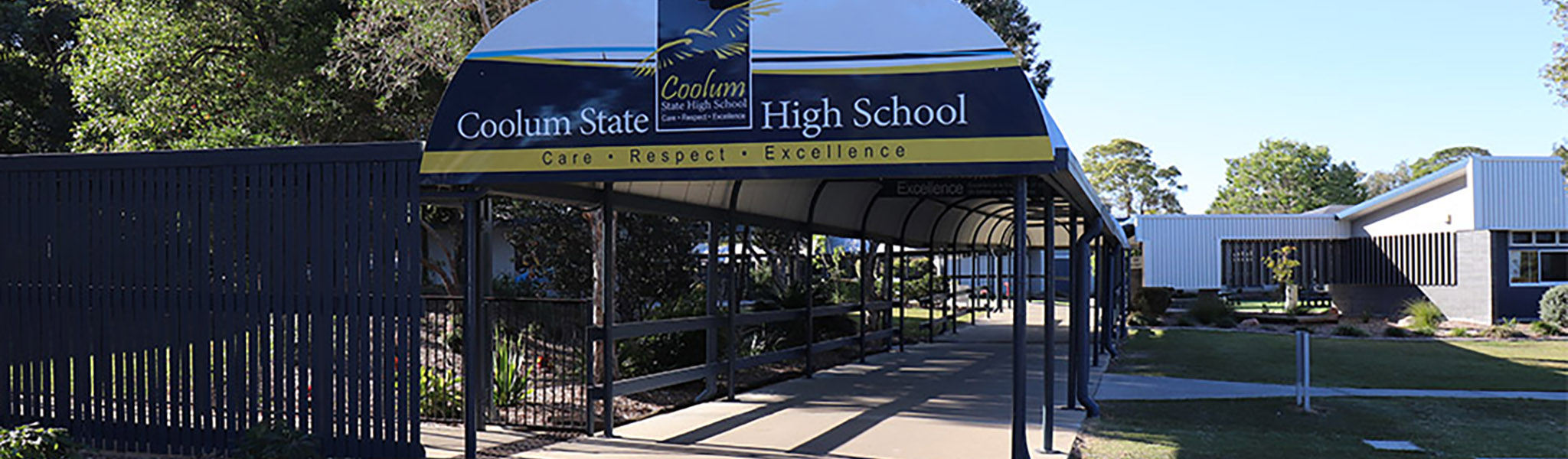

Location
- Havana Road East; Coolum Beach, Queensland; Australia; 26.5005°S 153.086°E

Information
- Type: Public, secondary
- Motto: Care, Respect, Excellence
- Established: 1985
- Principal: Troy Ascott
- Grades: 7–12
- Enrolment: 1112 (2018)
- Colours: Navy blue and gold

Coolum State High School is a coeducational public secondary school based in Coolum Beach in the Sunshine Coast Region of Queensland, Australia.

Since 2017, Coolum State High School's current role of Principal had been held by Troy Ascott. The school also consists of four Deputy Principals, fourteen Heads of Department, two Guidance Officers, one School Chaplain, one School-based Nurse and six Heads of Year.
