= Mechanics' institutes of Australia =

Adult educational establishment in Australia

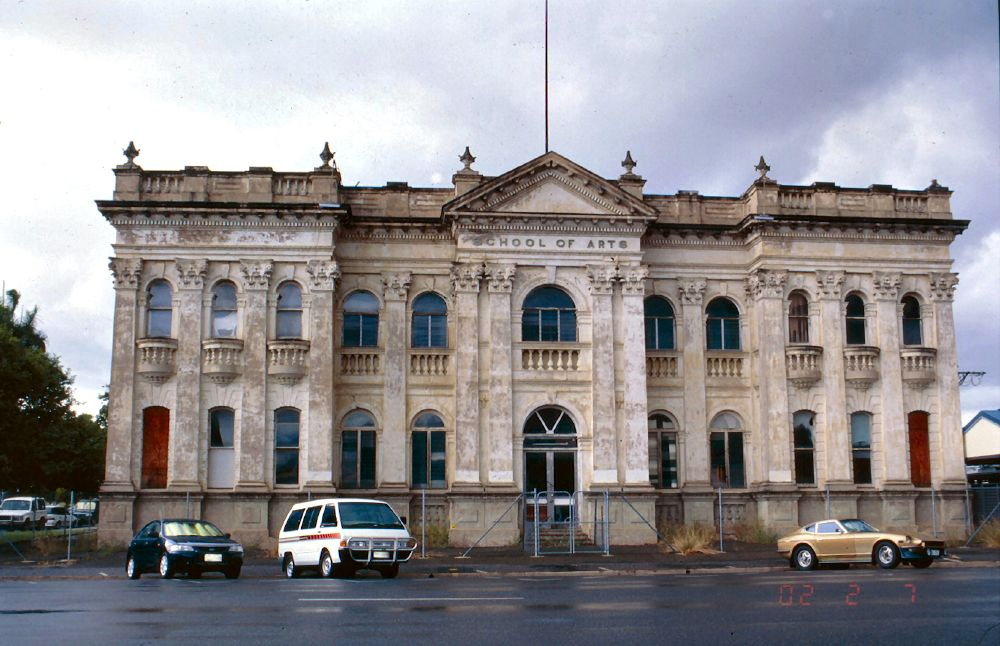
Rockhampton School of Arts, Rockhampton, Qld

Mechanics' institutes were a Victorian-era institution set up primarily to provide adult education, particularly in technical subjects, to working-class men, which spread to the corners of the English-speaking world, including the Australian colonies, where they were set up in virtually every colony. In some places, notably throughout the colonies of Queensland and New South Wales, they were often known as schools of arts.

Most institutes incorporated a library, and many of the old institutes evolved into public lending libraries, while others were converted for other uses or demolished to make way for modern buildings. This article includes a list of many past mechanics' institutes / schools of arts.

== Background ==
The foundations of the movement which created mechanics' institutes were in lectures given by George Birkbeck (1776–1841). His fourth annual lecture attracted a crowd of 500, and became an annual occurrence after his departure for London in 1804, leading to the eventual formation on 16 October 1821 of the first mechanics' institute in Edinburgh, the Edinburgh School of Arts (later Heriot-Watt University). Its first lecture was on chemistry, and within a month it was subscribed to by 452 men who each paid a quarterly subscription fee. This new model of technical educational institution gave classes for working men, and included libraries as well as apparatus to be used for experiments and technical education, and by 1900 there were over 9,000 mechanics institutes around the world.

Mechanics' Institutes were sometimes called schools of arts in the Australian colonies, especially Queensland. The purpose of forming such institutes was to improve the education of working men, and to instruct them in various trades. They were also part of a wider 19th-century movement promoting popular education in Britain, at which time co-operative societies, working men's colleges and the university extension movement were established. The call for popular education in turn can be contextualised within the broader liberal, laissez-faire, non-interventionist philosophy which dominated British social, economic and political ideologies in the 19th century. In this environment, mechanics' institutes flourished as a means by which working men might improve their lot, either through self-education using the reading rooms in the institutes, or by participating in instructional classes organised and funded by institute members.

In Australia, mechanics' institutes were often run by the middle classes. The provision of reading rooms, museums, lectures and classes were still important, but the Australian institutions were also more likely to include a social programme in their calendar of events.

The first mechanics' institute in the Australian colonies was established in Hobart in 1827, followed by the Sydney Mechanics' School of Arts in 1833, Newcastle School of Arts in 1835, then the Melbourne Mechanics' Institute established in 1839 (renamed the Melbourne Athenaeum in 1873). From the 1850s, mechanics' institutes quickly spread throughout Victoria wherever a hall, library or school was needed. Over 1200 mechanics' institutes were built in Victoria but just over 500 remain today, and only six still operated their lending library services as of 2010.

== 21st century revival ==
Across the world, there is a move to sustain and revive mechanics' institutes and related institutions such as athenaeums and schools of art, as subscription libraries, sometimes incorporating or expanding their earlier functions. There have been several worldwide conferences between 2004 and 2021, known as the Mechanics' Worldwide Conference, of representatives of, or people who have an interest in, mechanics' institutes.

In the state of Victoria, a group of Mechanics' Institute representatives met in April 1998 at the institute in Kilmore to exchange information and ideas about the future of their organisations, at a conference entitled Mechanics' Institutes: The Way Forward. From this arose an association, the Mechanics' Institutes of Victoria, whose aim it is for mechanics' institutes to again play an important social and cultural role in their communities, as they did in the past.

== By state ==
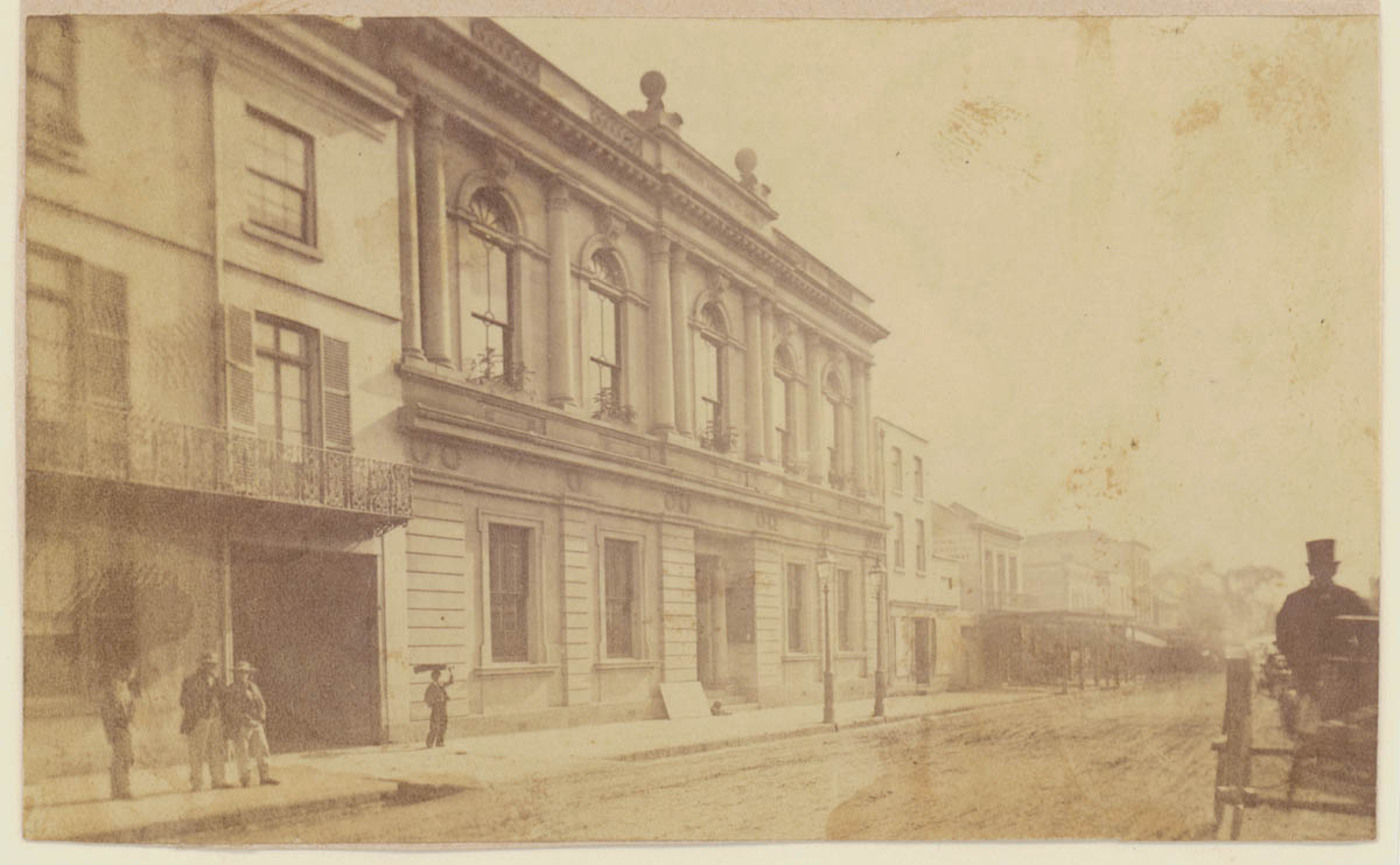
Sydney School of Arts, 1869

=== New South Wales ===
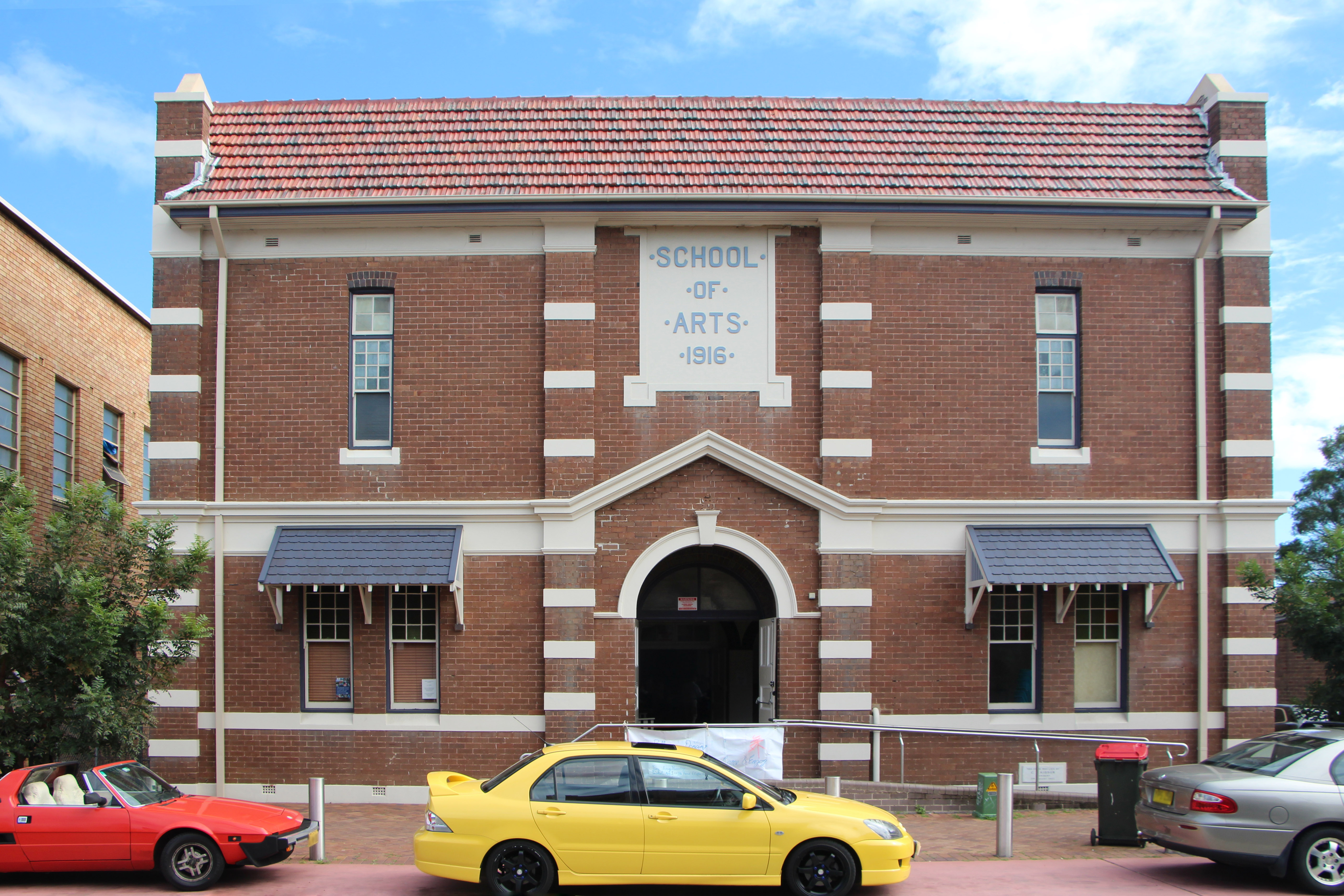
Epping School of Arts

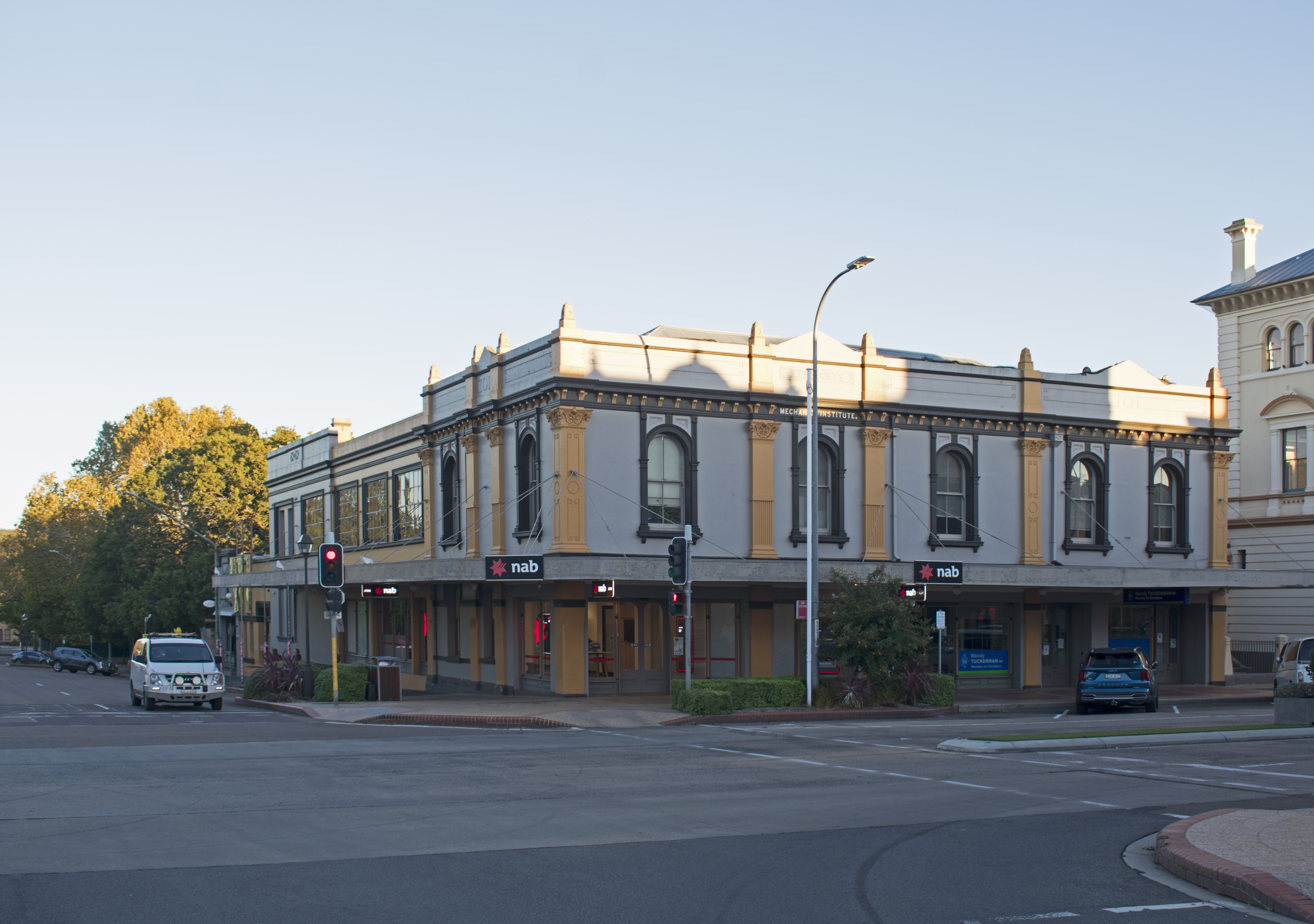
Goulburn Mechanics' institute

The Sydney Mechanics' School of Arts, established in 1833, is the oldest school of arts in continuous operation, and largest in Australia Other institutes in New South Wales include:

- Albury Mechanics' Institute, Albury
- Arncliffe School of Arts hall/Council Hall
- Balmain Workingmen's Institute closed
- Bathurst School of Arts
- Batlow Literary Institute
- Berry School of Arts
- Binalong Mechanics' Institute
- Blacktown School of Arts, established as the Blacktown Mutual Improvement Association (1905)
- Bourke School of Arts
- Braidwood Literary Institute
- Burrawang School of Arts
- Buxton, New South Wales
- Carlingford Mechanics' Institute
- Carlton School of Arts
- Cathcart Literary Institute
- Clarencetown School of Arts
- Mechanic Institute Hall, Cookamidgera
- Cronulla School of Arts
- Epping School of Arts, Epping, New South Wales
- Fairfield School of Arts
- Glebe School of Arts
- Glen Oaks School of Arts
- Goulburn Mechanics' Institute (1853–1946)
- Grafton School of Arts Library
- Granville School of Arts, now a college
- Grenfell Mechanics' Institute, Grenfell
- Guildford Soldiers' Memorial School of Arts
- Gundagai Literary Institute, Gundagai
- Howlong Mechanics' Institute
- Kogarah School of Arts (1886)
- Lawson Mechanics' Institute
- Leichhardt School of Arts hall Hall
- Moruya Mechanics' Institute
- Nelligen Mechanics' Institute, Nelligen
- Newtown School of art
- Oatley School of Arts (1905), Oatley
- Peakhurst School of Arts, Peakhurst
- Penrith School of Arts
- Queanbeyan School of Arts
- Richmond School of Arts
- Rockdale School of Arts
- Rollands Plains School of Arts Hall.
- Rooty Hill School of Arts (1903)
- Rozelle Mechanics' Institute
- St Albans School of Arts hall
- Scone School of Arts, Scone
- Seaham School of Arts
- Singleton Mechanics' Institute
- Sunny Corner School of Arts, Sunny
- Tenterfield School of Arts
- Trundle School of Arts (1914-1923)
- Wagga Wagga School of Arts
- Wentworth Falls School of Arts
- Wilberforce
- Windsor School of Arts, Bridge Street, Thompson Square
- Wingello Mechanics' Institute
- Yass Mechanics' Institute, Yass

Schools of Arts or Literary Institutes once existed at places that are now ghost towns, including, Howell, Reno, and Yambulla.

=== Queensland ===
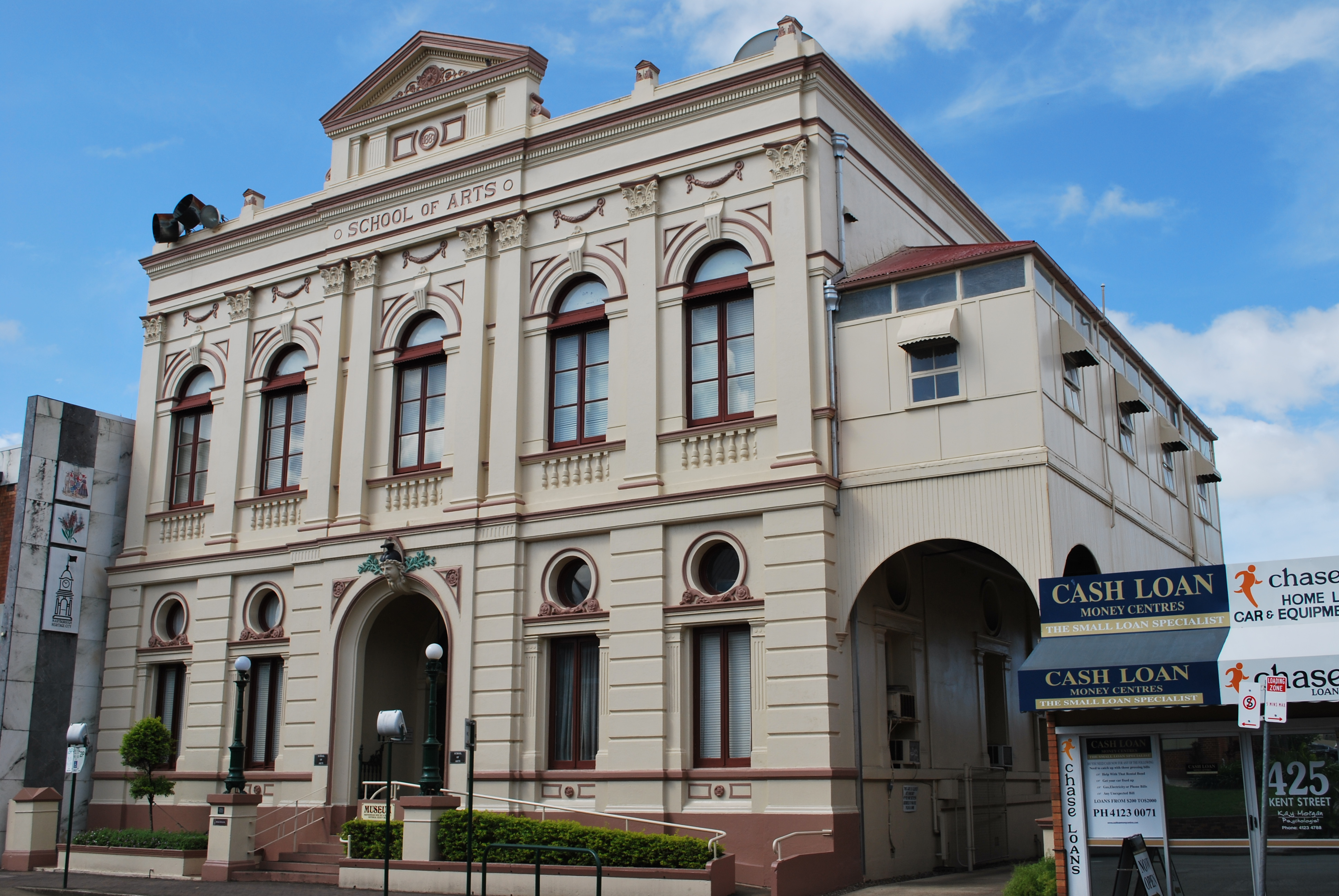
Maryborough School of Arts

- Baree School of Arts
- Brisbane School of Arts
- Bundaberg School of Arts
- Cairns School of Arts (now the Cairns Museum)
- Coorparoo School of Arts
- Eumundi School of Arts (now the Eumundi and District Historical Association)
- Gympie School of Arts (now the Gympie Regional Gallery)
- Herberton School of Arts
- Old Ipswich Town Hall
- Irvinebank School of Arts Hall
- Mackay School of Arts
- Maryborough School of Arts
- Mungungo School of Arts
- Numinbah Valley School of Arts
- Ravenswood School of Arts
- Rockhampton School of Arts
- Townsville School of Arts
- Woody Point Memorial Hall
- Yangan School of Arts

=== South Australia ===
Port Adelaide Institute

There were two iterations of the Adelaide Mechanics' Institute in Adelaide, South Australia. The first was based on the traditional working-men's educational model (founded 1838; merged with Adelaide Literary and Scientific Association and Mechanics' Institute in 1839, folded 1844). The second was led by schoolteacher W.A. Cawthorne, founded in 1847, This organisation merged with the South Australian Library in 1848, creating the Mechanics' Institute and South Australian Library. and was the forerunner of the State Library of South Australia, the South Australian Museum, and the Art Gallery of South Australia.

Between 1847 and 1856, thirteen further institutes came into existence:

- Hindmarsh
- North Adelaide
- Stepney / Norwood
- Glen Osmond
- Gawler
- Gawler
- Mount Barker
- Clarendon
- Willunga
- Woodside
- Port Adelaide Institute
- Port Lincoln
- Port Elliot

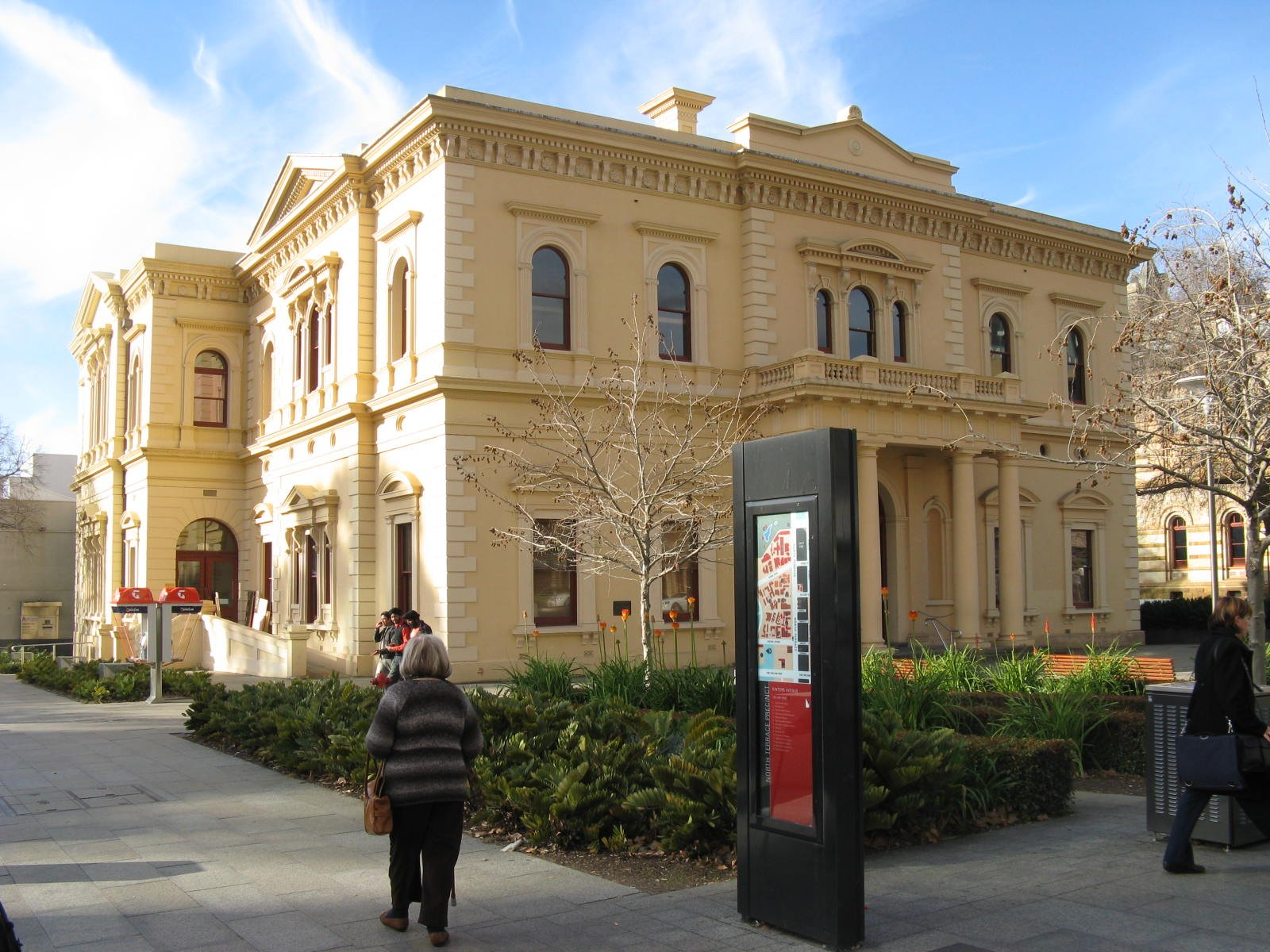
Institute Building, State Library of South Australia, opened 1861

The South Australian Institute, incorporated under the South Australian Institute Act of 1856, became the support and lead organisation for the 350 institutes in South Australia. The Institute Building was designed by Edward Angus Hamilton and officially opened on 29 January 1861.

Later mechanics' institutes in South Australia included:

- Balaklava Institute
- Beachport Institute
- Cambrai Institute
- Cobdogla Institute
- Coonalpyn Institute
- Curramulka Institute
- Dawson Institute
- Dublin Institute
- Edithburgh Institute
- Farrell Flat Institute
- Freeling Institute
- Hamley Bridge Institute
- Karoonda
- Kensington and Norwood Institute
- Macclesfield Institute
- Mannum Institute
- Mintaro Institute

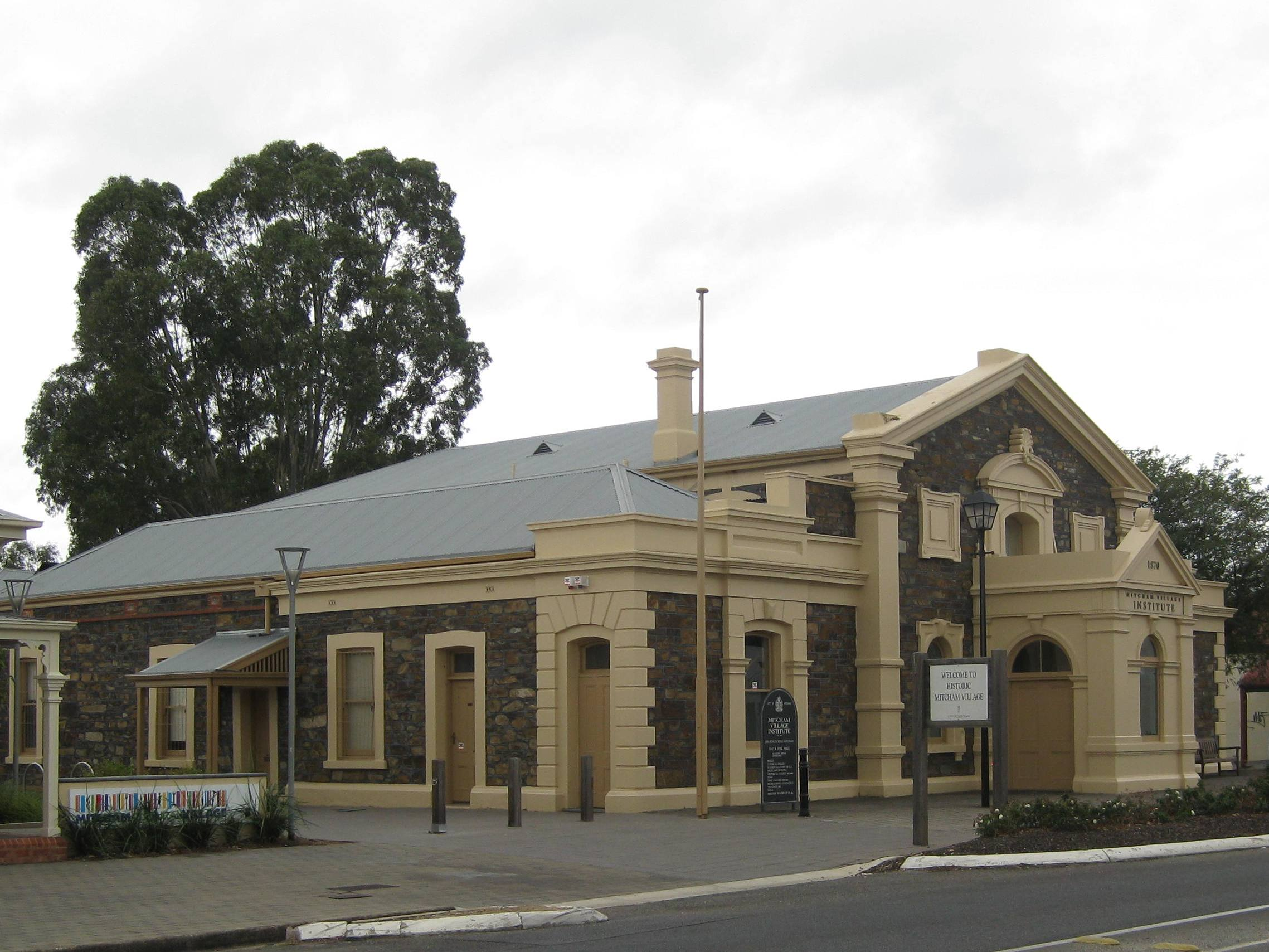
Mitcham Village Institute

- Mitcham Village Institute
- Morgan Institute
- Mount Gambier Institute
- Owen Institute
- Pinnaroo Institute
- Port Vincent Institute
- Ramco Institute
- Saddleworth Institute
- Stansbury Memorial Institute
- Terowie Institute
- Waikerie Institute
- Wasleys Institute

In 1975, the state government phased out funding for the institutes, replacing them with free school-community libraries, while local public libraries were supported by local governments. The Institutes Association ceased to exist in 1988; however, most of the old institute buildings remain, many as heritage-listed buildings.

=== Tasmania ===
- The earliest and most prominent institute ïn Tasmania was Van Diemen's Land Mechanics' Institution, also known as Hobart Town Mechanics' Institute, Hobart (1827–1871), co-founded by George Augustus Robinson. The institute had a shaky start, but after the Presbyterian minister John Lillie became president in 1839, his lectures became very popular, described as "the high-water mark of learning publicly disseminated in the colony". However, it was not attended by working-class men, as the institute had gained a reputation for elitism and paternalism. After going bankrupt, it folded in 1871.
- Launceston Mechanics' Institute, Launceston, co-founded in 1842 by Congregational minister, journalist and historian John West and designed by eminent New Zealand-born architect W. H. Clayton, was a very successful institute. When it was demolished in 1971, its books were given to the public library.

Others included:

- Don Mechanics' Institute, Don, Tasmania
- Ellesmere Mechanics' Institute, Ellesmere (later Scottsdale)
- Emu Bay Mechanics' Institute, Burnie
- Franklin Mechanics' Institute, Franklin
- Huon Mechanics' Institute
- Port Esperance Mechanics' Institute, Port Esperance
- Queenstown Mechanics' Institute, Queenstown
- Ringarooma Mechanics' Institute, Ringarooma
- Waratah Mechanics' Institute, Waratah
- West Hobart Mechanics' Institute, West Hobart (c. 1890), still standing as of 2011

There were other similar institutions, although not called mechanics' institutes, but with similar aims, at Bellerive, Campbell Town, Devon, Glenora, Green Ponds, Hamilton-on-Forth, Lefroy, Oatlands, Sorell, Stanley and Wynyard; and the Tasmanian Society for the Diffusion of Useful Knowledge (Launceston, 1831), the Tasmanian Society for the Acquisition of Useful Knowledge (Hobart Town, 1845), and the Mechanics' School of Arts (Hobart Town, 1850) were also focused on providing similar educational functions.

Most of the institutes in Tasmania became social and cultural centres for the middle classes, including women. Over time, musical performances and various entertainments, such as penny readings took precedence over lectures, and their original educational aims were forgotten. Many of the buildings have however survived, now used as community centres or libraries.

=== Victoria ===
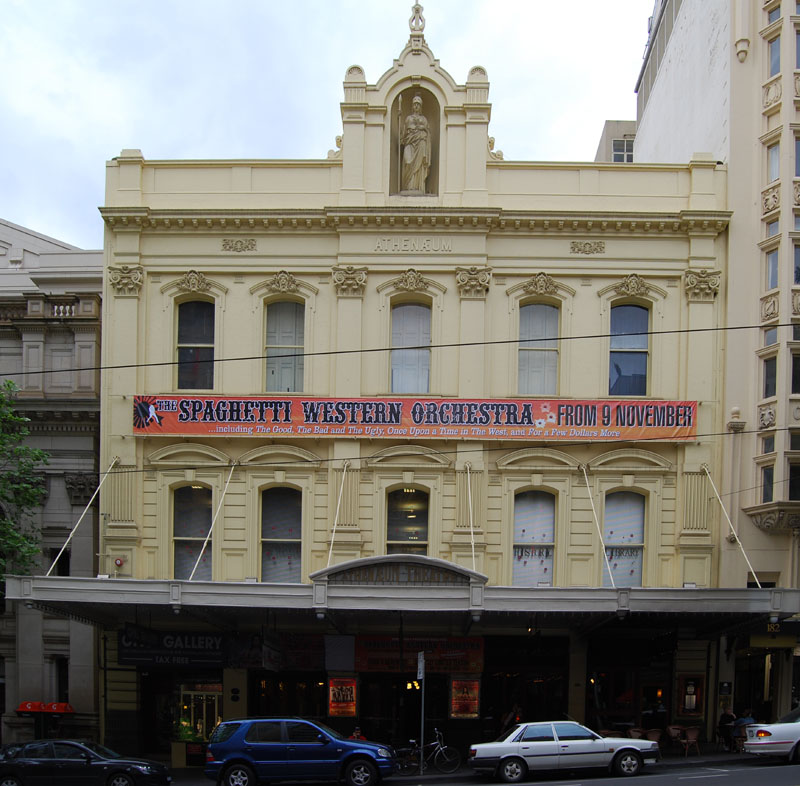
Melbourne Athenaeum

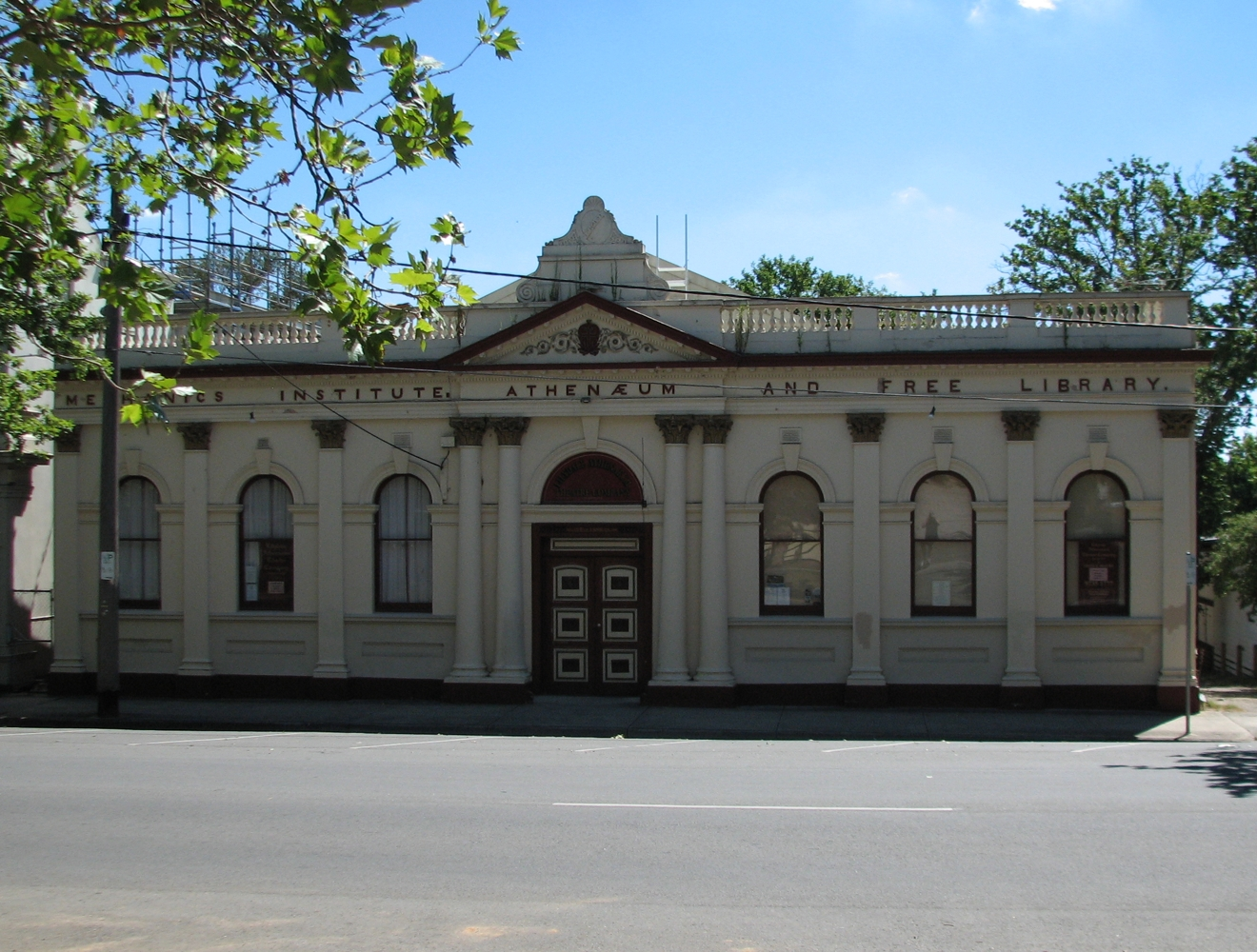
Lilydale Mechanics Institute

Sorrento Institute

Many mechanics' institutes, athenaeums, schools of arts and related institutions are documented by the Mechanics' Institutes of Victoria, Inc., whose members range from the Melbourne Athenaeum to the Moonambel Mechanics' Institute in Moonambel.

Past and present institutes in Victoria include:

- Alexandra School of Arts, Alexandra, Victoria
- Amphitheatre Mechanics' Institute, Amphitheatre
- Ballan Mechanics' Institute, 1860
- Ballarat Mechanics Institute
- Berwick Mechanics Institute and Free Library (1862)
- Bonnie Doon Community Centre
- Briagolong Mechanics' Institute, Briagolong, 1874
- Brunswick, Victoria Mechanics Institute
- Bunyip Mechanics' Institute, 1905
- Burke and Wills Institute, Fryerstown
- Dimboola Mechanics Institute, Dimboola
- Footscray Mechanics' Institute, Footscray
- Glengarry Mechanics' Institute, 1886
- Horsham, Mechanics Institute
- Geelong Mechanics Institute
- Kilmore Mechanics' Institute and Free Library
- Korong Vale Mechanics Institute (Allen Street).
- Kyneton Mechanics Institute
- Lancefield Mechanics' Institute and Free Library
- Little River Mechanics' Institute, Little River
- Long Gully Mechanics Institute
- Longwarry Mechanics' Institute and Free Library, 1886
- Maffra Mechanics' Institute
- Maldon Athenaeum Library
- Malmsbury Mechanics' Institute, 1862
- Meeniyan Mechanics' Institute, 1892
- Melbourne Athenaeum Library
- Melbourne Mechanics Institute now part of the State Library of Victoria
- Penshurst Mechanics Institute, 1871 (expanded 1926)
- Prahran Mechanics' Institute, the only Mechanics' Institute in Victoria which has its own Act of Parliament for its incorporation.
- Port Fairy Library and Lecture Hall, Port Fairy, 1865
- Rosedale Mechanics' Institute, 1863
- Rushworth Mechanics Institute
- Stanley Athenaeum and Public Room
- Stratford Mechanics' Institute, 1866
- Talbot Community Library & Arts Centre
- Wiiliamstown Mechanics Institute
- Tallarook Mechanics Institute
- Trafalgar Mechanics' Institute and Free Library, Trafalgar, 1889
- Toongabbie Mechanics' Institute, 1883
- Upper Maffra Mechanics Institute
- Charlton, Mechanics Institute
- Drysdale Free Library
- Elmhurst Mechanics Institute
- Echuca Mechanics' Institute, Victoria
- Great Western Mechanics Institute
- Healesville Mechanics Institute
- Leongatha Mechanics Institute
- Lilydale Mechanics Institute
- Mornington Mechanics Institute
- Morongla Creek Mechanics Institute Hall
- Murrumburrah § gallery Institute
- Macarthur, Victoria Mechanisc Institute Hall
- Nagambie Mechanics Institute
- Riddells Creek Mechanics Institute
- Narre Warren Mechanics Institute (1891)
- Prahran Mechanics' Institute
- Purlewaugh Mechanics' Institute
- Purnim Mechanics' Institute, Purnim
- Mechanics' Institute, Sorrento
- Romsey Mechanics Institute
- Richmond School of Arts
- Guildford Soldiers Memorial School of Arts
- Cronulla School of Arts
- Carlton School of Arts hall
- Sunny Corner School of Arts.
- Cookamidgera Mechanics Institute.
- Warrandyte Mechnanics' Institute, Warrandyte
- Wambat Mechanics Institute
- Winiam, Shire of Lowan Mechanics Institute Library
- Woodend Mechanics Institute
- Yandoit Mechanics Institute

=== Western Australia ===
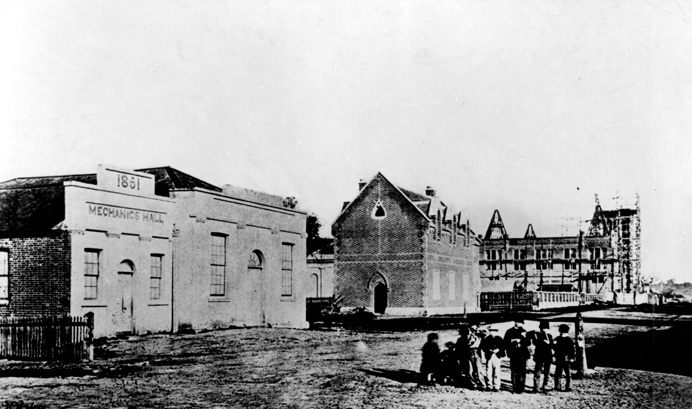
Looking west along Hay Street, the original Swan River MI building

The Swan River Mechanics' Institute, situated in Perth, was the first such organisation formed in the colony on 21 January 1851, followed by the Fremantle Mechanics Institute on 8 August 1851.

Other mechanics' institutes include:

- Albany (1853)
- Bunbury (1867)
- Busselton (1861)
- Greenough (1865)
- Guildford Mechanics' Institute, Guildford, a suburb of Perth (1862)
- Katanning Mechanics' Institute, Katanning
- Northam (1866)
- South Perth Mechanics' Institute, now Old Mill Theatre, South Perth, 1899
- Toodyay (1866)
- York in 1861
