= List of long-distance hiking tracks in Australia =

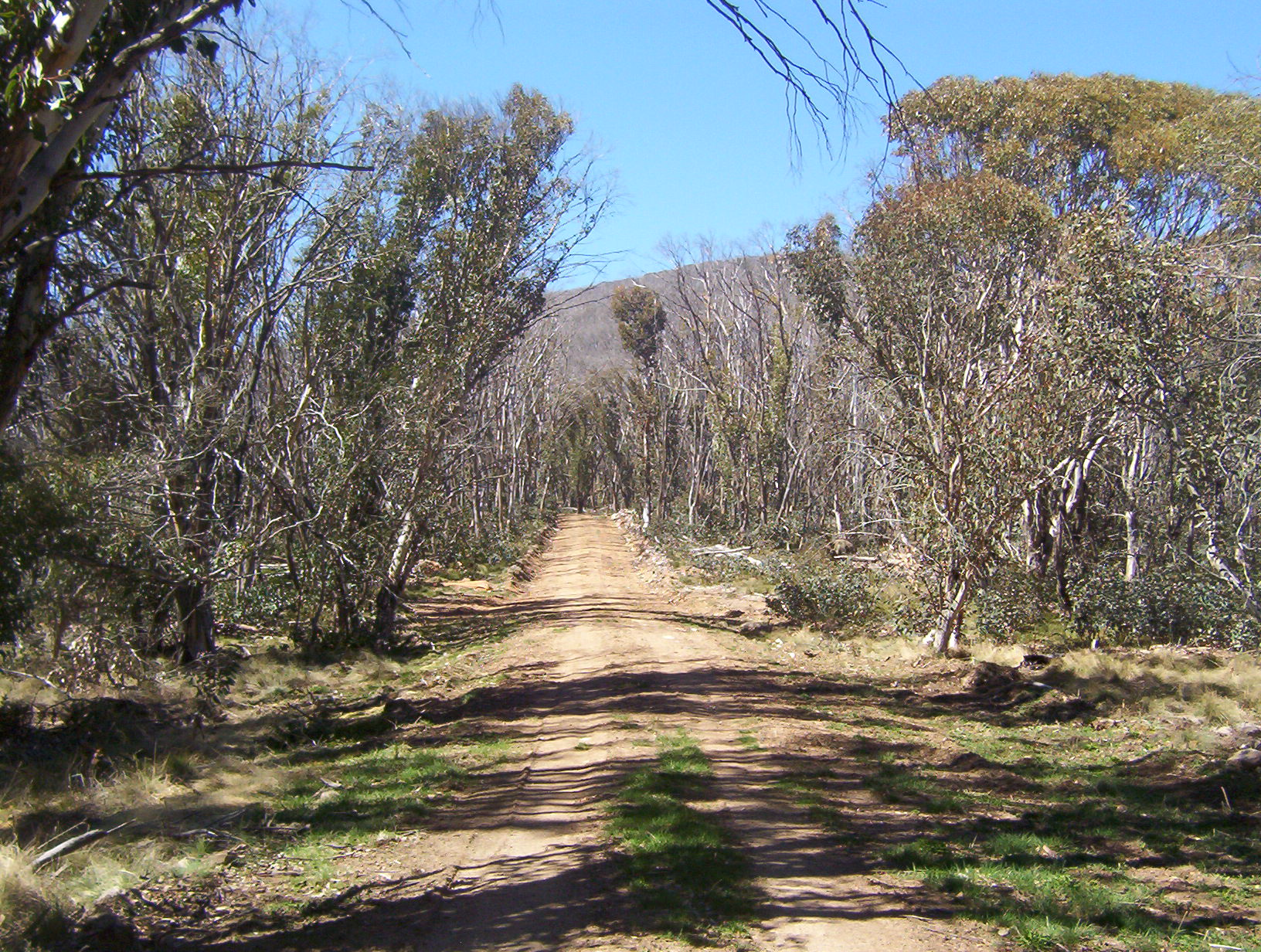
A walking trail in Namadgi National Park in the Australian Capital Territory.

This is a list of published trails in Australia, suitable for walking in three days or longer.

== Trails ==
| Name | State(s) | Distance (km) | Recommended walking time (days) |
|---|---|---|---|
| Australian Alps Walking Track | Vic, NSW, ACT | 683 | 40–60 |
| Bellarine Rail Trail | Vic | 32 | 3–5 |
| Bibbulmun Track | WA | 1,003 | 54 |
| Bicentennial National Trail | Vic, NSW, Qld | 5,330 | 1 year |
| Brisbane Valley Rail Trail | Qld | 161 | 6–8 |
| Cape to Cape Track | WA | 124 | 6–8 |
| Yuraygir Coastal Walk | NSW | 65 | 4 |
| Carnarvon Great Walk | Qld | 86 | |
| Coastal Plains Walk Trail | WA | 55 | 3.5 |
| Cooloola Great Walk | Qld | 102 | 5 |
| East Gippsland Rail Trail | Vic | 96 | |
| Gold Coast Hinterland Great Walk | Qld | 54 | 3 |
| Gold Coast Oceanway | Qld | 36 | 2–5 |
| Grampians Peaks Trail | Vic | 160 | 13 |
| Great Dividing Trail | Vic | 304 | 15–20 |
| Great North Walk | NSW | 250 | 14–16 |
| Great Ocean Walk | Vic | 104 | 8 |
| Great South Coast Walk | NSW, Vic | 660 | 22–30 |
| Great South West Walk | Vic | 250 | 14 |
| Heysen Trail | SA | 1,144 | 55–70 |
| Hume and Hovell Track | NSW | 440 | 24–28 |
| Jatbula Trail | NT | 62 | 4–5 |
| Kangaroo Island Wilderness Trail | SA | 61 | 5 |
| Katoomba to Mittagong Trail | NSW | 132 | 6–8 |
| K'gari (Fraser Island) Great Walk | Qld | 90 | 6–8 |
| Larapinta Trail | NT | 230 | 15–19 |
| Lavender Federation Trail | SA | 212 | 10 |
| Mackay Highlands Great Walk | Qld | 56 | 5 |
| Mawson Trail | SA | 890 | |
| McMillans Track | Vic | 220 | 12–14 |
| Overland Track | Tas | 73 | 5–8 |
| Penguin Cradle Trail | Tas | 83 | 5–7 |
| Port Davey Track | Tas | 65 | |
| Railway Reserve Heritage Trail | WA | 63 | |
| Six Foot Track | NSW | 45 | 3 |
| Scenic Rim Trail | Qld | 47 | 4 |
| South Coast Track | Tas | 82 | 6–8 |
| Stirling Ridge Walk | WA | 29 | 3 |
| Sunshine Coast Hinterland Great Walk | Qld | 58 | 4–6 |
| Tasmanian Trail | Tas | 477 | 25–30 |
| Thorsborne Trail | Qld | 32 | 4–5 |
| Tops to Myall Heritage Trail | NSW | 220 | 11–12 |
| Wet Tropics Great Walk | Qld | 110 | |
| Wilsons Promontory – Northern Circuit | Vic | 58 | 3–4 |
| Whitsunday Great Walk | Qld | 30 | 2–3 |
| Yurrebilla Trail | SA | 54 | 3–5 |

== See also ==
- List of long-distance trails
- List of people who have walked across Australia

== Notes ==
- http://www.john.chapman.name/longwlk2.html
- https://web.archive.org/web/20091024095218/http://www.derm.qld.gov.au/parks_and_forests/great_walks/index.html
