= Yurrebilla Trail =

Walking trail in South Australia

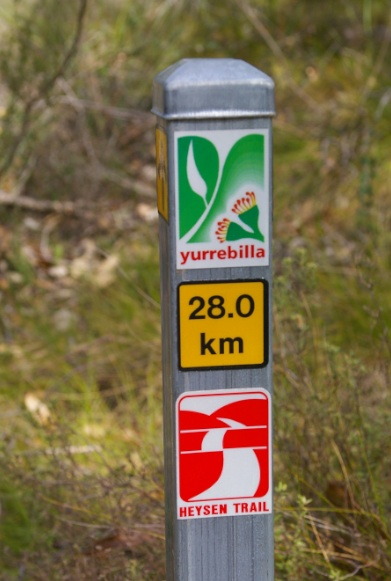
- Trail marker on a section shared with the Heysen Trail
- Length: 54 km (34 mi)
- Location: South Australia
- Established: 2 September 2003
- Trailheads: Belair railway station & Ambers Gully
- Use: Hiking

The Yurrebilla Trail is a walking trail passing through the Mount Lofty Ranges in the Adelaide hills area of Adelaide, South Australia, to the east of the Adelaide city centre.

The name probably derives from the Kaurna name Yuridla, meaning "two ears", which refers to the peaks of Mount Lofty and Mount Bonython; the same word which gave rise to the naming of Uraidla.

The trail is 54 km (34 mi) long and runs from Belair railway station (at Belair National Park) in the south to the River Torrens at Ambers Gully in the north. Mostly traversing the hills face, it also passes through Cleland National Park and the upper section of Horsnell Gully Conservation Park, as well as Giles, Morialta, and Black Hill conservation parks, and scales the summit of Mount Lofty. Much of the trail consists of old footpads, fire tracks, road reserves, and roads rebadged, with the trail marked along them, linking to form a coherent trail from north to south along with newly-created sections. Panoramic views of the city and Adelaide Plains are to be had from every section. It was officially opened on 2 September 2003.

The trail is divided into one full-day and four half-day sections:

- Belair Railway Station to Eagle On The Hill (17.5 km)
- Eagle-on-the-Hill to Summertown (7 km)
- Summertown to Norton Summit (9 km)
- Norton Summit to Morialta (7.5 km)
- Morialta to Ambers Gully (River Torrens) (13 km)

== See also ==
- List of long-distance hiking tracks in Australia
