= Numinbah Valley =

- Suburb
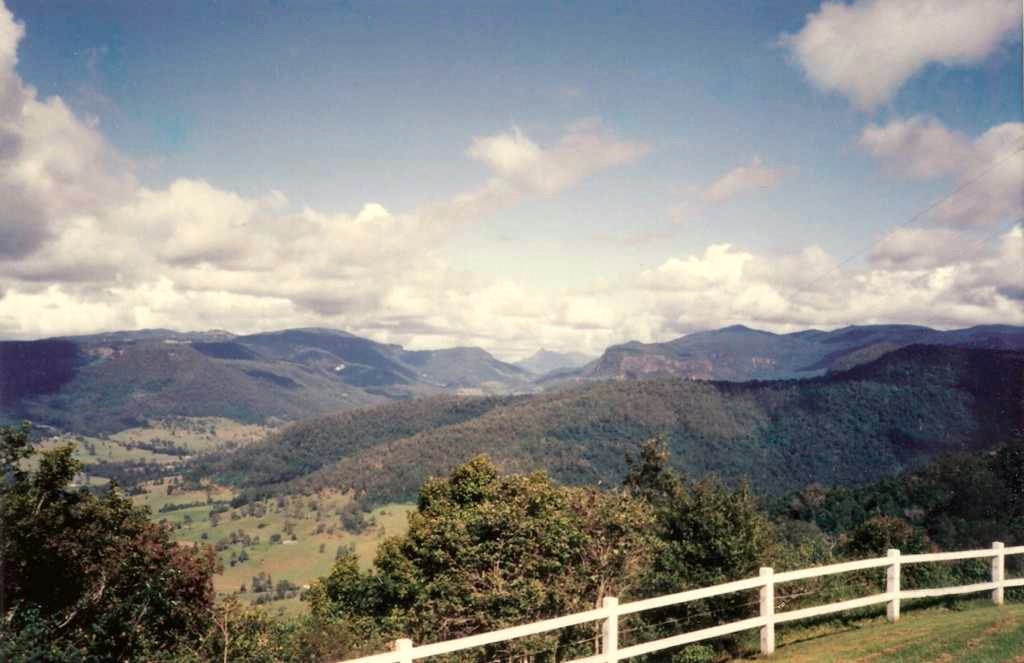
- Numinbah Valley from Rosin's Lookout

- Interactive map of Numinbah Valley
- Coordinates: 28.1472°S 153.2302°E
- Country: Australia
- State: Queensland
- City: Gold Coast
- LGA: City of Gold Coast
- Location: 24.6 km (15.3 mi) SW of Nerang; 35.1 km (21.8 mi) SW of Southport; 36.1 km (22.4 mi) SW of Surfers Paradise; 96 km (60 mi) SSE of Brisbane
- Established: 1880

Government
  - State electorate: Mudgeeraba
  - Federal division: McPherson

Area
  - Total: 58.3 km^{2} (22.5 sq mi)

Population
  - Total: 212 (2021 census)
  - Density: 3.636/km^{2} (9.418/sq mi)
- Time zone: UTC+10:00 (AEST)
- Postcode: 4211
Suburbs around Numinbah Valley
Beechmont	Advancetown	Neranwood
Beechmont	Numinbah Valley	Springbrook
Natural Bridge	Natural Bridge	Springbrook

Numinbah Valley is a rural locality in the City of Gold Coast, Queensland, Australia. In the 2021 census, Numinbah Valley had a population of 212 people.

== Geography ==
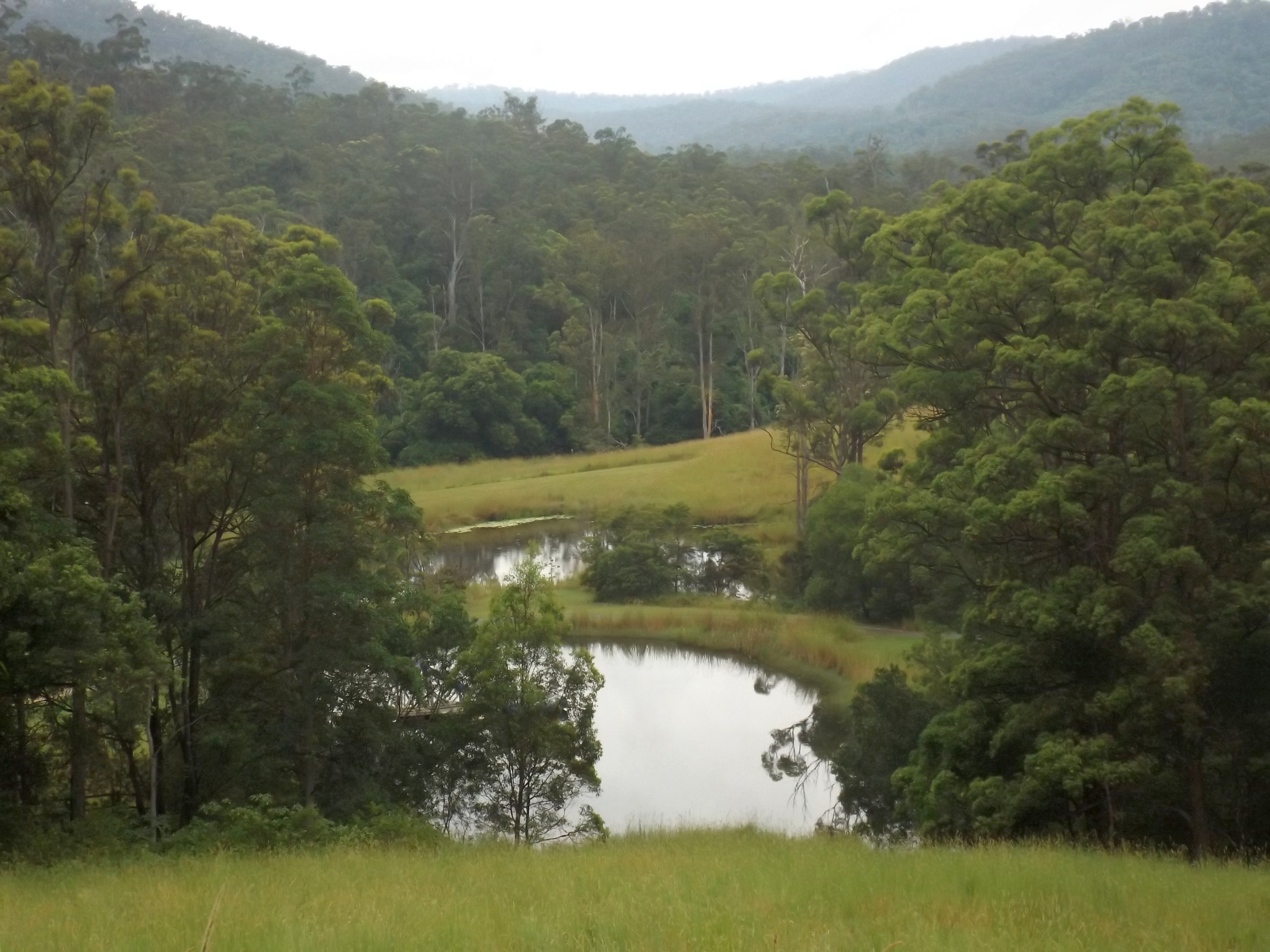
Dams along Pocket Road, 2016

The Numinbah Valley is a valley and locality in the Gold Coast hinterland in South East Queensland. This Scenic Rim valley covers 116 km^{2} and contains cleared grazing land, rocky outcrops, waterfalls, rainforest walks and good hinterland scenery. Lonely Planet has described the valley as the most beautiful in South East Queensland.

Compared to other areas of the Gold Coast the Numinbah Valley has remained largely undeveloped in recent decades. To the east is the Springbrook plateau. On the eastern side of the valley is the Natural Bridge in Springbrook National Park and to the west lies the Lamington Plateau and the Lamington National Park. To the south is the Tweed Valley in northern New South Wales.

Vegetation in the valley includes dry and wet sclerophyll forest. The valley is part of the upper catchment area for the Nerang River which flows into the Hinze Dam in the lowest elevated and most northern part of the valley. The communities of Advancetown and the small township of Numinbah are located in Numinbah Valley.

The river which lies in the Numinbah valley region is home to the duck billed platypus. The platypus is regularly seen in Bonchow park and Forest park in Numinbah valley. recent studies show that most of the platypus population on the Gold Coast lies in Numinbah valley and Canungra fresh water streams including Scenic Rim suburbs such as Palen Creek, Rathdowney, Mount Barney and surrounding suburbs.

The Nerang–Murwillumbah Road runs through from north to south.

== History ==
The valley was first explored by timber cutters seeking cedar in 1845. Bullocks hauled the felled timber to Nerang. Later in the 1860s, when a route to the Tweed Valley was discovered as surveyors mapped the Queensland/New South Wales border, settlers moved into the area.

A township developed in the 1880s. A sawmill operated from 1909 until 1944 when agriculture and dairying became the primary industries.

Numinbah Provisional School opened on 7 February 1927. In 1938 it became Numinbah Valley State School.

== Demographics ==
In the 2016 census, Numinbah Valley had a population of 218 people. In the 2021 census, Numinbah Valley had a population of 212 people.

== Economy ==
At one of three places in Queensland perlite is extracted from a deposit in the valley and trucked to Sydney.

== Facilities ==
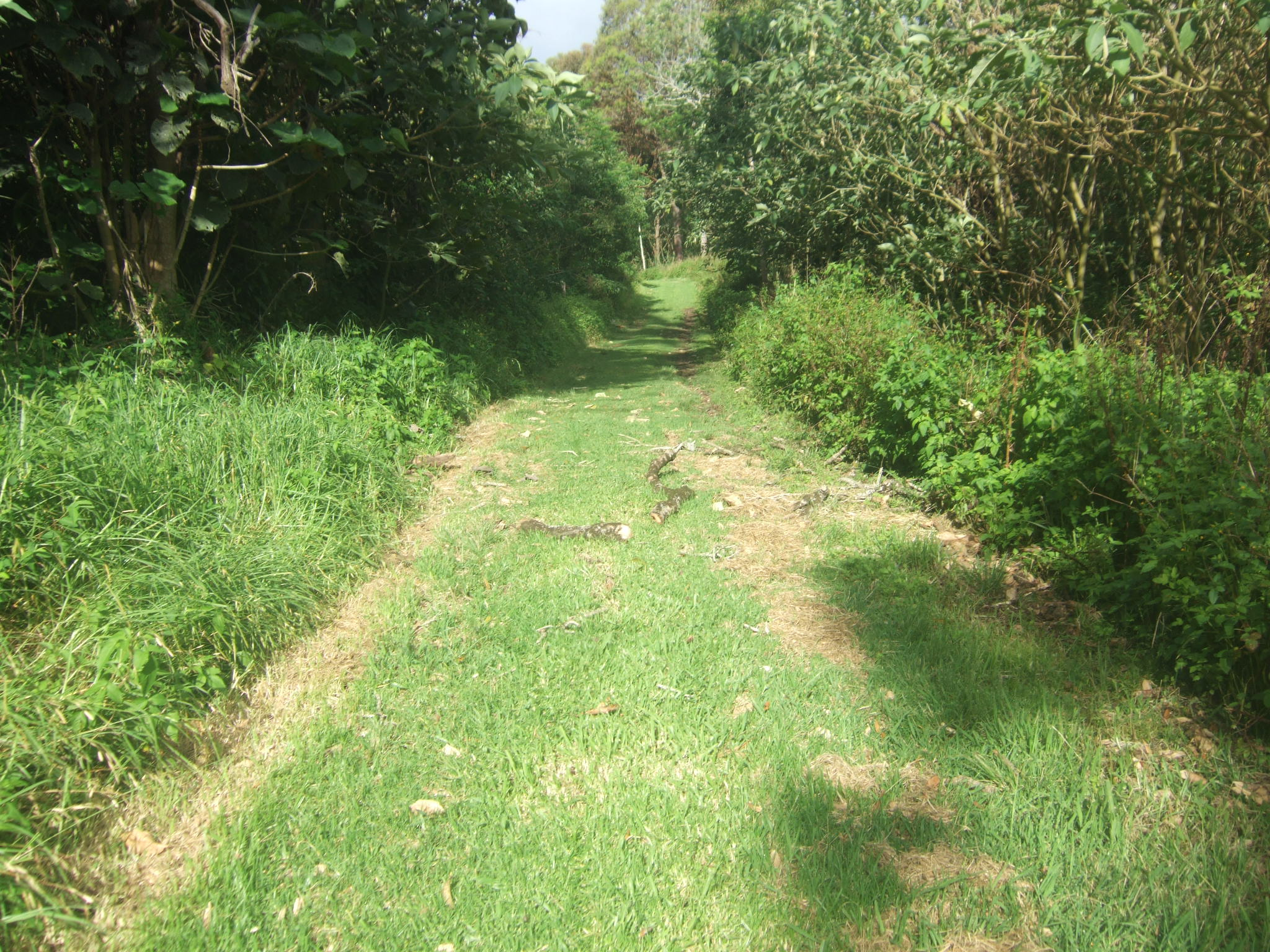
The Gold Coast Hinterland Great Walk

The Numinbah Correctional Centre is located within the locality.

== Community groups ==
A Numinbah Valley Landcare group operates in the valley.

== Education ==
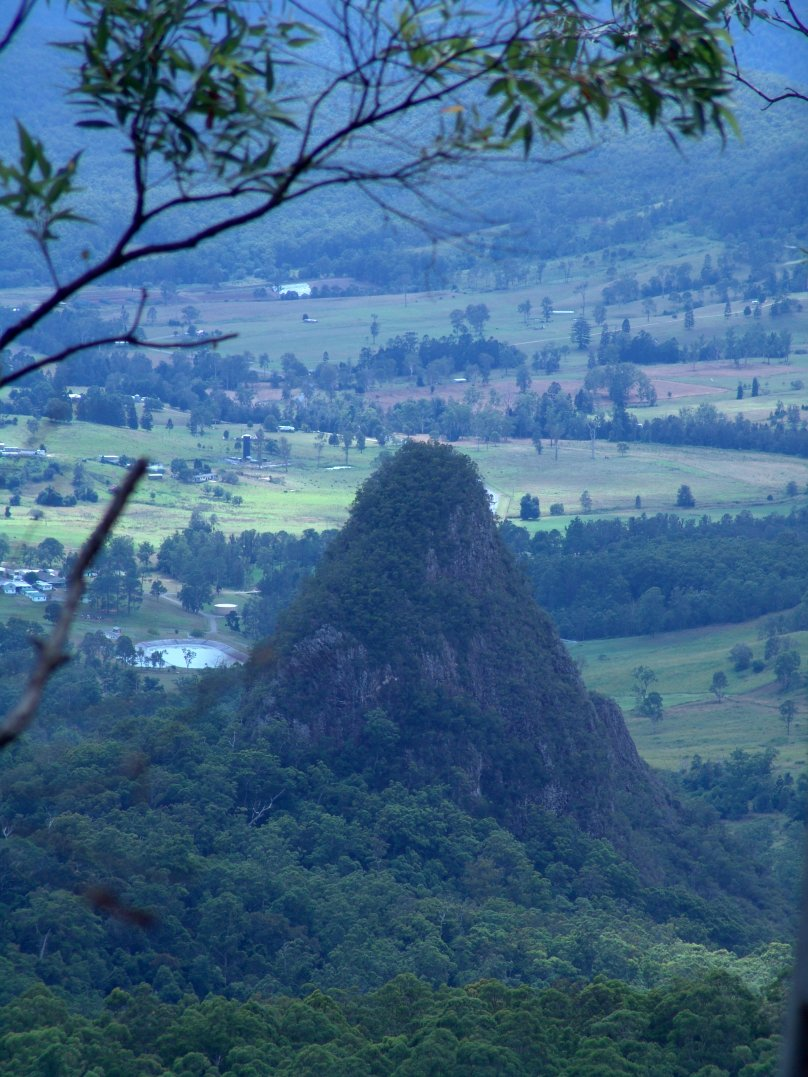
Egg Rock, from Binna Burra

Numinbah Valley State School is a government primary (Prep–6) school for boys and girls at 2270 Nerang–Murwillumbah Road (28.1486°S 153.2272°E). In 2017, the school had an enrolment of 14 students with 7 teachers (2 full-time equivalent) and 4 non-teaching staff (2 full-time equivalent).

Numinbah Valley Environmental Education Centre is an Outdoor and Environmental Education Centre at 1721 Nerang–Murwillumbah Road (28.1096°S 153.2437°E).

There is no secondary school in Numinbah Valley. The nearest government secondary school is Nerang State High School in Nerang to the north-east.

== Attractions ==
The Gold Coast Hinterland Great Walk traverses the valley from O'Reilly's Guesthouse in the west to Springbrook National Park to the east.

Bornhoffen PCYC or the Numinbah Valley Environmental Education Centre caters for large groups of students. These large recreational facilities are situated in the southern and highest part where the headwaters of the Nerang River coalesce.

== Heritage listings ==
Numinbah Valley has a number of heritage-listed sites, including:

- 365 Chesters Road: Banana Packing Shed
- 2136 Nerang Murwillumbah Road: Numinbah Valley School of Arts

== See also ==
- Fassifern Valley
- List of valleys of Australia
- Lockyer Valley
- Samford Valley
