= Giles Conservation Park =

Protected area in South Australia

- IUCN category III (natural monument or feature)
- Location within South Australia
- Location: South Australia
- Nearest city: Norton Summit
- Coordinates: 34°56′4.405″S 138°43′21.19″E
- Area: 1.09 km^{2} (0.42 sq mi)
- Established: 30 September 2007
- Governing body: Department for Environment and Water
- Website: Official website

Giles Conservation Park is a protected area in the Australian state of South Australia located approximately 10 km (6.2 mi) east of the state capital of Adelaide. It was declared in 2007 and has an area of 109 ha (270 acres). Previously, the land was the eastern portion of the Horsnell Gully Conservation Park. It was named after the family of Charles Giles, who is reported as being a pioneer in the fields of horticulture and floriculture in South Australia.

The conservation park features remnant native vegetation and native animals such as western grey kangaroos and koalas. It features one walking trail that is part of the Mount Lofty to Norton Summit portion of the Heysen and Yurrebilla trails. The official brochure suggests that the conservation park offers "excellent opportunities for bushwalking, birdwatching, photography, painting and nature study".

The conservation park is classified as an IUCN Category III protected area.

== See also ==
- Protected areas of South Australia
