= Eumundi School of Arts =

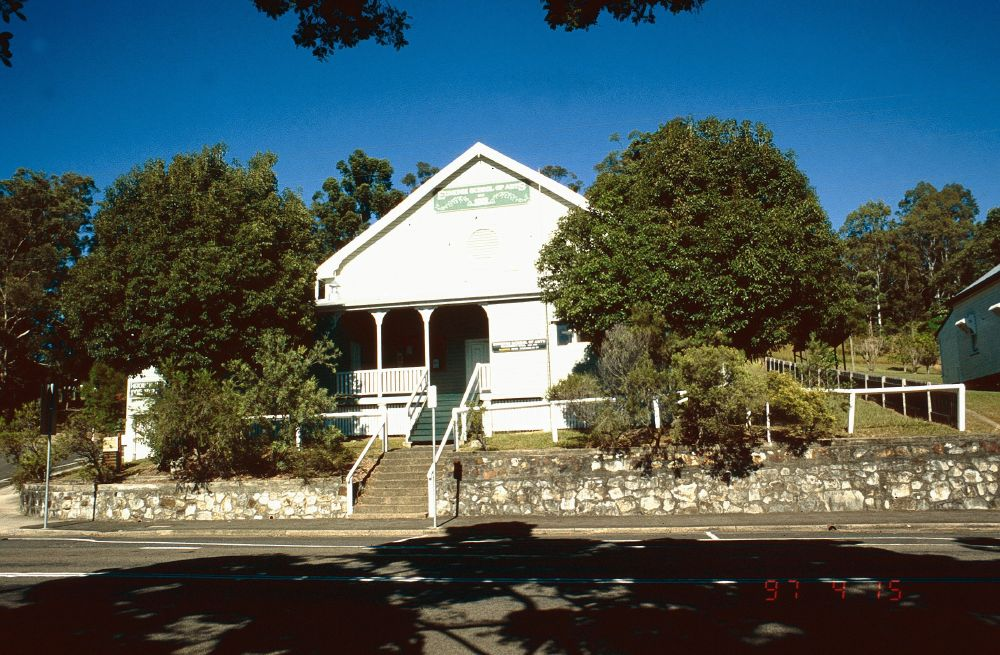
- Eumundi School of Arts, 1997

- Location within Queensland Location within Australia
- 26.4784°S 152.9527°E
- Location: 63 Memorial Drive, Eumundi, Sunshine Coast Region, Queensland, Australia

History
- Design period: 1900–1914 (early 20th century)
- Built: 1912

Site notes
- Architect: William David Fenwick
- Architectural style: Classicism

Queensland Heritage Register
- Official name: Eumundi School of Arts
- Type: state heritage (built)
- Designated: 24 March 2000
- Reference no.: 601658
- Significant period: 1910s (historical); 1910s–1920s (fabric); 1912–ongoing (social)
- Significant components: school of arts
- Builders: William Henry Bytheway

Eumundi School of Arts is a heritage-listed school of arts at 63 Memorial Drive, Eumundi, Sunshine Coast Region, Queensland, Australia. It was designed by William David Fenwick and built in 1912 by William Henry Bytheway. It was added to the Queensland Heritage Register on 24 March 2000.

== History ==
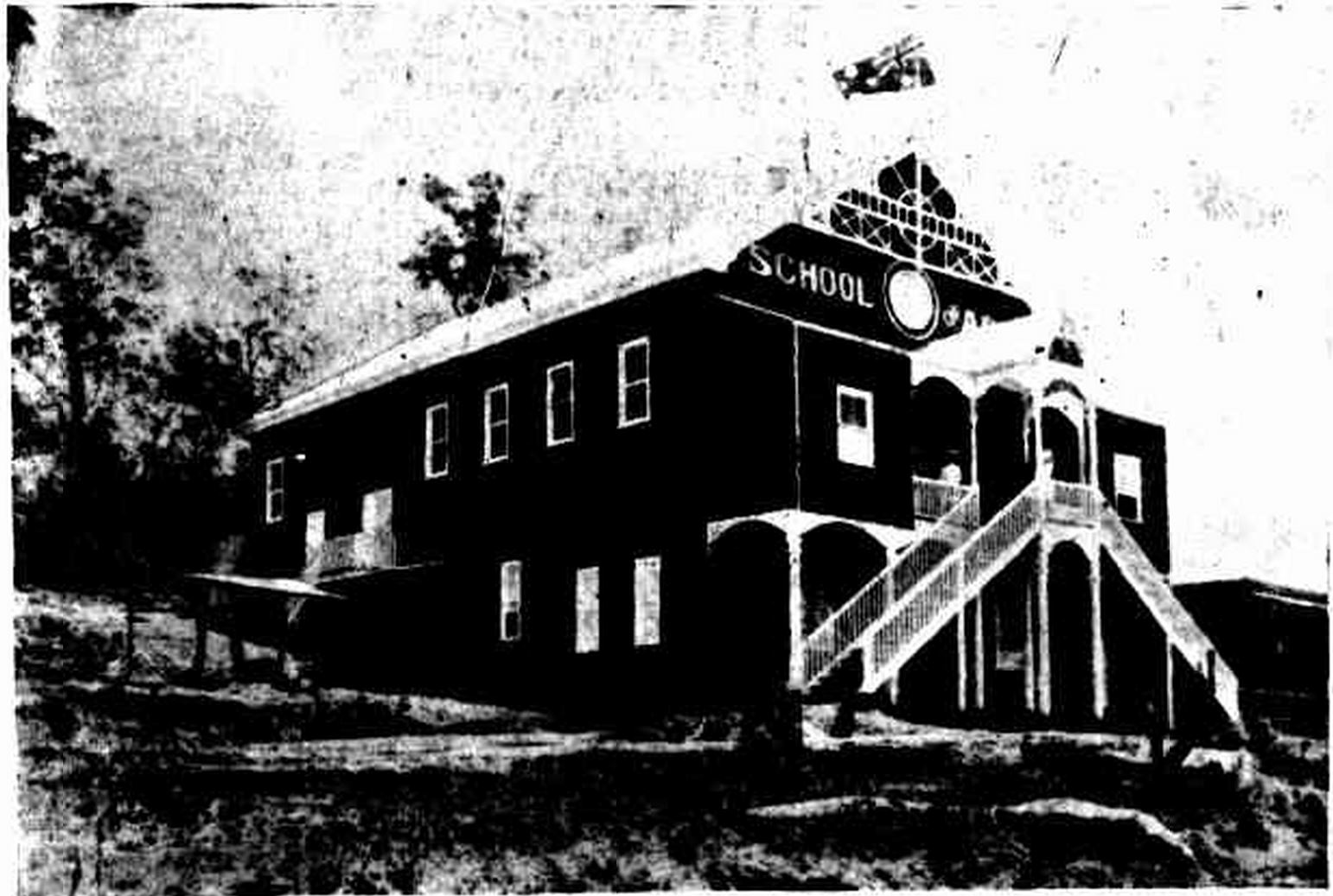
Eumundi School of Arts, 1912

The Eumundi School of Arts, the second to be built on the site, was constructed in 1912 by W Bytheway, a builder from Gympie. At the time, Eumundi was one of a number of small but prosperous Sunshine Coast hinterland towns servicing a timber, dairy and pastoral industry.

Joseph Gridley, the first selector in the North Maroochy River district, arrived at Moreton Bay in 1856 on the James Fernie with his wife Ellen and five children. In 1877, Gridley selected Portion 70, where the Hall now stands, for timber getting.

In 1886 the Queensland Government proposed a township at Eumundi as a station on the railway line between Brisbane and Maryborough. Residential land was auctioned in 1890, and the rail line was opened in 1891. The rail stop serviced the Eumundi timber getting area where selectors, including the Gridleys, had selected land during the 1870s. By 1893 a local provisional school was operating. Dairy farmers started arriving in the area during the 1900s, either by overlanding their stock or accompanying them north on the railway.

In May 1905, the County of Canning, Parish of Maroochy, Town of Eumundi allocated Reserve Land Allotment 5, Section 2 for the hall by Proclamation. The allotment to be set apart was "situated opposite the most southerly gate of the Eumundi railway station yards upon a ridge...The site is a fine one for building purposes, and in every way suitable for a public building. The Association propose to build a Hall by subscription to be used for public meetings and associations". A single-storey timber hall was constructed by Peter Denholm on the site in 1908.

After only four years however, the burgeoning community needed more space and Gympie builder, W Bytheway, built a second hall in beech timber and iron roof on the same site, replacing the first Hall. It can "best be described as a big Hall with stage at back, and a couple of anterooms at the front, having a library, wide passage, and reading room under the front, and supper room under the centre". The Hall was officially opened on 15 November 1912 when "The programme included a two days bazaar... the whole to be started by the official opening of the splendid new building... A first glance was permitted... to the party accompanying the Honourable JW Blair, Minister of Education. The building was planned by W Fenwick of Cooroy". The hall was constructed at a cost of £1000.

According to social commentator, AH Corrie, writing in the Nambour Chronicle in January 1919, Eumundi was quite prosperous with two hotels, two stores, three churches, a large public hall, library and billiard table. He believed Eumundi's School of Arts was one of the "largest and best appointed buildings of its kind on the North Coast Line between Brisbane suburbs and Gympie".

Reconstruction was considered essential when the School of Arts was damaged by termites, worsening by 1931. By 1950, the Hall was condemned and a ball was cancelled. In 1953, the building was restumped with cement blocks, however, more termite damage occurred during 1964 at the rear of the building. Tenders were called in 1964 for the lowering of the Hall which was "in bad repair and is so high is costly to renovate". The damage was so advanced that in 1968 the lower level was removed to save the rest of the building and the twin-spitter front steps were replaced by single steps. At this time, the Eerwah Vale Hall and stumps were incorporated into Eumundi's hall.

The Government increased the School of Arts Reserve to include Allotments 6 and 7 in 1967 to allow for parking spaces. The Eumundi & District Historical Association (E&DHA) was appointed as School of Arts Trustees in 1989. The School of Arts is still the focus for many of Eumundi's social and cultural activities.

== Description ==
Eumundi School of Arts is situated on a treed ridge on the lower side of Memorial Drive. The single-storey, timber building with gabled, corrugated iron roof, sits on concrete stumps. Externally, the building is clad with chamferboard, with the exception of weatherboards at the rear of the building. Also at the rear of the hall is a pair of double doors and smaller door at the back of the stage, covered by tin The front, or eastern facade, has an asymmetrical veranda with timber posts and brackets. The decorative bargeboard and finial have been removed and covered with chamferboards, however, the circular, ventilated opening remains. The porch ceiling is of tongue and groove boards, the remainder is unlined. Leading onto the veranda are two doors either side, which lead to storage areas, and a central, panelled timber door.

Internally, in the storage room located at the southern end of the building is a set of stairs which lead to the projection room. From this room, a door leads to the 1968 addition. This area now houses a kitchen. Both two storage rooms located at the front of the hall still have extant viewing slots. In the 1960s, these slots were used by the ticket collectors to watch the movies.

The main hall is rectangular with crow's ash flooring. It is divided by the support beams of the addition to its southern side. The main hall has two raked timber ceilings with latticed air vents (one partially obscured) and six large, sashed windows which open top and bottom, on its northern wall. Four louvered airvents (windows) have been recently installed at floor level below the original windows. A trapdoor to the right hand side of the stage was used to access the lower floor pre-1968. A single door, located near the stage, allows southern external access.

On the eastern side, the main hall area has a half-timbered VJ wall and a fibro upper to the ceiling. The remainder of the hall is VJ lined. Two inside doors were sealed c. 1968, one near the old RSL door located at the front of the building and another on the other side of the main entrance door. The stage is accessed by two wooden steps. Vertical timberwork now fronts the top of the stage, partly concealing one of the latticed air vents in the roof. A small, heavily latticed bar (formed by enclosing the rear of the addition) with a pulldown hatch and lockable door is accessed on the left prior to ascending the steps to toilet facilities at the southern end of the building. The southern wall of the hall's addition has six window openings.

Emergency exit doors, and sidesteps leading down from the kitchen door's southern landing, access the carpark in Pacey Street. Part of the slope at the hall's rear was excavated to provide building access and space. Several macadamised parking spaces abut its southern side, extending to a secondary side road.

== Heritage listing ==
Eumundi School of Arts was listed on the Queensland Heritage Register on 24 March 2000 having satisfied the following criteria.

The place is important in demonstrating the evolution or pattern of Queensland's history.

The Eumundi School of Arts is important in demonstrating the pattern and evolution of Queensland's history, being an important component of the cultural life of the Eumundi community as a school of arts and public library. Constructed in 1912, the second hall to be built on the site, the Eumundi School of Arts demonstrates the growth of the town following the opening up of the area through timber getting and dairying and through the construction of the railway in 1891.

The place is important because of its aesthetic significance.

The Eumundi School of Arts is of aesthetic significance as a single-storey, timber, vernacular public building forming an integral part of the historical main street of Eumundi and is distinguished by its visual cohesion with other historical buildings along Memorial Drive, which incorporates the Eumundi War Memorial Trees.

The place has a strong or special association with a particular community or cultural group for social, cultural or spiritual reasons.

As the centre of Eumundi's social and cultural activities for almost ninety years, the School of Arts has strong social significance for the people of Eumundi and surrounding areas. Internally, the Hall houses the District's memorial plaque listing the names of 87 Eumundi men who fought in World War I.
