= Numinbah Correctional Centre =

Open prison in Queensland, Australia

Coordinates: 28°09′48″S 153°12′45″E

- Interactive map of Numinbah Correctional Centre
- Location: Numinbah Valley, Queensland
- Status: Operational
- Security class: Open (Male/Female)
- Capacity: 104 (25 female)

Numinbah Correctional Centre is an open prison on a 1,800-acre (7.3 km^{2}) reserve 100 km south of Brisbane in the Numinbah Valley.

The centre houses female prisoners, a mix of short and long-term.

It runs different programmes on parenting, addiction recovery and higher education. It has a primary health clinic open 7 days a week, nurse led in collaboration with a local GP.

== See also ==
- List of Australian Prisons
