= Eumundi War Memorial Trees =

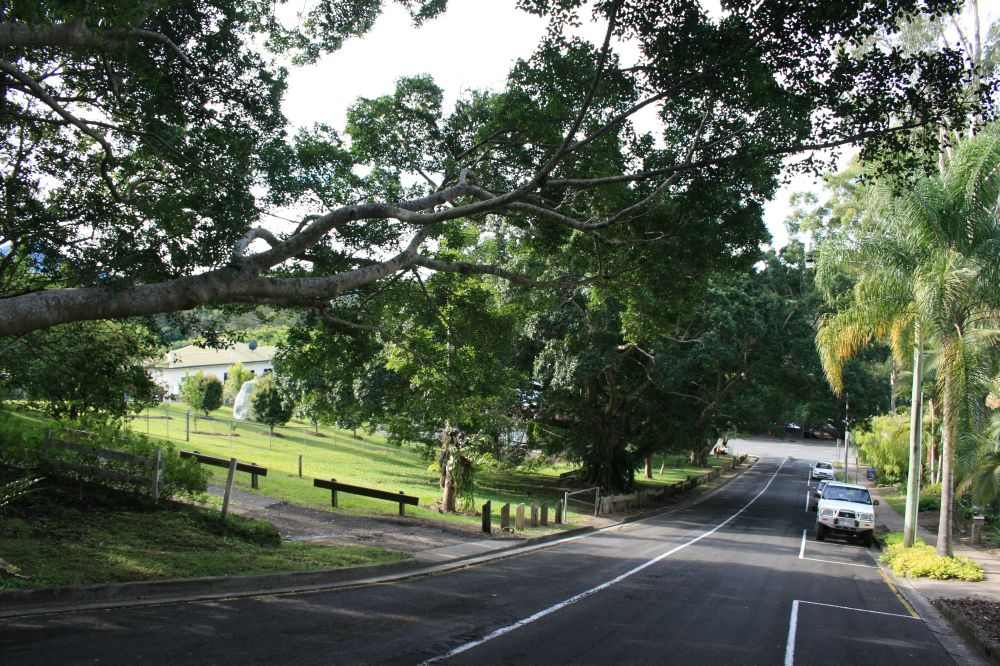
- Eumundi War Memorial Trees, 2009

- Location within Queensland Location within Australia
- 26.4775°S 152.9523°E
- Location: Memorial Drive, Eumundi, Sunshine Coast Region, Queensland, Australia

History
- Design period: 1914–1919 (World War I)
- Built: 1917 onwards

Queensland Heritage Register
- Official name: Eumundi War Memorial, Trees in Memorial Drive
- Type: state heritage (landscape)
- Designated: 5 December 1997
- Reference no.: 601122
- Significant period: 1914–18 (social, fabric, historical); 1979 (fabric)
- Significant components: memorial – tree/avenue of trees, tree groups – avenue of, memorial – plaque

The Eumundi War Memorial Trees is a heritage-listed memorial avenue of trees at Memorial Drive, Eumundi, Sunshine Coast Region, Queensland, Australia. It was built in 1917 onwards. It is also known as Trees in Memorial Drive. It was added to the Queensland Heritage Register on 5 December 1997.

== History ==
The Eumundi War Memorial Trees were planted during and after the First World War. Between 1914 and 1918, eighty-seven men from Eumundi and the surrounding district served in the First World War. The trees were planted to honour the twenty men who did not return. The first trees were ceremonially planted in October 1917.

The impetus for the planting of the Memorial Trees was provided by the Eumundi Women's Patriotic Committee. Funds were raised by public subscription, the total cost being approximately £100.

Up until the early twentieth century, there were few statues or monuments in Queensland. However, as a result of the First World War (1914–1918), memorials were erected in almost every Queensland town. Such public expression of both grief for the dead and pride in the nation has not been generated by previous or subsequent wars.

The First World War had an immense impact on the Australian population. Of those who went to war, almost one in five did not return. It was common for families to lose more than one son and for small communities to lose a whole generation of men.

In 1916 the British Government prohibited the exhumation and return of bodies. This, coupled with the impracticality of visiting distant graves ensured war memorials became an expression of public mourning, revered as cenotaphs (literally meaning 'empty tomb') by those who erected them. Placed at prominent locations, they became symbols of remembrance and were considered to be as sacred as grave sites. As such, materials, design principles and symbols suggesting permanence, reverence and commemoration were important elements.

Queenslanders were at the forefront of sustaining public expression. In 1916 they were the first state to establish ANZAC Day as a day of remembrance, encouraging other states to join them in making 25 April a day of national commemoration.

It was expected that this tradition would be continued by future generations and that the memorials themselves would be honoured and respected. However, it is apparent from the evidence of vandalism and alterations to memorials throughout the state that this has not always been the case.

The memorials are important, not only in terms of what they represent, but also for what they record. In addition to listing the local men who served and fell in the First World War, many memorials also display details regarding unveiling ceremonies and fund-raising committees, making them invaluable as social and historical documents. They are even more valuable when it is considered that all other documentary records of those who served in the First World War are listed either alphabetically or by military units, making it virtually impossible to determine the original locality of a specific serviceman. The memorials are therefore the only readily accessible records of the origins of the men who served and fell.

There are many different types of memorials throughout Queensland. However Memorial Drives of trees are relatively uncommon, particularly those in which each tree is representative of a specific fallen serviceman.

The original Eumundi Memorial Tree species were fig trees, of which twenty were planted. Of these, five are extant and the fifteen which didn't survive have been replaced with other species including camphor laurels, lilly pillies and jacarandas. The first trees were planted between the railway gates and the CWA Hall and the first two were replanted when the road was widened.

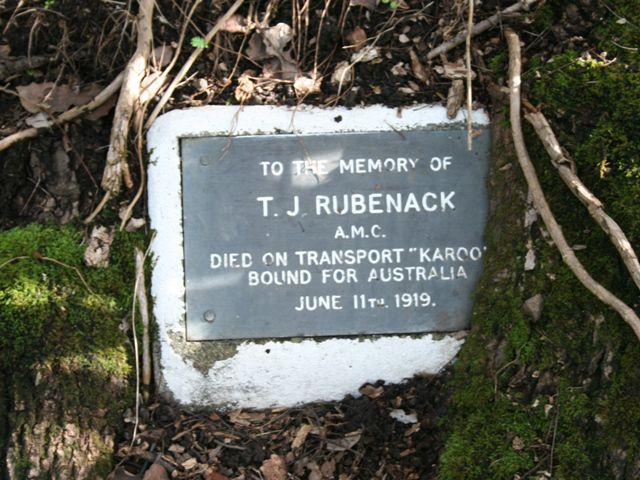
Plaque for T. J. Rubenack, 2009

When first planted, each tree was enclosed by a neat 6-by-6-foot (1.8 m × 1.8 m) paling fence painted white. Each fence bore a "10" x 8" bronze tablet bearing in brass letters the name, unit, date and place of death of each deceased soldier," By the 1970s, many of the trees had been replaced and the plaques had either been lost or had deteriorated. The twelve remaining plaques were replaced in 1976 by the Maroochy Shire Council and the original plaques placed in the Eumundi Historical Museum.

Soldiers from the Eumundi district commemorated by the Memorial Trees include:

- Walter (Ted) Gridley (died; July 28, 1918, France) was the great-grandson of Joseph Gridley, the first settler to take up land in the Eumundi district.
- Herbert William Cooke (killed in action; Gallipoli, 30 June 1915).
- Jabez Abraham (died; 21 August 1916) and Cyril Abraham (died; 20 October 1918). These men were the son and stepsons of G H Cooke who came to Eumundi in 1911 to take up the position of local schoolmaster.
- Aubrey Stuart-Russell (died of wounds; 4 July 1918, France) who came to the district in 1910 with his family and was the grandson of explorer Henry Stuart-Russell.
- Frank Morgan (died; 9 October 1917) and was a timber cutter in the district prior to the war. His brother Bert also served, but survived and returned to the Eumundi district.

The road on which the trees are located was originally the principal thoroughfare north. Shops, hotels and sawmills were located along it, and it ran parallel to the North Coast railway line.

Eumundi is one of the few towns in Queensland which does not display a monumental type memorial to the First World War. However, the placement of the trees on the main thoroughfare through town adheres to the formula of placing memorials in dominant and central positions. Although traffic north has been diverted, the Memorial Trees still provide a focal point, both for local residents and visitors.

The trees continue to be significant to the local community. This is indicated by the community based suggestion to change the name of the street from Main Street to Memorial Drive in 1977. They are a local landmark and provide the focal point for the well-known Eumundi Markets which were formed in 1979 and have become the primary industry of the town. The Markets are community based, with all proceeds going towards community organisations and local charities. The trees also continue to be the focal point for remembrance ceremonies, particularly on ANZAC Day, when they provide an educational opportunity for the local school children who make floral tributes to place at the foot of each tree.

The trees and plaques are cared for by the Maroochy Council arborist and the Eumundi Historical Association.

== Description ==
The Memorial Trees are situated over two streets in Eumundi. The most substantial planting is in Memorial Drive and comprises three figs (Ficus obliqua), three camphor laurels (Cinnamomum camphora), three lilly pillies (Syzygium paniculatum) and one jacaranda (Jacaranda mimosifolia) planted in the roadway on the northern side, and two camphor laurels on the southern side outside the Eumundi School of Arts. Three camphor laurels, two figs, two flame trees (Brachychiton acerifolius) and one lilly pilly line the western side of Gridley Street, within the boundary of Clem Park. Most of the trees are mature, and form a large and dominant canopy over the areas in which they are planted.

Memorial Drive is the main thoroughfare through the town, with Gridley Street running at right angles to it.

== Heritage listing ==
Eumundi War Memorial was listed on the Queensland Heritage Register on 5 December 1997 having satisfied the following criteria.

The place is important in demonstrating the evolution or pattern of Queensland's history.

War Memorials are important in demonstrating the pattern of Queensland's history as they are representative of a recurrent theme that involved most communities throughout the state. They provide evidence of an era of widespread Australian patriotism and nationalism, particularly during and following the First World War

The place demonstrates rare, uncommon or endangered aspects of Queensland's cultural heritage.

Avenues of trees as memorials, and particularly those where each tree is attributed to a particular fallen serviceman are uncommon in Queensland. Most memorials erected during or after the First World War were of the monumental type.

The place is important in demonstrating the principal characteristics of a particular class of cultural places.

They manifest a unique documentary record and are demonstrative of popular taste in the inter-war period.

The memorial at Eumundi demonstrates the principal characteristics of a commemorative form erected as an enduring record of a major historical event. This is achieved through the appropriate use of symbolic elements such as avenues of trees and plaques.

The place is important because of its aesthetic significance.

The Memorial Trees and their setting are a landmark within Eumundi and contribute to the aesthetic qualities of the townscape.

The place has a strong or special association with a particular community or cultural group for social, cultural or spiritual reasons.

They continue to be a focal point for the community, providing the venue for markets which have become an important asset to the town.

The Memorial Trees have a strong and continuing association with the community as evidence of the impact of a major historic event and as the focal point for the remembrance of that event. It also has special association with the families of the fallen, some of whom still reside in the district.
