= K'gari (Fraser Island) Great Walk =

Walking track on Fraser Island, Queensland, Australia

Fraser Island
Native name: K'gari, Gari

Geography
- Location: Australia
- Coordinates: 25°13′S 153°08′E
- Area: 1,840 km^{2} (710 sq mi)

Administration
- Australia
- State: Queensland
- LGA: Fraser Coast Region

The K'gari (Fraser Island) Great Walk is a long-distance walking track on K'gari, Queensland, Australia. Hikers should be fully self-sufficient and to carry sufficient water. The walk is rated easy to moderate on a difficulty scale being mostly at sea level and is traversed in one direction.

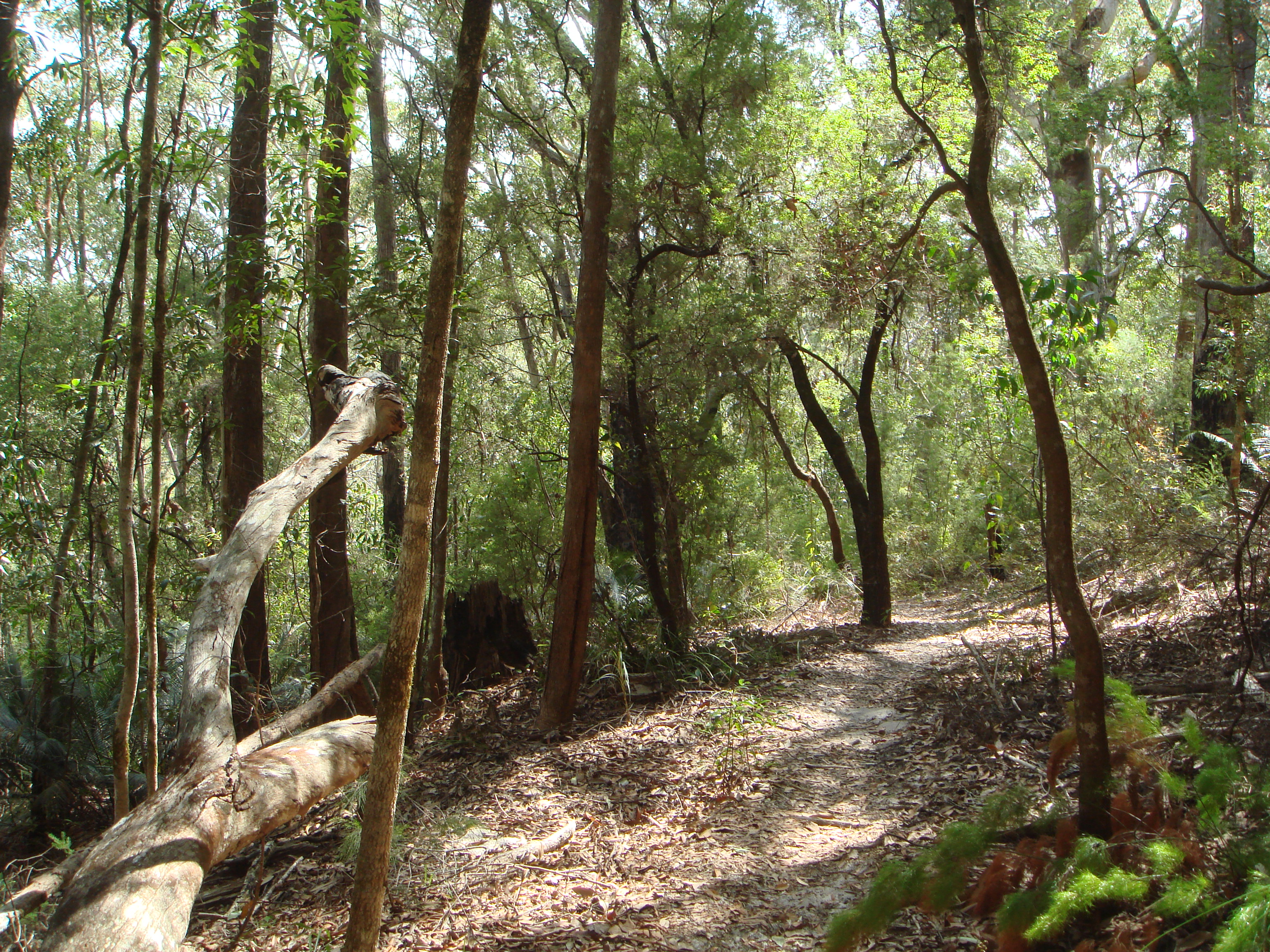
The track

It leads from Dilli Village, an environmental education camp of the University of the Sunshine Coast, to Happy Valley. The entire 90 km walk, which includes numerous smaller walks branching off the main trail, can be completed in 6 to 8 days. The Queensland Parks and Wildlife Service (QPWS) provides 8 walkers' camps for which a booking is essential.

The landscape during the walk changes between coastal heathland, mangrove forest, woodland and subtropical rainforest. The crystal-clear lakes and sand dunes are the highlights of this track. Due to the rain season, it is better not to do this hike from January to March.

A 40-kilometre (25-mile) extension to the walk from Lake Garawongera to Arch Cliffs, was developed by volunteers in 2010 and increased the length of the main trail to 90 kilometres (56 miles).

== See also ==
- List of long-distance hiking tracks in Australia
