= Cookamidgera =

- Town
- Coordinates: 33°12′09″S 148°18′03″E
- Country: Australia
- State: New South Wales
- LGA: Parkes Shire
- Established: 1893

Government
  - State electorate: Orange
  - Federal division: Parkes
- Elevation: 320 m (1,050 ft)

Population
  - Total: 164 (2016 census)
- Postcode: 2870
- Mean max temp: 23.4 °C (74.1 °F)
- Mean min temp: 10.9 °C (51.6 °F)
- Annual rainfall: 587.5 mm (23.13 in)

Cookamidgera is a town, Parish of Ashburnham County and Cadastral suburb of Forbes shire and Parkes Shire in the state of New South Wales, Australia.

Originally known as Bindegandri, the town was renamed Cookamidgera on 29 August 1895.

Cookamidgera is a stop on the Broken Hill railway line which was opened in 1893. The passenger services stopped in the 1970s, and passengers alight at the nearby Parkes railway station.

Most retail and commercial activity has also left the town, with such services being obtained in the adjoining town of Parkes. The remaining services in the town are Rural Fire Service brigade, one church, Mechanics Institute and the rail platform.
