= Tasmanian trail =

Long distance hiking trail in Tasmania

The Tasmanian Trail is a long distance path in Tasmania, Australia. It was inspired by the Bicentennial National Trail opened on the mainland in 1988.

It runs from Devonport in the north of the state to Dover in the South East and is 460 km long. It consists of 15 sections. Each section is approximately one day's journey for a horse rider or cyclist. The trail can be hiked, but its use of roads and other vehicle tracks means it is not always appealing to walkers. Many sections end at a town or a dedicated campsite. Campsite quality varies, but the trail co-ordinators aim to create three-sided huts, a water tank, a pit toilet, picnic tables and cleared tent sites at each.

The track runs mainly through state forest and other reserves. The trail often leaves valleys to seek ridge lines which then offer many scenic outlooks. The trail commences with a gentle grade on a made road from Devonport which runs beside the Mersey river. It soon enters rougher terrain including the Cluan Tiers, Great Western Tiers and then climbs into the Central Highlands. The trail then passes through Great Lakes region across the highlands to the River Derwent. At New Norfolk the trail leaves the Derwent and climbs over the mountain pass of the old stock route to the Huon River valley using a track around the ‘back’ of Hobart’s Mount Wellington.

The towns the track passes through (or near) are Latrobe, Railton, Sheffield, (Deloraine), Bracknell, Arthurs Lake, Miena, Bronte Park, Ouse, Bushy Park, Glenora, New Norfolk, Lachlan, Judbury, (Geeveston) and Dover.

Highlights of the track include:

- Cluan Tiers
- Great Western Tiers
- Arthurs Lake
- Bronte Park
- River Derwent
- Huon River
- Button Grass Plains

The Tasmanian Trail is managed by volunteers and the Tasmanian State Government Forestry Department.
