= Numinbah Valley School of Arts =

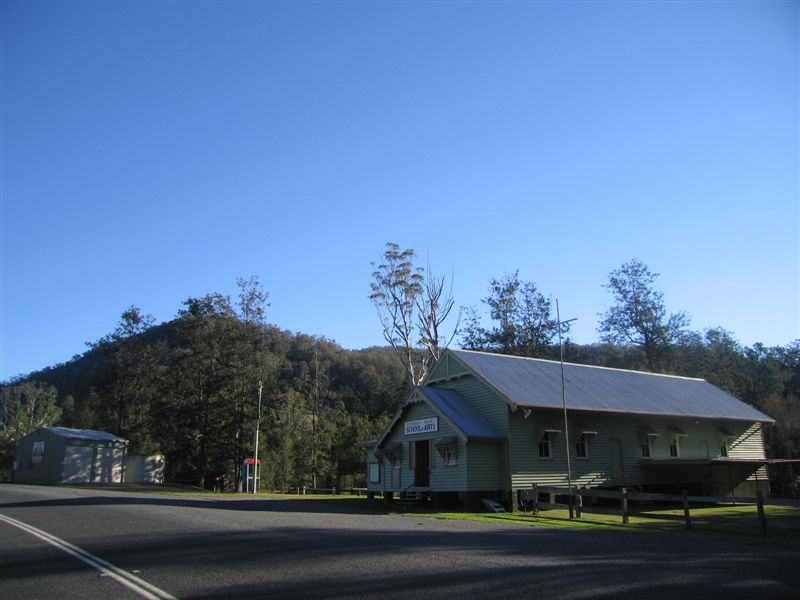
- Numinbah Valley School of Arts, 2007

- Location within Queensland Location within Australia
- 28.1381°S 153.2236°E
- Location: Nerang–Murwillumbah Road, Numinbah Valley, City of Gold Coast, Queensland, Australia

Queensland Heritage Register
- Official name: Numinbah Valley School of Arts
- Type: state heritage (built)
- Designated: 7 December 2007
- Reference no.: 602419
- Significant period: 1925–

Numinbah Valley School of Arts is a heritage-listed school of arts at Nerang–Murwillumbah Road, Numinbah Valley, City of Gold Coast, Queensland, Australia. It was added to the Queensland Heritage Register on 7 December 2007.

== History ==
The Numinbah Valley School of Arts was built in 1925 and is a single story timber building raised on stumps and capped with a corrugated galvanised iron roof. Extensions were carried out in 1937, 1960 and 1981. On entering the Numinbah Valley hamlet it is the first structure on the right side of the Nerang–Murwillumbah Road.

The Numinbah Valley strikes north from the McPherson Range and is enclosed to the southeast and the southwest by the plateaux of Springbrook and Beechmont. The Nerang-Murwillumbah road runs along the valley floor adjacent to the banks of the Nerang River. The cliffs, narrow ridges, forested slopes and open farmlands combine to create one of the most scenic rural areas in the Gold Coast Hinterland.

Settlement of the area is associated with timber getters moving up from the Tweed and Richmond Rivers in search of the valuable red cedar trees in the 1870s. The Queensland Government opened up the timber reserves in the Numinbah district for selection, subsequently a wave of settlers moved into this area. The timber resources of the area supported the economy of the local farming facilities and supplied timber for a number of local and regional saw mills. Dairies, banana plantations, beef and pig production, played a significant role in the subsequent economic development of the area. The valley was isolated from the sea and it was not until the early 1900s that it was linked to Nerang by a mountainous track of 18 miles (29 km). As the population in the valley increased and farming prospered the community called for better roads, mainly due to the dairy farmers needing to transport their goods to Nerang for railing to the Kingston Butter Factory within a short space of time. It was deemed the responsibility of the Numinbah residents to maintain this road – it was often damaged by large timber wagons.

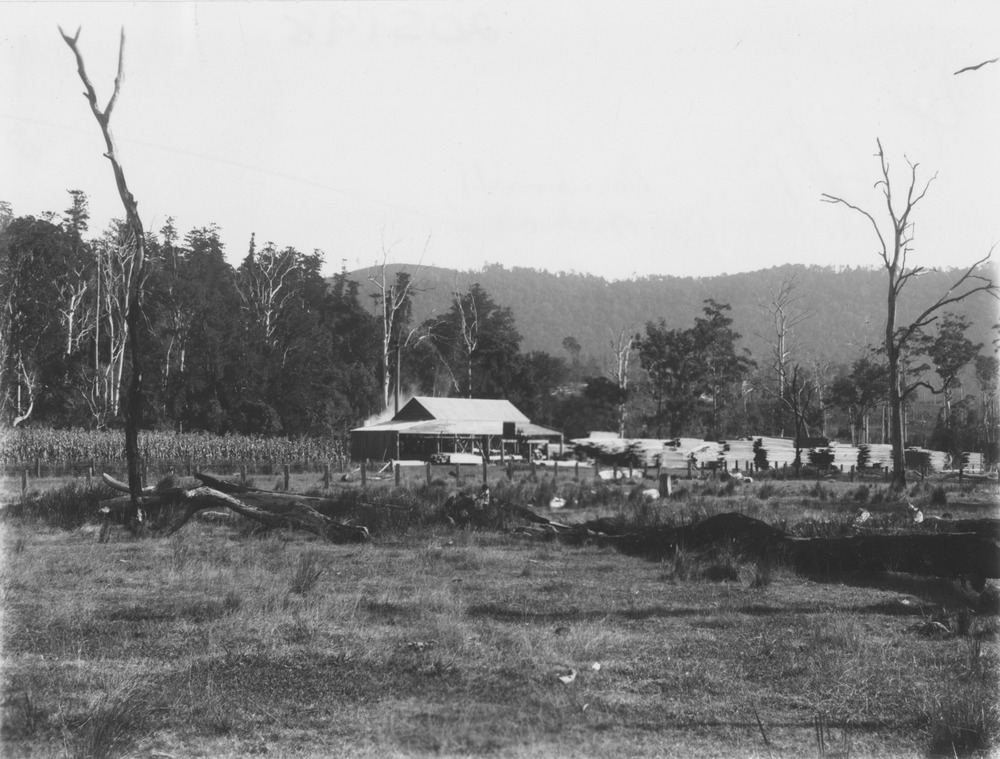
Yaun's sawmill at Numinbah Valley, circa 1912

In 1909 the Yaun family started moving their sawmill operation to Upper Nerang (the early name for the Numinbah settlement). Initially this pioneering family owned the Pine Mountain Sawmill at Nerang from 1896. The Numinbah sawmill continued to operate and employ local labour until destroyed by fire in 1944.

In 1915 Lillian Mary Yaun wrote to the Lands Department about acquiring reserve land for a community hall. After negotiations, the local community agreed to pay for a survey of land adjoining a road and a timber reserve for the School of Arts reserve. On 8 September 1916, 2 roods 3 perches (2,100 m^{2}) of thickly timbered land with dense undergrowth, was gazetted a reserve for a School of Arts. For many years the main venue for social and recreational events had been a farmer's barn or paddock. In 1923 Yaun again wrote to the Lands Department asking if the land could be used for a public hall as a social venue was required.

It was the need for a social, recreational and educational facility that galvanised the community in 1925 to raise funds by subscriptions and fund raising events so that they could build a hall. Members of the community donated timber to be processed in the Yaun Bros. sawmill (situated only a few hundred meters from the proposed School of Arts site); all work at the mill was carried out gratis. Cyril Duncan built the Numinbah Valley School of Arts hall for approximately £100 and this included the roofing iron and nails.

The first "Mechanics' Institutes" or "Schools of Arts" were established in Britain in the early 1800s and were intended to assist self-improvement and to promote moral, social and intellectual growth, by providing lectures, discussions and lending libraries to a rising middle class. At the time there were no public libraries and books were expensive, so that access to books by borrowing as subscribers provided an important educational and recreational service. The first institute in Australia was formed in Hobart in 1827, followed by Sydney in 1833, from which date the movement rapidly spread throughout the rest of the colony.

The first School of Arts committee in Queensland was established in Brisbane in 1849 with the aim of "the advancement of the community in literary, philosophic and scientific subjects". As towns and districts became established, local committees were formed to establish Schools of Arts and they became one of the principal sources of adult education. From this beginning, approximately 350 Schools of Arts were established throughout the state during the nineteenth and twentieth centuries.

A typical School of Arts building was of timber construction including a hall and two or three rooms used for library and meeting purposes. Larger provincial centres buildings were of masonry construction. Although varied in scale, form and materials they were readily identifiable in the streetscape and often incorporated impressive facades which spoke of the cultural ambitions of those who built them.

Tenders were called to erect the Numinbah Valley School of Arts in December 1925. The Numinbah Valley School of Arts opened in September 1926, free of debt. The new single-story, weatherboard clad School of Arts was 50 by 25 feet (15.2 by 7.6 m), capped with corrugated iron gable roof over the core and a lower gable over the entrance porch. At the rear there was a ten-foot stage with a room either side. The flooring, which was donated crow's ash flooring, was dressed by local labour and excellent for dancing. Seating was around the walls, which were 12 feet (3.7 m) high. The roof was well braced and the hall included a side entrance.

The first letter requesting a school for Numinbah Valley was dated 10 July 1926, and the parents asked if the Numinbah Valley School of Arts could be used as a Provisional school. From the late nineteenth to the early twentieth centuries the Queensland Government began to focus on the importance of education for children between the ages of six and twelve. The education system was poorly funded in this period. As a consequence many smaller communities, such as Numinbah Valley, were responsible for the establishment and funding of their own schools. The following year on 7 February the Provisional Numinbah School opened in the School of Arts building. There were 16 pupils; 13 boys and 3 girls. The Queensland Government recognised this school as a Provisional School. Limited Government assistance was given, such as salary assistance for a teacher and the supply of state approved books. The community had to provide the school building as well as accommodation for the teacher. The school continued to use this building until a purpose built State School opened in its own Education Department building on 8 October 1934.

By 1937 roads had improved and banana plantations had been established. With increased development it was deemed necessary to enlarge the School of Arts. This included a 25-foot (7.6 m) extension added to the rear to provide a much larger area for dancing and seating for concerts and other purposes. Also the front entrance was altered to provide male and female changing/ cloak rooms on either side of the entrance.

During the early 1960s the hall was further enlarged with the construction of a side veranda on the southern elevation, to allow for more seating and a supper area. The community, especially the local QCWA (Queensland Country Women's Association), helped raise the necessary funds. With the introduction of electricity to the valley in 1961 kerosene lanterns were replaced with fluorescent and other lights and power points were fitted. The kitchen was installed in 1962. Also in the 1960s the front entrance was again modified with the left-hand side room converted to a ticket office with a mother's room on the other side.

In September, 1975, locals and others celebrated the School of Art's 50th Birthday. An article "Hub of Valley has a birthday Party" in the Courier Mail of 21 September 1975, mentioned the gable of green painted hall as having very elegant fretwork infill. Also the article commented that the hall was used for wedding receptions, gift evenings, dances and socials, and church services.

A corrugated iron roofed open annexe was added along the end of the northern wall in 1981, and has been extended since. During 1983 prison labour from the Numinbah Valley State Farm was used to build a bar in the supper room, and the following year they repainted the hall. One prisoner painted Australian theme murals on three walls of the bar area.

A post and two-rail fence encloses much of a large semi open space on the northern side of the hall. This area stretches from the Nerang River to the main road and has been used for school and local sports days, picnic area and other recreational activities.

The Numinbah Valley School of Arts is a community-built building that has been used for recreational, social and educational purposes since it was built.

== Description ==
Numinbah School of Arts is an elevated, single-storey timber building with a corrugated galvanised iron, double gabled roof. It faces the main road that links Nerang to Murwillumbah.

The core of the building is rectangular in plan with a small entrance veranda under the second and lower gable. An enclosed veranda with a hipped roof is attached on the left or southern elevation and there is an open-air annexe on the northern side. The main entrance to the building is via the entrance porch.

There are two sets of steps to the supper room on the southern elevation separated by pairs of sash windows which do not have sunhoods.

Both gables have a flying gable with bargeboards featuring fretwork decoration. The superior gable has a lattice infill on either side of the central open entrance which is flanked by windows with skillion sunhoods. Above the entrance is a large board proclaiming that the hall is the Numinbah Valley School of Arts. The lined entrance porch contains a ticket office on the left and another room on the right. There is a notice board inside this foyer and one outside under a window and another outside the supper room. There is a doorway to this supper room but no steps.

There are two doors into the hall on the northern elevation, but only the door near the front has steps. This side also features two pairs of sash windows with skillion sunhoods on either side of the door. From near this entrance to the rear of the building is an open-air annex. The sub-floor at the end of the building has been closed in. A large plastic tank and another concrete one at the back is used as the hall's water source.

On the southern elevation, a post and two-rail timber fence stretches from the rear of the hall to the brick and concrete public toilets and then across to the boundary of the adjoining property. On the northern side of the hall the fence separates the open rural park-like area from the road. Near the hall is a fairly level open stretch of ground with some simple plank seating near the river. Beyond this flattish area is undulating lightly timbered land. Near the road is a billabong.

The toilet block is not significant.

== Heritage listing ==
Numinbah Valley School of Arts was listed on the Queensland Heritage Register on 7 December 2007 having satisfied the following criteria.

The place is important in demonstrating the evolution or pattern of Queensland's history.

The Numinbah Valley School of Arts, built in 1925, is one of many School of Arts constructed throughout Queensland. By the 1900s, almost every town in Queensland had a School of Arts and they were often seen as indicators of the prosperity or status of the town. As such, they demonstrate the evolution of Queensland's history.

The building is representative of an intact, community built School of Arts. It has strong associations with the Numinbah Valley and surrounding area as a recreational and social facility since 1925. It has been used as the venue for diverse activities ranging from state education, dancing classes, church services, cinema, exercise classes, table tennis, school sports and P and C fund raisers. It has also been home for many organisations and clubs including the local QCWA (Queensland Country Women's Association) and the Volunteer Bush Fire Brigade. The Numinbah Valley School of Arts is important for its connection with the valleys' community and as an integral part of the social and community life of the locality.

The place is important in demonstrating the principal characteristics of a particular class of cultural places.

The Numinbah Valley School of Arts is representative of a community hall built for the school of arts movement in Queensland. Its fabric is largely intact.

The place is important because of its aesthetic significance.

It has aesthetic significance due to the simplicity of the design, symmetry of the front entrance with fretwork bargeboards, as well as the adjacent rural park-like area. As well proportioned and detailed timber buildings built in a traditional style, the Numinbah Valley School of Arts makes a substantial contribution to the built character of Numinbah Valley. The building is significant as part of the rural landscape that has a scattered population. The building has a landmark position with the small community as it is a large structure and is positioned on the main road through Numinbah Valley.
