= Arts Theatre Cronulla =

Community theatre in Sydney, Australia

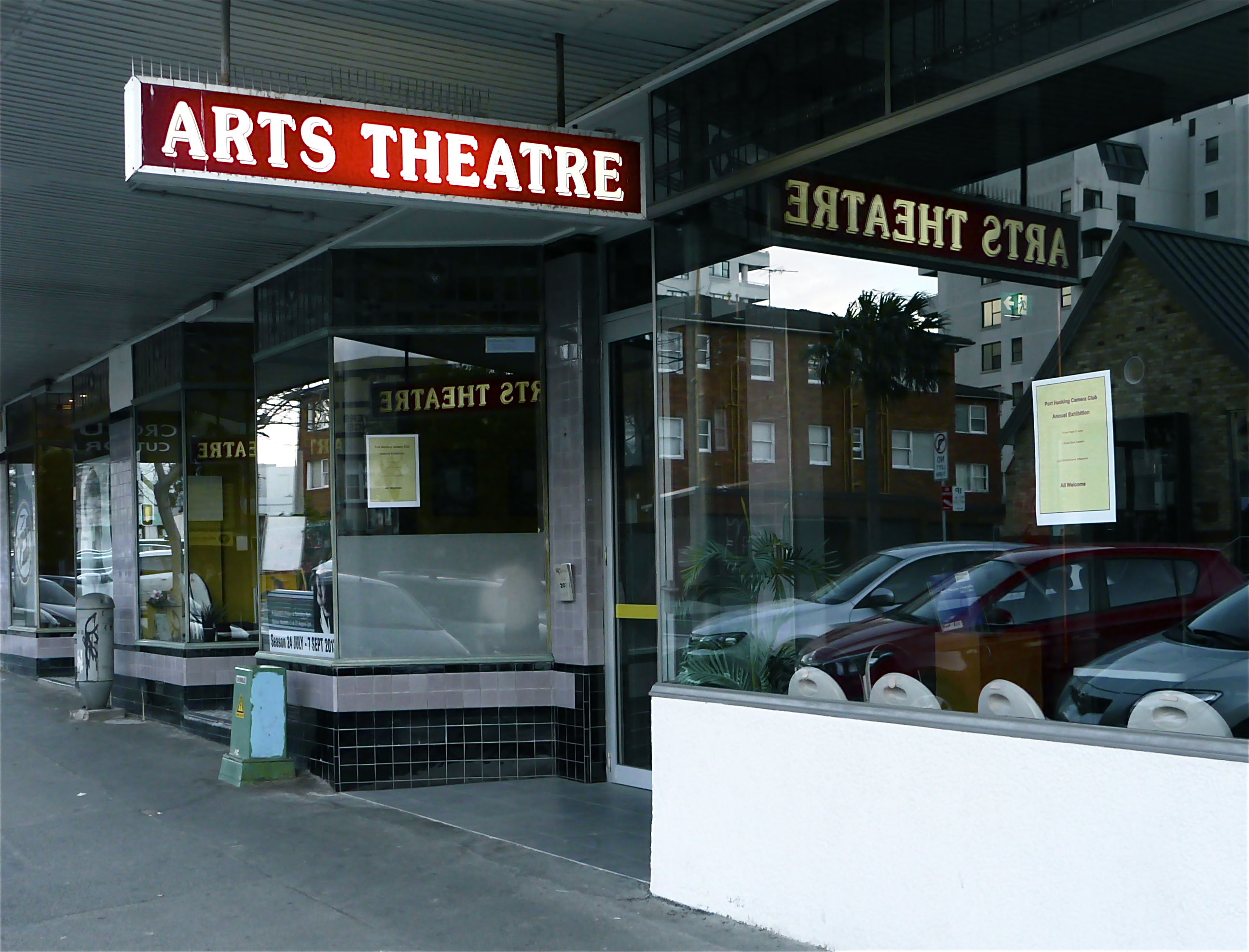
Street view of the Cronulla Arts Theatre, Cronulla, New South Wales, Australia.

The Arts Theatre Cronulla is a community theatre located at 6 Surf Road Cronulla in Sydney, New South Wales, Australia. It has a single auditorium that seats 120.

== Early years ==
Cronulla School of Arts Dramatic Society (1946–1957). In 1946 Beryl Austin, a member of the Cronulla School of the Arts, organised a dramatic club, which became known as the Cronulla School of Arts Dramatic Society. Without a permanent venue they performed in a variety of Sutherland Shire venues: the Masonic Hall, Thornton Hall, the Church of England Parish Hall, and the Miranda School of the Arts. Their first production was The Haxtons, by Hugh Walpole, directed by Beryl Austin on 30 April 1947. Over 11 years the society presented 20 plays the last being ROPE, by Patrick Hamilton, directed by Ken Imison.

The Cronulla School of Arts Theatre Group (1958–1962). In 1958 the society changed their name to The Cronulla School of Arts Theatre Group when they moved into a permanent venue in the auditorium of the School of Arts Building in Surf Road Cronulla. As the building was not yet licensed for public performances, the audience was restricted to the Theatre Group members only. Their first production, The Happiest Days of Your Life, by John Dighton, directed by Dick Moss, was performed on 22 March 1958. The group performed thirteen plays over the four-year period with their last production being Rhinoceros, by Eugène Ionesco, directed by Pam Comey and John Scott.

== 1963 to Present ==
The Arts Theatre Cronulla (1963–2013). After making the necessary improvements for the building to be licensed for public performances the theatre, under its new name Arts Theatre Cronulla, opened for its first production on 30 November 1963 with a production of Will Any Gentleman...?, by Vernon Sylvaine, directed by Ron Martin. Over the proceeding fifty years the theatre has staged close to 200 productions covering works ranging from the historical greats to the contemporary classics. In 2012 after nearly fifty years in the original 100-year-old building, the theatre underwent major renovations bringing its facilities in line with modern standards. Along with their regular season of plays the Cronulla Arts Theatre also runs adult drama classes and a Crash Test drama program for the development of short plays. Unlike the vast majority of the surviving Schools of Arts, which are owned and managed by local councils, Cronulla School of Arts is still privately owned. 13 November 2013 marks the theatre's 50th anniversary. Throughout this period many people have been involved in the theatre and its productions, some of the more notable are: Ron Martin, Dick Moss, Joyce Jacobs, Lorraine Crane, Don Browne, Monte Buchanan, James Bruce, Doreen and Syd Grant, Kathy Goddard and Joy Baker.
