= Horsnell Gully Conservation Park =

Protected area in South Australia

- IUCN category III (natural monument or feature)
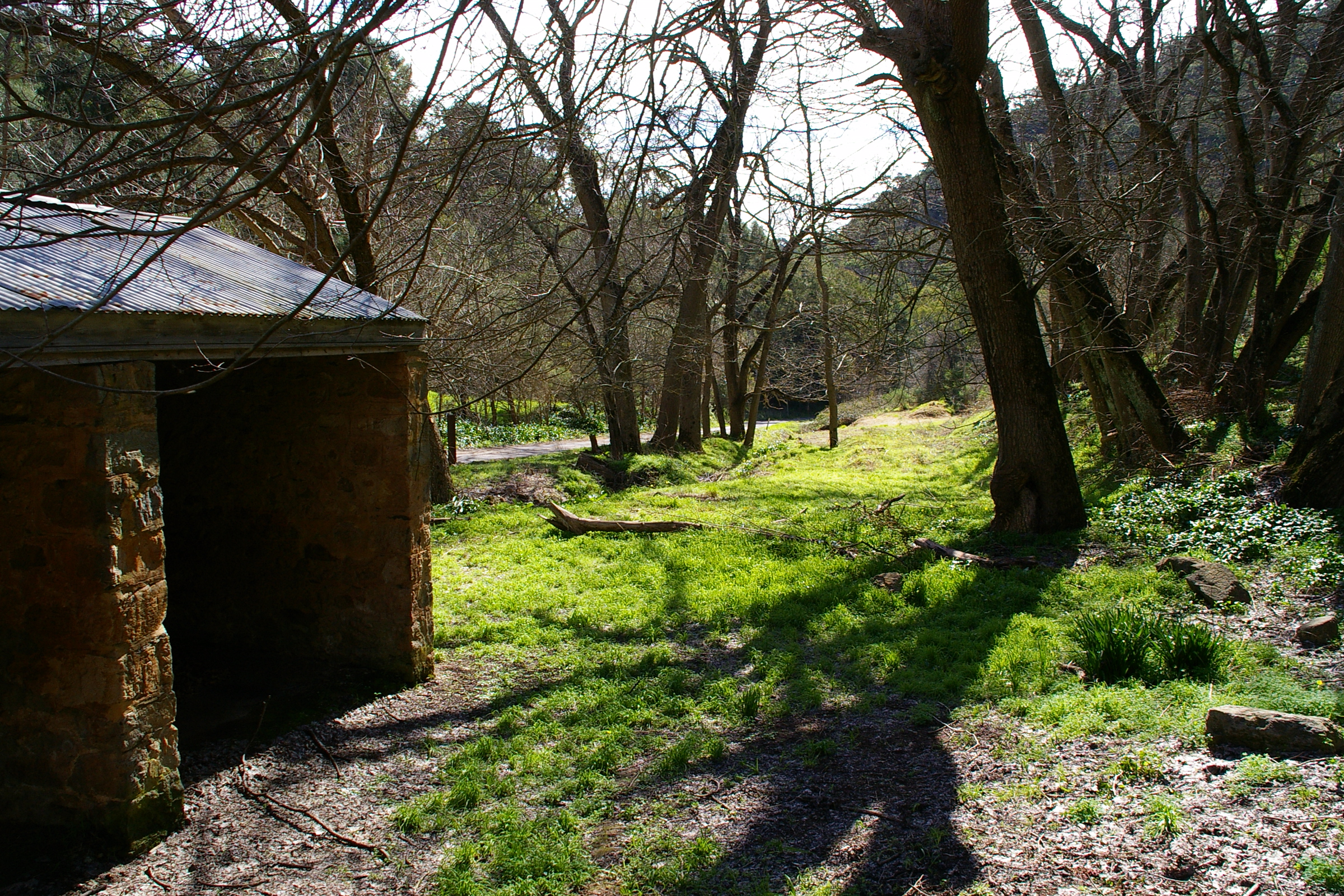
- Building at the lower entrance

- Location within South Australia
- Location: South Australia
- Nearest city: Norton Summit
- Coordinates: 34°55′59″S 138°42′18″E
- Area: 1.37 km^{2} (0.53 sq mi)
- Established: 1 January 1947
- Governing body: Department for Environment and Water
- Website: Official website

Horsnell Gully Conservation Park (formerly Horsnell Gully National Park) is a protected area in the Australian state of South Australia in the locality of Horsnell Gully located about 9 kilometres (5.6 mi) east of the state capital of Adelaide and about 2.3 kilometres (1.4 mi) southwest of Norton Summit.

It contains several small gorges feeding the Adelaide Plains, a small seasonal waterfall and a number of walking trails including one that is part of the Heysen Trail. It adjoins the Giles Conservation Park which was formerly the conservation park's upper eastern section.

The conservation park consists of land in sections 609 and 618 in the cadastral unit of the Hundred of Adelaide.

Land within the conservation park having an area of 1.14 square kilometres (282 acres) first gained protected status as a national pleasure resort during 1947 and prior to 6 August 1947. On 7 March 1963, section 609 was dedicated as part of a wildlife reserve proclaimed under the Crown Lands Act 1929. On 9 November 1967, all of the land was proclaimed under the National Parks Act 1966 as the Horsnell National Park. The national park was re-proclaimed under the National Parks and Wildlife Act 1972 as Horsnell Conservation Park on 27 April 1972. On 28 November 1985, land in sections 1118 and 1119 of the Hundred of Adelaide was added to the conservation park. On 30 August 2007, the land added in 1985 was separately constituted as the Giles Conservation Park. As of 2018, it covered an area of 1.37 square kilometres (0.53 sq mi).

The entirety of the conservation park is now leased from the government on a monthly basis for industrial purposes by the neighbouring White Rock Quarry, owned by the German-based multinational company, Heidelberg Cement Group. 10 acres of conservation park land have been cleared and used for stockpiling and dumping of old machinery and vehicles. The water from Horsnell Conservation Park Dam is also used by the company for the manufacturing of concrete.

There is a community group, Residents Against White Rock Quarry, who are campaigning for the termination of this lease.

In 1980, the park was described as follows:

Covering the western slopes of the Mount Lofty ranges due east of Adelaide, Horsnell Gully Conservation Park encompasses an area of rugged terrain. It forms part of the watershed of Third Creek, one of the five main tributaries of the River Torrens. Plant communities are represented by stringybark associations with Sclerophyllous understories and the smoothbark (Eucalyptus camaldulensis, E viminalis and E leucoxylon) associations on more fertile soils at lower elevations. A Savannah understorey of alien pasture plants with some shrubs is a feature of this area.

It is classified as an IUCN Category III protected area. In 1980, the conservation park was listed on the former Register of the National Estate.

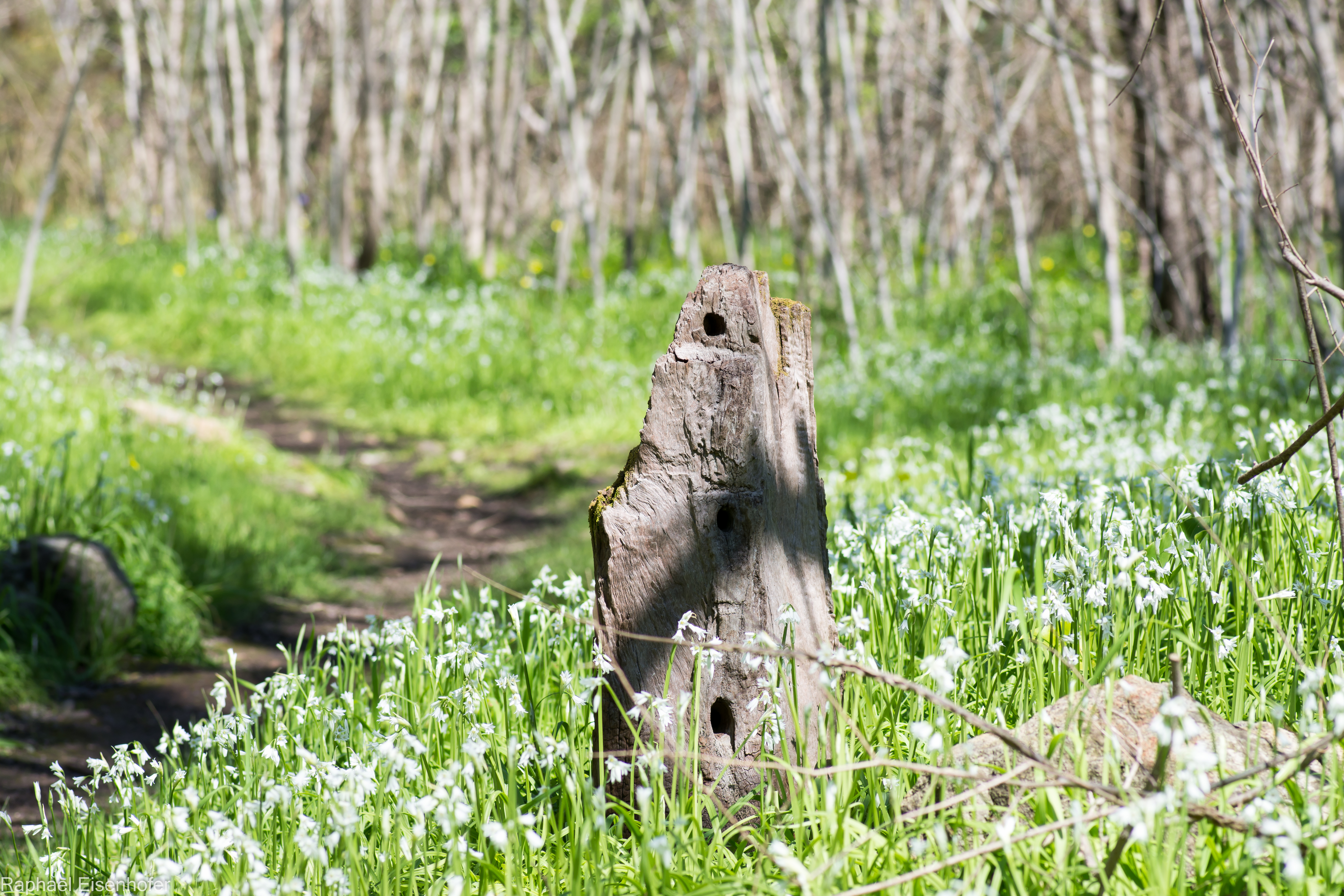
Flowering Allium on the Horsnell Gulley walk

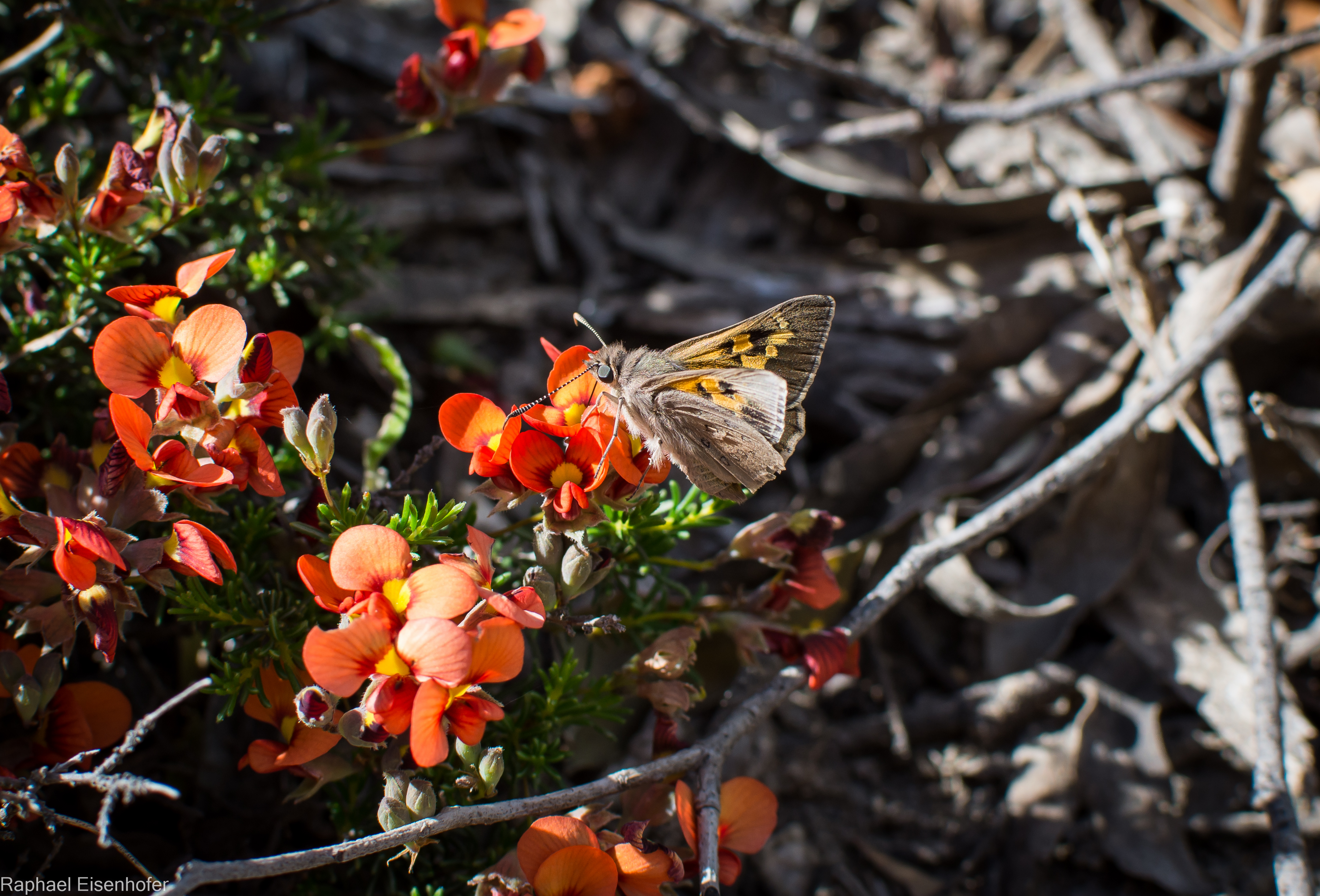
Unknown butterfly on the Horsnell Gulley walk

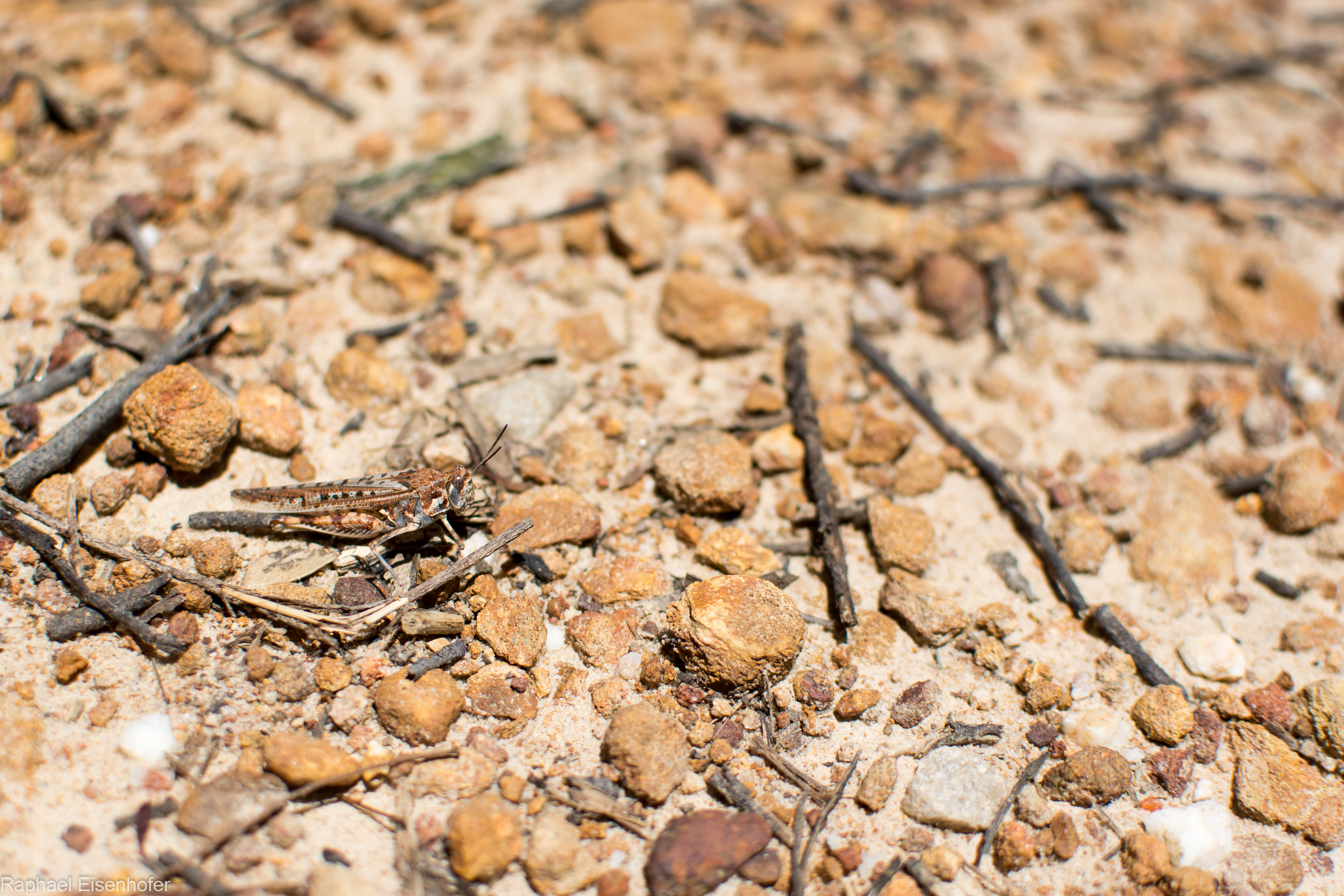
Unknown orthopteran on the Horsnell Gulley walk

== See also ==
- Protected areas of South Australia
