= Gold Coast Hinterland Great Walk =

Walking track in Queensland, Australia

The Gold Coast Hinterland Great Walk is a 54-kilometre (34 mi) walking track in the Gold Coast region of Queensland, Australia. The path takes the walker through the most extensive area of subtropical rainforest in the world.
