= Dunethin Rock =

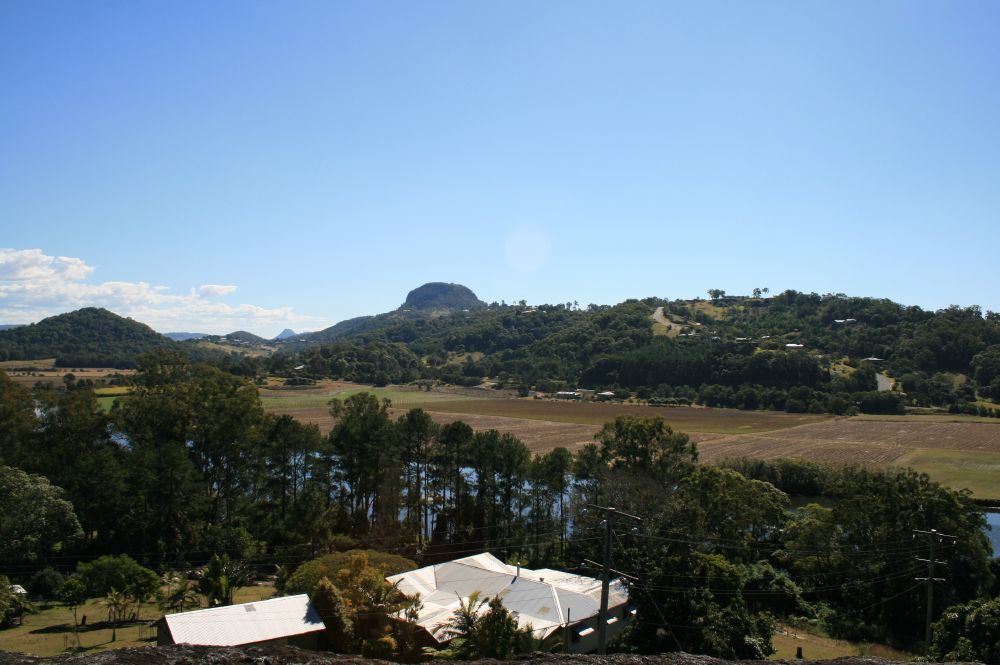
- Dunethin Rock in the landscape, 2007

- Location within Queensland Location within Australia
- 26.5771°S 153.0121°E
- Location: Dunethin Rock Road, Maroochy River, Sunshine Coast Region, Queensland, Australia

History
- Design period: 1900 - 1914 (early 20th century)

Queensland Heritage Register
- Official name: Dunethin Rock
- Type: state heritage (landscape)
- Designated: 5 February 2009
- Reference no.: 602695
- Significant period: 1900s-ongoing
- Significant components: natural landscape

Dunethin Rock is a heritage-listed park at Dunethin Rock Road, Maroochy River, Sunshine Coast Region, Queensland, Australia. It was added to the Queensland Heritage Register on 5 February 2009.

== History ==
Dunethin Rock, a scenic reserve on the southern bank of the upper Maroochy River, is an important site associated with the development of tourism from the early 1900s on the Sunshine Coast, a major tourist region in Queensland.

The two earliest pastoral leases on the northern bank of the Maroochy River were the Canando and Yandina runs leased by Daniel and Zachariah Skyring in 1853. Dunethin Rock, a prominent monolith on the southern bank of the river marked the shared southern boundaries of these runs. Land on the southern side of the Maroochy River was opened for grazing after 1860. In 1861 Edmund Lander leased the Mooloolah Back Plains, a run of 26,500 acres (10,700 ha) with an outstation near Lake Dunethin, an inlet of the Maroochy River just north of Dunethin Rock. This outstation was abandoned by 1868. In 1862 John Westaway took up land east of Lander, known as Moolooloo Back Plains. Similar to the Skyring stations, the boundaries of the southern runs terminated on the Maroochy River in the vicinity of Dunethin Rock.

During the 1860s the economy of the Maroochy region became increasingly geared towards extraction of the bountiful timber in the area. Brisbane timber merchant William Pettigrew, highly influential in the timber trade throughout south-east Queensland established a presence in the region, with depots on both the Maroochy and Mooloolah rivers later establishing a sawmilling complex near the Maroochy's mouth. In the mid-1860s Pettigrew transferred his Maroochy timber lease to James Low. Low established a timber depot opposite and slightly upstream from Dunethin Rock on the site of the wharf of the original Yandina run, opening a post office in 1868. The word Dunethin is of Aboriginal origin meaning the place of swimming trees, (dhu trees, yungathin, swim), a reference to the logs transported on the river in the area during this period. Until 1970, when Dunethin became the official name, the locality was often referred to as Dunethim.

An early overland track from the depot to the Gympie diggings was built by Low and other timbergetters, accessed by a journey up the Maroochy River. The depot was closed after a new Brisbane-Gympie road opened in late 1868. Low moved his operations close to where the new road crossed the Maroochy River, near present-day Yandina.

Following the 1868 Crown Lands Alienation Act, the earlier pastoral runs on the Maroochy River were divided for closer settlement for agriculture. In November 1873, James Campbell applied for selection of approximately 180 acres (73 ha) of second class pastoral land surrounding Dunethin Rock. Campbell's application was cancelled because the government had decided not to open up the land, surveyed as Portion 28 Parish of Maroochy, for selection. However, some sections of this land parcel were excised for selection from the mid-1870s until 1900.

In January 1901 a group of local residents petitioned the Lands Department to have the remainder of Portion 28 and vacant Crown land in Portion 55, which included both Dunethin Rock and the Lake, set aside as a reserve for public purposes. The petitioners contended the land was the only unselected parcel on the Maroochy River above flood level and should be set aside for retreat for residents and stock and for township and other purposes. Consequently, a Reserve for Public Purposes of 520 acres (210 ha) (R.236) was proclaimed.

After 1906, the reserve was incrementally reduced for a mixture of private selections and public purposes. An esplanade facing the river was retained to allow for access to the water. The Maroochy River State School was opened in June 1911, with a School Reserve gazetted in 1913. This school operated until 1972, servicing families settled along the river, with students arriving by a boat service to the Dunethin wharf sited between the rock and the lake. A School of Arts reserve was also gazetted in 1913. The Maroochy River School of Arts opened in 1914 and was a centre for social functions until its closure in 1963. The Maroochy River School and School of Arts were sited northwest of the rock, opposite the southern bank of the lake.

A Scenic Reserve of approximately 5 acres (2.0 ha) which encircled the rock itself was gazetted in 1923 and was placed under the control of the Maroochy Shire Council. The remainder of the original 1901 reserve was renamed a reserve for camping and scenic purposes in 1924, further reduced in 1935 with a recreation and sports ground reserve, extending along the river to the junction with Lake Dunethin. The scenic reserve and the recreation and sports reserve connected Dunethin Rock and the Lake via the river bank, the central locations for tourist, leisure and social activities.

The lower reaches of the Maroochy River began to develop as a place of resort in the 1880s. On the southern bank, a 215-acre (87 ha) wharf and water reserve was gazetted in 1873 near the river's mouth. Holiday makers camped on the reserve among the native cotton trees. From the 1890s the Salvation Army established an encampment over the Christmas period on the reserve, a popular annual event held until 1929. The use of this calm, shallow stretch of the river as a watering place for swimming, boating and fishing reflected the seaside preferences of the Victorian era. Similar locations for resort on the North Coast were developed in the same period at Caloundra and Tewantin.

Local visitors predominated until after World War I. Brisbane surveyor Thomas O'Connor acquired what had been Pettigrew's sawmill complex near the reserve in 1903, with the intent of developing a riverside resort. Part of this land was subdivided and sold at an auction in Nambour in 1908, signalling the beginning of more intensive development in the area. Further development and expansion of Maroochy's tourist industry was fostered with the subdivision and auction of most of the reserve into the Township of Maroochydore in 1915.

As with Maroochydore, the use of the Dunethin Rock locality as a place of leisure began with the local population. From the early 1900s it became a popular destination for picnics, fishing and enjoying the view from the rock summit. The Yandina-Maroochy Progress Association celebrated its first anniversary on the lake in 1905 and a held a "Grand Aquatic Sports" event on Easter Monday 1907. The Maroochy River School functioned as the community hall from 1911 until the School of Arts was built in 1914, providing a permanent structure for community occasions and fundraising events. During 1915 the Maroochy District Patriotic Sports meeting was held with land and water events that included wood chopping, sawing, running and motor boat races. A "Grand Excursion" to Dunethin Lake in aid of the Wounded Soldiers Fund was held in 1916. In the same year, a team of Brisbane swimmers visited Dunethin rock to launch the Maroochy River and District Swimming Club.

From the early 1900s the attractions of the seaside and mountain resorts of the North Coast, as the Sunshine Coast area was then known, began to receive wider exposure. Publications by Queensland Railways and the Queensland Intelligence and Tourist Bureau drew attention to the scenic features of the natural environment, such as rainforests, rivers and waterfalls. At the instigation of Thomas O'Connor and the Maroochy River Progress Association, a tour of the Maroochy region's beauty spots was conducted with representatives of the Intelligence and Tourist Bureau, the Lands Department, leading banks and metropolitan journalists in early 1910. The objective of the tour was to protect Maroochy's beauty spots "for all time". The itinerary included a climb to the summit of Dunethin Rock to highlight the extensive panoramic views of cane fields, farms, the river and the mountains between the coast and ranges. From the 1910s Dunethin Rock became much frequented as a place to take important dignitaries and representatives visiting the Maroochy Shire.

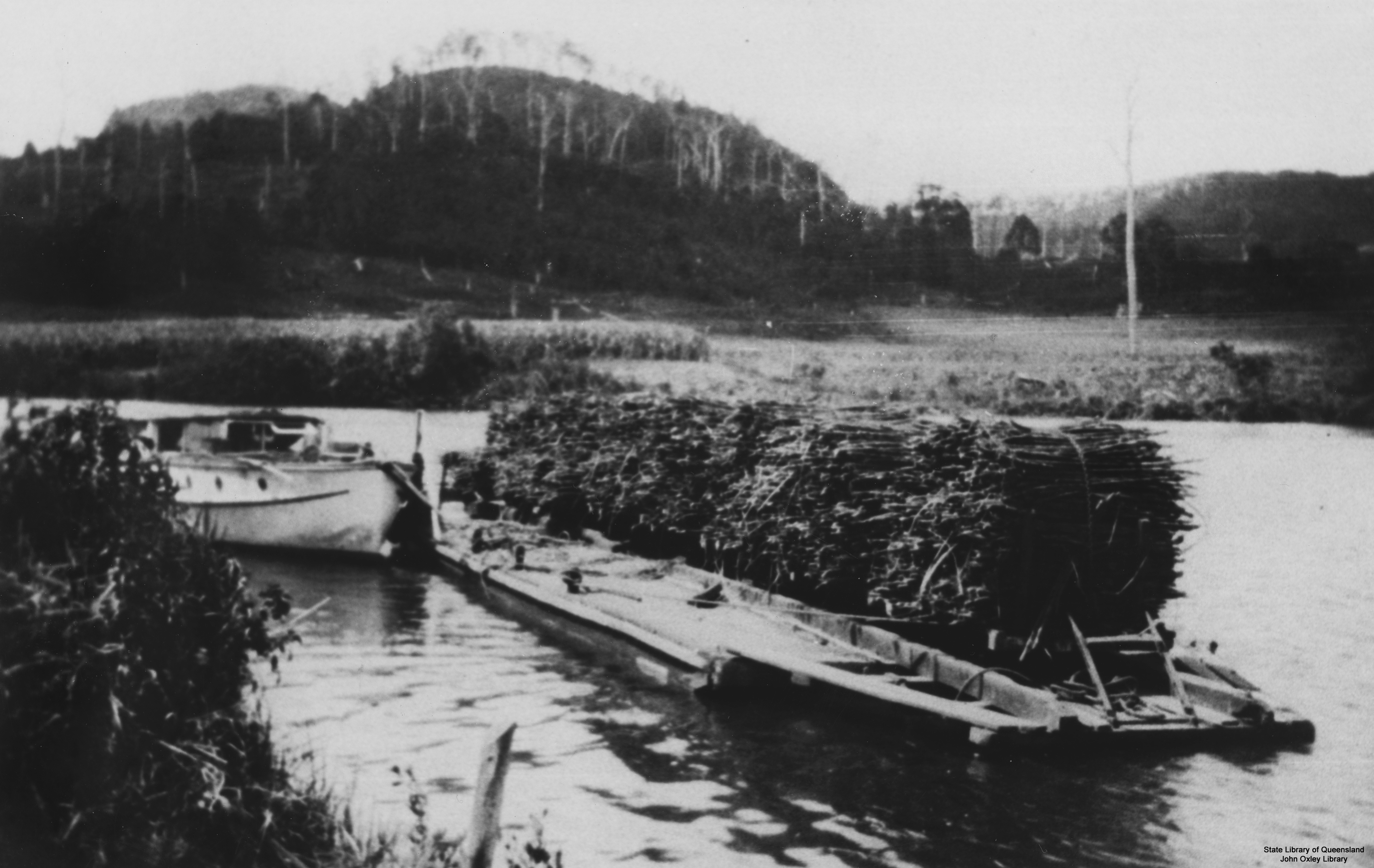
River barge transporting rakes of cut sugar cane at Dunethin Rock, 1920s

From 1909, the Moreton Central Sugar Milling Company was making use of cane trams to convey passengers from Nambour railway station to Cedar Tree on Petrie Creek, extending its service to Deepwater at Bli Bli in 1911. From these points, motor launches took passengers to the jetty at Cotton Tree. In 1923, a tram line to Dunethin Rock was completed to transport sugar cane from nearby farms. The Nambour Chronicle records the use of the line to transport tourists from Nambour in October of that year. It is undetermined how long this practice continued. The line was extended to Lake Dunethin in 1946; however all passenger transport on the tram network had ceased by 1936.

Until the late 1920s, when the Main Road between Nambour and Maroochydore was constructed, the Maroochy River was the key transport route for visitors to the growing tourist settlements of Maroochydore and Cotton Tree. The number of commuter boats increased after the Moreton Mill began its passenger carrying operations. Motor launches transporting passengers from the 1910s included Charles Thiedke's Vera I and Vera II, William Evans' M.V. Favourite and Thomas O'Connor's M.V. Alexandra and M.V. Hazeldean. William Coulson operated the mail service on the river between Yandina and Maroochydore during this period and was transporting passengers from Yandina railway station by 1916.

Outside of commuter services, many of the motor launches were also available for hire and charter along the Maroochy River. The wharf near Dunethin Rock was an obvious destination for these operators as it provided the most convenient access for excursionists to the locality and for social events at the School of Arts. In 1916 the boats Vera and Hazeldean ferried passengers to Dunethin Rock for the Wounded Soldiers Fund excursion. In 1923 a Nambour Chronicle correspondent drew attention to the potential of the upper reaches of the Maroochy River for touring purposes including the "outstanding natural feature" of Dunethin Rock.

Percy Evans, son of William Evans had purchased O'Connor's motor launch business in 1919. During the 1920s Evans began offering weekly cruises from Cotton Tree jetty to Dunethin Rock. The 1927 edition of ''From Noosa to the Tweed" recommended Dunethin Rock and Lake as "picturesque spots well worth visiting". Following the opening of the Nambour-Maroochydore road in 1927 demand for passenger transport declined and Moreton Mill suspended their Maroochydore service in 1929. Thereafter, boat owners increasingly concentrated their operations on recreational activities on the river.

During the 1930s and 1940s, Dunethin Rock continued to grow in popularity as a destination, with facilities for visitors gradually improving. After the opening of the first section of the Bruce Highway in December 1934, motor vehicle access to Dunethin Rock began to receive more attention. In 1937 the Royal Automobile Club of Queensland, who provided many of the earliest road signs in the state, responded to a request by the Maroochy River Progress Association to have a sign placed at the Dunethin Road turn off at Yandina. By this time the Association had begun lobbying the Main Roads Commission to connect the separate Yandina and-Bli Bli roads that provided access to the area. From 1938, the Association appealed to Maroochy Shire Council for a shelter shed to be constructed at the wharf, eventually completed in 1940 at a cost of £20. As part of Arbor Day celebrations in 1939, an avenue of trees was planted on the Dunethin reserve by the Maroochy River School Committee.

A 1940 meeting of the Association noted the increasing popularity of motor boat cruises to the reserve during the holiday season and advocated installing beacons to warn boats of submerged rocks near the jetty. In the same year the Maroochy Shire Council carried a motion to have a road cleared by voluntary labour to the top of the rock, as the improved road from Nambour-Bli-Bli had increased the potential to for the site to become "one of the most attractive tourist centres in the district". It is uncertain whether this work was proceeded with. The wharf originally built by local residents, was replaced by Council in June 1944. In December of that year over 300 people visited for the Moreton Mill Welfare Club picnic.

An estimated 700 people visited over January 1945. The Queensland Tourist Bureau and Railway Department's official photographer, Mr. S.G. Wardle visited Dunethin Rock and other scenic locations on the North Coast in February 1946 to take photos for inclusion in a new issue of tourist booklets published by the Bureau. After the 1945–1946 holiday season, councillors within Maroochy Shire Council pushed for construction of conveniences, in light of its continuing growth as a picnic resort and the large bus and boat contingents frequently visiting the reserve. Despite protests by Percy Evans, who was transporting the majority of tourists to Dunethin Rock, a landing fee of 10 shillings towards maintenance was imposed by Maroochy Shire Council. The conveniences were eventually built in 1948.

David Low, who was the Member of the Queensland Legislative Assembly for Cooroora in the late 1940s, recognised the potential for the growth in coastal tourism, advocating improved facilities and better promotion of the area. During 1948 Low, on behalf of the Maroochy River Progress Association made an unsuccessful representation to the Main Roads Commission to have the road between Dunethin and Bli Bli declared a tourist road. In 1949 Low attended the Arbor Day tree planting ceremony at Maroochy River School. Low stressed the importance of planting trees in the locality as he was of the opinion that Dunethin Rock would one day become one of the "chief tourist places on the North Coast" and was the "most beautiful spot he had seen".

In the early 1950s Dunethin Rock continued to be popular for tourists arriving by motor launch. However, as petrol rationing ceased and car ownership increased more visitors began arriving by road. In 1952 Low was elected Chairman of Maroochy Shire Council resulting in increased expenditure on tourist infrastructure and transport linkages serving the coastal area as well as inland rural districts in the shire. During the 1953–54 financial year Maroochy Shire Council allocated £500 for tourist development at Dunethin Rock and at Wappa Falls, further upstream. However this money was not spent and was reallocated in the 1954–55 budget. In August 1955, Council began work on constructing the long advocated link that connected the Yandina and Bli Bli roads to Dunethin Rock. This road was completed by December 1955 in time for the summer holidays. The road provided a scenic circuit drive between Nambour, Bli Bli, Dunethin Rock and Yandina. During this period a gravel road providing access to the summit of the rock was completed. A small simple wooden picnic shelter and water tank was also built near the summit for visitors.

During the 1950s, the Maroochy River began to silt up and for a number of years Percy Evans used a shallow draft boat, M.V. Miss Maroochy to transport passengers to Dunethin Rock. After more than forty years of service Evans sold his business in 1967. A number of operators have since continued to operate cruises up the Maroochy River to Dunethin Rock.

Dunethin Rock and its surrounds appear to have remained relatively unchanged since its mid-20th century visitation heyday. The site currently receives a smaller percentage of visitors compared to more prominent scenic locations on the Blackall Range. The buildings of the Maroochy River School of Arts and State School, closed in 1963 and 1972 respectively, are no longer in existence. While native vegetation surrounding the summit has obscured some southerly views, an extensive panorama can still be appreciated from Dunethin Rock. The area below the rock along the river remains a popular picnic site for locals and for those who make use of the boat ramp near the junction with Dunethin Lake built by Maroochy Shire Council in the 1990s.

== Description ==
Approximately five kilometres southeast of the township of Yandina, the beauty spot of Dunethin Rock stands on the south bank of the Maroochy River to the east edge of Lake Dunethin. North of the Yandina-Bli Bli Road at the termination of Dunethin Rock Road, the rocky outcrop provides opportunities for taking in sweeping panoramas from the Blackall Range to the coast. Features within these panoramas include the mountains of Ninderry Range, Mount Coolum and Cooroy Mountain, areas of lush vegetation, sugar cane fields and farmland and the winding course of the meandering Maroochy River.

The flat area below the rocky outcrop runs along the river bank and beside the lake and accommodates a concrete boat ramp, small timber jetty and adjoining timber framed picnic shelter with concrete slab floor, concrete picnic tables, and a toilet block (these structures are not part of the heritage listing).

A steep gravelled road climbs to the east from the flat and travels around to the south of the outcrop. A timber picnic shed is perched to the edge of the road and offers teasing glimpses of the expansive views available from the summit. This timber framed picnic shed is sheltered by a hipped roof clad with corrugated iron. The east and west sides are infilled to the lower half with weatherboards and the other sides are open. The shed has a concrete slab floor and accommodates two timber tables with bench seats to their long sides. A rainwater tank stands to the east. The picnic shed is significant for the heritage listing.

A rough path from the road edge is shaded by a range of mature trees and leads to a plateau at the summit, a natural viewing platform. This area of the outcrop is bare except for the occasional rogue vegetation struggling for a foothold and coverings of moss, lichen, dry leaves and twigs.

== Heritage listing ==
Dunethin Rock was listed on the Queensland Heritage Register on 5 February 2009 having satisfied the following criteria.

The place is important in demonstrating the evolution or pattern of Queensland's history.

As a popular picnic spot and destination for excursionists, Dunethin Rock was associated with North Coast (now Sunshine Coast) tourism from as early as 1910. Gazetted as a scenic reserve in 1924, when the North Coast was emerging as a holiday destination for outside visitors, Dunethin Rock's increased popularity as a tourist destination from this period was enhanced through the provision of access by motor launches on the Maroochy River and Moreton Mill tram line, key components of Maroochy Shire's early tourist transport network. Road access to Dunethin Rock was improved during the 1950s in response to the rise of motor transport that occurred Australia-wide in this period.

The place is important in demonstrating the principal characteristics of a particular class of cultural places.

Dunethin Rock illustrates the principal characteristics of an early beauty spot primarily accessed by means of a river cruise from a seaside resort, including scenic amenity and opportunities for leisure and relaxation.

Accommodating picnic tables and seats within a robust timber framed and clad structure, the picnic shed near the summit of the rock is a fine example of this shelter type designed in the 1950s and commonly found in picnic areas in south-east Queensland.

The place is important because of its aesthetic significance.

Situated on a tranquil stretch of the upper Maroochy River, viewed from land and river Dunethin Rock is the dominant feature of this place, long valued for its natural beauty. From its summit, Dunethin Rock offers a fine panorama extending from the Blackall Ranges to the coast, offering expansive views of the mountains Ninderry, Coolum and Cooroy, sugarcane fields, native vegetation and the winding Maroochy River. The esplanade between Dunethin Rock and Dunethin Lake offers the opportunity for relaxation in a river setting.
