= Koongalba =

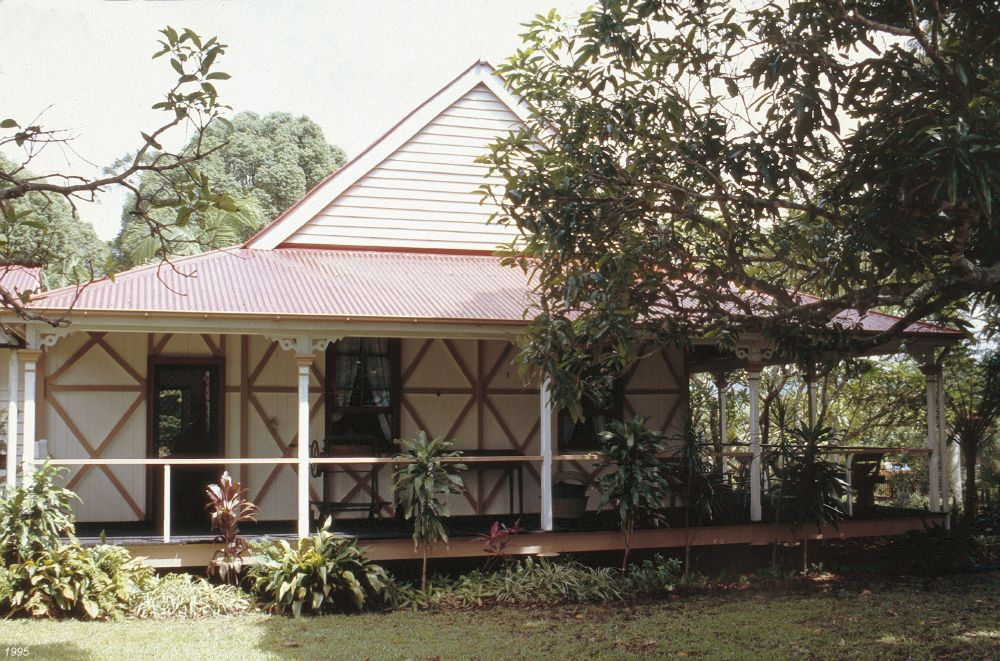
- Koongalba, 1995

- Location within Queensland Location within Australia
- 26.5681°S 152.9587°E
- Location: 12 Wharf Street, Yandina, Sunshine Coast Region, Queensland, Australia

History
- Design period: 1870s–1890s (late 19th century)
- Built: 1894–1920s

Queensland Heritage Register
- Official name: Koongalba, John Low's House
- Type: state heritage (landscape, built)
- Designated: 4 July 1995
- Reference no.: 601613
- Significant period: 1890s–1920s (fabric); 1890s (historical)
- Significant components: driveway, views from, residential accommodation – main house, garden/grounds, trees/plantings, tennis court site

Koongalba is a heritage-listed detached house at 12 Wharf Street, Yandina, Sunshine Coast Region, Queensland, Australia. It was built from 1894 to 1920s. It is also known as John Low's House. It was added to the Queensland Heritage Register on 4 July 1995.

== History ==
This single-storeyed timber house was erected in 1894 for John Anthony Low, a prominent member of the Maroochy community during the late nineteenth and early twentieth centuries. Low was the eldest son of James Low who was actively involved in the development of the timber industry in the Mooloolah - Maroochy area and the development of Yandina from the 1860s.

Following investigation of the timber resources of the Mooloolah–Maroochy region by Tom Petrie c. 1862, timber-getters commenced work in the area. James Low and William Grigor are recorded as having moved to the Mooloolah area in 1863 where, in partnership with William Pettigrew, they sent timber from the Mooloolah area to Pettigrew's sawmill in Brisbane. In 1867 James and his family moved north to a site on the Maroochy River opposite Dunethin Rock, where he established a depot located on the then route to the Gympie gold diggings; gold having been discovered at Gympie in 1867. James is recorded as one of the first selectors of land in the district under the Crown Lands Act of 1868. A post office, with James as Post Master, opened in July 1868 and took its name from the Yandina run on which it was situated.

A new road was constructed between Brisbane and Gympie in 1868. The new road was approximately 4 miles (6.4 km) west of the previous route, and James moved his family to the point where the new road crossed the Maroochy River, and where he re-established his store and the Post Office, and opened a butcher shop and Maroochie House which was licensed in 1869. The store and hotel were located on the south bank of the Maroochy River, east of the Brisbane–Gympie Road. The Low family lived in the rear of the hotel, which was used by travellers on Cobb and Co's passenger service.

The Maroochy River provided an important means of transportation of goods and timber. The position of James' store and hotel along the Gympie Road, and adjacent to the Maroochy River provided a focus for trade in the Maroochy area, with customers being drawn from a wide area. The town of Yandina was surveyed in 1871, and a telegraph office was built approximately half a mile south of James' store in 1873. James was active in the development of community facilities in the Yandina district, convening a meeting in 1879 which resolved to approach the government to establish a school in the area.

James acquired a large area of land around the Maroochy River, on which he grazed cattle and cut timber, in addition to his business enterprises.

Following James' death in 1883, his widow Christina continued to run the store and post office. Christina also ran a boarding house in the hotel; the liquor license having lapsed on James' death. The North Coast railway line from Brisbane to Gympie opened in 1891, at which time the post office was removed to the railway station. The area around the south bank of the Maroochy River declined in importance as a commercial centre, and the hotel was eventually demolished.

John took over James' timber and grazing businesses upon his father's death, continuing to cut, haul and raft timber. In 1893 John became engaged to Louisa Ann Bury, and prepared to erect a new house. John acquired two half acre allotments on opposite sides of Wharf Street from James' estate, and planned to use the allotment on the southern side for the house, and the land on the northern side for the garden.

John kept very detailed books, and his arrangements for the house are recorded in these books, including copies of orders for timber, joinery and hardware to complete the house which was built by Willie Grigor. Willie was the son of William Grigor, a longstanding family friend of the Lows, and James' former partner in the Mooloolah area. Family records note that John planned his house to be similar to Christina's home Coondalbour, built in 1889 a short distance from the site of John's house. John and Louisa were married in January 1894, and the house was completed the following May.

Like James, John was actively involved in the development of the Yandina and Maroochy areas, and held various positions including a member of the Maroochy Divisional Board, electoral presiding officer for Yandina, an auditor for the Moreton Central Sugar Mill in Nambour, Justice of the Peace, Secretary of the Maroochy Cemetery Committee in Yandina, and a member of the committees of the Maroochy Provisional School and the Yandina State School. John also worked as a valuer in the district.

John died in 1914 following an accident whilst timber-getting. Louisa continued to live at the house, where she established a large garden. Louisa died in 1957, and the house remained vacant until 1970, at which time it was purchased by Jim and Audienne Blyth, granddaughter of John and Louisa Low.

The shingles on the roof of the house were replaced with corrugated iron c. 1914. The rear verandah was enclosed at around this time, and eventually became the new kitchen area when the original detached kitchen was dismantled. Further work undertaken to the house during the 1920s included restumping the house with concrete stumps, building a tennis court and front path, and further tree planting. By 1970 the house was in a deteriorated condition. Renovations undertaken included removal of the outside wall of the rear verandah, replacement of most of the verandah flooring, and the erection of a new detached kitchen/bathroom/laundry wing connected to the main house by an open walkway. The rear verandah has since been enclosed and a family room added in place of the open walkway.

The house was named Koongalba in 1994, to mark the 100th anniversary of the erection of the house. Koongalba, meaning "place of clean water" is the Aboriginal name for the area around the Maroochy River at Yandina.

== Description ==
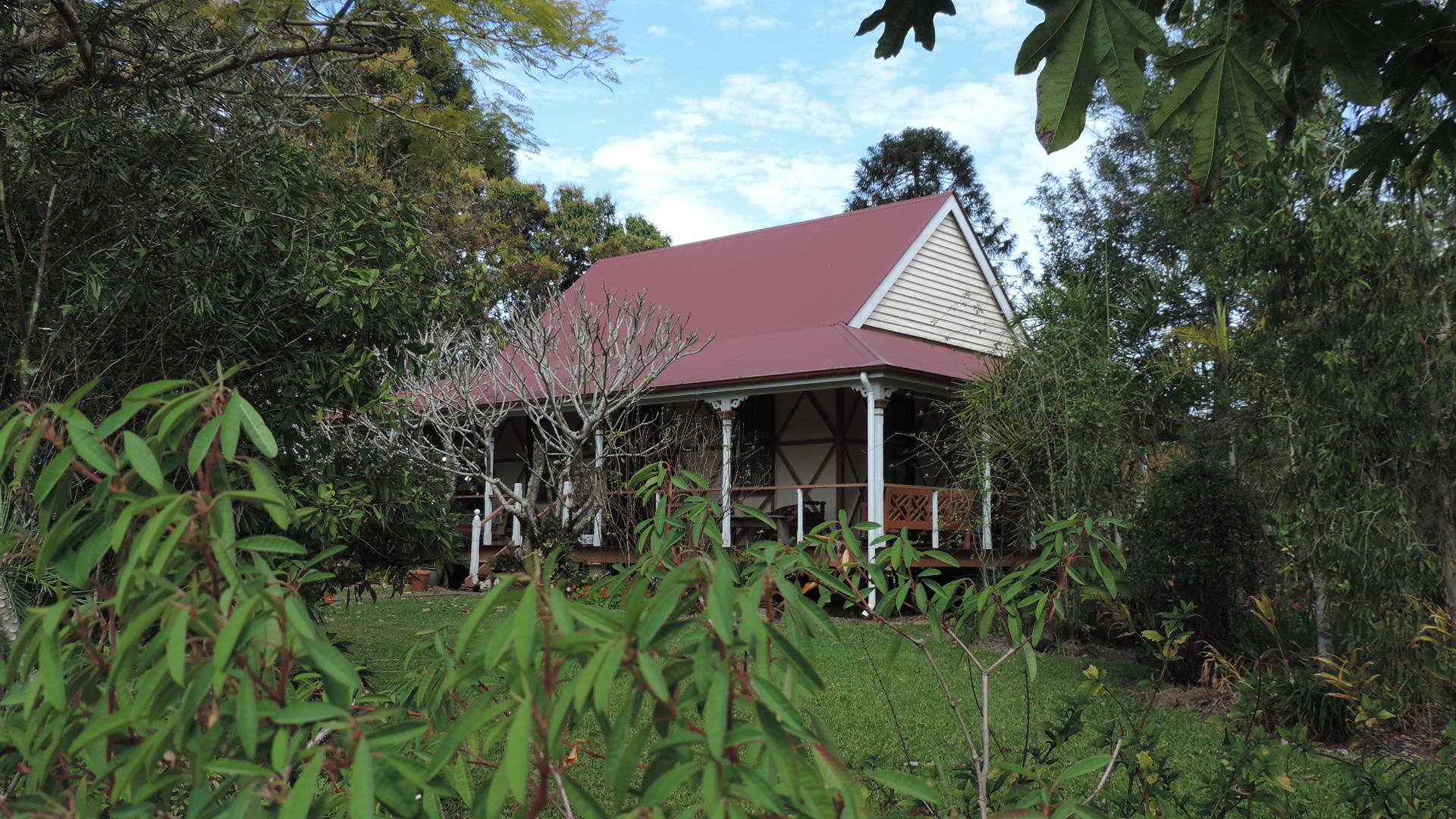
Koongalba, 2015

Koongalba, a single-storeyed timber and iron residence, is located on a level site at the crest of a hill fronting Wharf Street to the north. The residence, consisting of the original building at the front with a later wing added to the rear, has views to the northeast towards the Maroochy River and is surrounded by landscaped grounds with substantial plantings of mature trees.

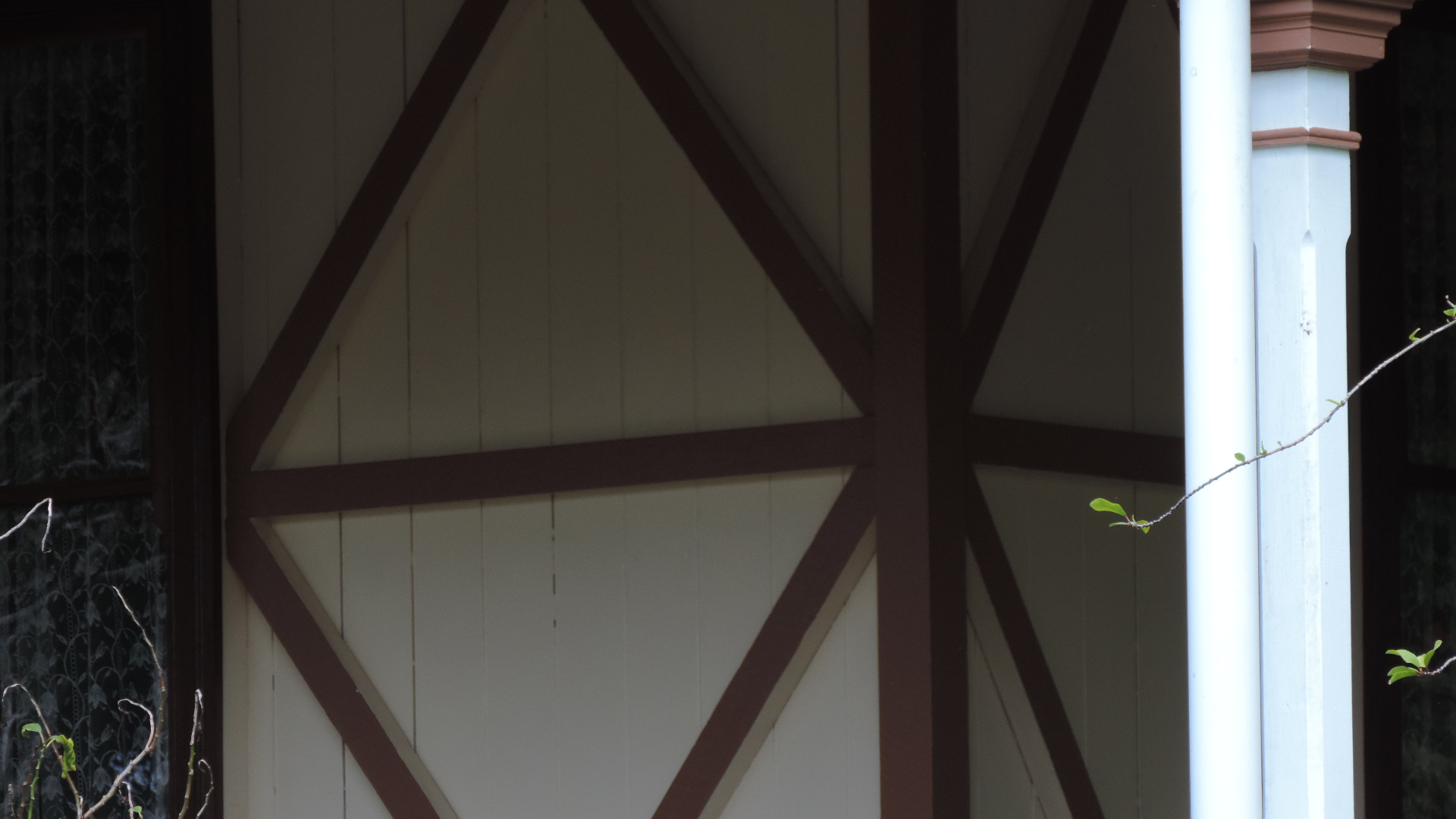
Cross-bracing, 2015

The original building, of four rooms with a central corridor, has a corrugated iron gable roof with skillion roof verandahs to all sides, and timber perimeter stumps with concrete stumps internally. Verandahs have unlined ceilings, chamfered timber posts, timber brackets and capitals, a timber handrail with central support, and retains some of the original beech timber floor boards. Walls have single-skin vertical boarding with external cross-bracing, and gable ends have weatherboard cladding and timber finials. The building is entered via central front steps and a panelled cedar front door with glass sidelights and fanlight. The rear verandah has been enclosed and provides access to the rear wing, but retains verandah fittings and features a similar central door, sidelight and fanlight assembly to the front. Each room has a two cedar sash windows to the verandahs.

Internally, the building has beech timber framing with beaded pine vertically jointed boarding, pine internal doors and boarded ceilings. The building has timber skirtings, architraves, cornices and ceiling roses, and the corridor wall to the northwest room has been removed.

The rear wing has a corrugated iron hipped roof, weatherboard cladding, concrete stumps and timber sash and casement windows. This structure is long and narrow in plan, and was originally freestanding with a covered walkway linking it to the original building. The space between the two structures was enclosed to create the living room for the rear wing, which also contains the kitchen, bathroom, laundry and garage.

The landscaped grounds contain a number of mature trees, including an avenue of seven large camphor laurels along the western side of the property forming the driveway, and two camphor laurels to the southwest of the house near a recent metal shed. Bunya pines are located along the southern boundary, and two mango trees, a silky oak, and two Illawarra flame trees are located around the northeast side of the property.

== Heritage listing ==
Koongalba was listed on the Queensland Heritage Register on 4 July 1995 having satisfied the following criteria.

The place is important because of its aesthetic significance.

The residence, with its landscaped grounds and plantings of mature trees, makes a considerable contribution to the amenity of the Wharf Street streetscape and the Yandina townscape.

The place has a special association with the life or work of a particular person, group or organisation of importance in Queensland's history.

As a building erected on land which has been continuously owned by members of the Low family from the late 1860s, Koongalba is important for its association with the family which was influential in the development of the timber industry in the Mooloolah-Maroochy area, and in the development of Yandina as a commercial centre from the late 1860s.
