= Bridges, Queensland =

Bridges
- Suburb
- Interactive map of Bridges
- Coordinates: 26.54°S 152.9427°E
- Country: Australia
- State: Queensland
- City: Sunshine Coast
- LGA: Sunshine Coast Region
- Location: 11.7 km (7.3 mi) N of Nambour; 113 km (70 mi) N of Brisbane

Government
  - State electorates: Nicklin; Ninderry
  - Federal division: Fairfax

Area
  - Total: 9.9 km^{2} (3.8 sq mi)

Population
  - Total: 295 (2021 census)
  - Density: 29.80/km^{2} (77.2/sq mi)
- Time zone: UTC+10:00 (AEST)
- Postcode: 4561
Suburbs around Bridges
Eerwah Vale	North Arm	North Arm
Cooloolabin	Bridges	Ninderry
Cooloolabin	Yandina	Yandina

Bridges is a rural locality in the Sunshine Coast Region, Queensland, Australia. In the 2021 census, Bridges had a population of 295 people.

== Geography ==
The locality is bounded to the south-east by the North Maroochy River.

The Bruce Highway enters the suburb from the south-east (Yandina) and travels north through the locality, close to its north-eastern boundary before exiting to the north-east (North Arm). The North Coast railway line also enters the suburb from the south-east (Yandina) slightly west of the highway and travels north through the locality, crossing the highway and running immediately parallel and east of the highway, forming the north-eastern boundary of the locality, before exiting to the north-east (North Arm). Bridges railway station (26.5391°S 152.9569°E) once served the locality but it is now abandoned.

The land use is a mixture of rural residential, grazing on native vegetation, and crop growing.

== History ==
The locality takes its name from the Bridges railway station which was namenamed after Sir William Throsby Bridges, the Commander of the First Australian Imperial Force in 1914.

== Demographics ==
In the 2016 census Bridges had a population of 276 people.

In the 2021 census, Bridges had a population of 295 people.

== Education ==
There are no schools in Bridges. The nearest government primary schools are Yandina State School in neighbouring Yandina to the south and North Arm State School in neighbouring North Arm to the north-east. The nearest government secondary school is Nambour State College in Nambour to the south.

== Amenities ==
Parks in the locality include:

- Endiandra Park (26.5386°S 152.9558°E)
- Endiandra Park Bushland Conservation Reserve (26.5394°S 152.9555°E)
