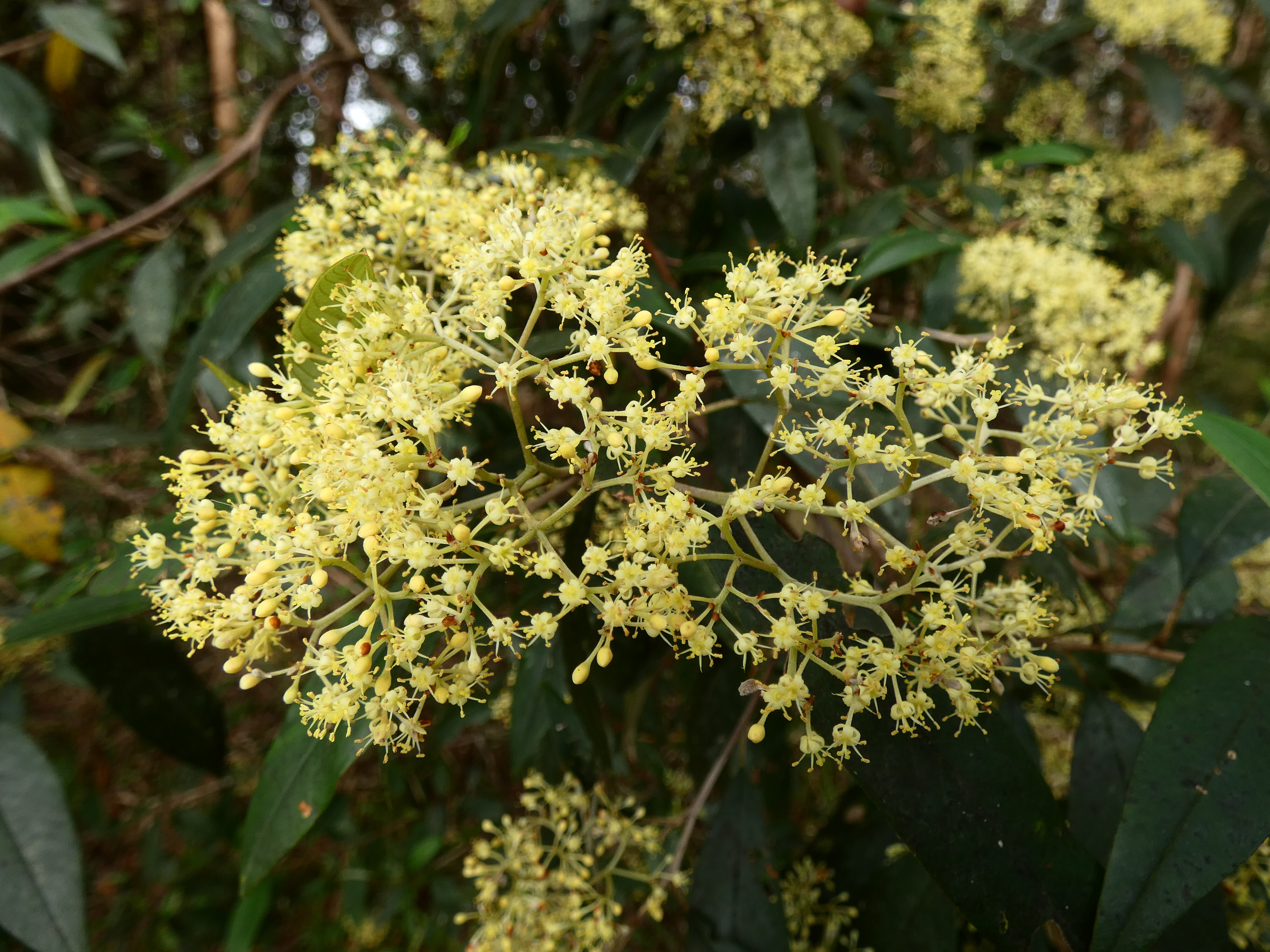
- Flowering on Mount Baldy, Queensland

Scientific classification
- Kingdom: Plantae
- Clade: Embryophytes
- Clade: Tracheophytes
- Clade: Angiosperms
- Clade: Eudicots
- Clade: Rosids
- Order: Rosales
- Family: Rhamnaceae
- Genus: Pomaderris
- Species: P. argyrophylla

Binomial name
- Pomaderris argyrophylla N.A.Wakef.

= Pomaderris argyrophylla =

Silver pomaderris

Species of shrub

Pomaderris argyrophylla, commonly known as silver pomaderris, is a species of flowering plant in the family Rhamnaceae and is endemic to north-eastern Australia. It is a shrub or small tree with lance-shaped leaves and white to cream-coloured or yellow flowers.

== Description ==
Pomaderris argyrophylla is a shrub or small tree that typically grows to a height of 1–6 m (3 ft 3 in – 19 ft 8 in), its new growth covered with coppery-coloured hairs. The leaves are lance-shaped to elliptic, 50–120 mm (2.0–4.7 in) long and 15–30 mm (0.59–1.18 in) wide on a petiole 6–13 mm (0.24–0.51 in) long with narrowly triangular stipules 4.5–5.5 mm (0.18–0.22 in) long at the base. The lower surface of the leaves is covered with felt-like white hairs. The flowers are borne in panicles and are white to cream-coloured or yellow, each flower on a pedicel about 2–4 mm (0.079–0.157 in) long. The sepals are 1.3–2.0 mm (0.051–0.079 in) long, there are usually no petals, and the stamens are about 1.5 mm (0.059 in) long. The fruit is about 3.0–3.5 mm (0.12–0.14 in) long and covered with long, silvery-grey hairs.

== Taxonomy ==
Pomaderris argyrophylla was first formally described in 1951 by Norman Arthur Wakefield in The Victorian Naturalist from specimens collected by Cyril Tenison White on the Blackall Range near Cooloolabin in 1943. The specific epithet (argyrophylla) means "silvery-leaved".

== Distribution and habitat ==
This pomaderris grows in moist forest, often in gullies, at altitudes between 400 and 1,100 m (1,300 and 3,600 ft) and occurs from north-east Queensland and south to the Barrington Tops in New South Wales.
