= Eerwah Vale, Queensland =

Eerwah Vale Sunshine Coast, Queensland
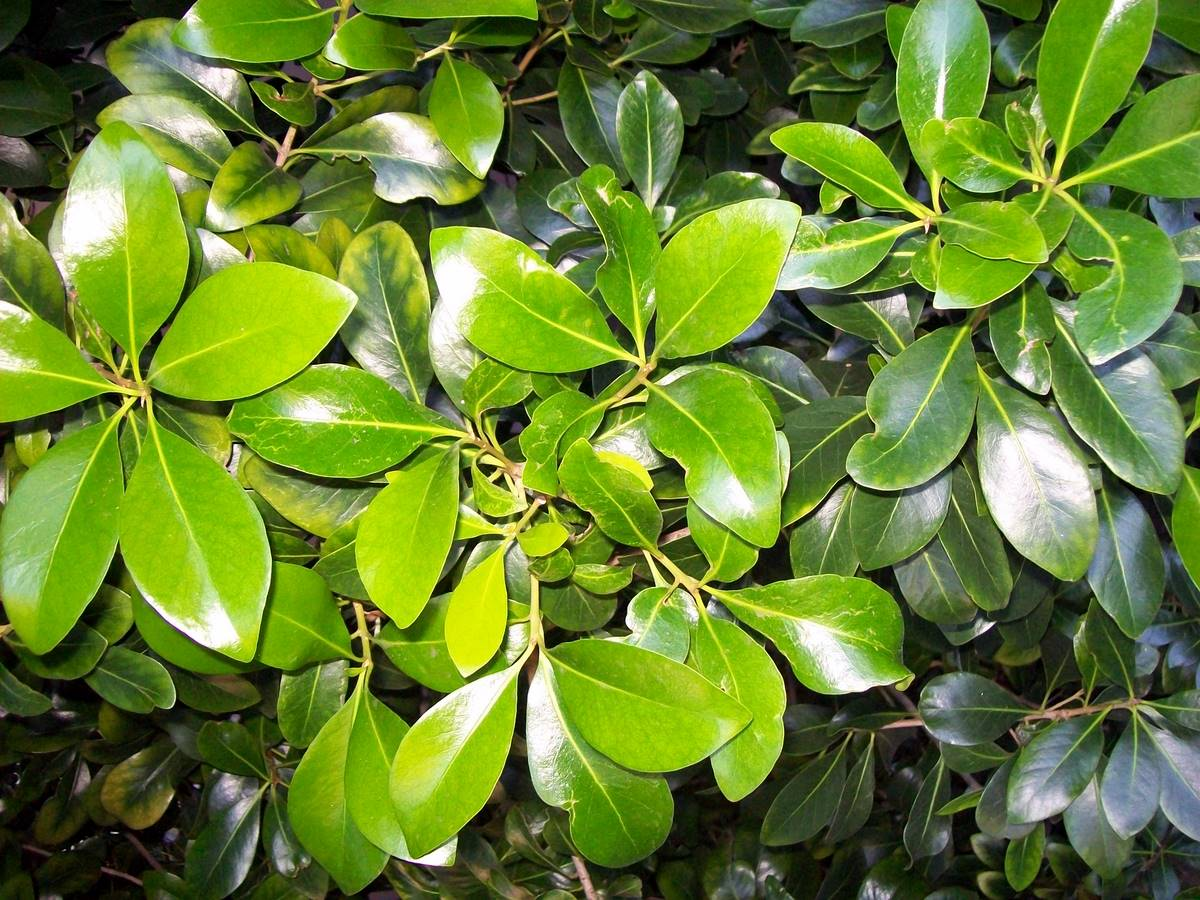
- Planchonella eerwah or Pouteria eerwah

- Coordinates: 26.4816°S 152.9094°E
- Population: 671 (2021 census)
  - Density: 21.23/km^{2} (55.00/sq mi)
- Postcode(s): 4562
- Area: 31.6 km^{2} (12.2 sq mi)
- Time zone: AEST (UTC+10:00)
- Location: 20.7 km (13 mi) SSE of Pomona; 23.4 km (15 mi) SW of Tewantin; 24.1 km (15 mi) N of Nambour; 127 km (79 mi) n of Brisbane CBD
- LGA(s): Shire of Noosa; Sunshine Coast Region
- State electorate(s): Nicklin; Ninderry
- Federal division(s): Wide Bay; Fairfax
Suburbs around Eerwah Vale:
Cooroy	Cooroy	Eumundi
Belli Park	Eerwah Vale	Eumundi
Belli Park	Cooloolabin	North Arm

Eerwah Vale is a locality split between the Sunshine Coast Region and Shire of Noosa, both in Queensland, Australia. In the 2021 census, Eerwah Vale had a population of 671 people.

== Geography ==
Part of the northern boundary is marked by the North Maroochy River.

The Bruce Highway passes through the east of Eerwah Vale. East of the Bruce Highway within the locality is Main Camp Road. Mount Eerwah is centrally located and protected within the Mount Eerwah Conservation Park.

== History ==
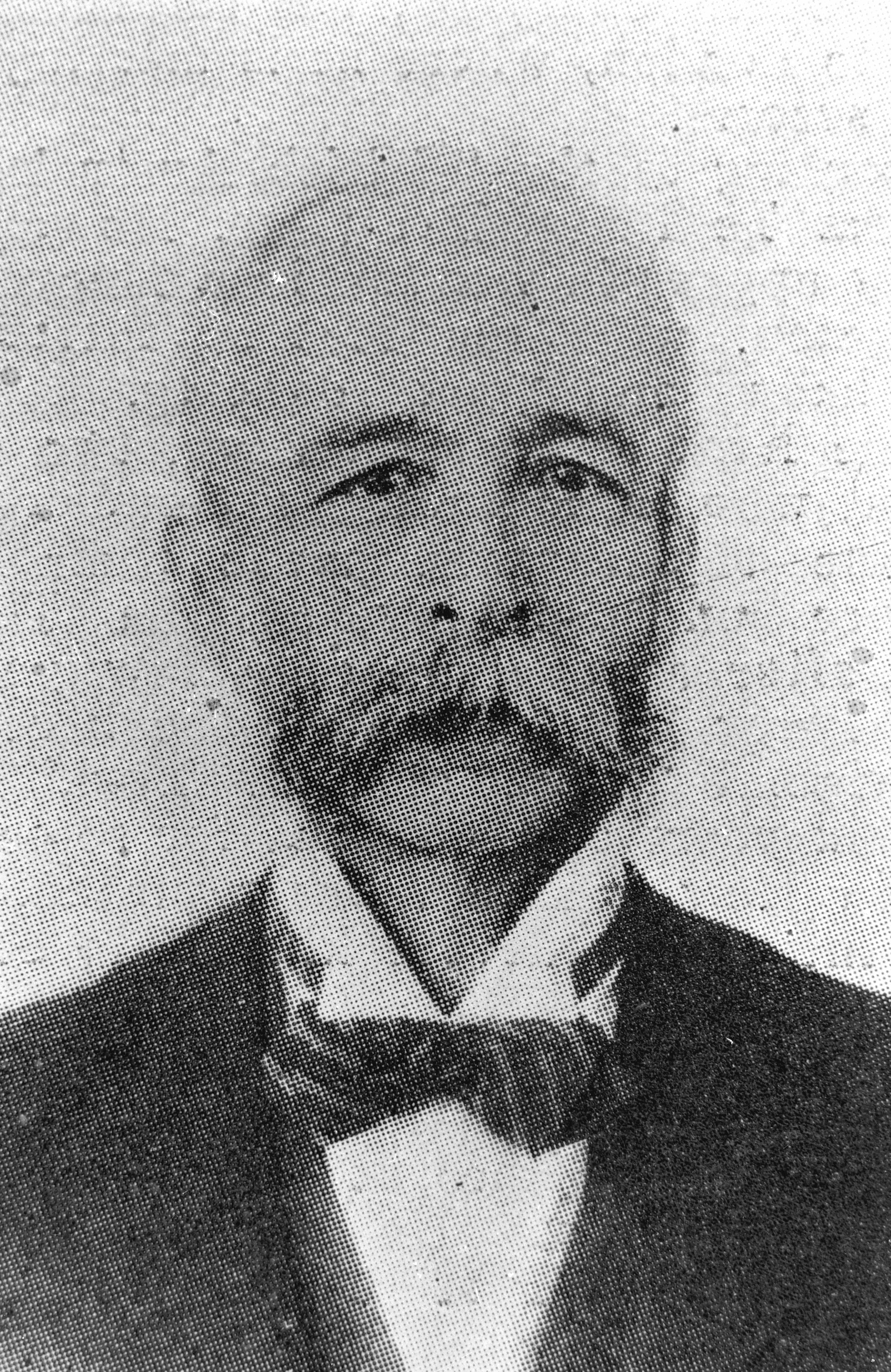
Edward Henry Arundell – Main Camp store and Post Office proprietor, and father of Eumundi Queensland.1905

The township was originally known as Eerwah, after its nearby summit, Mount Eerwah. In 1890, the name of the Eerwah Post Office was changed to Mount Eerwah Post Office. This post office serviced Main Camp during the construction of the Caboolture to Gympie section of the North Coast railway line. It was run by Mr Edward H Arundell.

The first Mount Eerwah Provisional School operated from 1890 to 1891 and was for the children of railway construction workers.

After the railway line was completed, settlement moved closer to the new Eumundi railway station.

The second Mount Eerwah State School opened on 22 July 1913 and closed on 31 May 1917. It was situated on the Eumundi Kenilworth Road (opposite Ceylon Road). This area was known as "Koojarewon" but a State School of a similar name already existed at Highfields, near Toowoomba, so it changed to Mount Eerwah. This school building was later moved to become the Brown's Creek Provisional School.

Brown's Creek State School opened on 29 January 1918 and closed on 23 August 1936. This school was located on the south side of King Creek near its junction with Browns Creek, in the locality currently called Eerwah Vale.

In 1924, the first mention of Eerwah Vale locality was in relation to the local residents unanimously deciding to build a public hall at "Eerwah Vale".

Eerwah Vale Provisional School opened on 15 June 1925. In 1932, it became Eerwah Vale State School. It closed in 1963. It was at 438 Eumundi Kenilworth Road (26.4723°S 152.8948°E).

Between 2008 and 2013, the whole of Eerwah Vale (and the rest of the Shire of Noosa) was within Sunshine Coast Region.

== Demographics ==
At the 2011 census, Eerwah Vale had a population of 527 people.

In the 2016 census, Eerwah Vale had a population of 621 people.

In the 2021 census, Eerwah Vale had a population of 671 people.

== Education ==
There are no schools in Eerwah Vale. The nearest government primary schools are Eumundi State School in neighbouring Eumundi to the east, Cooroy State School in neighbouring Cooroy to the north, North Arm State School in neighbouring North Arm to the south-east, and Yandina State School in Yandina to the south-east. The nearest government secondary schools are Noosa District State High School which has its junior campus in Pomona to the north-west and its senior campus in neighbouring Cooroy to the north and Nambour State College in Nambour to the south.

== Notable flora ==
Planchonella eerwah or Pouteria eerwah – Shiny-leaved Condoo, Black Plum, Wild Apple. This species is listed as endangered by the Australian and Queensland Governments.
