= Wappa Dam =

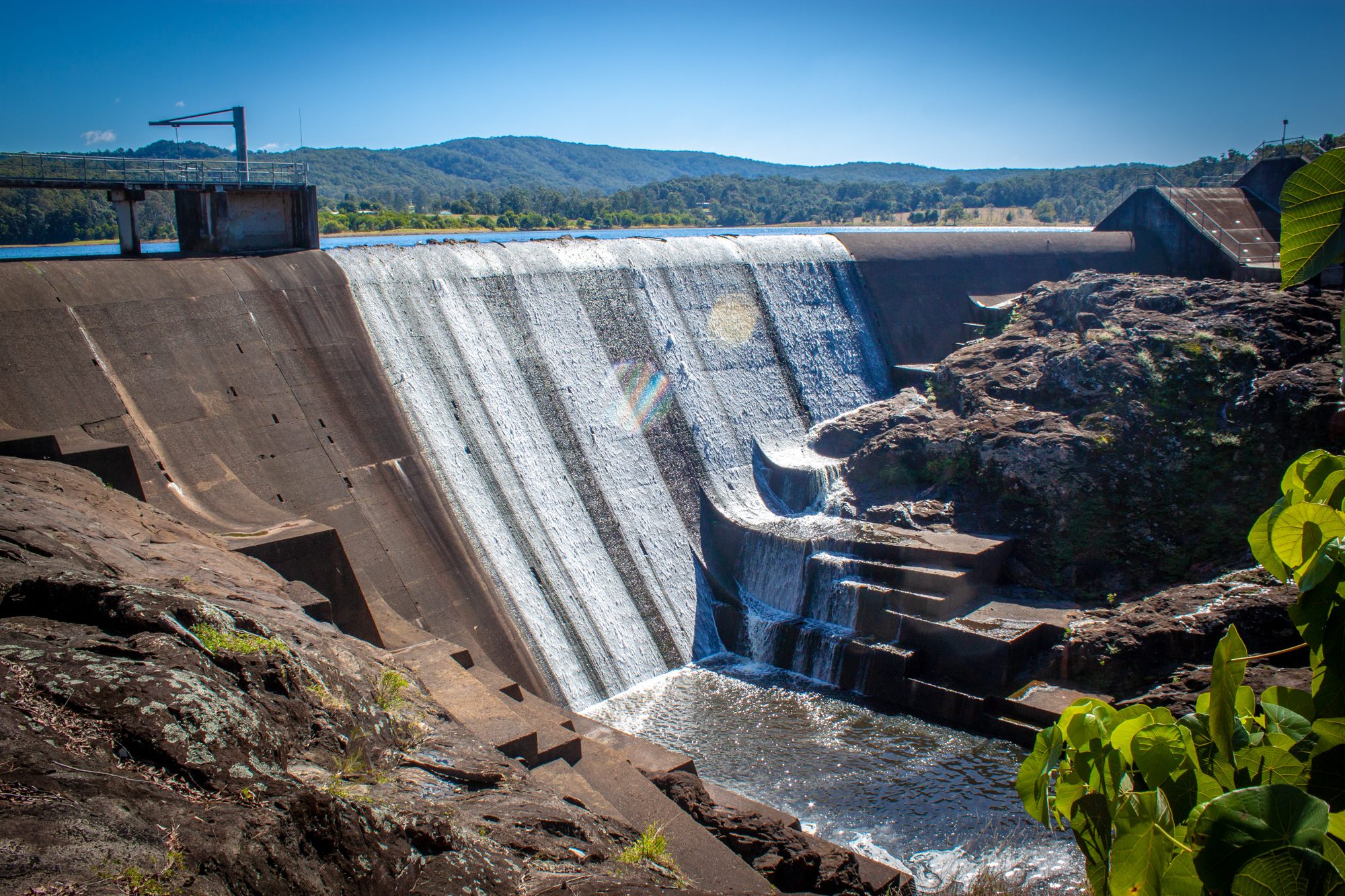
- Wappa Dam, 2018

- Location of the Wappa Dam in Queensland
- Country: Australia
- Location: South East Queensland
- Coordinates: 26°34′12″S 152°55′19″E
- Purpose: Potable water supply
- Status: Operational
- Opening date: 1963
- Operator: SEQ Water

Dam and spillways
- Type of dam: Gravity dam
- Impounds: South Maroochy River
- Height: 24 m (79 ft)
- Length: 138 m (453 ft)
- Dam volume: 12×10^{3} m^{3} (420×10^{3} cu ft)
- Spillway type: Uncontrolled
- Spillway capacity: 1,420 m^{3}/s (50,000 cu ft/s)

Reservoir
- Total capacity: 4,610 ML (1,010×10^{6} imp gal; 1,220×10^{6} US gal)
- Catchment area: 69.7 km^{2} (26.9 sq mi)
- Surface area: 74 ha (180 acres)
- Website www.seqwater.com.au

The Wappa Dam is a mass concrete gravity arch dam with earth-fill abutments and an un-gated spillway across the South Maroochy River in the South East region of Queensland, Australia. The main purpose of the dam is for supply of potable water for the Sunshine Coast region. The impounded reservoir is also called Wappa Dam. The dam and most of the reservoir are within Kiamba with the most northerly part of the reservoir in Cooloolabin, both in the Sunshine Coast Region.

== Location and features ==
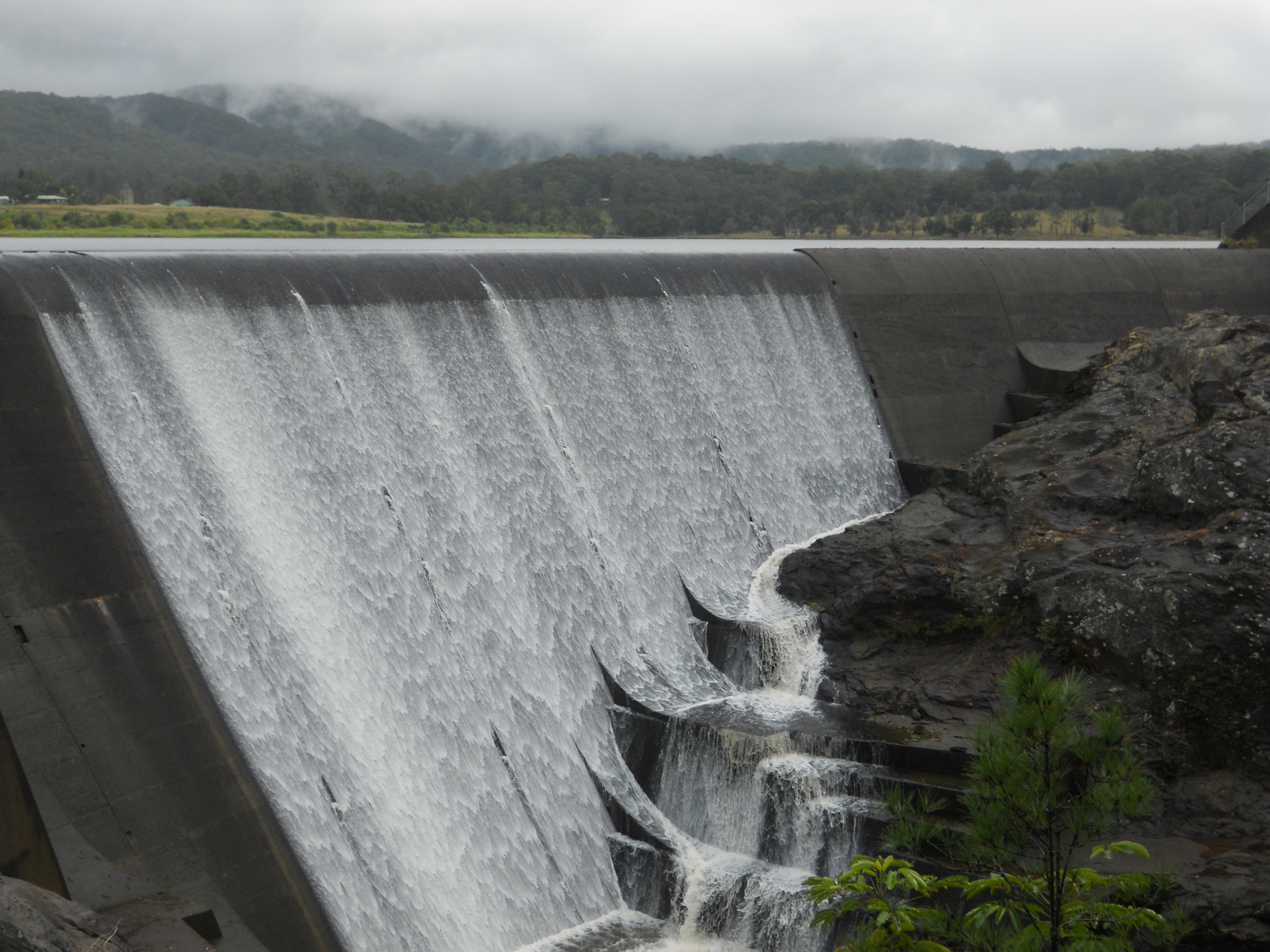
Water pouring over the wall of Wappa Dam, in May 2015.

The dam is located 8 kilometres (5.0 mi) north-west of Nambour.

Completed in 1963, the concrete dam structure is 24 metres (79 ft) high and 138 metres (453 ft) long. The 12-thousand-cubic-metre (420×10^{3} cu ft) dam wall holds back the 4,614-megalitre (1,015×10^{6} imp gal; 1,219×10^{6} US gal) reservoir when at full capacity. From a catchment area of 69.7 square kilometres (26.9 sq mi) with a mean annual rainfall of approximately 1,700 millimetres (67 in) that includes much of the Maroochy River, the dam creates an unnamed reservoir with a surface area of 74 hectares (180 acres). The un–gated spillway has a discharge capacity of 1,420 cubic metres per second (50,000 cu ft/s). Initially managed by the Sunshine Coast Regional Council, management of the dam was transferred to SEQ Water in July 2008 as part of a water security project in the South East Queensland region, known as the South East Queensland Water Grid. The accompanying water treatment plant is also managed by SEQ Water.

== Recreational uses ==
Recreational use of the lake and its surrounding bushland reserve is severely limited, with prohibited recreational activities including swimming, water skiing, diving, mountain biking, horse riding, canoeing and kayaking, camping, and bushwalking. Picnic facilities are available at four locations around the dam, with access prohibited outside of daylight hours.

== See also ==
- List of dams in Queensland
