= Ninderry, Queensland =

Ninderry
- Town
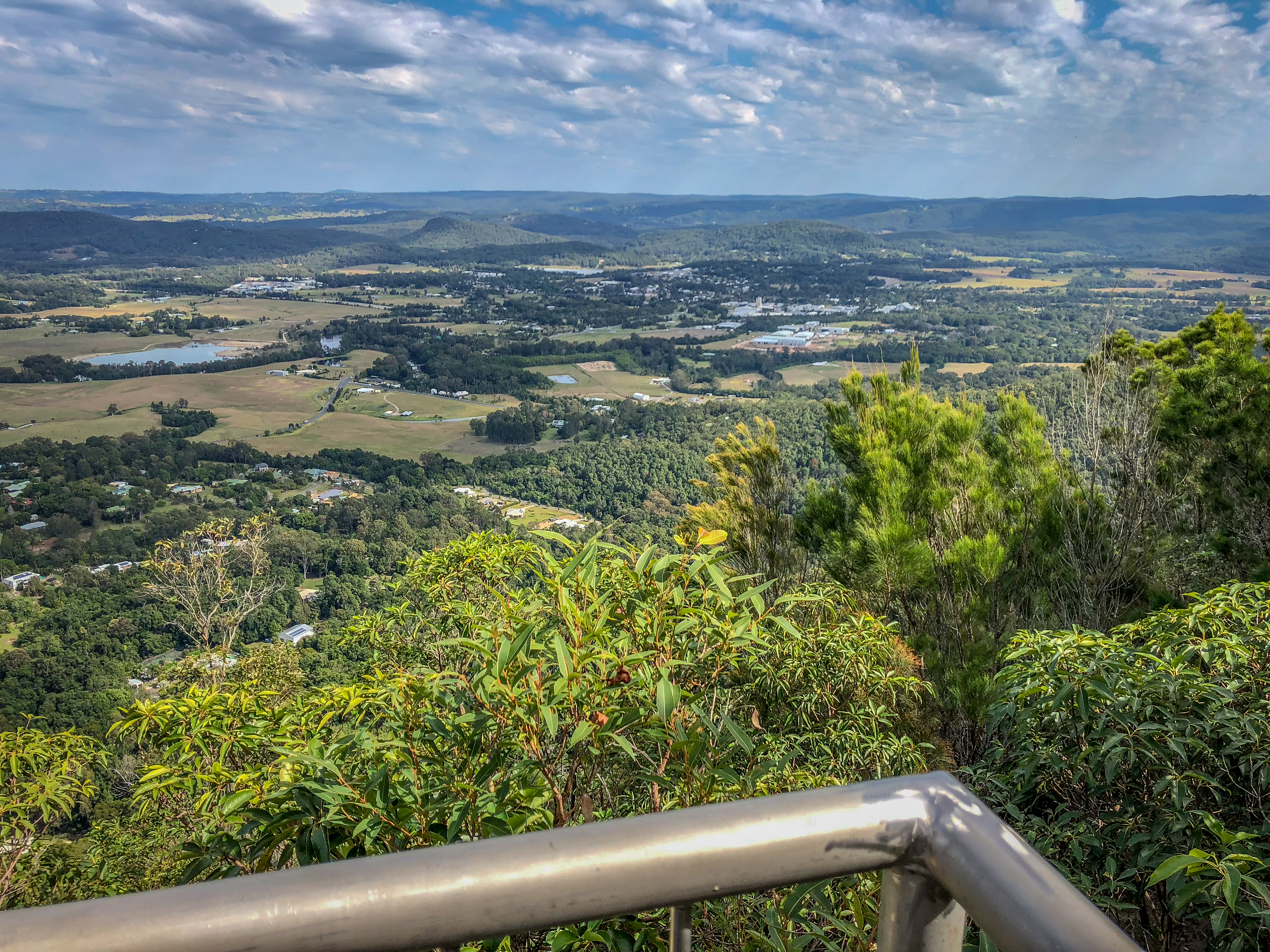
- View of Yandina from Mount Ninderry, 2018

- Interactive map of Ninderry
- Coordinates: 26.5477°S 152.9680°E
- Country: Australia
- State: Queensland
- LGA: Sunshine Coast Region
- Location: 3.0 km (1.9 mi) NE of Yandina; 12.0 km (7.5 mi) N of Nambour; 40.0 km (24.9 mi) NNW of Caloundra; 112 km (70 mi) N of Brisbane

Government
  - State electorate: Ninderry
  - Federal division: Fairfax

Area
  - Total: 8.7 km^{2} (3.4 sq mi)

Population
  - Total: 1,301 (2021 census)
  - Density: 149.5/km^{2} (387.3/sq mi)
- Time zone: UTC+10:00 (AEST)
- Postcode: 4561
Localities around Ninderry
North Arm	North Arm	Valdora
Bridges	Ninderry	Valdora
Yandina	Yandina	Maroochy River

Ninderry is a rural town and locality in the Sunshine Coast Region, Queensland, Australia. In the 2021 census, the locality of Ninderry had a population of 1,301 people.

== Geography ==
The locality is bounded to the north-west by the Bruce Highway and the North Coast railway line and to the south-west by the North Maroochy River. The locality is loosely bounded to the east by the ridgeline of the Ninderry Range.

There are two mountains in the locality

- Fair Hill in the north-west of the locality (26.5385°S 152.9727°E) rising to 148 metres (486 ft) above sea level
- Mount Ninderry in the south-east corner of the locality (26.5524°S 152.9940°E) rising to 312 metres (1,024 ft)

On the outskirts of Yandina, the land use is mostly rural residential but some areas are still used for agriculture.

== History ==
The town takes its name the from Ninderry Range. The name of the range is a corruption of the Kabi language word nyindur / durree, meaning place of scrub leeches.

== Demographics ==
In the 2016 census, the locality of Ninderry had a population of 1,087 people.

In the 2021 census, the locality of Ninderry had a population of 1,301 people.

== Education ==
There are no schools in Ninderry. The nearest government primary schools are Yandina State School in neighbouring Yandina to the south-west and North Arm State School in neighbouring North Arm to the north. The nearest government secondary school is Nambour State College in Nambour to the south.

== Community groups ==
Maroochy Landcare and Maroochy Mooloola Catchment Coordinating Association are both based in Ninderry. Both are affiliated with Landcare Australia.

== Parks ==
There are a number of parks in the area:

- Collins Road Natural Amenity Reserve (26.5486°S 152.9703°E)
- George Best Park (26.5488°S 152.9638°E)
- Honeydew Place Natural Amenity Reserve (26.5318°S 152.9804°E)
- Leach Park (17.7840°S 102.0368°E)
- Mount Ninderry Bushland Conservation Reserve (17.7055°S 102.0057°E)
- North Maroochy River Esplanade – Yandina (17.7027°S 101.9830°E)
- Old Coach Way Bushland Conservation Reserve (26.5373°S 152.9697°E)
- Old Coach Way Park (26.5359°S 152.9701°E)

== Attractions ==
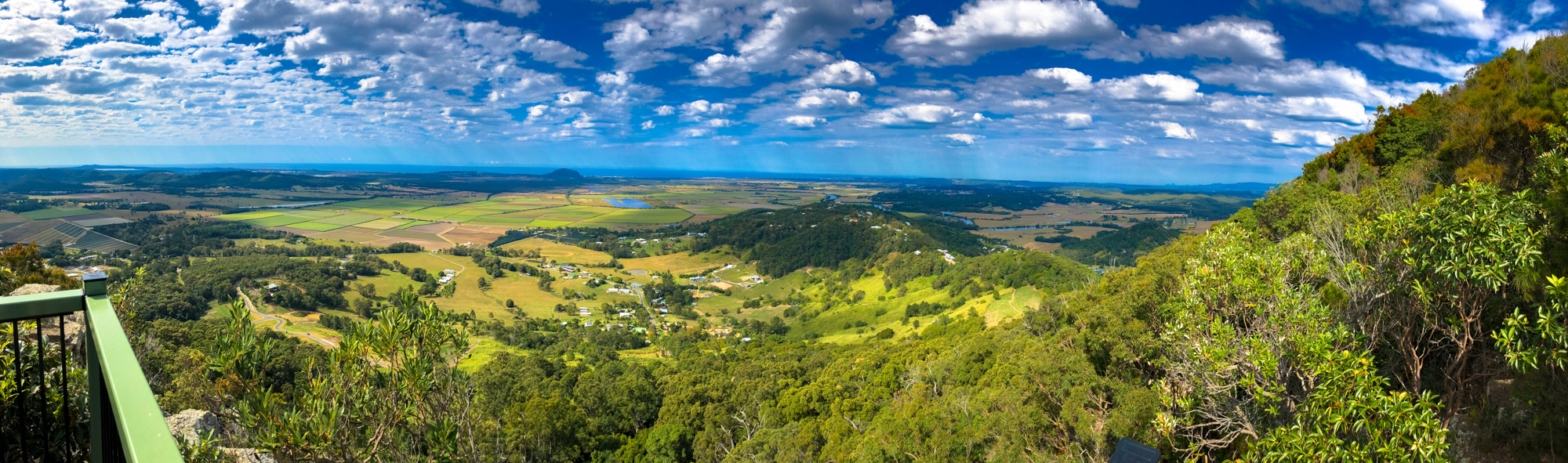
Panorama from Mount Ninderry towards Mount Coolum, 2018

The bushwalk up Mount Ninderry has two lookouts with panoramic views east to Mount Coolum and west to Yandina.
