= Kiamba, Queensland =

Kiamba
- Suburb
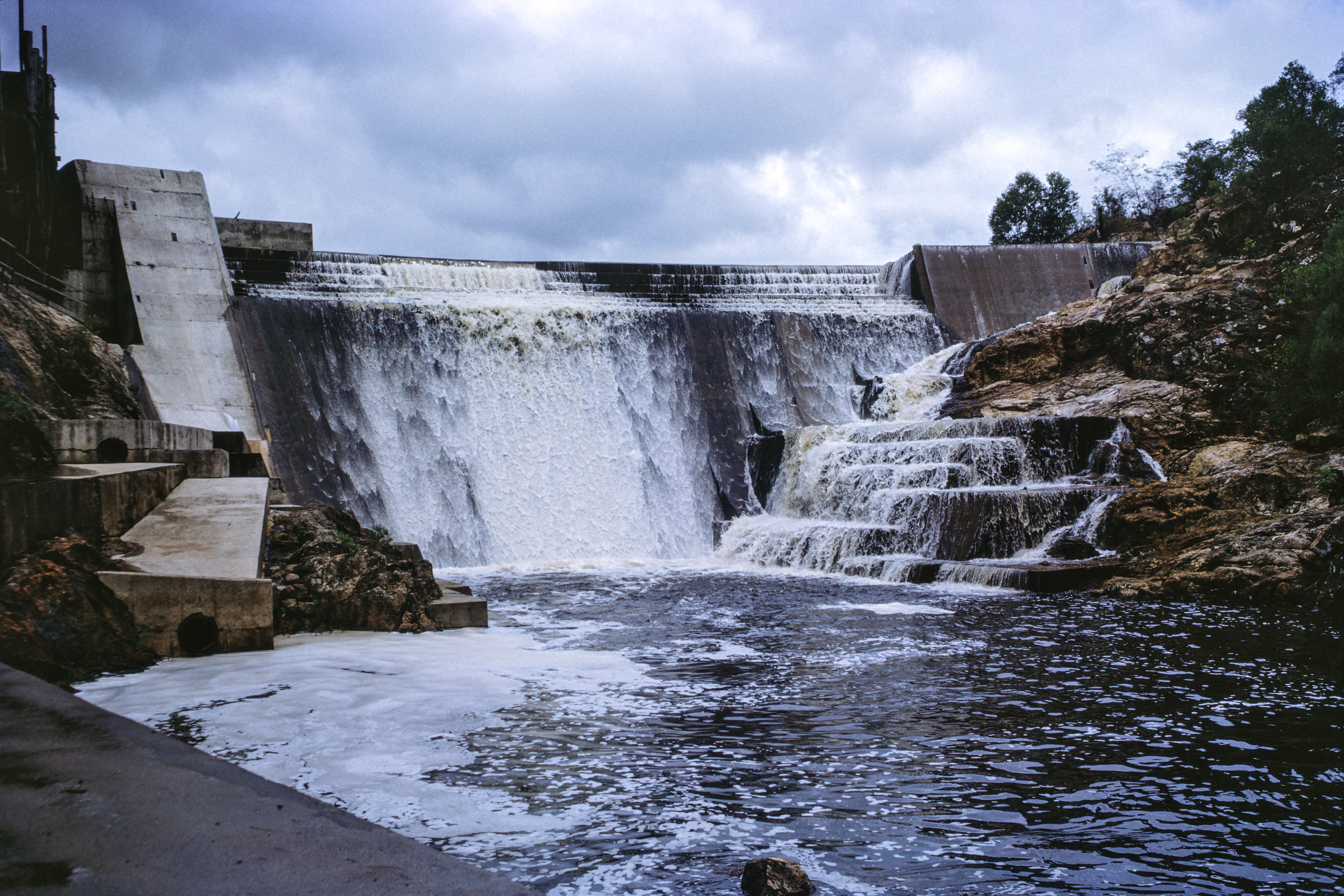
- Wappa Dam spilling, 1964

- Interactive map of Kiamba
- Coordinates: 26.5733°S 152.9094°E
- Country: Australia
- State: Queensland
- LGA: Sunshine Coast Region
- Location: 11.6 km (7.2 mi) NW of Nambour; 41.3 km (25.7 mi) NNW of Caloundra; 126 km (78 mi) N of Brisbane

Government
  - State electorate: Nicklin
  - Federal division: Fairfax

Area
  - Total: 15.5 km^{2} (6.0 sq mi)

Population
  - Total: 191 (2021 census)
  - Density: 12.32/km^{2} (31.92/sq mi)
- Time zone: UTC+10:00 (AEST)
- Postcode: 4560
Suburbs around Kiamba
Cooloolabin	Cooloolabin	Cooloolabin
Gheerulla	Kiamba	Yandina; Kulangoor
Gheerulla	Kureelpa	Image Flat

Kiamba is a rural locality in the Sunshine Coast Region, Queensland, Australia. In the 2021 census, Kiamba had a population of 191 people.

== Geography ==
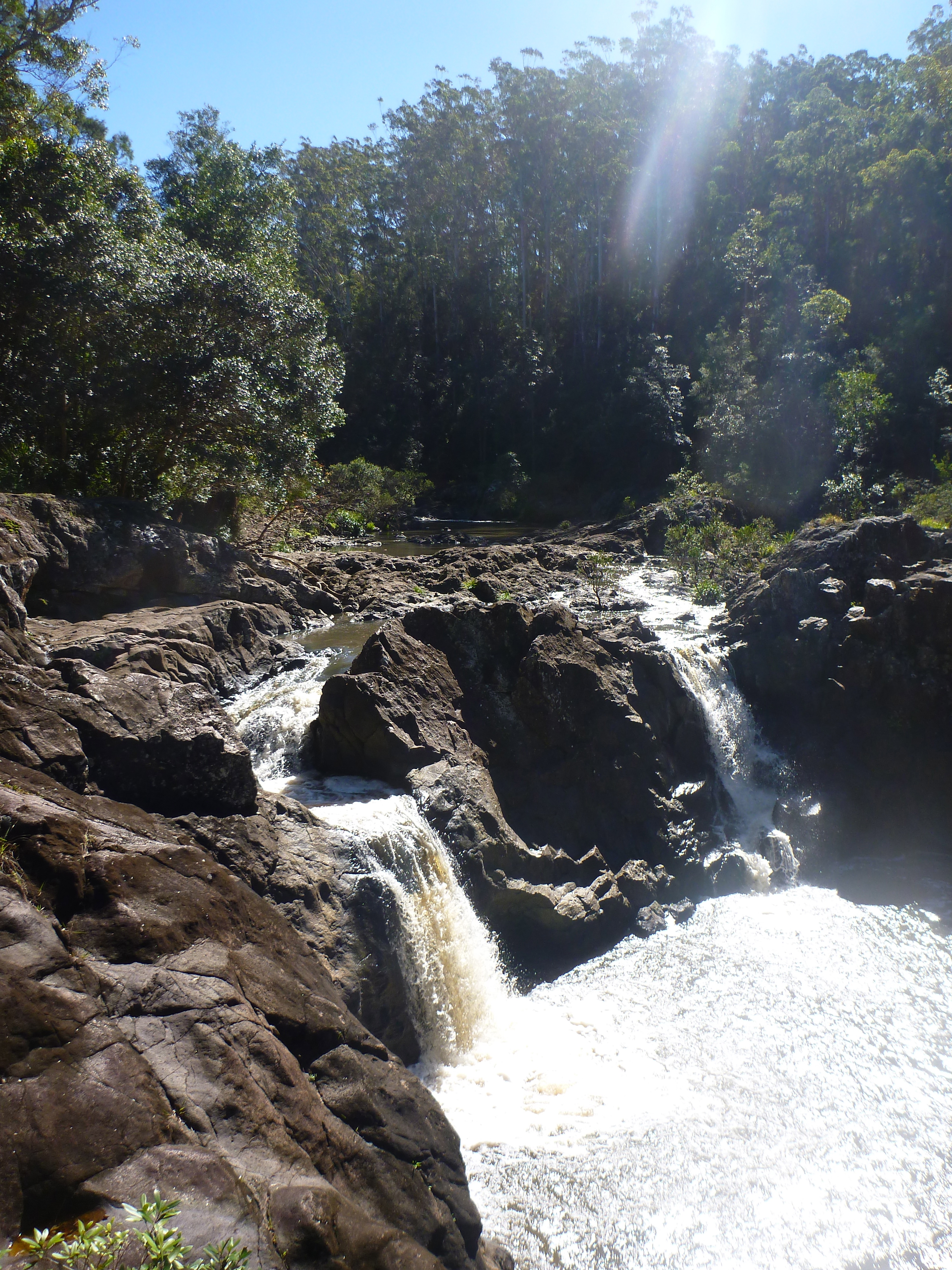
Wappa Falls, 2012

The south branch of the Maroochy River forms much of the southern boundary before flowing to the north-east, where it enters the Wappa Dam (26.5697°S 152.9203°E), also in the locality. Rocky Creek enters from the north-west and flows east to join the South Maroochy above the dam.

There are two waterfalls on the south Maroochy River:

- Kiamba Falls, upstream from the dam (26.5869°S 152.9097°E)
- Wappa Falls, downstream from the dam, at the end of Pump Station Road (26.5708°S 152.9252°E)

== History ==
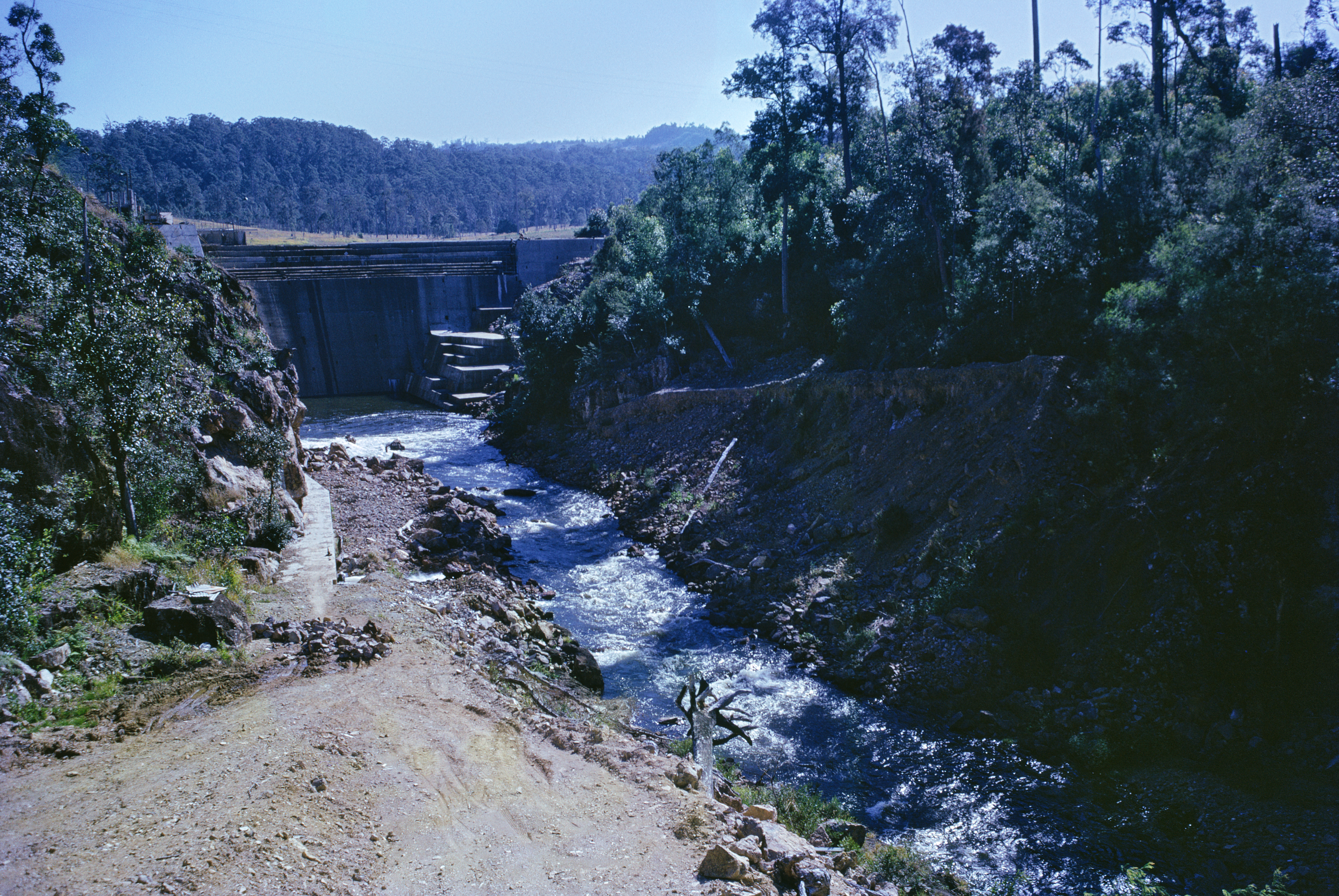
Wappa Dam under construction, 1962

The name Kiamba is reportedly derived from an Aboriginal word Geyambin meaning Cockatoo.

Kiamba State School opened on 28 April 1927 and closed on 28 August 1964. It was on the western side of Kiamba Road (approx 26.57324°S 152.90027°E).

In 1930, the residents of Kiamba purchased the Dulong-Kureelpa Public Hall to relocated to Kiamba using volunteer labour on land acquired from Messrs L and C Duhs. The Kiamba Hall was officially opened on 4 October 1930. The building was 40 by 28 feet (12.2 by 8.5 m). The cost of buying the hall and the land was about £112.

Wappa Dam was built in 1963. The dam wall is 138 metres (453 ft) long and is a concrete gravity arch dam with earth abutments.

== Demographics ==
In the 2016 census, Kiamba had a population of 191 people.

In the 2021 census, Kiamba had a population of 191 people.

== Education ==
There are no schools in Kiamba. The nearest government primary schools are Yandina State School in neighbouring Yandina to the east and Nambour State College (Junior School) in Nambour to the south-east. The nearest government secondary school is Nambour State College.

== Attractions ==
Jack Harrison Park (also known as Wappa Park) is on Wappa Park Road on the banks on the Wappa Dam (26.5714°S 152.9225°E). It provides picnic and playground facilities. It provides good views of the dam when it is spilling and the Wappa Falls is a short walk away.
