= Yandina railway station =

Railway station in Queensland, Australia

Yandina
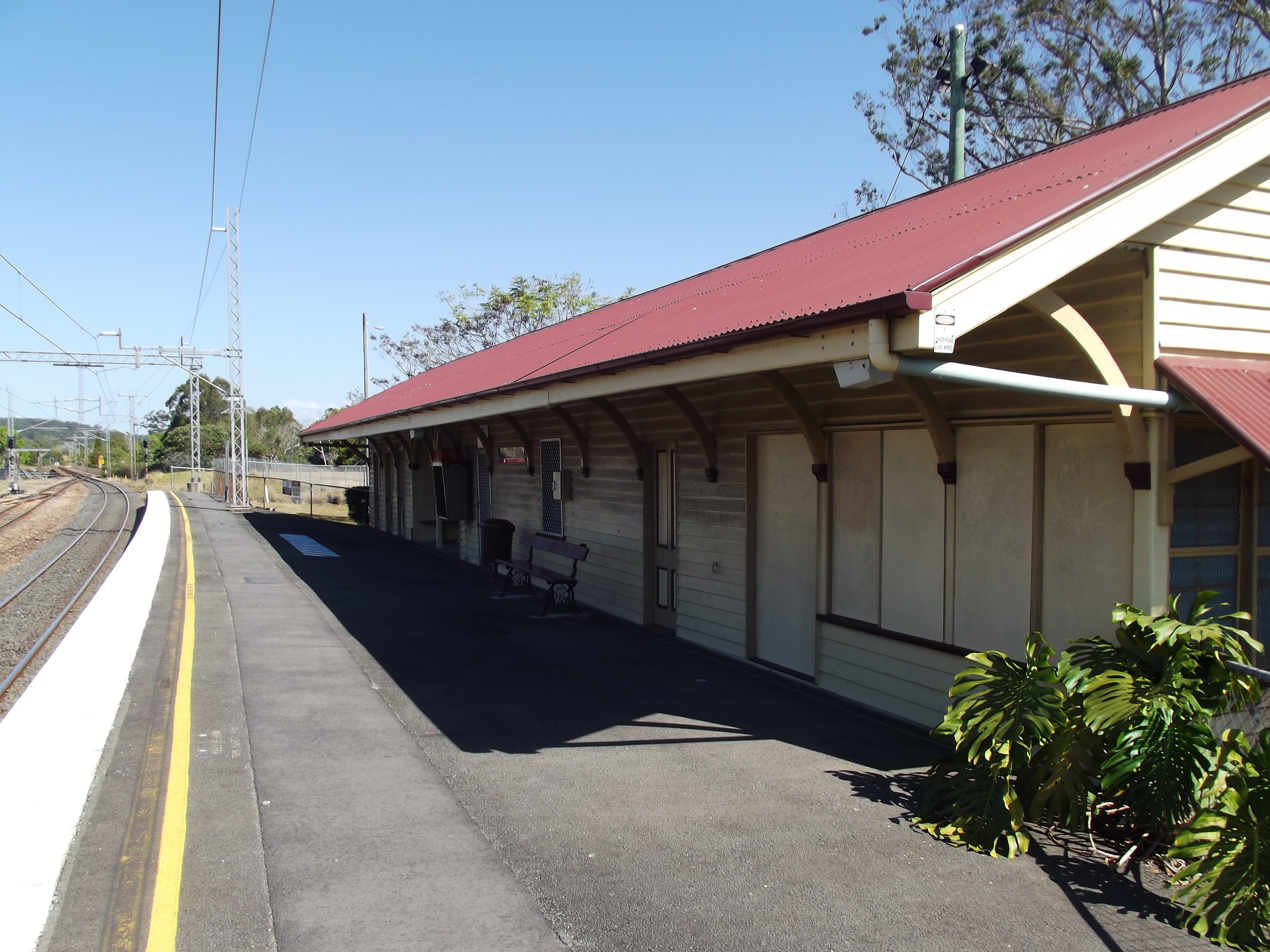
- Southbound view from the station in September 2012

General information
- Location: Railway Street, Yandina
- Coordinates: 26°33′40″S 152°57′29″E
- Owner: Queensland Rail
- Operator: Queensland Rail
- Line: T1 Nambour/Gympie North
- Distance: 112.75 kilometres from Central
- Platforms: 1
- Tracks: 3

Construction
- Structure type: Ground
- Accessible: Yes

Other information
- Status: Unstaffed
- Station code: 600494
- Fare zone: Zone 7
- Website: Queensland Rail

History
- Opened: 30 December 1890; 135 years ago

Services
Preceding station	Queensland Rail	Following station
Nambour towards Roma Street	T1 Nambour/Gympie North line Gympie North service	Eumundi towards Gympie North
Location

Yandina is a railway station operated by Queensland Rail on the Nambour/Gympie North line. It opened in 1890 and serves the Sunshine Coast town of Yandina. It is a ground level station, featuring one side platform.

== History ==
Yandina railway station opened on 30 December 1890, serving as the line's terminus for a period.

The North Coast line through the area was completed in 1891. However a station office building wasn't operational until a while later. The station today consists of one platform with a wooden structure. Opposite the platform lies a passing loop and a Queensland Rail engineering depot.

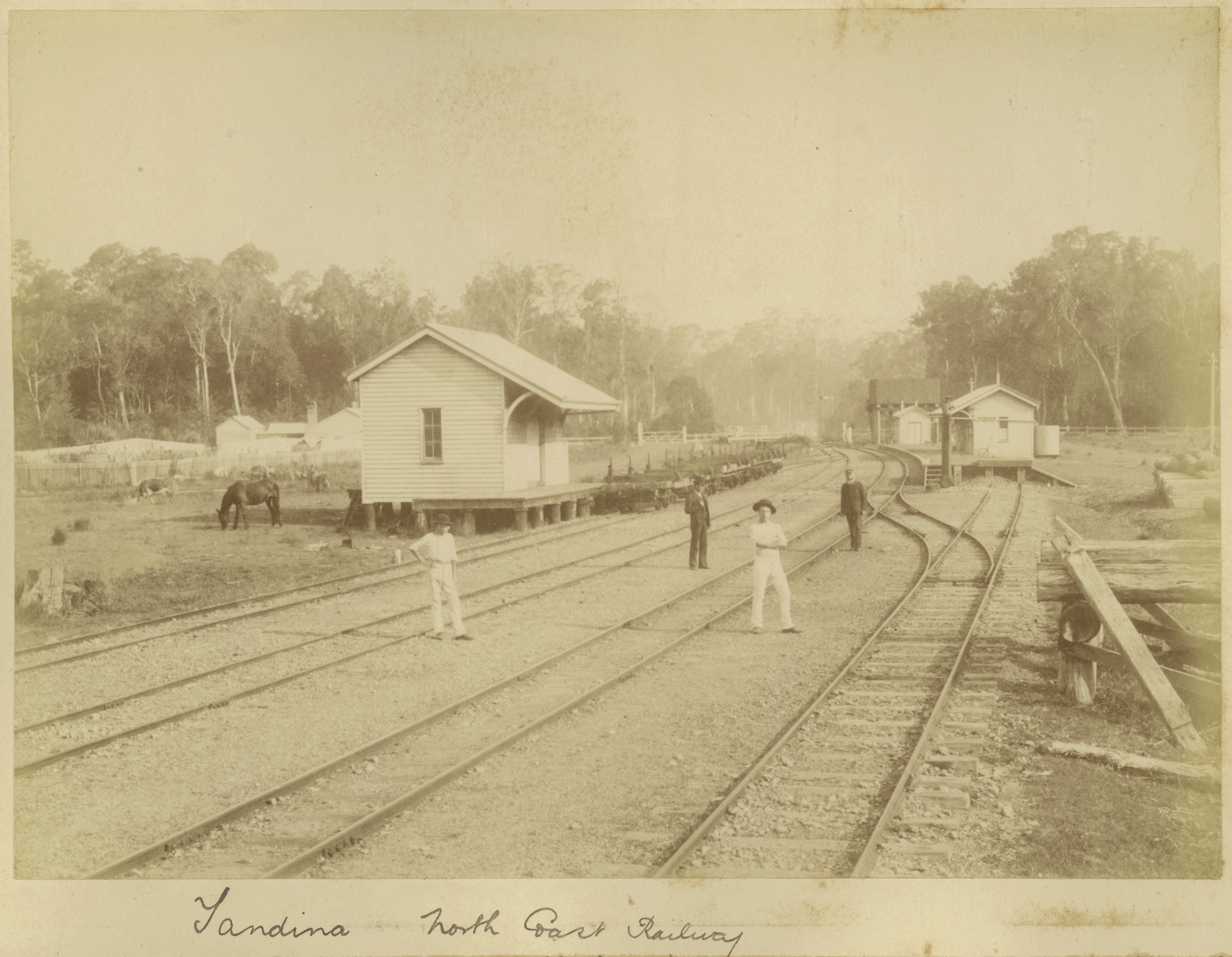
Yandina Station ca 1890

== Services ==
Yandina is serviced by two daily Citytrain network services in each direction.

== Platforms and services ==
Yandina platform arrangement
Platform	Line	Destination	Notes
1	T1 Nambour/Gympie North	Gympie North	
1	T1 Nambour/Gympie North	Roma Street (to Ipswich/Rosewood line)	

== Transport links ==
Kinetic Sunshine Coast's bus route 631 Noosa Junction to Nambour station serves Yandina railway station.
