= Cooloolabin, Queensland =

Cooloolabin
- Suburb
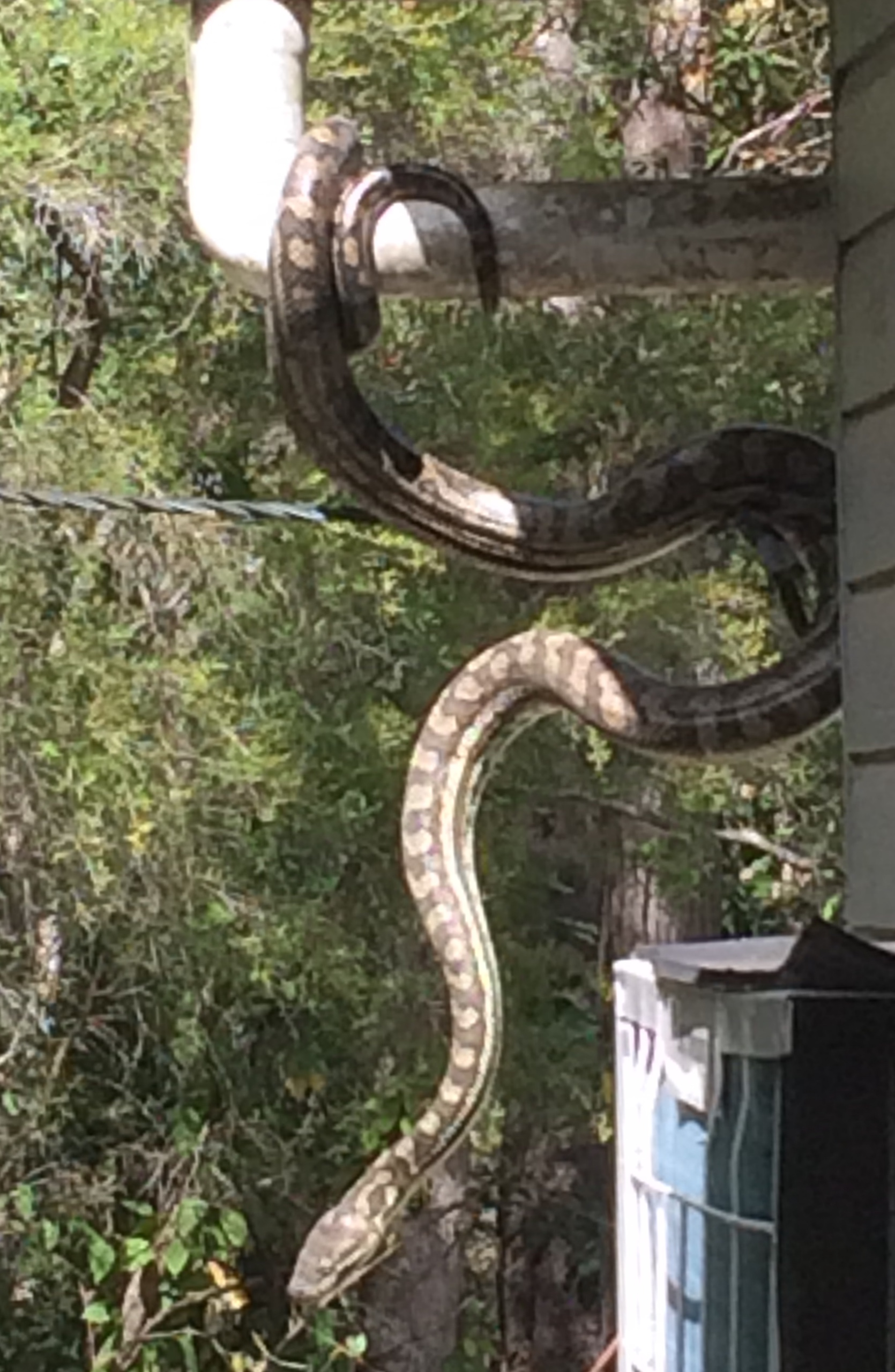
- Coastal carpet snake, Cooloolabin, 2020

- Interactive map of Cooloolabin
- Coordinates: 26.54°S 152.9011°E
- Country: Australia
- State: Queensland
- LGA: Sunshine Coast Region
- Location: 4.7 km (2.9 mi) W of Yandina; 13.3 km (8.3 mi) NNW of Nambour; 42.5 km (26.4 mi) NNW of Caloundra; 123 km (76 mi) N of Brisbane

Government
  - State electorate: Nicklin
  - Federal division: Fairfax

Area
  - Total: 32.6 km^{2} (12.6 sq mi)

Population
  - Total: 311 (2021 census)
  - Density: 9.540/km^{2} (24.71/sq mi)
- Time zone: UTC+10:00 (AEST)
- Postcode: 4560
Suburbs around Cooloolabin
Belli Park	Eerwah Vale	Bridges
Belli Park	Cooloolabin	Bridges
Gheerulla	Kiamba	Yandina

Cooloolabin is a rural locality in the Sunshine Coast Region, Queensland, Australia. In the 2021 census, Cooloolabin had a population of 311 people.

== Geography ==
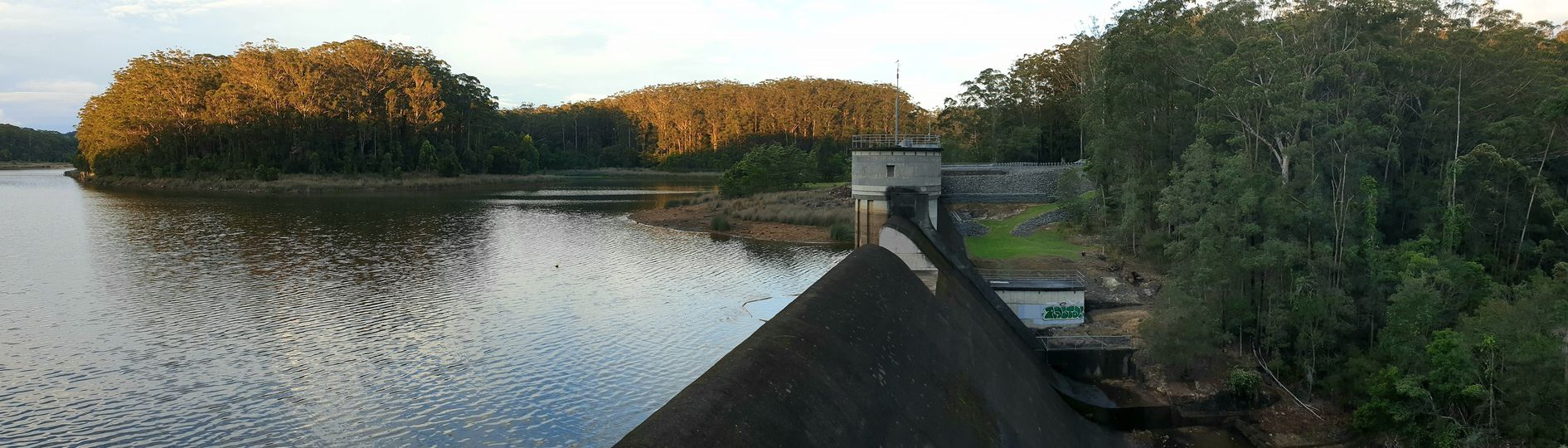
Cooloolabin Dam wall, 2021

Most of Cooloolabin is mountainous, densely forested and within the Mapleton National Park, including:

- Mount Bottle And Glass (26.5382°S 152.8998°E) 235 metres (771 ft)
- Swain Peak (26.5232°S 152.9062°E) 290 metres (950 ft)

Only two small valleys to the south are developed as rural residential areas, each around a dam reservoir:

The Cooloolabin Dam and the reservoir it impounds are in the south-west of the locality (26.54722°S 152.8803°E).

The northernmost part of Wappa Dam is in the south-east of Cooloolabin (26.5635°S 152.9202°E).

== History ==
Cooloolabin is an Aboriginal word meaning "place of koalas".

Cooloolabin Provisional School opened on 28 January 1915. It became Cooloolabin State School on 1 September 1916. It closed in 1962. The school was on a 2-acre (0.81 ha) site at the western end of Cooloolabin Road (approx 26.5552°S 152.8959°E).

== Demographics ==
In the 2016 census Cooloolabin had a population of 257 people.

In the 2021 census, Cooloolabin had a population of 311 people.

== Education ==
There are no schools in Cooloolabin. The nearest government primary school is Yandina State School in neighbouring Yandina to the east. The nearest government secondary school is Nambour State College in Nambour to the south-east.
