= Nambour Chronicle and North Coast Advertiser =

Former newspaper in Queensland, Australia

Front page of The Nambour Chronicle and North Coast Advertiser, Friday 22 December 1922.

The Nambour Chronicle and North Coast Advertiser was a newspaper published in Nambour, Queensland, Australia from 1903 to 1983.

== History ==
The first issue was published on 31 July 1903 in a small weatherboard building on the corner of Howard and Currie Streets in Nambour. Luke Wilkinson was both the proprietor and editor.

In 1980, the Chronicle was purchased by the owners of the Sunshine Coast Daily and production of the Chronicle ceased in 1983.

== Digitisation ==
Digitised editions of the Nambour Chronicle are available on NLA Trove from 22 December 1922 to 31 December 1954.
