= Yandina, Queensland =

Yandina
- Town
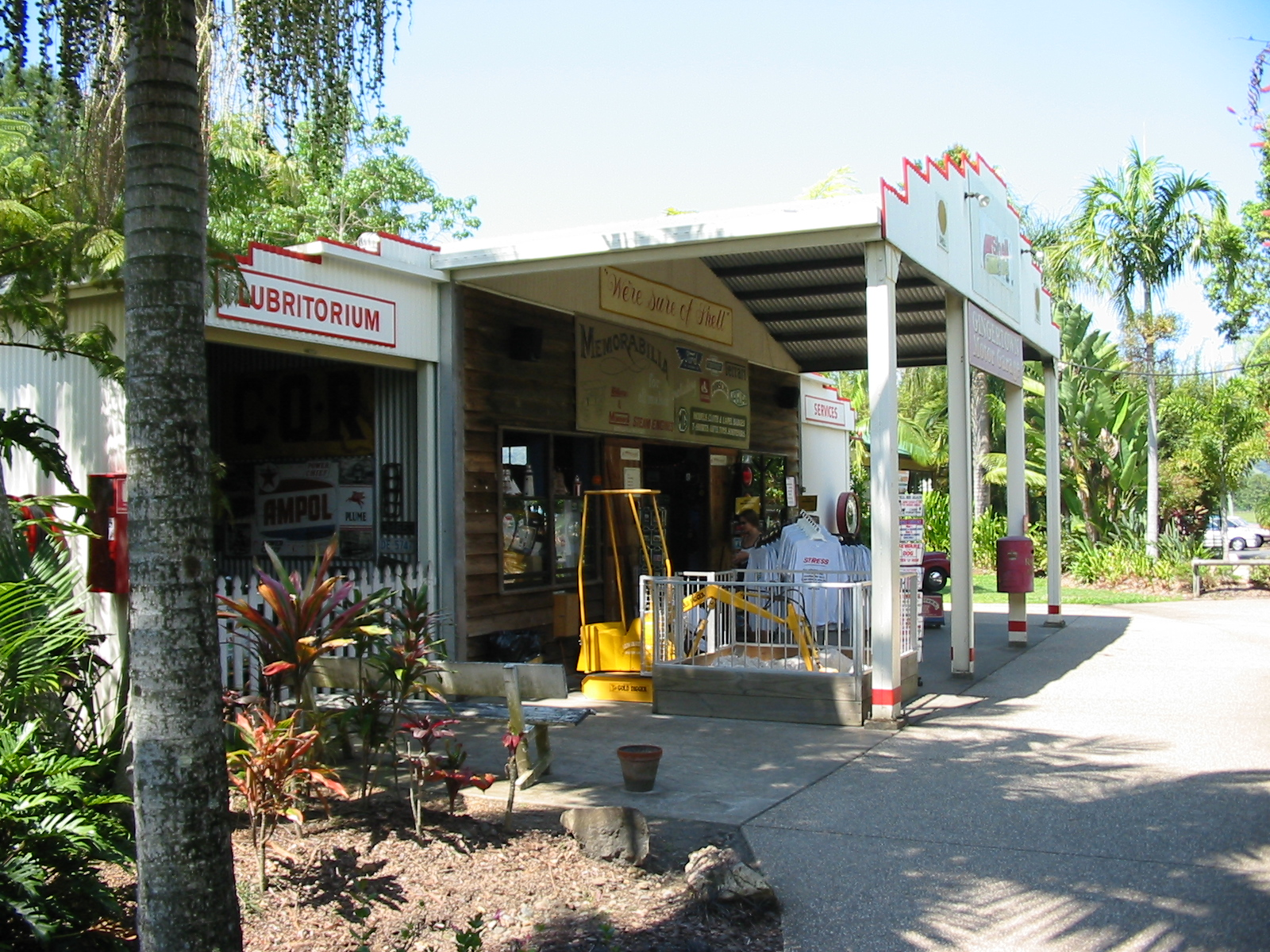
- Display at the Ginger Factory, 2003

- Interactive map of Yandina
- Coordinates: 26.5606°S 152.9563°E
- Country: Australia
- State: Queensland
- City: Sunshine Coast
- LGA: Sunshine Coast Region
- Location: 9.0 km (5.6 mi) N of Nambour; 21.9 km (13.6 mi) NW of Maroochydore; 28.2 km (17.5 mi) NNW of Caloundra; 110 km (68 mi) N of Brisbane
- Established: 1870

Government
  - State electorates: Nicklin; Ninderry
  - Federal division: Fairfax

Area
  - Total: 15.4 km^{2} (5.9 sq mi)

Population
  - Total: 3,073 (2021)
  - Density: 199.5/km^{2} (516.8/sq mi)
- Time zone: UTC+10:00 (AEST)
- Postcode: 4561
Localities around Yandina
Bridges	Bridges	Ninderry
Cooloolabin	Yandina	Maroochy River
Kiamba	Kulangoor	Parklands

Yandina (/jænˈdiːnə/) is a rural town and locality in the Sunshine Coast Region, Queensland, Australia. In the 2021 census, the locality of Yandina had a population of 3,073 people.

== Geography ==
Yandina is in the Sunshine Coast hinterland. The name originates from the Kabi language, "yan dhinang" meaning to "cross water by foot", marking the first upstream ford over the Maroochy River.

The Bruce Highway enters the locality from the south (Kulangoor / Parklands), bypasses the town of Yandina to the east, and exits the locality to the north (Bridges). The Yandina-Coolum Road and the Yandina-Bli Bli Road both exit to the east.

The North Coast railway line enters the locality from the south (Kulangoor), passes through the town which is served by the Yandina railway station (26.5610°S 152.9582°E), before exiting the locality to the north (Bridges).

== History ==
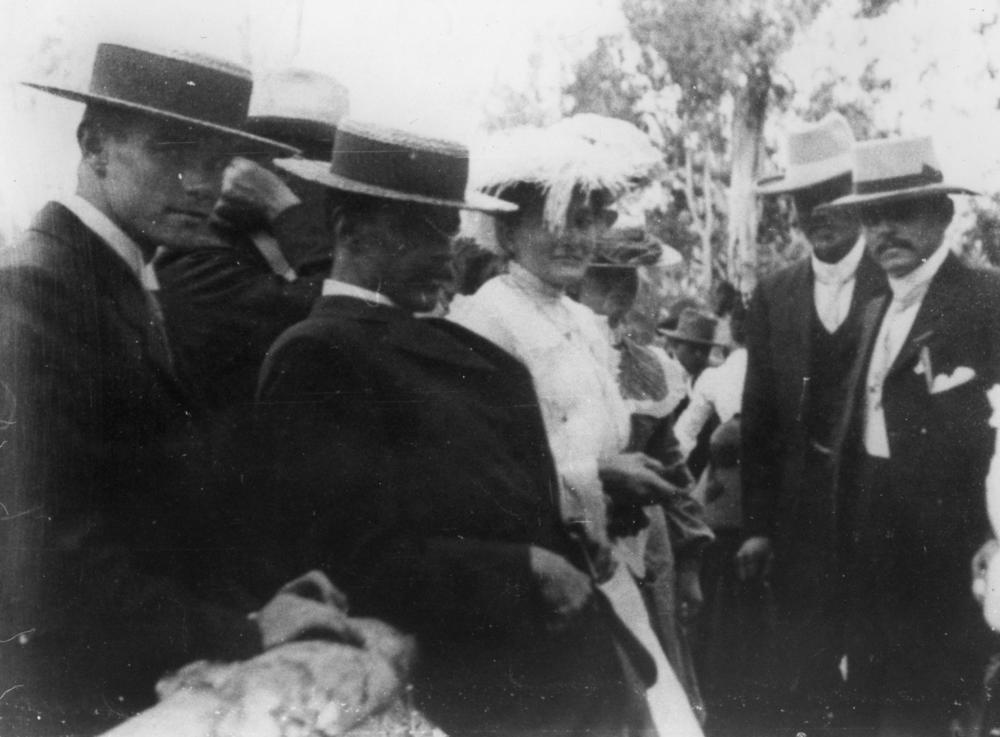
Patrons at Yandina race day, ca. 1905

=== Indigenous heritage ===
Aboriginal people have lived in the Yandina district for over 40,000 years. They belonged to the Gubbi Gubbi language group, which consisted of a number of tribes occupying traditional resource areas. Around Yandina, the Undandi tribal area was east of the present day railway line while the Nalbo area was west of the line. Legends, bora rings, pathways, grinding grooves, scarred trees and middens provide evidence of occupancy.

=== Daniel and Zachariah Skyring ===
British colonisation began in the 1850s with the arrival of Daniel and Zachariah Skyring who took up the large Crown Land pastoral leases of Yandina, Canando, Whildka Whildka and Pooreema for around £14 per annum. Their land acquisition stretched from the upper sections of the Maroochy River, north along Yandina Creek to Cooroy.

The Skyring brothers employed sawyers to cut the significant stands of cedar and hardwood trees on their leasehold, with much of the timber products being sold through the merchant business of their father Daniel Skyring senior in Brisbane.

The Skyrings also established several cattle stations on their properties around Yandina and Ninderry. They had a total area of 92,000 acres, capable of grazing around 2,000 cattle.

The famous Queensland colonist, Thomas Petrie, recorded two significant events of frontier colonial violence occurring on the Skyring leaseholds in the early 1860s. One of Petrie's Aboriginal employees, Puram, was shot dead by a cattle station worker while collecting shellfish on the Maroochy River near Nindery. Another of his Indigenous employees, Karal, survived a mass poisoning near the same place. A white fellow at the cattle station gave out flour laced with arsenic which Karal ate, but he later drank saltwater to make him vomit up the poisoned food and avoid death.

=== Township of Yandina ===
In the late 1860s, Yandina became a stopping point for prospectors travelling from Brisbane to the gold rush at Gympie. The town of Yandina was surveyed in 1870. It was the first town in the Maroochy district. Many of the original buildings and the heritage streetscape of Stevens Street have been preserved. The Anglican church, built initially as a community church and opened in 1880, is the oldest on the Sunshine Coast. It is part of the Anglican Diocese of Brisbane. The Yandina hotel dates back to 1889 and was relocated using rollers and a bullock team in 1891 when the railway came through town. In the same year, the post office was moved to the new railway station. Privately owned Koongalba homestead is on the National Heritage List and is one of several historic homes in town. Yandina was originally planned to be the centre of the shire

Yandina Baptist Church opened in 1921. The Baptist congregation had previously been using the Anglican church for their services. In January 1921 the Baptists purchased the former union church in Pomona to relocate it to Railway Street in Yandina. The opening ceremony was held on Wednesday 16 March 1921.

Yandina Provisional School opened on 14 November 1889. On 4 February 1902, it became Yandina State School. A preschool was added in 1974.

The early timber getters logged beech, cedar, bunya pine and flooded gum. The timber industry remained important until the 1970s when a shortage of timber forced the closure on the Yandina mill. The fertile land around Yandina has been used for beef and dairy cattle, fruit growing, sugar cane and ginger.

Yandina Presbyterian Church was officially opened on Saturday 30 November 1940.

Nambour & District Reds (or Nambour Reds) soccer club was established in 1974. In 1997 Nambour Reds merged with Yandina Eagles to create Nambour Yandina United.

The Buderim Ginger Factory in Yandina was opened in April 1980 and also operates as a tourist attraction.

The town was bypassed by the Bruce Highway July 1997.

Yandina Baptist Church celebrated its centenary in 2021.

Today, Yandina officially endures as the oldest continuously inhabited town on the Sunshine Coast.

== Demographics ==
In the 2011 census, the locality of Yandina had a population of 2,221 people.

In the 2016 census, the locality of Yandina had a population of 2,371 people.

In the 2021 census, the locality of Yandina had a population of 3,073 people.

== Heritage listings ==
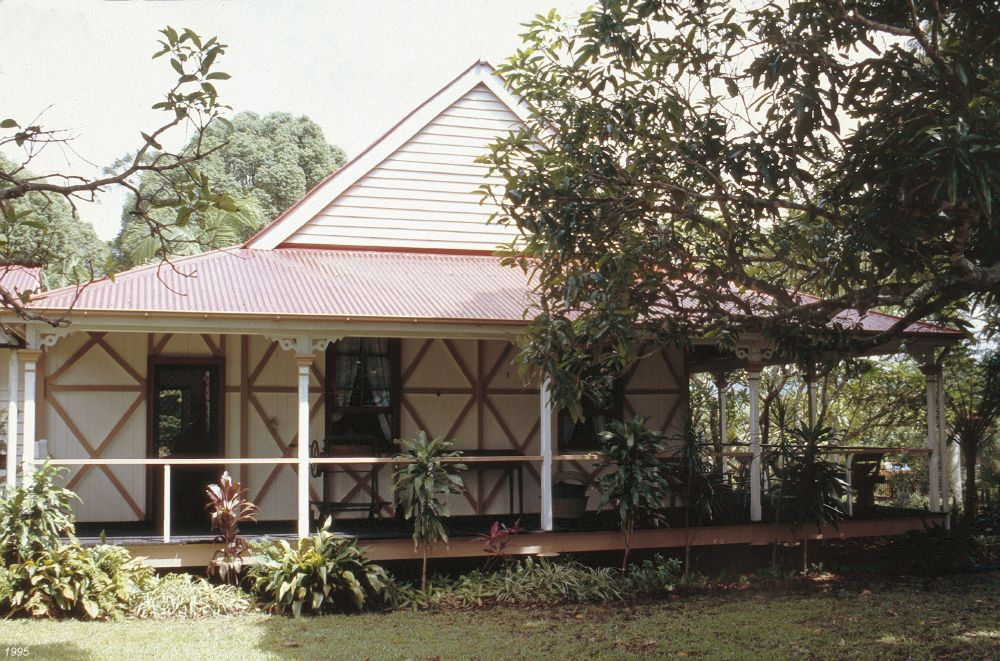
Koongalba, 1995

Yandina has a heritage-listed site:

- Koongalba, 12 Wharf Street (26.5681°S 152.9587°E)

== Education ==
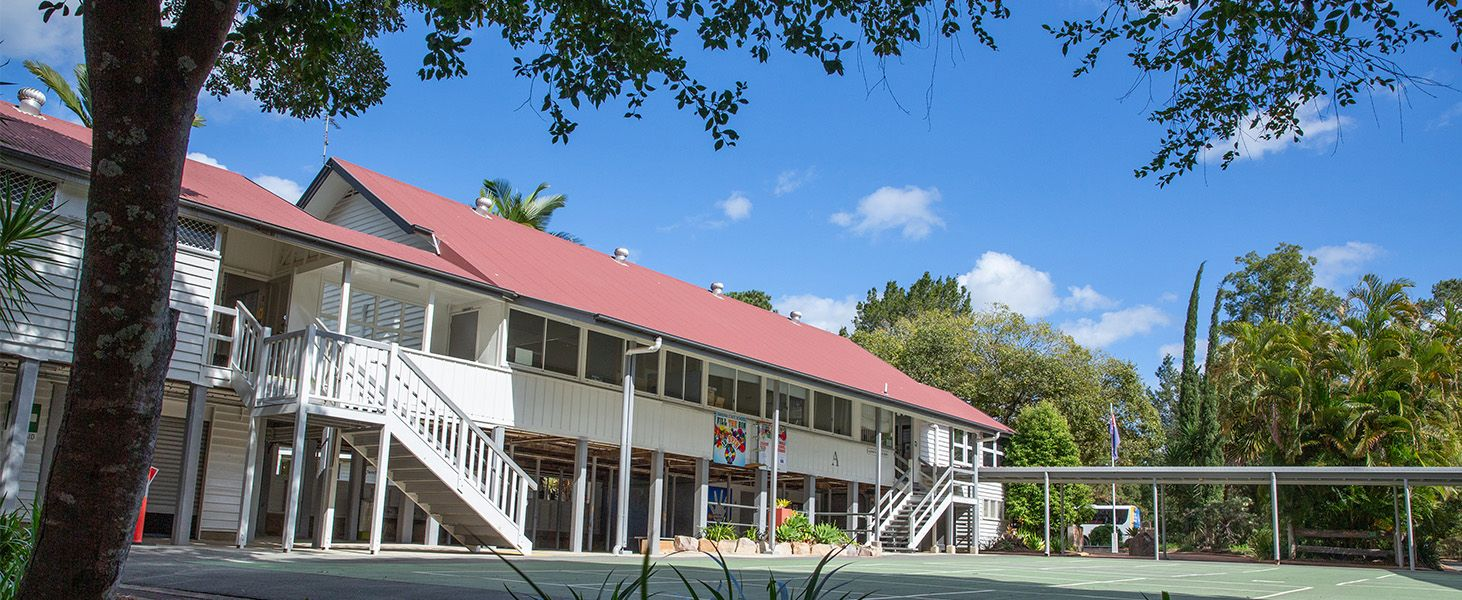
Yandina State School, 2022

Yandina State School is a government primary (Prep–6) school for boys and girls at 48 School Road (26.5522°S 152.9579°E). In 2018, the school had an enrolment of 289 students with 26 teachers (21 full-time equivalent) and 15 non-teaching staff (10 full-time equivalent). It includes a special education program.

There is no secondary school in Yandina. The nearest government secondary school in Nambour State College in Nambour to the south.

== Facilities ==
Maroochy River Fire Station is at 11 Branyandah Street (26.5594°S 152.9722°E).

Yandina Ambulance Station is at 2 Machinery Road (26.5564°S 152.9609°E).

There is a sewage treatment plant at 10 Focus Lane (26.5531°S 152.9670°E).

Yandina Cemetery is at 33 Cordwell Road (26.5720°S 152.9574°E).

== Amenities ==
The Sunshine Coast Council operates a mobile library service which visits Stevens Street.

The Yandina branch of the Queensland Country Women's Association meets at the Yandina Hall at 11 Stevens Street (26.5614°S 152.9569°E).

Yandina RSL Hall is at 24 North Street (26.5583°S 152.9539°E).

Wonga Park is a sportsground at 8 North Street (26.5580°S 152.9532°E). It is the home ground of Nambour Yandina United, an association football club affiliated with Sunshine Coast Football.

Yandina has a number of churches including:

- All Saints' Anglican Church at 3 Farrell Street (26.5619°S 152.9553°E)
- Yandina Baptist Church at 31 Low Street (corner of Railway Street, 26.5596°S 152.9572°E)
- Yandina Seventh-Day Adventist Church at 23 North Street (26.5588°S 152.9536°E)

== Attractions ==
Yandina is the home to the Buderim Ginger Factory (26.5556°S 152.9593°E) and Nutworks (26.5545°S 152.9615°E).

Yandina Historic House is a local history museum and visitor information centre at 3 Pioneer Road (26.5579°S 152.9595°E). It is leased from the Sunshine Coast Council and operated by the Yandina & District Historical Society.

== In popular culture ==
Peter Carey describes the Yandina of 1972 in his novel His Illegal Self.
