= Kulangoor, Queensland =

Kulangoor
- Suburb
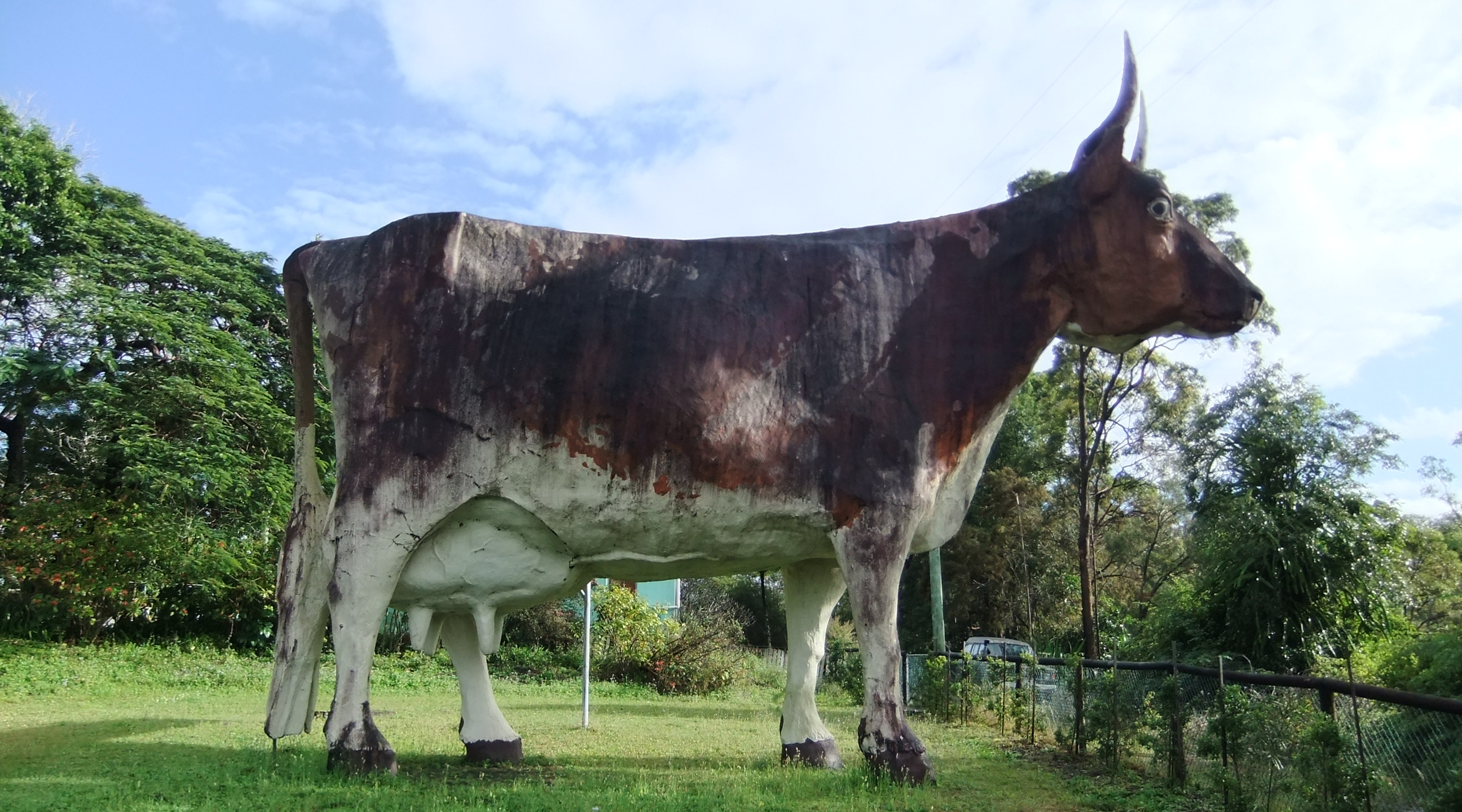
- The Big Cow, Kulangoor, 2013

- Interactive map of Kulangoor
- Coordinates: 26.59°S 152.9677°E
- Country: Australia
- State: Queensland
- LGA: Sunshine Coast Region
- Location: 3.1 km (1.9 mi) S of Yandina; 8.3 km (5.2 mi) N of Nambour; 34.9 km (21.7 mi) NNW of Caloundra; 115 km (71 mi) N of Brisbane

Government
  - State electorate: Nicklin
  - Federal division: Fairfax

Area
  - Total: 6.4 km^{2} (2.5 sq mi)

Population
  - Total: 455 (2021 census)
  - Density: 71.1/km^{2} (184.1/sq mi)
- Time zone: UTC+10:00 (AEST)
- Postcode: 4560
Suburbs around Kulangoor
Yandina	Yandina	Yandina
Kiamba	Kulangoor	Parklands
Image Flat	Image Flat	Parklands

Kulangoor is a rural locality in the Sunshine Coast Region, Queensland, Australia. It was known as the home of The Big Cow for many years. In the 2021 census, Kulangoor had a population of 455 people.

== Geography ==
The Bruce Highway forms the eastern boundary of the locality with the Nambour Connection Road running immediately parallel to it. The North Coast railway line traverses the locality from the south to the north.

The eastern part of the locality is in a valley (approx 30–40 metres above sea level) and this is the developed area of the locality, including small farms and rural residential use, all freehold. There is also the large Kulangoor lawn cemetery operated by the Sunshine Coast Regional Council at 31 - 89 Ackerman Road. The highway and rail also pass through this valley area.

The western part of the locality is mountainous and densely forested with Mount Wappa (200 metres about sea level) and Mount Combe (150 metres above sea level) and other unnamed peaks. Most of the north-western and western part of the locality is designated the Mapleton Conservation Park while the south-western area is the Wappa State Forest. In the south-east of the locality is the Ferntree Creek National Park.

== History ==
The locality takes its name Kulangoor from its railway station, which, in turn, was named on 11 April 1921 from the Kabi language word kalang meaning good.

== Demographics ==
In the 2016 census, Kulangoor had a population of 480 people.

In the 2021 census, Kulangoor had a population of 455 people.

== Education ==
There are no schools in Kulangoor. The nearest government primary schools are Yandina State School in neighbouring Yandina to the north and Nambour State College (junior school) in Nambour to the south. The nearest government secondary school is Nambour State College (senior school) in Nambour.

== The Big Cow ==
The Big Cow was built in the 1970s to attract tourists to a working dairy farm at 9-11 Ayrshire Rd. It is one of the many Australian Big Things. It was sculpted by Hugh Anderson, who also sculpted the Big Bulls in Rockhampton. The Big Cow is seven times the size of an Ayrshire cow on which it is modelled. It is made of concrete and described as "able to withstand a cyclone". After the dairy farm closed, the Big Cow remained on the property which was used for a variety of purposes. In March 2016, the Big Cow was described as "closed and fallen into disrepair". On 10 January 2020, the Big Cow was moved to the Highfields Pioneer Village complex near Toowoomba, where it was restored and officially reopened on 20 September 2020.
