= Australian Urban Design Awards =

Urban design awards program

- Awarded for: Design achievement, leadership, advocacy, strategy, policy and research in Urban Design
- Country: Australia
- Presented by: Planning Institute of Australia, Australian Institute of Architects and the Australian Institute of Landscape Architects
- First award: 2001; 25 years ago
- Website: urbandesignawards.com.au

The Australian Urban Design Awards are a national annual urban design awards program. The Award is presented by the Planning Institute of Australia, Australian Institute of Architects and the Australian Institute of Landscape Architects.

== Background ==
Established in 2001, it is the successor of Prime Minister Paul Keating's Urban Design Task Force Award that began in 1996.

The Awards are convened by the Planning Institute of Australia with the support of the following organisations: Australian Institute of Architects, Australian Institute of Landscape Architects, Green Building Council of Australia, Australian Sustainable Built Environment Council, Consult Australia, Engineers Australia, Urban Design Forum Australia and Government Architects Network Australia (GANA).

== Award categories ==
=== Built outcomes ===
This category recognises an outstanding work of city building that exemplifies an urban design project as a catalyst, improving what exists and anticipating and guiding what might come. Projects must be constructed and complete and able to demonstrate how they have improved place and resulted in broad public benefit. Awards are adjudicated in two scales:

- City and Regional Scale
- Local and Neighbourhood Scale

=== Strategic design and policy ===
This category recognises an outstanding work of strategic design or urban policy that may transform the performance of an urban place and improve the quality of life of the community. Projects can range in scale and scope, but all should be strategic, innovative, deliverable, and able to demonstrate how they will improve the qualities of place and result in broader public benefits. Awards are adjudicated in two scales:

- City and Regional Scale
- Local and Neighbourhood Scale

=== Research and advocacy ===
This category recognises outstanding work in urban design research or advocacy that has broad application and will improve urban quality of life in Australia. The research or advocacy must be published and publicly available, impartial and evidence-based, whilst also advancing knowledge and practice. Awards are adjudicated in two scales:

- City and Regional Scale
- Local and Neighbourhood Scale

=== Urban design champions ===
This category added in 2025 recognises individuals who have had a significant impact on urban design, innovation and performance of urban places, working to improve the quality of life of communities. Urban champions can come from a diverse range of sectors, including planning, architecture, landscape and urban design disciplines. They will have made an outstanding contribution to collaboration, knowledge, education, advocacy, project design and delivery. Possible candidates may be for example: political champion, community champion, journalist, public servant, urban activist, developer or urban practitioner.

==== Recipients ====
- 2025: Jeremy McLeod – Architect, Breathe and Nightingale Projects
- 2025: Chris Thomas – Design Manager, City of Sydney (posthumous)
- 2026: Michael Rayner AM — Architect and urban designer
- 2026: Rob McGauran AM — Architect and urban designer
- 2026: Shelley Penn AM — Architect, educator and urbanist

== Recipients ==
Australian Urban Design Awards since 2001
Year	Award category	Project	Location	Team
2001	Winner	Gosnells Town Centre Revitalisation	Gosnells, Western Australia	City of Gosnells
2002	Winner	Steampacket Place, Geelong Waterfront	Geelong, Victoria	City of Greater Geelong
2003	Winner	Cairns Esplanade	Cairns, Queensland	City of Cairns
2004	Winner	Melbourne Docklands	Melbourne, Victoria	VicUrban
2004	Public Domain Award	Victoria Park Urban Renewal	Sydney, New South Wales	Hassell, NSW Government Architects
2004	Heritage Waterfront Award	Walsh Bay Redevelopment	Sydney, New South Wales	Walsh Bay Partnership, HPA & PTW
2005	Winner	Places for People and Melbourne CBD and Pedestrian Traffic Study	Melbourne, Victoria	City of Melbourne, Gehl Architects
2005	Strategic Urban Design Award	NSW Coastal Urban Design Initiative	New South Wales	Urban Design Advisory Service et al.
2005	Public Domain Award	Point Fraser Stage 1	Perth, Western Australia	Syrinx Environmental, City of Perth
2005	Research and Publication Award	Fluid City: Transforming Melbourne's Urban Waterfront	Melbourne, Victoria	Kim Dovey
2006	Winner	Balaclava Walk and Community Housing	Melbourne, Victoria	City of Port Phillip, MGS Architects
2006	Winner	North Terrace Redevelopment	Adelaide, South Australia	City of Adelaide, Taylor Cullity Lethlean
2006	Education Award	My Neighbourhood	New South Wales	Landcom
2006	Public Domain Award	Sandridge Bridge Precinct Redevelopment	Melbourne, Victoria	Department of Sustainability & Environment, City of Melbourne
2007	Winner	Coastal Towns Design Framework	Victoria	Department of Sustainability & Environment et al.
2008	Winner	Bendigo City Centre: a journey of transformation and commitment to quality	Bendigo, Victoria	City of Greater Bendigo, Don Goldsworthy and Associates
2009	Winner	Paddington Reservoir Gardens	Sydney, New South Wales	City of Sydney
2009	Winner	Transforming Australian Cities	Victoria	Victorian Government and City of Melbourne
2010	Winner	Inner Northern Busway	Brisbane, Queensland	Queensland Department of Transport, BVN Architecture
2010	Winner	Geelong Youth Activities Precinct	Geelong, Victoria	City of Greater Geelong
2010	Winner	Beyond the Pavement: RTA urban design policy	New South Wales	Roads & Traffic Authority
2011	Winner	SW1 South Bank Urban Village	Brisbane, Queensland	South Bank Corporation, Cox Rayner Architects
2012	Winner: Delivered Large Scale	Darling Quarter	Sydney, New South Wales	Lendlease
2012	Winner: Delivered Small Scale	River Quay	Brisbane, Queensland	Arkhefield Architects and Cardno
2012	Winner: Policies, Programs and Concepts Large Scale	Parramatta River Urban Design Strategy	Sydney, New South Wales	McGregor Coxall
2012	Winner: Policies, Programs and Concepts Small Scale	Penrith of the Future	Sydney, New South Wales	Campement Urbain
2013	Winner: Delivered Large Scale	Northern Busway	Brisbane, Queensland	Tract Consultants et al.
2013	Winner: Delivered Small Scale	Sydney Laneway Upgrades	Sydney, New South Wales	ASPECT Studios, City of Sydney
2013	Winner: Policies, Programs and Concepts Large Scale	Linking Canberra City to the Lake	Canberra, ACT	ACT Office of the Coordinator General, Hill Thalis, et al.
2014	Winner: Delivered Large Scale	NewActon Precinct	Acton, Canberra	Molonglo Group, Fender Katsalidis Architects, Oculus
2014	Winner: Delivered Large Scale	Prince Alfred Park and Pool	Sydney, New South Wales	Neeson Murcutt Architects, Sue Barnsley Design, City of Sydney
2014	Winner: Delivered Small Scale	Fremantle Esplanade Youth Plaza	Fremantle, Western Australia	Convic, City of Fremantle
2014	Winner: Policies, Programs & Concepts Small Scale	The Goods Line	Sydney, New South Wales	Aspect Studios with Chrofi for the Sydney Harbour Foreshore Authority
2014	Winner: Sustained Contribution to Urban Design	Urban Voices – celebrating urban design in Australia		Bruce Echberg, Bill Chandler, John Byrne
2015	Winner: Delivered Large Scale	Brookfield Place	Perth, Western Australia	Hassell, Fitzpatrick + Partners and Brookfield
2015	Winner: Delivered Small Scale	Port Adelaide Renewal: Hart's Mill Surrounds	Port Adelaide, South Australia	Aspect Studios, Mulloway Studio and Renewal SA
2015	Winner: Policies, Programs and Concepts Large Scale	Home:LIFE Making Livable Affordable & Sustainable Housing Choices	Victoria	SJB Urban and RMIT University
2015	Winner: Policies, Programs and Concepts Large Scale	Sunshine Coast Light Rail: Shaping Our Future	Sunshine Coast, Queensland	Sunshine Coast Council and Hassell
2015	Winner: Policies, Programs & Concepts Small Scale	Victoria Quay Enabling Precinct Plans	Fremantle,Western Australia	CODA, Fremantle Ports, Allerding & Associates & Creating Communities
2016	Winner: Delivered Large Scale	Sydney Park Stormwater Re-Use Project	Sydney, New South Wales	Turf Design Studio and Environmental Partnership
2016	Winner: Delivered Small Scale	Bowen Place Crossing	ACT	Lahznimmo Architects and Spackman Mossop Michaels
2016	Winner: Delivered Small Scale	The Goods Line	Sydney, New South Wales	Aspect Studios, Sydney Harbour Foreshore Authority, CHROFI and Gartner Rose
2016	Winner: Policies, Programs and Concepts Large Scale	Turramurra Community Hub Masterplan	Sydney, New South Wales	CHROFI in association with Ku-ring-gai Council
2016	Winner: Policies, Programs and Concepts Large Scale	Green Square Town Centre	Sydney, New South Wales	City of Sydney
2016	Winner: Policies, Programs and Concepts Small Scale	WGV at White Gum Valley	White Gum Valley, Western Australia	CODA Studio, Urbis, LandCorp and Josh Byrne and Associates
2017	Winner: Delivered Large Scale	Tonsley Innovation District	Adelaide, South Australia	Oxigen, Woods Bagot, Tridente Architects, KBR, WSP and Renewal SA
2017	Winner: Delivered Small Scale	Orange Regional Museum	Orange, New South Wales	Crone
2017	Winner: Policies, Programs and Concepts Large Scale	Better Placed – An integrated design policy for the built environment of New South Wales	New South Wales	New South Wales Government Architect
2018	Winner: Built Projects – City and Regional Scale	Bendigo Hospital Project	Bendigo, Victoria	Silver Thomas Hanley with Bates Smart and Oculus
2018	Winner: Built Projects – Local and Neighbourhood Scale	Main Street, Barcaldine	Barcaldine, Queensland	M3 Architecture and Brian Hooper Architect (architects in association)
2018	Winner: Built Projects – Local and Neighbourhood Scale	South Sydney Hospital Site – Stage 1	Green Square, New South Wales	City of Sydney with Peter Stutchbury Architecture, Design5, JMD, Sprout, CAB, Fox Johnston, Jane Irwin Landscape Architecture and CHROFI
2018	Winner: Leadership, Advocacy and Research – City and Regional Scale	Central Melbourne Design Guide	Melbourne, Victoria	City of Melbourne
2018	Winner: Leadership, Advocacy and Research – City and Regional Scale	Level Crossing Removal Project Urban Design Framework	Melbourne, Victoria	Level Crossing Removal Authority
2019	Winner: Built Projects – City and Regional Scale	Howard Smith Wharves	Brisbane, Queensland	HSW Nominees, Urbis and Woods Bagot
2019	Winner: Built Projects – City and Regional Scale	Maitland Levee and Maitland Riverlink	Maitland, New South Wales	McGregor Coxall and CHROFI
2019	Winner: Built Projects – Local and Neighbourhood Scale	Ferrars Street Education and Community Precinct	Ferrars Street, Melbourne	Tract
2019	Winner: Built Projects – Local and Neighbourhood Scale	Flour Mill of Summer Hill	Summer Hill, New South Wales	Hassell
2019	Winner: Leadership, Advocacy and Research – City and Regional Scale	Building Height Standards Review	Hobart, Tasmania	Leigh Woolley Architect and Urban Design Consultant
2020	Winner: Built Projects – City and Regional Scale	Sydney Metro Northwest	Sydney, New South Wales	Hassell in collaboration with Turpin Crawford Studio and McGregor Westlake Architecture
2020	Winner: Built Projects – Local and Neighbourhood Scale	Darling Square, Sydney	Sydney, New South Wales	ASPECT Studios with Kengo Kuma and Associates
2020	Winner: Leadership, Advocacy and Research – City and Regional Scale	Eastern Regional Trails Strategy	Victoria	Fitzgerald Frisby Landscape Architecture
2020	Winner: Leadership, Advocacy and Research – Local and Neighbourhood Scale	ANU Acton Campus Master Plan and Design Guide	Victoria	Arup in collaboration with Urban Enquiry, Lovell Chen, Mantra Studios, Karen Wright Projects, John Wardle Architects and Turnberry Consulting
2020	Winner: Leadership, Advocacy and Research – Local and Neighbourhood Scale	Transforming Southbank Boulevard	Southbank, Victoria	City of Melbourne, City Design Studio
2021	Winner: Built Projects – City and Regional Scale	Goyder Square	Palmerston, Northern Territory	Hatch RobertsDay and Turf Design Studio with Electrolight
2021	Winner: Built Projects – Local and Neighbourhood Scale	Prahran Square	Prahran, Victoria	Lyons Architecture and Aspect Studios
2021	Winner: Built Projects – Local and Neighbourhood Scale	The Canopy Precinct	Lane Cove, New South Wales	Arcadia Landscape Architecture and Scott Carver Landscape Architecture
2021	Winner: Leadership, Advocacy and Research – City and Regional Scale	Darwin Civic and State Square Vision	Darwin, Northern Territory	TCL
2021	Winner: Advocacy and Research – Local and Neighbourhood Scale	QUT Campus to Country	Brisbane, Queensland	BVN Architecture
2022	Winner: Built Projects – City and Regional Scale	Level Crossing Removal Project	Melbourne, Victoria	Level Crossing Removal Authority
2022	Winner: Built Projects – Local and Neighbourhood Scale	Bendigo Kangan TAFE Redevelopment	Bendigo, Victoria	SBLA, Six Degrees Architects and Architectus
2022	Winner: Leadership, Advocacy and Research — City and Regional Scale	Delivering Best Practice Urban Design Through Planning	Canberra, ACT	ACT Government, Hodyl and Co, Andy Fergus, Adam's Urban, Oculus and Creative Environment Enterprises
2022	Winner: Leadership, Advocacy and Research — City and Regional Scale	Green Track for Parramatta Light Rail	Parramatta, New South Wales	Transport for New South Wales with Urban Planning and Management, School of Social Sciences, Western Sydney University
2022	Winner: Leadership, Advocacy and Research — Local and Neighbourhood Scale	Campsie Town Centre Masterplan	Campsie, New South Wales	City of Canterbury Bankstown
2023	No Awards			
2024	Winner: Built Projects – City and Regional Scale	George Street, Sydney	Sydney, New South Wales	City of Sydney
2024	Winner: Built Projects – Local and Neighbourhood Scale	Transforming Southbank Boulevard	Southbank, Victoria	City of Melbourne with Taylor Cullity Lethlean and Mike Hewson
2024	Winner: Leadership, Advocacy and Research — City and Regional Scale	The Greenline Project	Melbourne, Victoria	City of Melbourne with ASPECT Studios x Taylor Cullity Lethlean
2024	Winner: Leadership, Advocacy and Research — Local and Neighbourhood Scale	Quantifying quality	Ultimo, New South Wales	SJB and University of Technology Sydney
2025	Winner: Built Outcomes	Central Park Public Domain	Chippendale, New South Wales	Turf Design Studio with Jeppe Aagaard Andersen
2025	Winner: Built Outcomes	Mary's Place, Dalby	Dalby, Queensland	Blight Rayner Architecture in association with Wild Studio
2025	Winner: Built Outcomes	Rozelle Parklands	Rozelle, New South Wales	Transport for NSW Urban Design Team
2025	Winner: Research and Advocacy	Healthy Higher Density Living for Families with Children: An Advocacy, Planning and Design Guide	New South Wales	Centre for Population Health, Western Sydney Local Health District
2025	Winner: Strategic Design and Policy	Beyond A to B: Urban design policy, procedures and principles for public transport infrastructure projects	New South Wales	Transport for NSW Urban Design Team (Public Transport and Precincts)
2025	Winner: Strategic Design and Policy	Cockatoo Island Waremah Masterplan	Cockatoo Island, New South Wales	Tyrrell Studio in collaboration with Mott McDonald, Klok Advisory, Bangawarra, Left Bank and The Sydney Harbour Federation Trust
2025	Winner: Strategic Design and Policy	Martin Place Metro Precinct Urban Design Framework	Martin Place	Tzannes
2026	Winner: Built Outcomes	Balam Balam Place	15 Phoenix Street, Brunswick	Kennedy Nolan, Open Work and Finding Infinity
2026	Winner: Built Outcomes	Campbelltown Station Commuter Carpark	Campbelltown, New South Wales	Hill Thalis Architecture and Urban Projects
2026	Winner: Built Outcomes	St Kilda Pier Redevelopment	St Kilda, Victoria	Jackson Clements Burrows Architects, Site Office Landscape Architecture and AW Maritime
2026	Winner: Research and Advocacy	Safer Cities program	New South Wales	Transport for NSW
2026	Winner: Research and Advocacy	The Grassening	Port Kembla, New South Wales	“The Grassening” Team (Nicole Smede)
2026	Winner: Research and Advocacy	ULI Australia, Department of Transport and Planning (Victoria) Net Zero Imperative: Technical Assistance Panel (TAP) Street Trees as Essential Infrastructure	Victoria	The Urban Land Institute (ULI) Australia, and Department of Transport and Planning (Victoria)
2026	Winner: Strategic Design and Policy	Doomadgee Future Planning Project	Doomadgee, Queensland	Aboriginal Shire of Doomadgee, Circ Design, Meridian Urban
2026	Winner: Strategic Design and Policy	From Policy to Place: Vincent’s Co-Funded Framework for Town Centre Transformation	City of Vincent, Western Australia	City of Vincent and the local businesses of Vincent
2026	Winner: Strategic Design and Policy	NSW Housing Pattern Book	New South Wales	New South Wales Government Architect with the NSW DPHI Strategic Planning and Policy Team
