= Dovey (surname) =

Dovey is a surname. Notable people with the surname include:

- Alice Dovey (1884–1969), American actress
- Bill Dovey (1894–1969), Australian judge
- Ceridwen Dovey (born 1980), South African-Australian anthropologist
- Ethel Dovey (1882–1920), American stage actress and singer
- George Dovey (1862–1909), American baseball executive
- John Dovey (1865–?), American baseball executive
- Kim Dovey (21st century), Australian architectural critic
- Ray Dovey (1920–1974), English cricketer
