= Parklands, Queensland =

Parklands
- Suburb
- Interactive map of Parklands
- Coordinates: 26.5986°S 152.9677°E
- Country: Australia
- State: Queensland
- City: Nambour
- LGA: Sunshine Coast Region
- Location: 4.2 km (2.6 mi) NNE of Nambour; 32.4 km (20.1 mi) NNW of Caloundra; 104 km (65 mi) N of Brisbane

Government
  - State electorates: Nicklin; Ninderry
  - Federal division: Fairfax

Area
  - Total: 8.3 km^{2} (3.2 sq mi)

Population
  - Total: 198 (2021 census)
  - Density: 23.86/km^{2} (61.8/sq mi)
- Time zone: UTC+10:00 (AEST)
- Postcode: 4560
Suburbs around Parklands
Yandina	Maroochy River	Maroochy River
Kulangoor	Parklands	Bli Bli
Image Flat	Nambour	Bli Bli

Parklands is a mixed-use locality in the Sunshine Coast Region, Queensland, Australia. In the 2021 census, Parklands had a population of 198 people. Parklands is located adjacent to and north of the larger town of Nambour.

== Geography ==
The locality is bisected by the Bruce Highway, which enters from the south (Nambour / Bli Bli) and then proceeds towards the north-west to form part of the north-western boundary of the locality before exiting the locality to the north-west (Kulangoor / Yandina).

The locality's south-western boundary follows the North Coast railway line, entering from the south (Nambour) and exiting to the south-west (Image Flat / Kulangoor). No railway stations serve the locality of Parklands.

Most of the locality is within a protected area. The land east of the Bruce Highway is almost entirely within the Parklands Conservation Park except for a small area in the south-east of the locality which is within the Parklands State Forest.

West of the highway, the land use includes a section of the Ferntree Creek National Park, the Nambour Golf Course, a small area of housing, a mix of rural residential and smaller suburban blocks, and two quarries.

== Demographics ==
In the 2016 census, Parklands had a population of 225 people.

In the 2021 census, Parklands had a population of 198 people.

== Education ==
There are no schools in Parklands. The nearest government primary schools are the junior campus of Nambour State College in neighbouring Nambour to the south and Yandina State School in neighbouring Yandina to the north-west. The nearest government secondary school is the senior campus of Nambour State College, also in Nambour. There are also non-government schools in Nambour and its suburbs.

== Amenities ==
The Sunshine Coast Regional Council operates a mobile library service which visits Village Way.

A large section of bushland in eastern Parklands, called the Parklands Conservation Park, has been set aside for recreational use and is very popular for mountainbiking, with a number of defined and marked trails. 15 km of tracks are open to the public during daylight hours. Camping is not permitted in the park.
