= Dovey =

Dovey may refer to:

- Dovey (surname), a surname
- River Dovey, a river in Wales that forms the border between the counties of Merionethshire and Cardiganshire, United Kingdom
- Dovey Johnson Roundtree (1914-2018), American lawyer
