= Tim Dwyer =

Tim Dwyer may refer to:

- Tim Dwyer (rugby league), Australian rugby league footballer
- Tim Dwyer (basketball), American basketball player and coach
