= Mark Jamieson =

Mark Jamieson may refer to:

- Mark Jamieson (cyclist)
- Mark Jamieson (politician)
