= The Commanding Officer =

1915 film by Allan Dwan

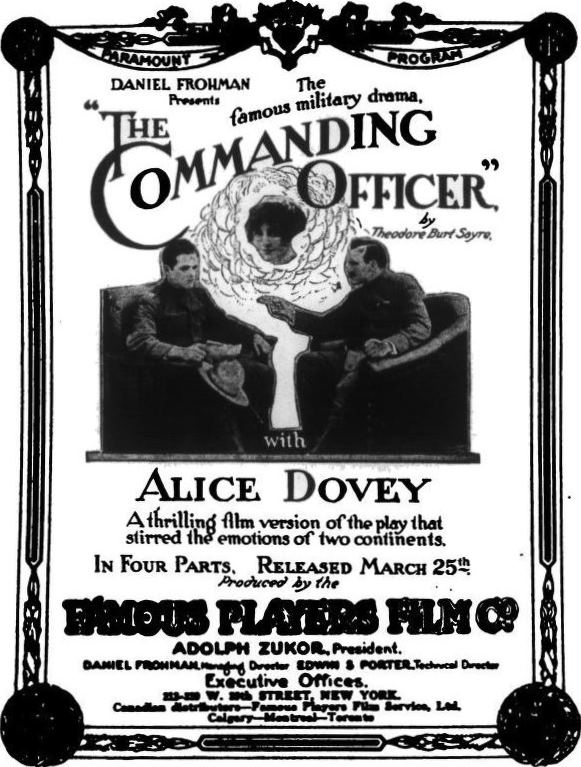
- Advertisement
- Directed by: Allan Dwan
- Based on: The Commanding Officer by Theodore Burt
- Produced by: Daniel Frohman
- Starring: Alice Dovey; Donald Crisp; Marshall Neilan; Douglas Gerrard; Ethel Phillips; Russell Bassett; Bob Emmons
- Production company: Famous Players Film Company
- Distributed by: Paramount Pictures
- Release date: March 25, 1915
- Running time: 4 reels
- Country: United States
- Language: Silent (English intertitles)

The Commanding Officer is a 1915 American silent drama film directed by Allan Dwan that was based upon a play by Theodore Burt. The film stars Alice Dovey, Donald Crisp, Marshall Neilan, Douglas Gerrard, Ethel Phillips, Russell Bassett, and Bob Emmons. The film was released on March 25, 1915, by Paramount Pictures.

== Plot ==
When Colonel Archer does not want to lend money to Captain Waring, he borrows that amount from Brent Lindsay in the village in exchange for his promissory note. Both Waring and Lindsay court Floyd Bingham, a retired colonel's daughter. Floyd discovers that Lindsay is dating the dancer Queen. On the advice of her father, she accepts Archer's marriage proposal, who has to take care of the two children of his dead sister. When Lindsay continues to harass Floyd, Archer gets into a fight with her. Floyd and Lindsay then go for a walk in the woods. They kiss and Waring takes a picture of them, which he uses to blackmail Lindsay. When Lindsay is later found dead, Archer is arrested. The villagers want to see it hanging. However, Queen witnessed the murder and clears his name just in time.

== Cast ==
- Alice Dovey as Floyd Bingham
- Donald Crisp as Col. Archer
- Marshall Neilan as Capt. Waring
- Douglas Gerrard as Brent Lindsay
- Ethel Phillips as The Queen
- Russell Bassett as Col. Bingham
- Bob Emmons as The Sheriff
- Jack Pickford as The Commandant's Orderly
- Francis Carpenter as The Boy
- Olive Johnson as The Girl
