= Rosanna Natoli =

Australian television presenter and politician

Mayor Rosanna Natoli

Mayor of the Sunshine Coast
- Incumbent
- Assumed office 16 March 2024
- Preceded by: Mark Jamieson

Personal details
- Born: Bundaberg, Queensland, Australia
- Party: Independent
- Spouse: Joe Natoli (m. 1989)
- Children: 3
- Education: University of Queensland; Queensland University of Technology
- Occupation: Politician; Former television presenter
- Website: rosannanatoli.com.au

Rosanna Natoli is an Australian politician and former television presenter. She has served as the mayor of the Sunshine Coast since 2024.

== Early life ==
Natoli was born in Bundaberg, but grew up in Brisbane. Some of her early employment experience includes working at clothing retailer Best & Less and the Sheraton Hotel.

She graduated from the University of Queensland with a Bachelor of Science majoring in psychology before receiving a Graduate Diploma in Communication – Journalism from the Queensland University of Technology.

== Media career ==
=== Journalism ===
Natoli was a presenter for the Seven Network's regional network, Seven Queensland.

Natoli commenced working for the network as a journalist, initially based in Bundaberg and then Maryborough before relocating to the Sunshine Coast where she has lived ever since.

Although based on the Sunshine Coast, Natoli was seen throughout the state reading local Seven News updates for the various geographical areas of Queensland while also filling in for weather forecaster Livio Regano on the main 6pm bulletin in each market.

Natoli was also a journalism lecturer at the University of the Sunshine Coast. She took leave from both positions in the lead up to the 2024 local elections. After being declared the new mayor of the Sunshine Coast, Natoli officially resigned from both positions.

=== Fake or Fortune? ===
In 2017, Natoli and her husband Joe Natoli appeared on the BBC's Fake or Fortune? which investigated the authenticity of a Tom Roberts oil painting, entitled Rejected, which the Natoli's had purchased from an English auction website in 2013. The Natoli's initially believed the work to be genuine and had it estimated prior to auction at $30,000 before a Tom Roberts expert cast doubt on its authenticity. Thinking it was worthless, Natoli stored the painting in a cupboard until a friend suggested approaching Fake or Fortune? At the conclusion of their investigation, art historian Mary Eagle concluded the work to be genuine.

== Political career ==
In December 2023, Natoli announced she would contest the 2024 Queensland local government elections as a mayoral candidate for the Sunshine Coast Regional Council, vying to be the successor of Mark Jamieson who had announced he would not be recontesting the position.

Natoli achieved 27% of the primary vote, defeating her nearest rival Ashley Robinson on 24% and was subsequently elected as the new mayor of the Sunshine Coast Region.

Her election resulted in Natoli becoming the first woman to be elected mayor of the Sunshine Coast Regional Council.

== Personal life ==
Natoli married her husband Joe Natoli in 1989, and has three children. Her husband is a councillor on the Sunshine Coast Regional Council, the same council which she now leads. This has led to some concerns around potential conflicts of interest, which both Natoli and her husband dismissed. In 2004, her husband became the final person to be elected as mayor of the Maroochy Shire Council prior to the council being merged into the new larger Sunshine Coast Regional Council which was formed as a result of the 2008 Queensland council amalgamations. Although he attempted to be elected as inaugural mayor of the new council, he was defeated by former Noosa Shire mayor Bob Abbot.

Natoli has an interest in performing, beginning when she played the lead role in a school musical. In 2017, she played the Wicked Witch in a stage production of The Wizard of Oz.

In March 2022, Natoli was ranked at #64 in the list of Sunshine Coast's 100 most inspirational women, compiled by the Sunshine Coast Daily.

In August 2022, Natoli was injured when she slipped and fell just prior to her taking to the stage to MC the Victory in the Pacific ball on the Sunshine Coast. She was treated by paramedics at the scene before being transported to hospital where she underwent surgery for a break in her forearm.
