= Ethel Dovey =

American actress and singer

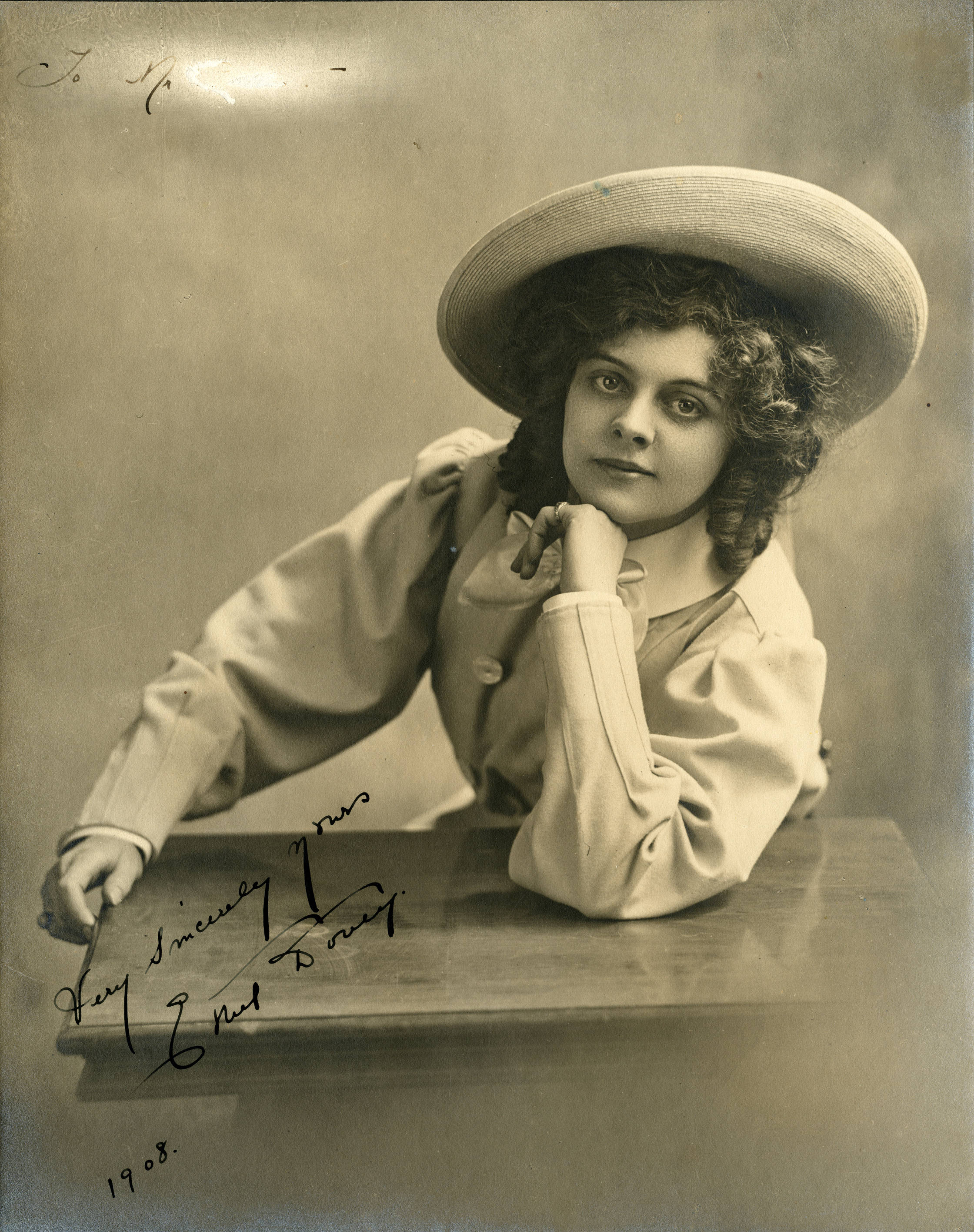
- Dovey photographed in 1908
- Born: Ethel Dovey; January 12, 1882
- Died: November 20, 1920 (aged 38); Des Moines, Iowa
- Occupations: Singer, Actress
- Years active: 1895–1912
- Spouses: Fred C. Truesdell (m. 1909) Willis M. Palmer (m. 1918; death 1920)
- Relatives: Alice Dovey (sister); William Kennish (great-grandfather)

Ethel Dovey (January 12, 1882 – November 20, 1920) was an American singer and stage actress. Dovey was born into a large family and had two brothers and four sisters, one of which was Alice Dovey who she spent most of her childhood with training to be a singer. Her talent for dramatics was spotted at an early age and her maternal grandfather insisted that she and her sister be trained under the best teachers. For their talent to be realized, the sisters lived in London for part of their childhood, occasionally returning to America to visit family.

As an adult, she enrolled at the Chicago Musical College and graduated in 1901 with a Joseph Jefferson award for dramatic art. She would frequently visit Nebraska City in Nebraska to perform in concerts and during the period 1902–1912, was recognized as a musical stage star. In 1908, she performed in the theater production The District Leader, where she met her future husband, Fred Truesdell, who she eloped with to marry in February 1909. She had two daughters to Truesdell and later married Willis M. Palmer.

Due to poor health, she retired from the stage in 1912 and spent time traveling before her death at home in Des Moines, Iowa on November 20, 1920.

== Early life ==
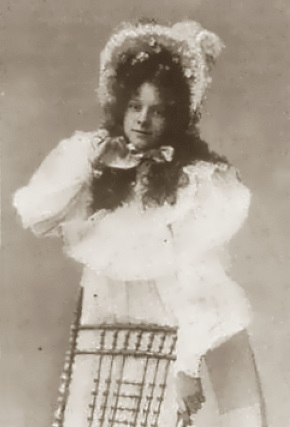
Ethel Dovey published in a January 1898 edition of "The Sketch"

Dovey was born on January 12, 1882, in Plattsmouth, Nebraska as the eldest child to parents Margaret Dovey and George E Dovey. Her childhood days and early education were spent in the city, where the "unusual dramatic talent" that she would later become famous for was first noticed. In order to fully realize her talent, Dovey and her younger sister Alice were sent abroad to sing and were known as the "Nebraska sisters". They lived in London for several years with their grandmother while studying voice and languages at Madame Cellini's School of Music. While there, she was "flabbergasted" at coming face to face with "real dukes and "real princes", as well as a poet who attended one of her grandmother's receptions, which she thought was "marvelous". She and her sister, who were considered to be precocious, were permitted to enter the reception room for a brief period of time.

== Education ==
Ethel and her sister's musical education began sometime around 1890, studying with Miss Lillian Terry for around four years before traveling to England in 1894, where they were favorably received by critics who "predicted a bright future" for them. In March 1895, under the care of Lillian Terry, they sang at a Royal bazaar at Cannon Street Hotel to an audience including the Duchess of Fife and the Ambassador to the United States. At this time, Henry Neville expressed a hope and belief that the sisters would go on to become actresses.

She and her sister returned on a home visit from London around September 1895 and on October 16, sang at a concert held at the Finke Opera House, where they were praised for their "phenomenal method and correctness, their seriousness and their strangeness". By this time, they were already regarded as being "singing prodigies". Ethel and her sister returned to England in 1896 and around early 1898, gave a concert at the Steinway Hall in London. Around 1898, Ethel took the stage name of Marie Louise Nebriska. Alongside her sister, she performed at The Crystal Palace in August 1899, singing "with great success". Ellen Terry was "among their warmest admirers". They had an admiration of the work of William Shakespeare, which originated from their maternal grandfather Charles Dawson, who insisted they be "put under the best teachers" from a young age.

Upon returning to America, Ethel enrolled at the Chicago Musical College, where she later graduated in 1901 and was awarded the Joseph Jefferson diamond medal for dramatic art as her ceremony. Following her graduation, she and her sister Alice joined The Strollers, a successful music comedy in 1902 which earned them recognition and success in follow-up seasons; they went on to feature at leading musical attractions in other major cities. Her musical education was completed in Paris, rather than London, owing to the death of her grandmother.

== Career ==
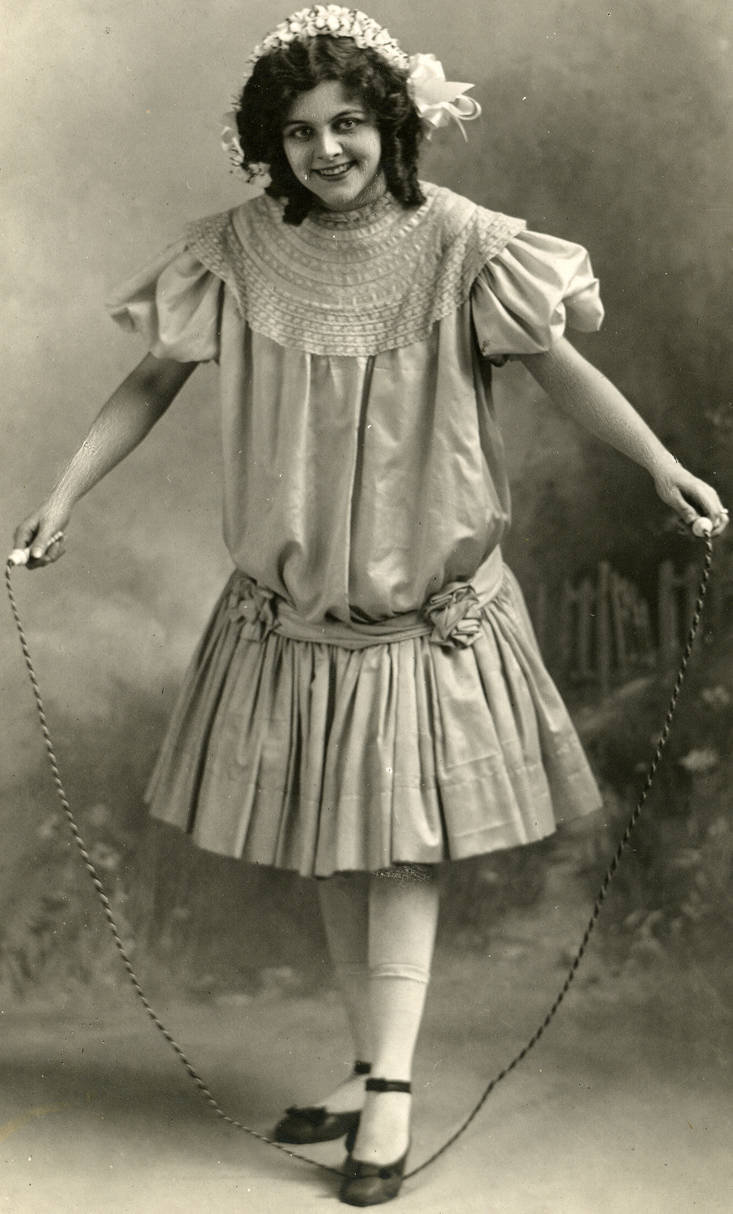
Dovey pictured in 1908

During her early career, Dovey was a frequent visitor to Nebraska City and performed in various concerts in the city. She was noted and recognized as a musical stage star during the period 1902 to 1912, winning high honors through the beauty of her singing voice "that has charmed thousands both in her native land and abroad". Dovey would often perform alongside her younger sister Alice, however in June 1906, performed in the same event for the first time as her other younger sister Margaret, who played the piano.

In May 1908, she was described as being "pretty and graceful" and was praised for her role in a theater production of "The District Leader". In the production, where she appeared alongside actor Fred Truesdell, she was considered as being "one of the cleverest comediennes that has ever appeared in Butte", having made a favorable impression to the audience.

Ill health forced her retirement from stage in 1912, where she spent time traveling in hope of improving her health, spending some time with her parents.

== Personal ==
Dovey had four sisters and two brothers, of which one sister was stage star Alice Dovey. She was the niece of the National League of Baseball president and the great-granddaughter of William Kennish, author and poet.

She married Fred Truesdell on February 6, 1909, at Oakland, California, who at the time was a popular leading man on stage. Their marriage announcement was a surprise to Dovey's many friends, who all joined in extending their best wishes. The couple met each other when performing with the "Stubborn Cinderella" company and had shortly decided upon an immediate marriage, but kept it a secret until the season concluded. She was married by Judge Graham and the news was only announced once the bridesmaid, who was a witness to the ceremony, was unable to keep the secret any longer. There had been "considerable" opposition when they became a couple.

She had two daughters to Truesdell, Jane Margaret (b. c1910) and Betty Ann (b. c1913). She later married Willis M. Palmer in 1918.

She died in her home in Des Moines, Iowa on November 20, 1920, and was survived by her father, siblings, husband and two daughters. The funeral was held on November 30, 1920, in Plattsmouth.
