= Ayrshire cattle =

Breed of cattle

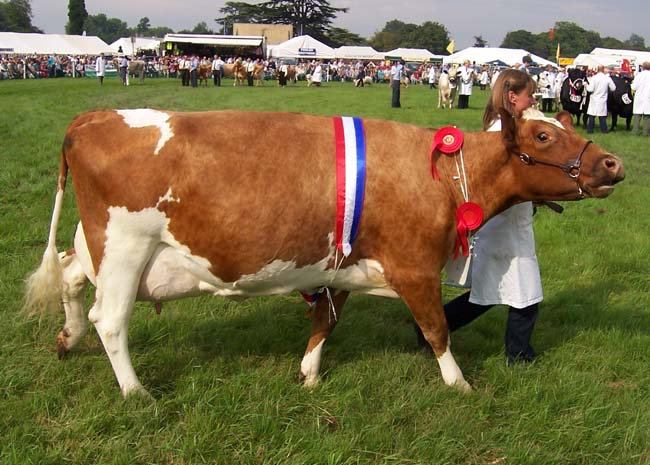
- A mature Ayrshire cow
- Country of origin: Scotland
- Distribution: Worldwide
- Use: Dairy

Traits
- Coat: Red and white
- Horn status: Horned, normally removed
- Cattle; Bos (primigenius) taurus

The Ayrshire (IPA /ˈɛərʃər/) is a Scottish breed of dairy cattle. It originates in, and is named for, the county of Ayrshire in south-western Scotland. Ayrshires typically have red and white markings; the red can range from a shade of orange to a dark brown.

== History ==
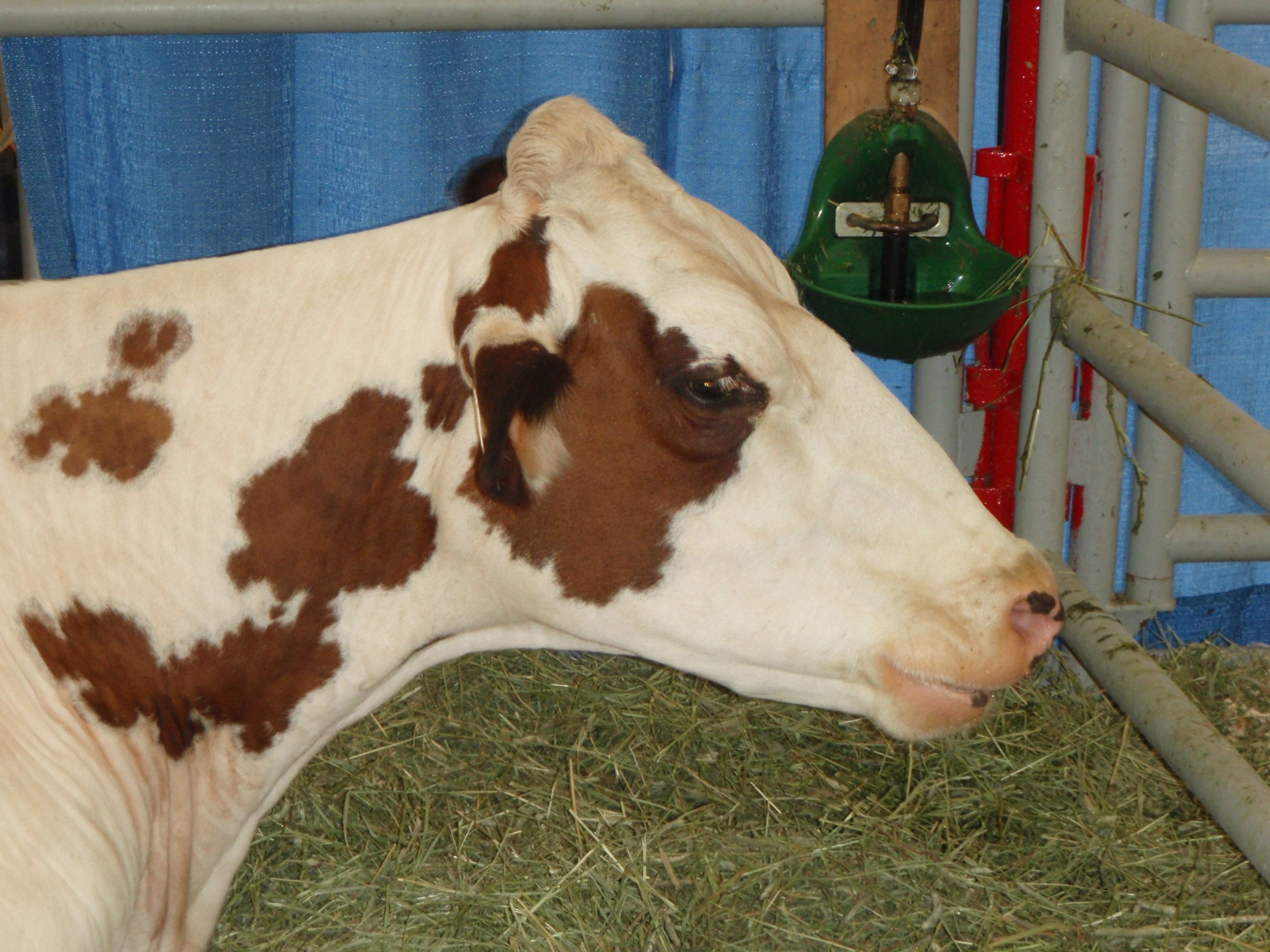
The head of an Ayrshire cow

The origins of the Ayrshire are not known. It originated in the county of Ayrshire in Scotland before 1800. It was variously known as the Dunlop, later the Cunningham, and finally, the Ayrshire. These are all parts of the County Ayr. Although they are now native to Ayrshire, Scotland, some historians believe the Ayrshire breed originated in Holland. In 1750, they were crossbred with other breeds of cattle, which led to their distinctive brown spots. The cattle were recognised as a distinct breed by the Highland and Agricultural Society in 1814. The Ayrshire Cattle Society, which promotes the breed, cites their longevity, hardiness, and easy calving as reasons for dairy farmers to consider raising them. These traits are thought to have developed due to the rugged conditions of its native habitat.

The Ayrshire was exported to the United States from 1822, primarily to Connecticut and other parts of New England. The environment was similar to their native land of Scotland. The American Ayrshire Breed Association was founded in 1875. One of their efforts was an "Approved Ayrshire Milk program" which marketed milk from farmers with pure Ayrshire herds as healthier and with a better flavor. It started in the late 1930s, but eventually ended.

== Characteristics ==
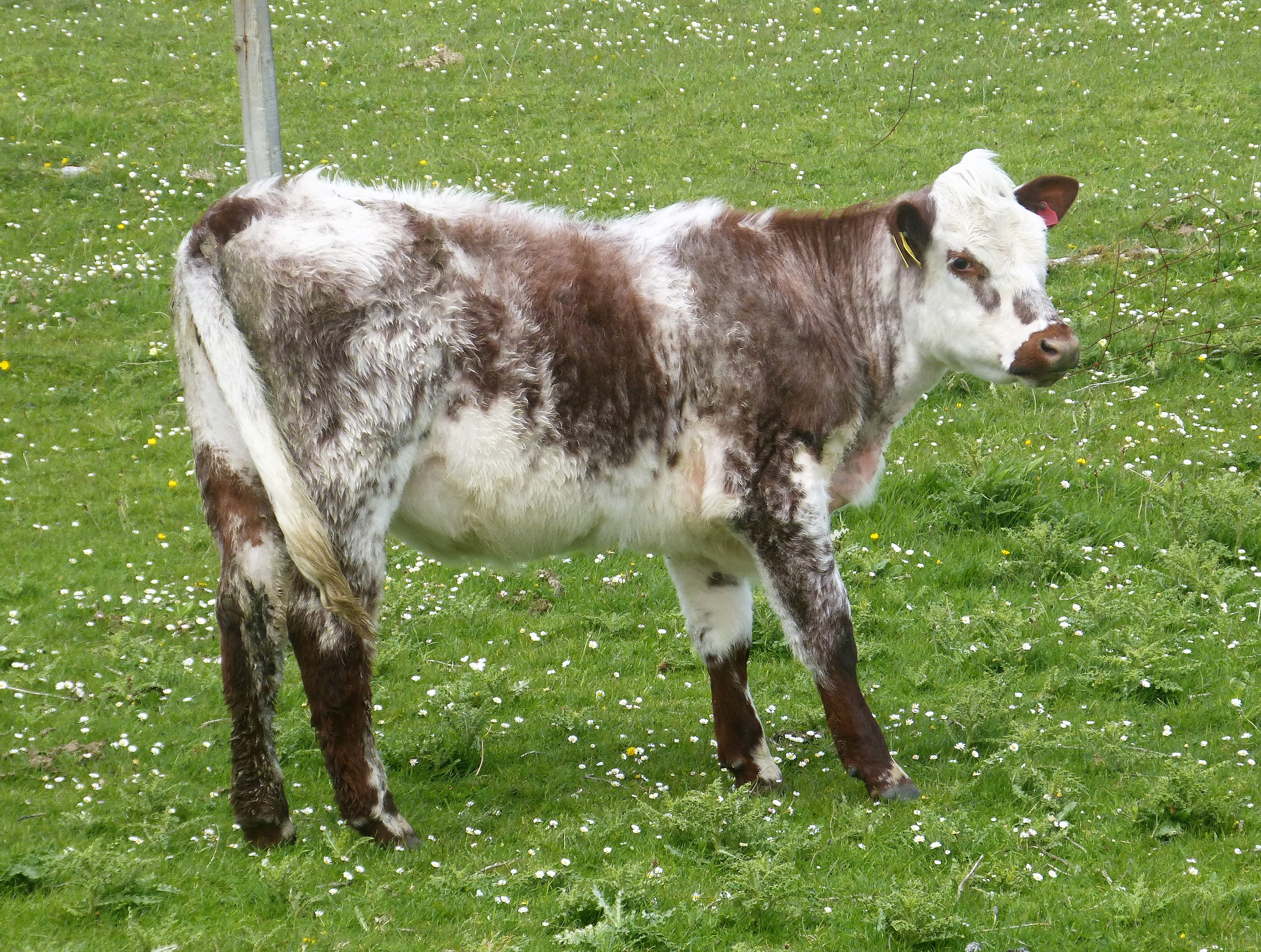
A heifer in Scotland, 2022

The Ayrshire is a medium-sized breed. The average adult individual weighs around 1,200 lb (540 kg) at maturity. On average, an Ayrshire cow can produce 12,000 pounds of milk per year; top-producing cows can milk production can reach 20,000 lb (9,100 kg) or greater per annum.

The cattle are usually red and white in colour, the red varying from very deep to a lighter shade. Their large and curved horns were once a hallmark of the breed, and can grow to 30 cm (12 in) in length. In contemporary agriculture, however, the vast majority are de-horned as calves for easier handling. The cattle are typically independent and adaptable, and are suited to extensive farming where grassy land is cheap and the farmer lets the cattle roam without micromanaging them and their food intake as much. (By contrast, Holstein-Friesians are often raised in intensive farming with barns, total mixed rations and silage provided by farmers over winter, and the like).

=== Temperament ===
A study of the social behaviour of Polish Black-and-White dairy cattle and their F1-crossbreds with Ayrshire, Jersey, Holstein-Friesian and Swedish Black-and-White breeds, found the Ayrshire crossbreeds were most dominant, least attacked by their group-mates and least susceptible to a group change. A further study found that among Ayrshire, Holstein, Jersey, Brown Swiss, and Guernsey (the other common dairy breeds), the Ayrshire had the highest number of agonistic interactions (fighting / hostility).

== Population ==
In 2008, 63,356 Ayrshire cattle were registered in the United Kingdom.

In the United States, the breed has been on a steady decline since the 1970s due to competition from Holsteins, who are specialized for dairy production and can out-produce Ayrshires. The Ayrshire's independence and adaptability to rough conditions is no longer as prized. They were an estimated 28,000 Ayrshires in the United States in 2001, or about 0.3% of the overall American dairy cattle population. The breed has proven more popular in Canada, where the way dairy producers are paid rewards the high-fat milk of the Ayrshire. Canadian Ayrshires are also rather distant from Scottish prototype Ayrshires. They were the second most popular dairy breed in Canada in 2001, behind the Holstein.

== In culture ==
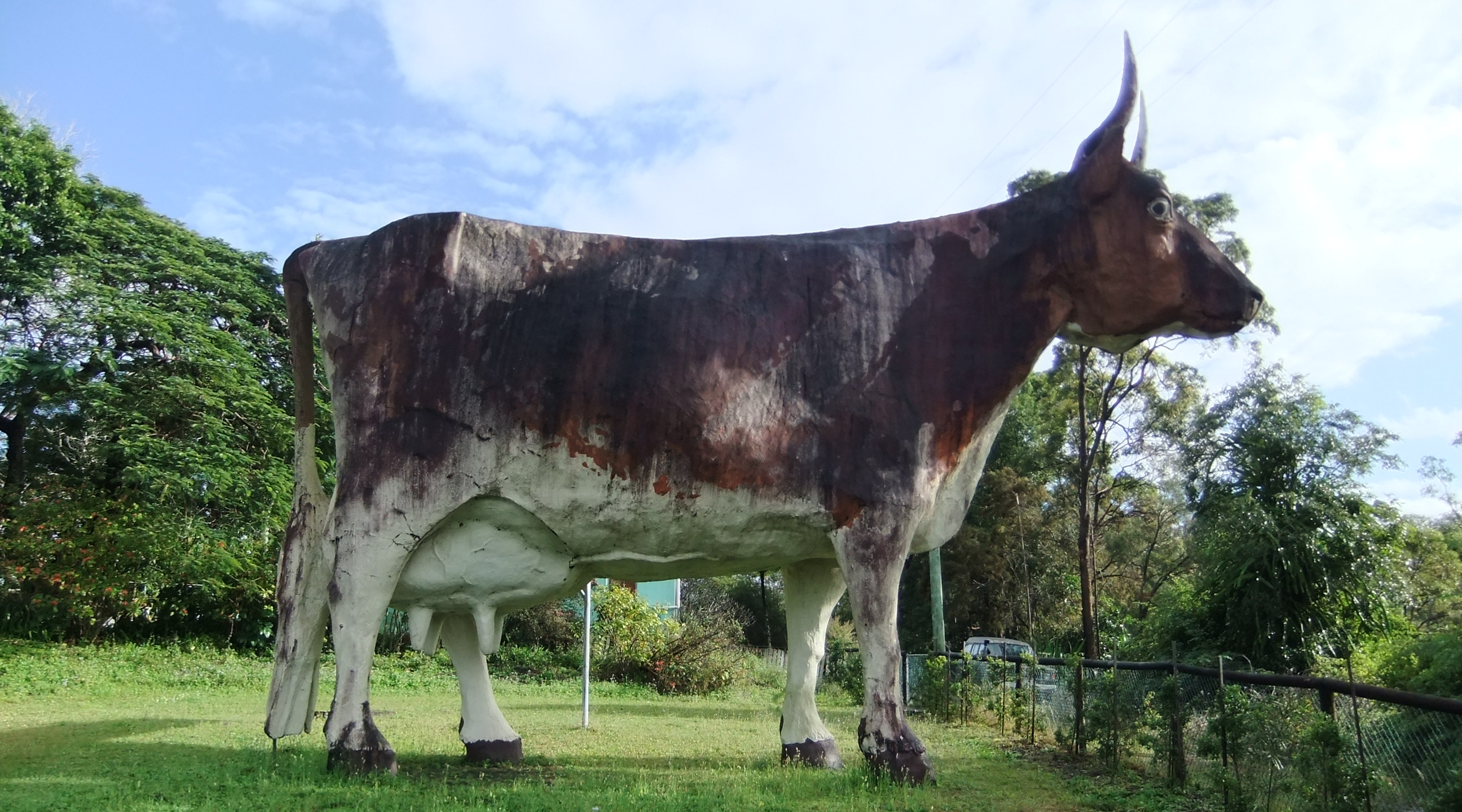
The Big Cow at its former home in Kulangoor in 2013

Highfields, Queensland is the home of the "Big Cow", a sculpture of an Ayrshire around 7 times as big as a living one.

== Gallery ==
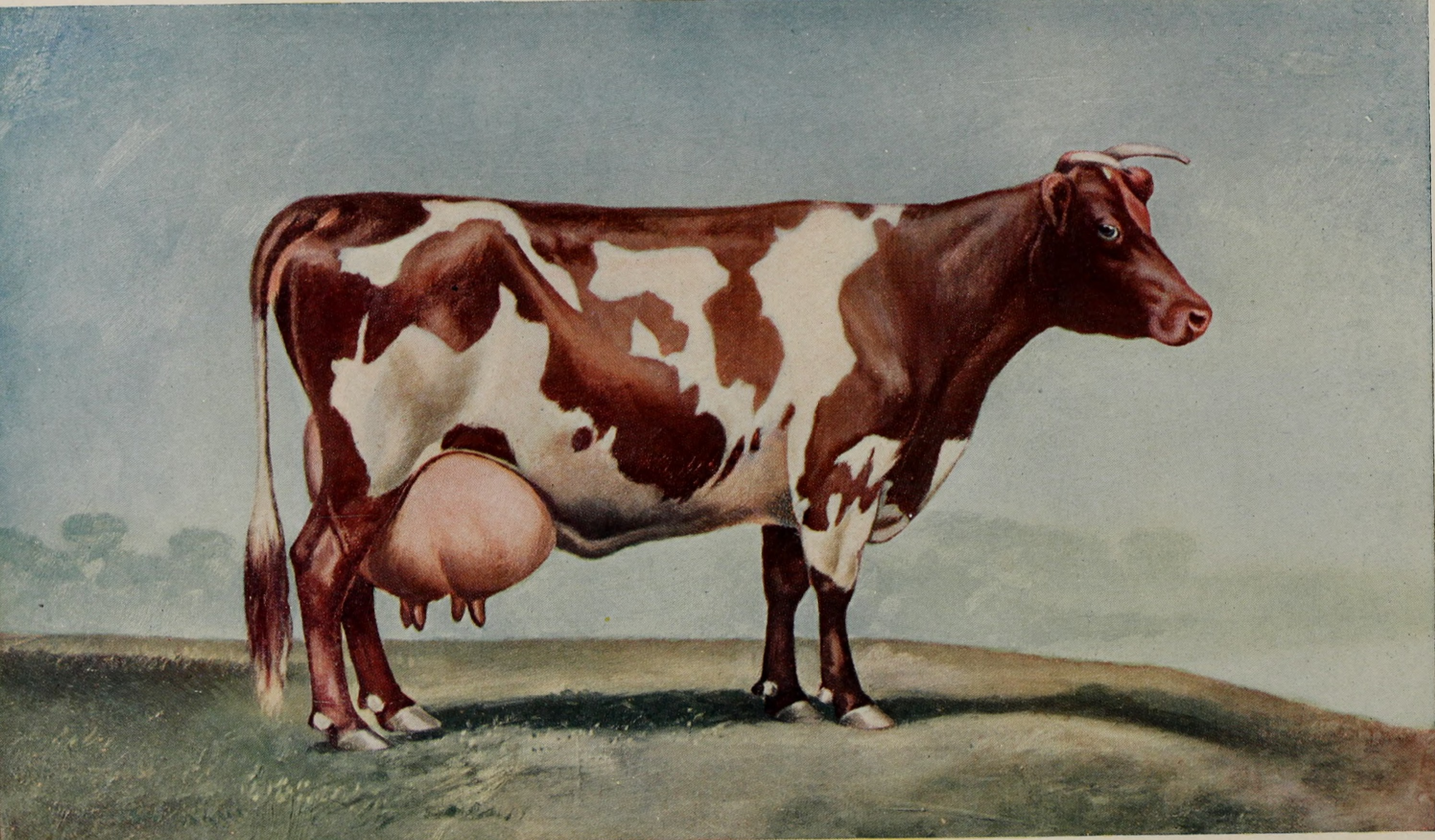
A 1901 illustration; note the curved horns of the era

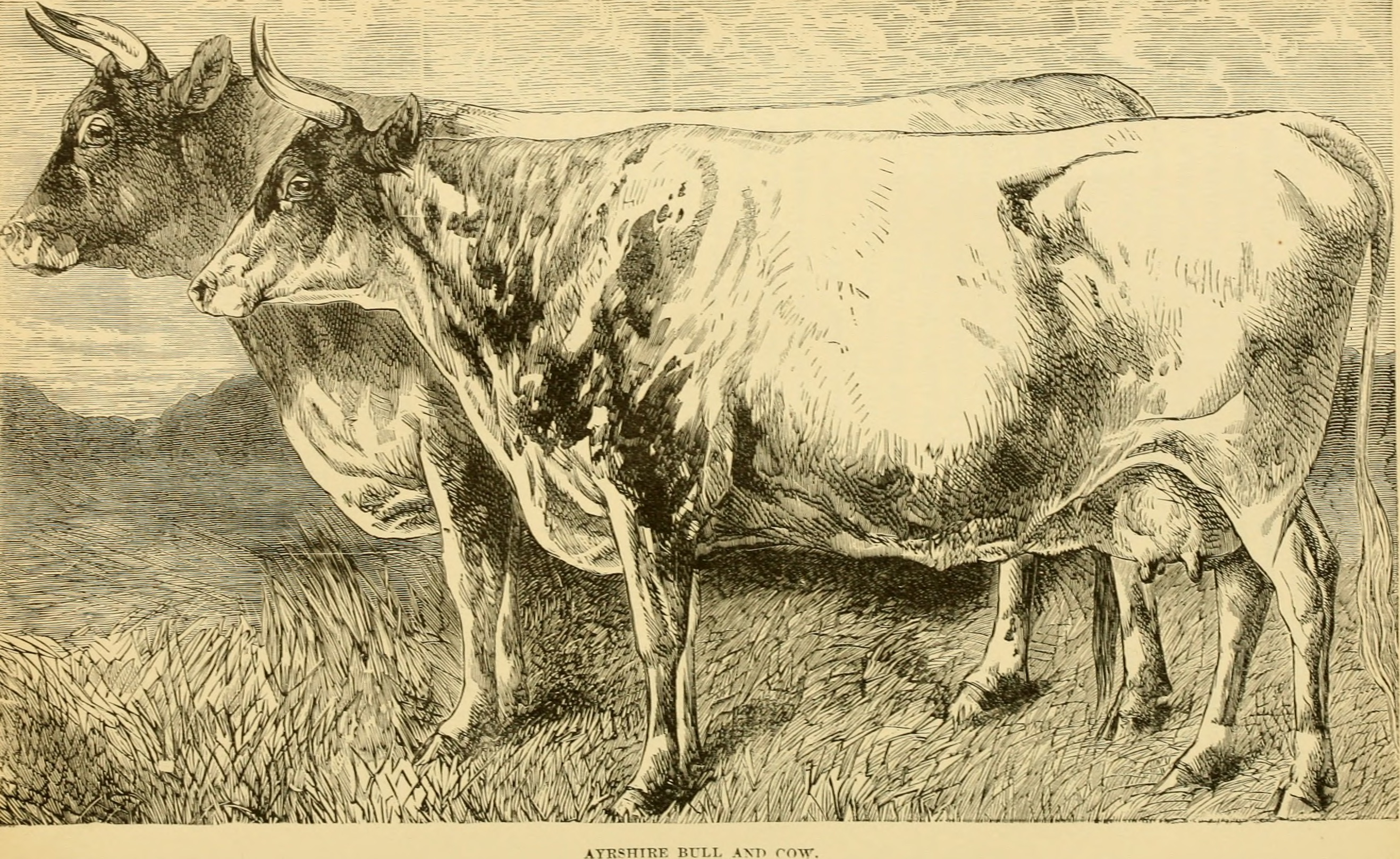
1882 illustration of a bull and cow

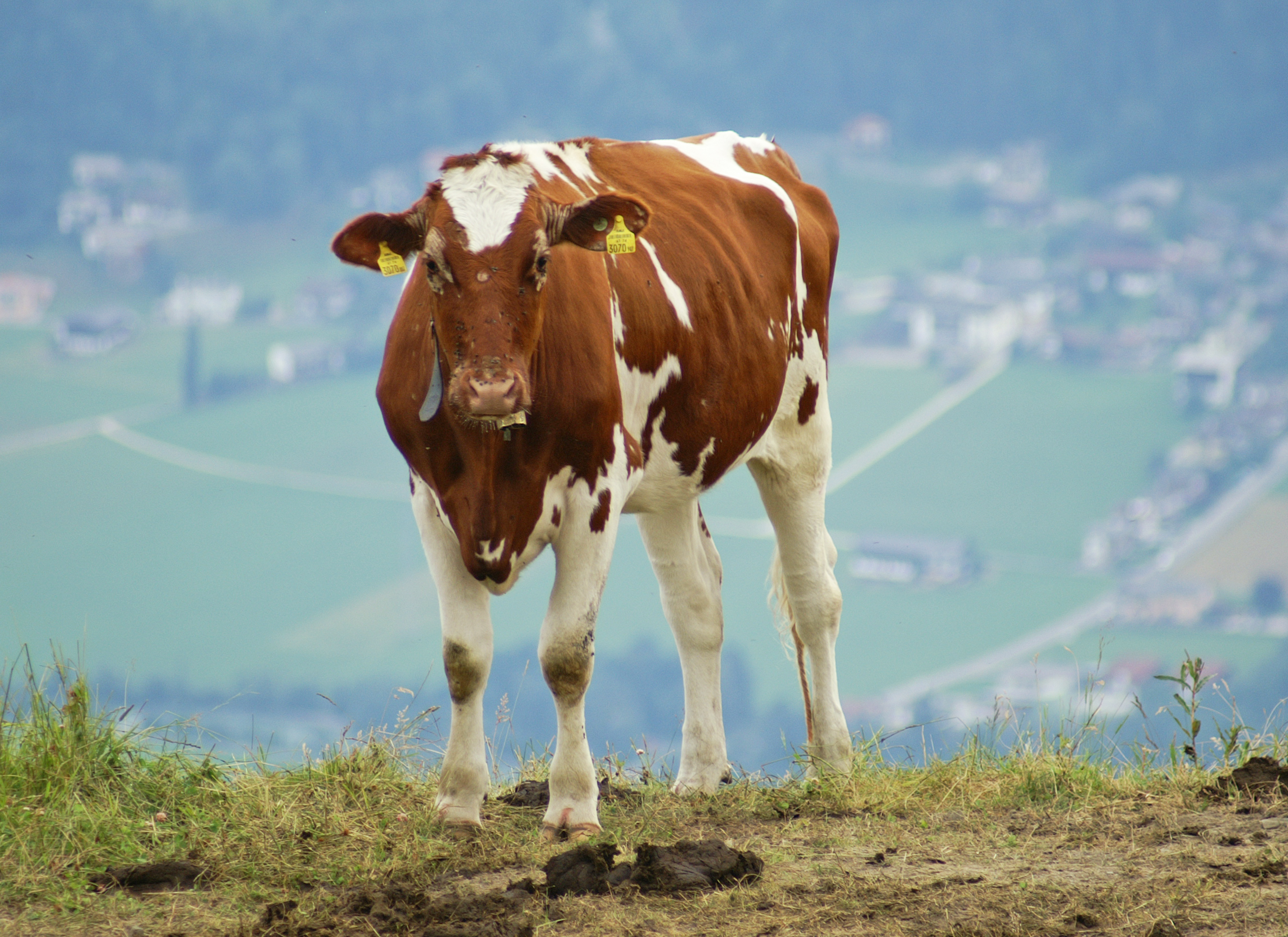
An Ayshire in Austria, 2007
