= Sunshine Coast Light Rail =

Proposed Australian light rail system

Overview
- Status: Early planning stages
- Locale: Sunshine Coast
- Termini: Maroochydore; Caloundra

Service
- Type: Light Rail
- System: Translink
- Services: 1 route (built in two stages)

Technical
- Track gauge: 1,435 mm (4 ft 8 1/2 in)

The Sunshine Coast Light Rail is a proposed light rail system for the Sunshine Coast region of Queensland, Australia. The light rail system would link Maroochydore with Caloundra via Mooloolaba and Kawana and was planned to bring a frequent, high-quality light rail service to meet the region's predicted growth. The system underwent feasibility studies in 2015.

The proposal has not been welcomed by all members of the community with many people believing the project threatens the region's laidback coastal lifestyle.

== History ==
The Sunshine Coast Council reviewed and supported the findings of a pre-feasibility study. In August 2012, the council gave the go-ahead for a full feasibility study to be undertaken. In November 2014, the options were put on display with comments sought with over 700 submissions received. After the council reviewed the outcome of the community consolation in November 2014, they have the confidence to further investigate a light rail corridor. 87% of the survey respondents were in favour of the light rail. As of 2016, the council is exploring potential funding models for the delivery of the project. It noted that the project would still require state government support.

In addition, the council and the Department of Transport and Main Roads are seeking to establish a high frequency bus line that will follow the proposed light rail corridor (as a forerunner) of the light rail system.

== Route Options ==
The proposed system will stretch approximately 20 kilometres from Maroochydore to Caloundra. A full route is still undecided with multiple proposed routes, however following the results of the feasibility study conducted in November 2014, the Sunshine Coast Council have identified a possible route alignment for the light rail. All routes pass through the key activity hubs of Maroochydore, Mooloolaba, Kawana and Caloundra, however various routes are proposed.

=== Recommended Route Alignment ===
Following the community consultation, the council has identified a possible route alignment for the light rail. However, this is still undecided and the previous route proposals are still being looked at.

The new proposed route will follow Option A of the Maroochydore route, commencing at the Plaza Parade in the Maroochydore CBD before cutting through part of the Horton Park Golf Course, then travelling along Aerdrome Road, this route is the quickest route compared to other proposed routes and supports the Maroochydore City Centre Priority Development Area. The route continues along Aerdrome Road towards Mooloolaba. Following route B of the Mooloolaba proposed routes, the route will turn onto Veening Street, just west of the key activity area of Mooloolaba. Travelling along Walan Street, the route will then turn on to Brisbane Road, continuing south towards Kawana. Once in Kawana the light rail will follow route option A passing the Sunshine Coast University Hospital and supports the development of the Kawana Town Centre. The Caloundra corridor is still undecided. The local council will continue to investigate the three proposed routes to find the best route.

=== Proposed Maroochydore routes ===
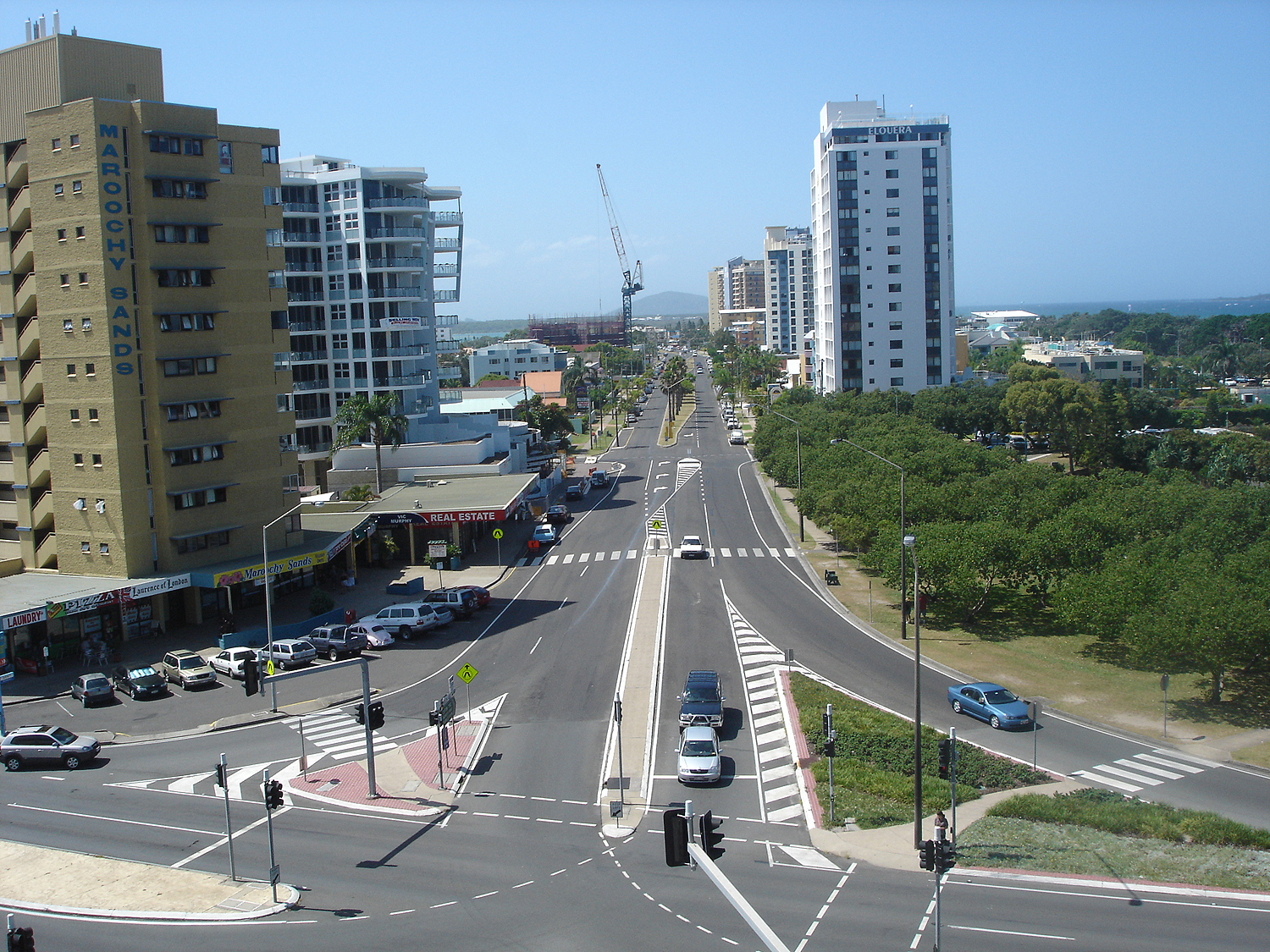
Maroochydore

Maroochydore is the key activity centre on the Sunshine Coast.

==== Option A ====
Option A is the shortest but most direct route resulting in the fastest travel time. This option will start from the Maroochydore CBD and travel along Aerodrome Road towards Mooloolaba. This route option has a wide pedestrian catchment area and supports Maroochydore City Centre Priority Development Area and transit interchange with future heavy rail.

==== Option B ====
A slightly longer route then Option A, Option B will start from the Maroochydore CBD, traveling briefly along Aerodrome Road before going along Kingsford-Smith Parade. This route option has an improved access to the Maroochydore Surf Club and sporting grounds and reduces interference with traffic lights along Aerodrome Road.

==== Option C ====
Option C, although the longest route in the Maroochydore area provides direct access to tourist and residential accommodation and tourist destinations and provides greater access to the Sunshine Plaza, the Sunshine Coast's largest shopping centre.

=== Proposed Mooloolaba routes ===
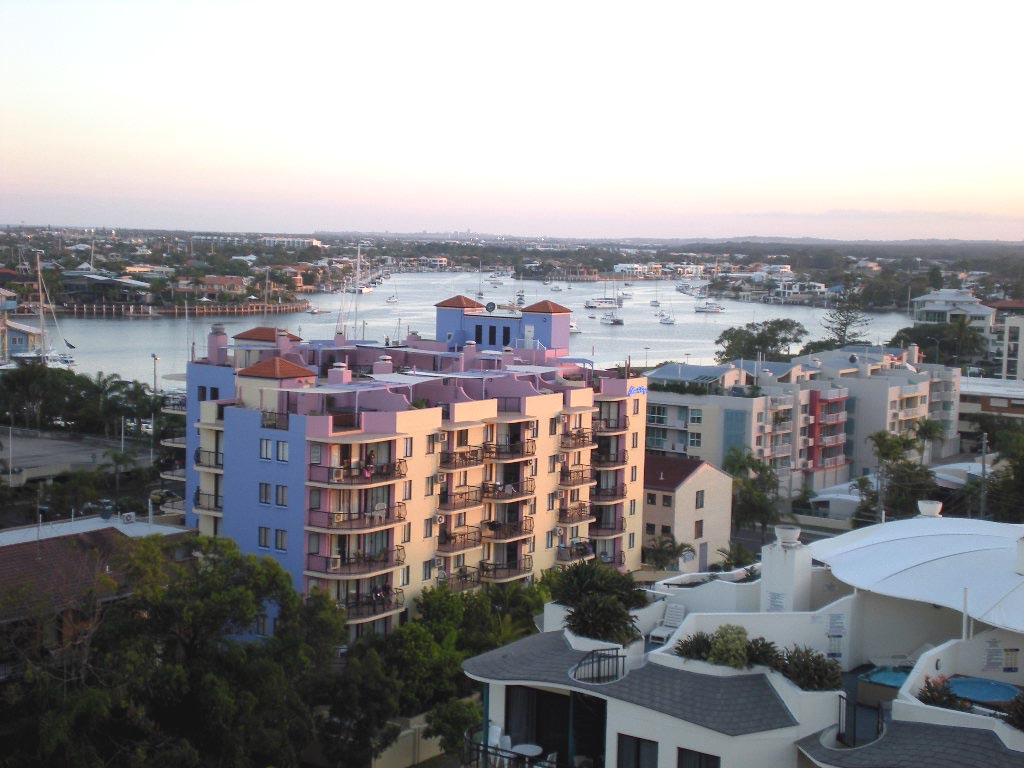
Mooloolaba

Mooloolaba is an established lifestyle and tourism destination.

==== Option A ====
Option A provides excellent access to the beach and fantastic iconic views along the Mooloolaba foreshore. This route option also provides good access to retail and dining along the Mooloolaba Esplanade.

==== Option B ====
Option B, travels along the Mooloolaba Esplanade traveling before travelling along Venning Street, just short of the main retail and dining hot spot of Mooloolaba Esplanade. Option B continues along Venning Street and Walan Street before turning on to Brisbane Road and traveling south towards Kawana.

==== Option C ====
Option C is slightly longer than Option A and B but provides access to the Mooloolaba Spit, Wharf precinct and Surf Club. This route option also provides scenic views along the river edge and could support a new river edge lifestyle precinct.

==== Option D ====
Option D is the longest option in the Mooloolaba area, traveling along the Mooloolaba Esplanade, then along River Esplanade before going along Brisbane Road towards Kawana. This route combines the elements of option A and C, providing scenic views along the Mooloolaba foreshore and river edge as well as excellent access to the beach and the retail and dining precinct along the Mooloolaba Esplanade.

=== Proposed Kawana routes ===
Kawana is one of the fastest growing regions on the Sunshine Coast. Kawana is proposed as the terminus for stage 1 of the light rail project, with stage 2 continuing from Kawana to Caloundra.

==== Option A ====
Option A would be the longest route in the Kawana area and has a number of tight turns, increasing travel time. This route would provide direct access to the Sunshine Coast University Hospital and supports the development of the Kawana Town Centre, Business Village and Bokarina Beach. This option also provides future opportunity for a fully integrated transport interchange with a heavy rail station.

==== Option B ====
Option B followings a similar route to Option A, however aiming to improve on travel time by passing the core of the Kawana Town Centre. This route option, like Option A provides access to the University Hospital and an interchange with a future heavy rail station. This route also travels through the Kawana Industrial Estate.

==== Option C ====
Option C provides access to local schools and sporting facilities and services the existing eastern residential areas of Kawana. The route travels through the Kawana Industrial Estate and supports the development of Bokarina Beach. Option C is a more direct and faster route towards Caloundra then Option's A and B.

==== Option D ====
Option D is both the cheapest and fastest route in the Kawana area, however it limits access to the key destinations of the region. Option D still provides good access to local schools and sporting grounds. This option services the existing eastern residential areas but has over one kilometer walking distance to the key destinations such as the University Hospital and the Kawana Town Centre.

=== Proposed Caloundra routes ===
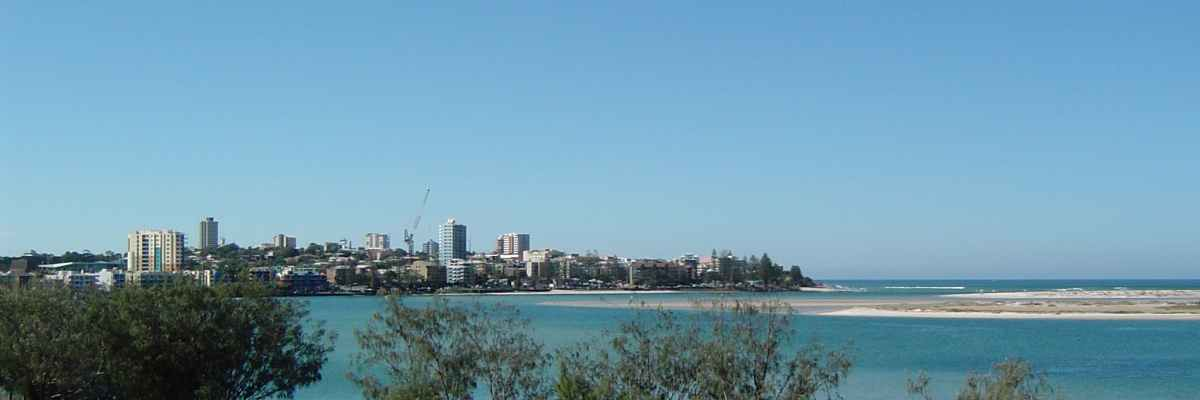
Caloundra

Caloundra is a major lifestyle and tourism destination situated at the southern end of the Sunshine Coast.

==== Option A ====
Option A will travel directly on Nicklin Way to maximize travel speed and provides excellent access to Bulcock Street and Omrah Avenue. The route supports direct access to West Terrace hospital precinct and the RSL club. This route also provides good access to potential development sites along the central areas of Caloundra and partly services the western residential areas, however it bypasses a number of coastal tourist destinations.

==== Option B ====
This option supports direct access to Moffat Bach business and industry precinct as well as direct access to sporting facilities and the Caloundra Primary School. Option B partly services the western residential area and connects commuters with Stockland Caloundra shopping centre.

==== Option C ====
Option C is the longest option in the Caloundra region but provides access with recreation and tourism destinations which the other two options lack as well as the residential areas of central Caloundra. This route provides good access to sporting facilities and the local primary school and establishes strong connectivity to the beach.

== See also ==
- Maroochydore railway line: a proposed heavy railway line from Brisbane and Beerwah to Maroochydore
