= Mark Jamieson (politician) =

Australian politician and former business executive

Mayor of Sunshine Coast Region
- In office 28 April 2012 – 16 March 2024
- Preceded by: Bob Abbot
- Succeeded by: Rosanna Natoli

Personal details
- Party: Independent
- Education: University of Southern Queensland; Australian Institute of Company Directors
- Website: markjamieson.com.au

Mark Jamieson is an Australian politician and former business executive who served as the mayor of the Sunshine Coast Region, the ninth most-populous local government area in Australia, and fifth most-populous in Queensland. He has also served as President of the Local Government Association of Queensland, director of the South-East Queensland Council of Mayors and as a director of the Australian Local Government Association since 2016.

Jamieson was first elected in April 2012 with 31.93% of the primary vote, placing first in a field of 8 candidates. He retained office in 2016 with 61.90% of the vote, and was elected for the third time at the local government elections held in 2020, winning 49.48%.

Jamieson announced in November 2023 that he would not be recontesting the position at the 2024 Queensland local elections. He was succeeded by television presenter Rosanna Natoli.

Prior to his election to the mayoralty, Jamieson served in various senior executive positions, including as CEO of Australia-New Zealand publishing company APN News & Media. Jamieson is a graduate of the Australian Institute of Company Directors.
