= William Kennish =

Manx engineer, inventor, explorer, scientist, and poet

William Kennish (1799 – March 19, 1862) was an engineer, inventor, explorer, scientist, and poet, known primarily for inventions developed while he served in the British Royal Navy (1821–1841). They ranged from improvements for artillery to navigation and steering devices.

After retiring from the Navy, Kennish worked as a schoolteacher on the Isle of Man. But in 1849, he migrated to the United States for more opportunities. He began surveying gold lands in Colombia, South America, for firms based in New York City. In 1855 he completed a report on a potential river aqueduct or canal across the northwest isthmus of present-day Colombia, using the Atrato River and emptying into Bahia Humboldt, Chocó and the Pacific Ocean. That year Congress approved a joint military expedition of a US Navy and Army party to explore this, and Kennish acted as their guide. He later died in New York.

== Life ==
Kennish was born in the Parish of Maughold, on the Isle of Man, in a cottage at Cornaa on the Douglas-Ramsey Road. His parents were farmers, and he learned farming from his father. He grew up speaking Manx as his first language. He knew very little English until after he became a seaman in the Royal Navy at the age of 22. He learned English and rose to the rank of Master Carpenter by the time he was 27. In October 1826, he married Mary Byford, of Gillingham, Chatham, Kent, England.

Between 1827 and 1832, while in the service of the Royal Navy, he invented a system ("A Method for Concentrating the Fire of a Broadside") for improving the aiming of naval artillery. Other inventions included a fuze for a shell, and a system for floating naval artillery to shore for land use. He invented a marine theodolite, which was a key element of his improved method. He proposed the practice of painting naval vessels grey to reduce the distortion and decay caused by solar radiation on black-painted timbers. He also worked on creating an artificial horizon for navigation; a[n] automatic depth-sounding instrument; a method of drowning the magazine of a ship of war; an hydraulic ventilator; [and] a hydrostatic diving machine[.]

When the Royal Navy became interested in steam propulsion, between 1832 and 1840, Kennish designed several steam engines and an early screw propeller; but the Royal Navy did not take up his ideas. Disenchanted, he retired from the Royal Navy in November 1841. He worked for the Civilian Architect's Office at Woolwich Dockyard, London, until March 1844, when he and his family departed to settle on the Isle of Man.

After leaving the Royal Navy and his scientific pursuits, Kennish began writing poetry about 1840. His collection of poems, Mona's Isle and Other Poems, was published in 1844 in London, and was promoted in newspapers on the Isle of Man.

In 1845 Kennish was hired as a parochial school master in Ballasalla but was not successful. In debt, he was imprisoned for debt for a brief time that year in Castle Rushen, Isle of Man. Shortly after this the debt was resolved, and Kennish was hired by the Royal Navy to conduct surveys of the coastline of the Isle of Man. Also about this time, he invented a pneumatic tube system to convey messages and suggested its use to the Admiralty. They did not adopt it but it was later used by the General Post Office in London. He promoted the idea after migrating to the United States, and it became widely used there in the years after his death.

=== Migration to the USA ===
In 1849, Kennish migrated to the United States for more opportunities. He soon began surveying gold-bearing land in Chocó Department, Colombia, in South America. In 1855 he planned a route for an inter-oceanic river aqueduct across the northwest isthmus in this province, for the Hope Association of New York. His report on his survey of this proposed canal route was included in The Practicality and Importance of a Ship Canal to Connect the Atlantic and Pacific Oceans, published in 1855 by George F. Nesbitt & Co. of New York. According to his papers, Kennish proposed to use part of the Atrato River (which flows north into the Atlantic), and possibly its tributary Rio Truando, to create a river aqueduct and inter-oceanic route across the isthmus of northwest present-day Colombia, through Nerqua Pass and the valley of the Nerqua, to empty into Bahía Humboldt on the Pacific Ocean side.

That year the US Congress approved a joint US Navy-Army military expedition to explore Kennish's proposed route in Chocó Department, Colombia. He was chosen as guide for the expedition.

Kennish died in New York City in 1862. On March 19, 2017, a headstone was placed on his previously unmarked grave, reading "William Kennish | Born Cornaa, Isle of Man | Baptised February 24, 1799 | Died New York, March 19, 1862 | Manninagh Dooie - True Manxman | Royal Navy Carpenter, Inventor, Poet, Explorer, | and Discoverer in 1855 of the first route without | locks linking the Pacific and Atlantic oceans | This Memorial was placed by his descendants, the school's children, and the people of the Isle of Man in 2017.

Colombia, which then controlled all of the isthmus, rejected an offer from the US in the 19th century to build a canal across it. No further United States action was taken on a canal until after Panama revolted against Colombia and became independent in 1903. The Panamanians "negotiated a treaty with the United States that created a Canal Zone 10 miles (16 km) wide under U.S. sovereignty in exchange for an agreement by the United States to build the canal and to provide a regular annual payment to Panama. Although the U.S. government later agreed to pay $25 million to Colombia, the episode embittered Colombian-U.S. relations for many years." The canal was constructed from 1904 to 1914.
