= Alice Dovey =

American actress

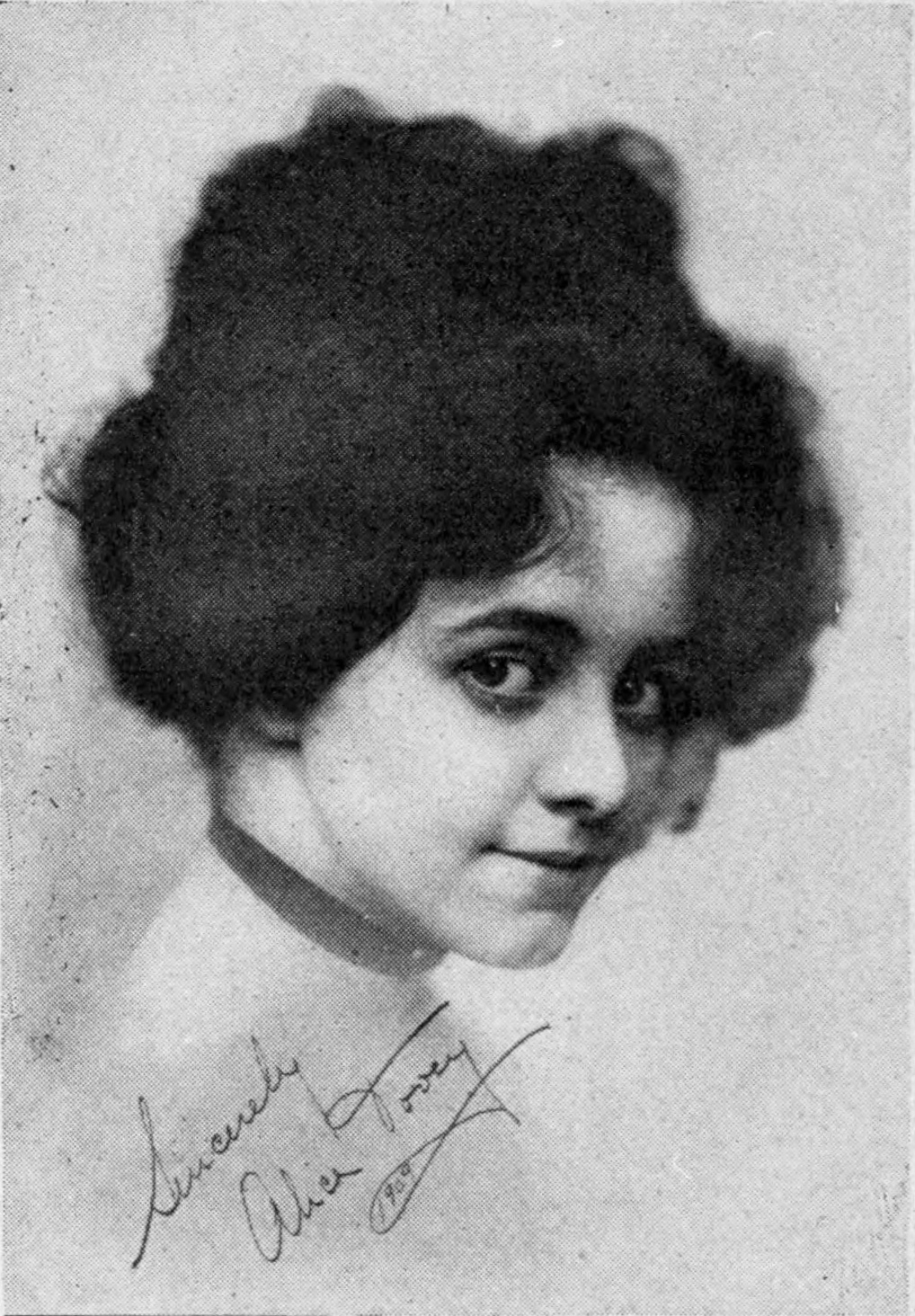
- The Actors' Birthday Book, 1909
- Born: August 28, 1884; Plattsmouth, Nebraska
- Died: January 12, 1969 (aged 84); Tarzana, California
- Occupation: Actress
- Spouse: John E. Hazzard (m. 1917-1935; his death)
- Children: 2

Alice Dovey (August 28, 1884 – January 12, 1969) was an American motion picture comedian and actress who first appeared in The Commanding Officer (1915). This was a Famous Players Lasky movie which was directed by Alan Dwan. The title role in the film was played by Donald Crisp, with Dovey playing the role of his wife.

Dovey was a Plattsmouth, Nebraska native who was educated in England with her sister, Ethel, under the care of Miss Lillian Terry.

She debuted at the Broadway Theatre on January 25, 1909, after making many appearances in non-metropolitan venues, while acquiring performing skills. Among her first stage appearances was her depiction of Goldenrod in Miss Bob White, during the 1903–1904 theatrical season. In the summer of 1904 Dovey played Turtledove in Woodland, in Boston, Massachusetts.

During the winter of 1905 the actress was part of a professional cast with the Frank L. Perley Opera Company. She acted in support of Viola Gillette, playing the role of Cherry in The Girl and the Bandit. In June 1905 Dovey acted the part of Reflection in The Land of Nod, staged in Chicago.

She devoted the 1906 theatrical season to the role of Dorothy Willetts, originally played by Elsie Janis. She received favorable critical acclaim while performing with the touring company, The Vanderbilt Cup.

The part of Lois in Stubborn Cinderella was a milestone for Dovey, who created the character. Lois was introduced to a Chicago audience on June 1, 1908. She later made a great success touring in the role which suited her nicely because of her beauty, which was of a girlish type. In 1911, she performed in The Pink Lady

== Personal life ==
Dovey married fellow actor and playwright John E. Hazzard on June 6, 1917 in New York City. They had two children. By 1922, six years after she retired, she was considered unfamiliar to current film fans of the day. Her husband died in 1935, and she died in Tarzana, California, in 1969, aged 84.
