= Sunshine Coast Region =

- Local government area
- Location within South East Queensland

- Interactive map of Sunshine Coast Region
- Coordinates: 26°39′15″S 153°05′36″E
- Country: Australia
- State: Queensland
- Region: South East Queensland
- Established: 16 March 2008
- Council seat: Maroochydore

Government
  - Mayor: Rosanna Natoli
  - State electorate: Buderim, Caloundra, Glass House, Kawana, Maroochydore, Nicklin, Ninderry
  - Federal division: Fairfax, Fisher, Wide Bay

Area
  - Total: 2,254 km^{2} (870 sq mi)

Population
  - Total: 342,541 (2021 census) (9th)
  - Density: 151.97/km^{2} (393.60/sq mi)
- Website: Sunshine Coast Region
LGAs around Sunshine Coast Region
Gympie	Noosa	Coral Sea
Somerset	Sunshine Coast Region	Coral Sea
Moreton Bay	Moreton Bay	Coral Sea

The Sunshine Coast Region is a local government area located in the Sunshine Coast region of South East Queensland, Australia, from which it takes its name.

It was created by the amalgamation in 2008 of the City of Caloundra and the Shires of Maroochy and Noosa. It contains 4,194 kilometres (2,606 mi) of roads, 211 kilometres (131 mi) of coastline and a population of 351,424 in January 2021. The budget for the 2020–2021 financial year totals A$782 million including $243 million for Capital Works.

On 1 January 2014, the Shire of Noosa was re-established independent of the Sunshine Coast Regional Council.

In the 2021 census, the Sunshine Coast Region had a population of 342,541 people.

== History ==
Gubbi Gubbi (Kabi Kabi, Cabbee, Carbi, Gabi Gabi) is an Australian Aboriginal language spoken on Gubbi Gubbi country. The Gubbi Gubbi language region includes the landscape within the local government boundaries of the Sunshine Coast Region and Gympie Region, particularly the towns of Caloundra, Noosa Heads, Gympie and extending north towards Maryborough and south to Caboolture.

Prior to 2008, the new Sunshine Coast Region was an entire area of three previous and distinct local government areas:

- the City of Caloundra;
- the Shire of Maroochy;
- and the Shire of Noosa.

At the establishment of regional local government in Queensland on 11 November 1879 with the Divisional Boards Act 1879, most of the area was part of the Caboolture Division, while the northernmost part around Noosa was part of the Widgee Division centred on Gympie. The Maroochy Division split away from Caboolture on 5 July 1890. All three divisions became Shires on 31 July 1903 under the Local Authorities Act 1902.

In 1910, the Shire of Noosa split from Widgee, and on 22 February 1912 the Shire of Landsborough split from Caboolture. The two new entities together with Maroochy were to remain fairly stable for almost 100 years.

On 19 December 1987, the Shire of Landsborough was granted City status, and was renamed the City of Caloundra, reflecting the population boom in the coastal section of the City.

In July 2007, the Local Government Reform Commission released its report and recommended that the three local governments amalgamate. While it noted all three were "functioning councils with moderate to strong financial performance", it argued that they covered a self-contained region in a geographic, social and economic sense and that the advantages of coordinated planning in a high-growth area and the avoidance of duplication of facilities were arguments in favour of amalgamation. The councils opposed the amalgamation, and the Commission itself noted that the bulk of statewide individual submissions came from this region reflecting a "depth of feeling" regarding the issue. On 15 March 2008, the City and two Shires formally ceased to exist, and elections were held on the same day to elect twelve councillors and a mayor to the Regional Council.

In the 2011 census, the Sunshine Coast Region had the 4th largest population of any local government area in Australia (following the City of Brisbane, City of Gold Coast and City of Moreton Bay).

In 2012, a proposal was made to de-amalgamate the Shire of Noosa from the Sunshine Coast Region. On 9 March 2013, Noosa residents voted to de-amalgamate Noosa from the Sunshine Coast Council. On 18 March 2013, the Sunshine Coast Regional Council decided its new planning scheme should not apply to those areas that were part of the former Noosa Shire (different attitudes to planning and developments having been a major objection by residents of Noosa Shire to the amalgamation). The Shire of Noosa Shire was re-established on 1 January 2014.

== Demographics ==
The populations given relate to the component entities prior to 2008. The 2016 census, did not include the Shire of Noosa's census figures.

Year	Population (Region total)	Population (Caloundra)	Population (Maroochy)	Population (Noosa)	Notes
1933	23,438	4,752	12,918	5,768	
1947	27,399	6,460	15,014	5,925	
1954	31,930	7,765	17,869	6,296	
1961	33,507	8,319	19,071	6,117	
1966	36,926	8,798	21,455	6,673	
1971	44,582	11,314	25,522	7,746	
1976	63,073	16,982	35,266	10,825	
1981	100,204	29,705	53,428	17,071	
1986	118,443	36,486	61,629	20,328	
1991	167,254	53,434	84,442	29,378	
1996	219,305	66,336	111,798	41,171	
2001	252,011	75,261	129,429	47,321	
2006	293,902	90,341	151,599	51,962	
2008	Caloundra, Maroochy, and Noosa amalgamated				
2011 census	306,909				
2014	Noosa deamalgamated				
2016 census	294,367				
2021 census	342,541				

== Industry ==
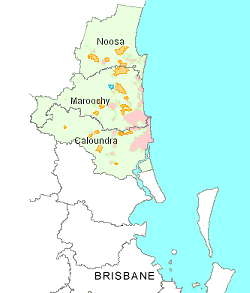
Map of Sunshine coast

The Sunshine Coast economy is dominated by two sectors – Healthcare (including age-care) and Retail, which provide 30% of the regional employment. Other significant areas are accommodation and food services, education, construction, manufacturing and professional services. Efforts are being made to diversify the regional economy by the Sunshine Coast Regional Council.

Local educational institutions, government and community groups have funded a number of initiatives to encourage entrepreneurial and innovative businesses to the area. The University of the Sunshine Coast's Innovation Centre acts as an incubator startup companies, as does the Spark Bureau. The University site at Sippy Downs is designated as a 'Knowledge Hub' as part of the Queensland Government's South East Queensland Regional Infrastructure Plan and is master planned as Australia's first university town based on the UK models with the potential for over 6,000 workers in knowledge-based businesses. Sippy Downs was highlighted as an 'Innovation Hotspot' in July 2010, by top European Business magazine CNBC Business, with the potential to be 'Australia's no-worries-answer to Silicon Valley'.

== Infrastructure ==
=== Education ===
The Sunshine Coast's major university is the University of the Sunshine Coast with its main campus at Sippy Downs. Central Queensland University also has a campus in Noosa. TAFE Queensland services the Sunshine Coast and Wide Bay regions through TAFE East Coast, with three Sunshine Coast campuses at Mooloolaba, Maroochydore and Nambour as well as a Noosa campus.

The Sunshine Coast has many varied denomination, private and public primary and secondary schools (see List of schools in Sunshine Coast). The Lexis English group, providing English classes to international students, has a campus in Maroochydore, while Lexis TESOL Training Centres provides teacher training programs such as the Cambridge CELTA and TESOL.

=== Libraries ===
The Sunshine Coast Regional Council operates libraries at Beerwah, Buddina (Kawana), Caloundra, Coolum Beach, Kenilworth, Maleny, Maroochydore and Nambour. It also operates a mobile library service visiting Beerburrum, Bli Bli, Buderim, Caloundra West (Bellvista), Conondale, Eudlo, Eumundi, Glass House Mountains, Little Mountain, Montville, Mooloolah Valley, Mooloolaba (Parkhaven), Mount Coolum, Mountain Creek, Pacific Paradise, Palmwoods, Parklands, Peachester, Pelican Waters, Peregian Springs, Sippy Downs (Chancellor Park) and Yandina.

=== Health ===
The Sunshine Coast University Hospital is the region's major hospital located in Birtinya, which opened in April 2017. The region's previous major hospital located in Nambour will be downsized and renovated, however it still operates as the coast's secondary hospital. Services remaining in Nambour General Hospital include emergency, cancer care, same-day and elective surgery, general medicine inpatient services, renal dialysis, outpatient services, medical imaging, pharmacy, diabetes services, oral health, allied health, mental health and breastcreen. There are smaller hospitals located in Caloundra and Maleny but, due to limited facilities at those hospitals, most cases are referred to the SCUH.

A number of private hospitals exist throughout the region, most notably the 'Sunshine Coast Private Hospital' at Buderim, Caloundra Private Hospital (formerly known as Andrea Ahern) at Caloundra, Selangor Hospital at Nambour, the recently established Kawana Private Hospital.

=== Transport ===
==== Road ====
The car is the predominant mode of transport for Sunshine Coast residents, with the region connected to Brisbane via the Bruce Highway. The Nicklin Way and Sunshine Motorway are the major arterial roads, which pass through most major areas of the Sunshine Coast. Many intercity and interstate coach operators also operate daily bus services to Brisbane using the major corridors.

==== Public transport ====
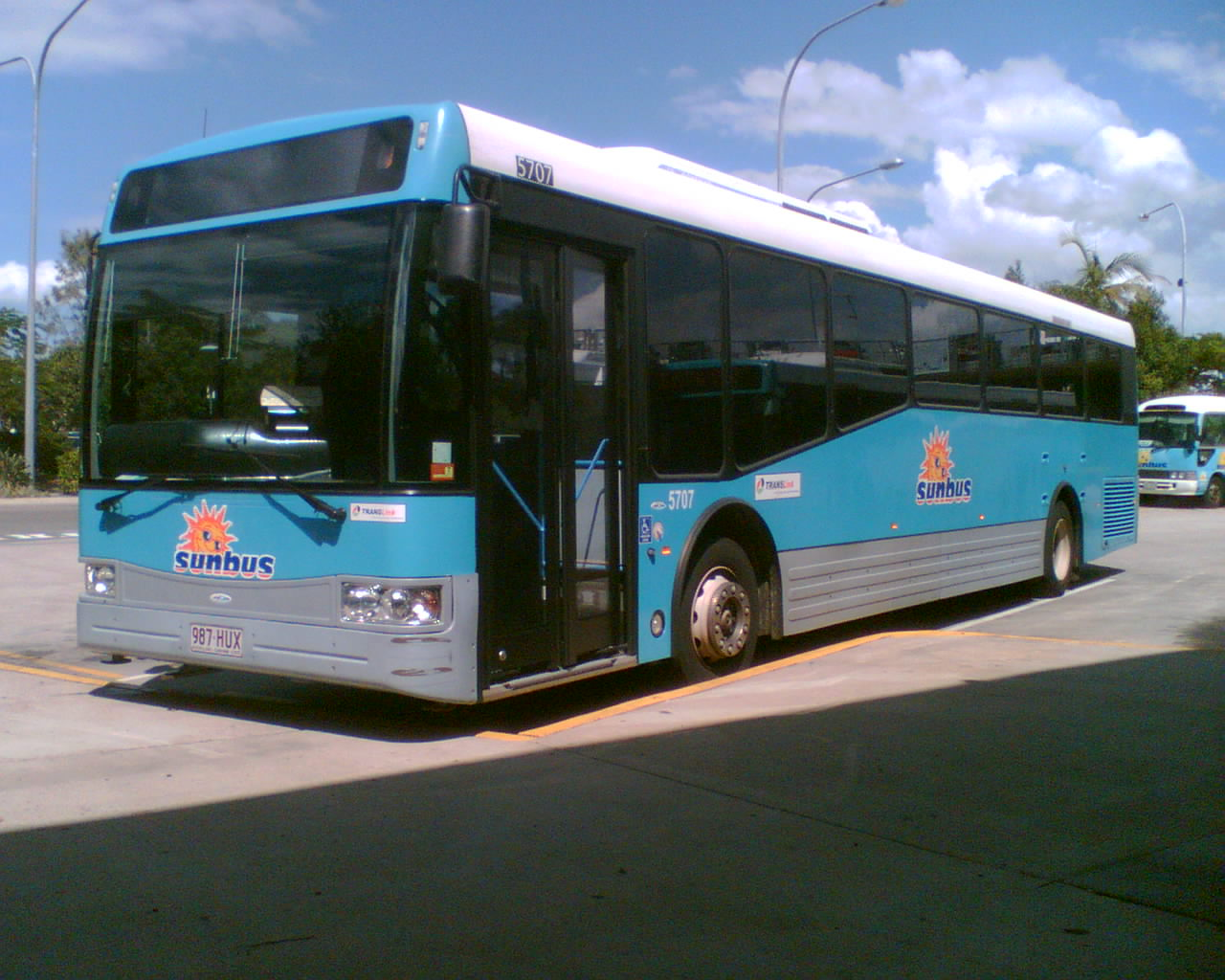
Kinetic Sunshine Coast services all the major centres on the Sunshine Coast

The Sunshine Coast is a growing region, and has a variety of transport modes including train, local bus services, ferry and the Sunshine Coast Airport. However, in recent years the local council has been looking at more reliant, high quality public transport options to create a 'transport spin' on the Sunshine Coast with the Maroochydore railway line and Sunshine Coast Light Rail proposed.

Plane

Flights from the Sunshine Coast depart from Sunshine Coast Airport, which is located 10 km (6.2 mi) north of Maroochydore in Marcoola, and fly direct to Sydney, Melbourne. Adelaide and Auckland with Jetstar, Virgin Australia, Qantas and Air New Zealand.

Rail

Queensland Rail's Sunshine Coast railway line operate interurban services daily, with most trains running express between Caboolture and Bowen Hills stations. The train lines run through the Sunshine Coast Hinterland, with buses connecting to the coastal strip. Further north of the Nambour station, commuter trains operate to Gympie twice per day. Landsborough and Nambour railway stations also serve as a gateway to Queensland's network of long-distance trains, providing access to destinations including Rockhampton, Townsville and Cairns.

Bus

Bus services are operated by Kinetic Sunshine Coast under contract to Translink. These buses connect the suburbs and localities within the Caloundra, Maroochydore and Noosa areas. Sunshine Coast Council operates zero-fare bus services throughout the coast to surrounding suburbs and major park and ride stations during the peak summer holiday period.

=== Sport and recreation ===
Sunshine Coast Stadium is located at Kawana Waters and is home to the region's sporting teams in statewide competitions. The Sunshine Coast Falcons compete in the Queensland Cup rugby league competition while the Sunshine Coast Fire FC compete in the National Premier Leagues Queensland Football competition. The Sunshine Coast has numerous golf links, including Headland Golf Club (Buderim), Pelican Waters, Pacific Harbour, Twin Waters, Palmer Coolum Resort (previously Hyatt Regency Coolum), Mount Coolum, Beerwah, Maleny, Cooroy, Caloundra and Maroochy River. The Sunshine Coast Regional Tennis Centre is located at Caloundra.

== Media ==
There are several newspapers which cover the Sunshine Coast region. Sunshine Coast Daily is published Monday to Saturday by APN News & Media. Free distribution weekly community newspapers published by APN include: Buderim Chronicle, Caloundra Weekly, Coolum & North Shore News, Kawana Weekly, Nambour Weekly, and Range News. Independent weekly newspapers include Glasshouse Country News and Hinterland Times.

While much of traditional media has an online presence there has also arisen media organisations that are exclusively online. View News is one such organisation operating a news site for the Sunshine Coast concentrating on local news from the various Sunshine Coast communities.

Sunshine Coast is served by publicly owned and operated television services (ABC TV), (SBS) Television and three commercial television stations (Seven Queensland, WIN Television and 10), which are the directly owned and operated stations of Seven, Nine and Network 10. Both sets of commercial stations are available throughout the Sunshine Coast. Other channels include 10 Drama, 10 Comedy, Nickelodeon, News24 Regional (regional only), ABC Family/ABC Kids, ABC Entertains, ABC News, SBS World Movies, SBS2, SBS Food, NITV, SBS WorldWatch, 7two, 7mate, 7Bravo, 7flix, 9Gem, 9Go!, 9Rush and 9Life. The Sunshine Coast is also in the television broadcast licence areas of Brisbane (metro), enabling most areas of the Sunshine Coast to receive the commercial Brisbane stations. Subscription television services Foxtel and Austar are also available.

All three main commercial networks produce local news coverage – Seven Queensland and WIN Television both air 30-minute local news bulletins at 6pm each weeknight. Network 10 airs short news updates of 10 News.

Seven's bulletin is produced and broadcast from studios in Maroochydore, from where six sister local news programs for regional Queensland also originate. WIN News is also produced from a newsroom in Maroochydore, but broadcasts from studios in Wollongong.

The Sunshine Coast region is served by commercial, community and government radio stations. Commercial stations 91.9 Sea FM and 92.7 Mix FM are owned and operated by the EON Broadcasting, one of Australia's last independent broadcasters. Rival commercial operator Grant Broadcasters runs 91.1 Hot FM and Zinc96. The Government-owned ABC services the region with 90.3 ABC Coast FM and ABC NewsRadio on 94.5 FM, Triple J on 89.5 FM and ABC Classic on 88.7 FM. Many community access stations, as well as some Brisbane stations, can also be received.

== Council ==
Sunshine Coast Council

Leadership
- Mayor: Rosanna Natoli
- Deputy Mayor: Maria Suarez

Structure
- Political groups: Independent (7); Independent LNP (3); Independent ALP (1)

Elections
- Last election: 15 March 2024
- Next election: 25 March 2028

Sunshine Coast Council consists of 10 divisions (wards), each represented by one councillor, plus an elected mayor who represents the entire region. The council is elected for a four-year term. A deputy mayor is selected by council, also for a four-year term.

From the region's founding in 2008 to 31 December 2013, there were 12 divisions. Divisions 11 and 12 were abolished with the de-amalgamation of the Shire of Noosa.

=== Current composition ===
The current council, elected in 2024, is:

Division	Councillor	Party
Mayor	Rosanna Natoli	Independent
Division 1	Jenny Broderick	Independent
Division 2	Terry Landsberg	Independent LNP
Division 3	Tim Burns	Independent
Division 4	Joe Natoli	Independent
Division 5	Winston Johnston	Independent LNP
Division 6	Christian Dickson	Independent
Division 7	Ted Hungerford	Independent LNP
Division 8	Taylor Bunnag	Independent Labor
Division 9	Maria Suarez	Independent
Division 10	David Law	Independent

== Mayors and Deputy mayors ==
=== Mayors ===
No.	Portrait	Mayor	Party	Term start	Term end	Council control (term)
1		Bob Abbot	Independent	15 March 2008	28 April 2012	Independents majority (2008–present)
2		Mark Jamieson	Independent	28 April 2012	16 March 2024	Independents majority (2008–present)
3		Rosanna Natoli	Independent	16 March 2024	incumbent	Independents majority (2008–present)

=== Deputy mayors ===
No.	Portrait	Mayor	Party	Term start	Term end	Mayor
1		Tim Dwyer	Independent	2008	2012	Abbot (Independent)
2		Chris Thompson	Independent	2012	2016	Jamieson (Independent)
(1)		Tim Dwyer	Independent	2016	2020	Jamieson (Independent)
4		Rick Baberowski	Independent	2020	2024	Jamieson (Independent)
5		Maria Suarez	Independent	2024	incumbent	Natoli (Independent)

== Councillors ==
Year	Division 1	Division 2	Division 3	Division 4	Division 5	Division 6	Division 7	Division 8	Division 9	Division 10	Division 11	Division 12
Year	Councillor											
2008	Anna Grosskreutz (Ind.)	Tim Dwyer (Ind.)	Keryn Jones (Ind.)	Chris Thompson (Ind.)	Jenny McKay (Ind.)	Christian Dickson (Ind.)	Ted Hungerford (Ind. LNP)	Debbie Blumel (Ind.)	Vivien Griffin (Ind.)	Paul Tatton (Ind.)	Russell Green (Ind.)	Lew Brennan (Ind.)
2012	Rick Baberowski (Ind.)	Tim Dwyer (Ind.)	Peter Cox (Ind.)	Chris Thompson (Ind.)	Jenny McKay (Ind.)	Christian Dickson (Ind.)	Ted Hungerford (Ind. LNP)	Jason O'Pray (Ind.)	Steve Robinson (Ind.)	Greg Rogerson (Ind.)	Russell Green (Ind.)	Tony Wellington (Ind.)
2014	Rick Baberowski (Ind.)	Tim Dwyer (Ind.)	Peter Cox (Ind.)	Chris Thompson (Ind.)	Jenny McKay (Ind.)	Christian Dickson (Ind.)	Ted Hungerford (Ind. LNP)	Jason O'Pray (Ind.)	Steve Robinson (Ind.)	Greg Rogerson (Ind.)	Divisions 11 and 12 abolished (2014−present)	
2016	Rick Baberowski (Ind.)	Tim Dwyer (Ind.)	Peter Cox (Ind.)	John Connolly (Ind.)	Jenny McKay (Ind.)	Christian Dickson (Ind.)	Ted Hungerford (Ind. LNP)	Jason O'Pray (Ind.)	Steve Robinson (Ind.)	Greg Rogerson (Ind.)	Divisions 11 and 12 abolished (2014−present)	
2020	Rick Baberowski (Ind.)	Terry Landsberg (Ind. LNP)	Peter Cox (Ind.)	Joe Natoli (Ind.)	Winston Johnston (Ind. LNP)	Christian Dickson (Ind.)	Ted Hungerford (Ind. LNP)	Jason O'Pray (Ind.)	Maria Suarez (Ind.)	David Law (Ind.)	Divisions 11 and 12 abolished (2014−present)	
2024 (incumbents)	Jenny Broderick (Ind.)	Terry Landsberg (Ind. LNP)	Tim Burns (Ind.)	Joe Natoli (Ind.)	Winston Johnston (Ind. LNP)	Christian Dickson (Ind.)	Ted Hungerford (Ind. LNP)	Taylor Bunnag (Ind. ALP)	Maria Suarez (Ind.)	David Law (Ind.)	Divisions 11 and 12 abolished (2014−present)	

== Sister cities and Friendship cities ==
As of March 2016, the Sunshine Coast Region has the following sister cities:

- Tatebayashi, Japan
- March, Fenland District, Northeast Cambridgeshire, England

As of March 2016, the Sunshine Coast Region has the following friendship cities:

- Xiamen, China
- Mont Dore, New Caledonia
