= Kim Dovey =

Australian architectural critic

Kim Dovey FASSA is an Australian architectural and urban critic and Professor of Architecture and Urban Design at the University of Melbourne, Australia, teaching and researching architecture, urban design and urban planning.

Born in Western Australia he received degrees in architecture from Curtin University and the University of Melbourne, and a Ph.D. from the University of California, Berkeley, USA. He has lectured and broadcast widely on social and morphological issues in architecture, urban design and urban planning. His early work on phenomenology of place expanded into critiques of buildings and cities as mediators of power. The book Framing Places (2nd ed. 2008) explores the politics of public space, housing enclaves, shopping malls and corporate towers. Becoming Places (2010) explores the formation of place identity and develops a theory of place as a dynamic assemblage. Urban Design Thinking (2016) is a broad-ranging application of assemblage thinking in urban design. Mapping Urbanities (2017) demonstrates the use of urban mapping in the production of spatial knowledge.

He has led or collaborated in a series of research projects funded by the Australian Research Council focused on issues of urban character, urban intensification, transit-oriented urbanism, school design and creative cities. This work has contributed to theories of place, homelessness, transit-oriented development, urban density, walkability, and creative clustering.

More recent work has focused on informal urbanism in cities of the global South. The Atlas of Informal Settlement (2023) is the first global comparative study of informal urban design. The Spatial Logic of Informal Urbanism (2024) demonstrates how informal street vending, transport and settlement work to sustain livelihoods within global South cities. In 2018 he was the founding Director (now co-director) of the Informal Urbanism Research Hub (InfUr-) at the Faculty of Architecture, Building & Planning, University of Melbourne.

He is a recipient of several research awards including an Australian Urban Design Award, and awards from the Australian Institute of Architects (AIA) and the Planning Institute of Australia (PIA). In November 2022 he was elected a Fellow of the Academy of the Social Sciences in Australia.
