= Tim Dwyer (rugby league) =

Australian rugby league footballer

Personal information
- Full name: Timothy Dwyer
- Born: 31 May 1963 (age 63) Nambour, Queensland, Australia

Playing information
- Position: Fullback, Wing
Club
| Years | Team | Pld | T | G | FG | P |
|---|---|---|---|---|---|---|
| 1985–88 | Barrow |
| 1988 | Manly Sea Eagles | 12 | 2 | 7 | 0 | 22 |
| 1989–90 | Eastern Suburbs | 14 | 4 | 10 | 0 | 36 |
| 1990–91 | Fulham | 20 | 3 | 27 | 0 | 66 |
| | Total | 46 | 9 | 44 | 0 | 124 |

Timothy Dwyer (born 31 May 1963) is an Australian former professional rugby league footballer who played for the Manly Sea Eagles and Eastern Suburbs, and for Barrow and Fulham RLFC in England.

Dwyer, a fullback, played his junior rugby league for the Caloundra Sharks. He is the son of a former mayor of Caloundra City Council, Des Dwyer.

In the 1988 NSWRL season, Dwyer featured in 12 premiership games for Manly. His season ended in round 20 when he had his jaw broken in an accidental collision with Ellery Hanley while under a high kick. Despite the injury he played out the remaining 30 minutes of the game, setting up a try for Matt Burke which proved the difference between the teams.

Dwyer played first-grade for Eastern Suburbs in 1989 and 1990, making eight and six appearances respectively.

He joined English club Fulham for the 1990–91 season.
