= Ferntree Creek National Park =

National park in Australia

- IUCN category II (national park)
- Location within Queensland
- Location: Queensland
- Coordinates: 26°36′19″S 152°57′50″E
- Area: 0.72 km^{2} (0.28 sq mi)
- Established: 1947
- Governing body: Queensland Parks and Wildlife Service

Ferntree Creek is a national park in Queensland, Australia, 97 km north of Brisbane.

50 species of birds were recorded in the park, including the endangered gray goshawk. It is also a refuge for very unusual animals, such as the tusked frog.

The average elevation of the terrain is 57 metres.

== See also ==
- Protected areas of Queensland
