= Sunshine Motorway =

Motorway on the Sunshine Coast, Queensland

Sunshine Motorway Queensland

General information
- Type: Freeway
- Length: 45.3 km (28 mi)
- Route number(s): State Route 70

Major junctions
- South end: Bruce Highway (State Highway M1), Sippy Downs
- Brisbane Road (State Route 6); Maroochydore Road (State Route 8); David Low Way (State Route 6); Yandina Coolum Road (State Route 11)
- North end: Eenie Creek Road, Noosaville

Location(s)
- Major suburbs / towns: Mountain Creek, Maroochydore, Pacific Paradise, Coolum Beach, Peregian Springs, Weyba Downs

Highway system
- Highways in Australia; National Highway • Freeways in Australia; Highways in Queensland

The Sunshine Motorway is a thirty-three kilometre Australian motorway on the Sunshine Coast region of Queensland, just north of Brisbane. It was initially a tolled motorway before these were removed in 1996 after excessive complaints regarding the need of a toll. It is part of State Route 70, which extends north a further 12.3 kilometres to Noosaville.

== Route ==
The Sunshine Motorway is distinctive in that it is considered a low-budget motorway. Moreover, it features a significant change in direction, shifting from an east–west alignment to a north–south orientation at the Nicklin Way interchange. The motorway's journey commences at the interchange with the Bruce Highway at Palmview, proceeding eastward past Sippy Downs and Mountain Creek. There, it intersects with the Nicklin Way and subsequently heads north, ultimately concluding at Emu Mountain Road near Peregian Beach. Due to budget constraints, the majority of traffic on this motorway is confined to a single lane in each direction. However, there are dual carriageway sections from the Bruce Highway to Kawana Way and from the Nicklin Way to the Mudjimba/David Low Way exit. Notable towns along the motorway a include Mooloolaba and Maroochydore, both renowned as popular holiday destinations.

To address the growing demands on the Sunshine Coast, the Queensland State Government has committed substantial funding for the duplication of various sections of the Sunshine Motorway. The most recent upgrade, completed in 2008, also involved the enhancement of Maroochydore Road.

== History ==
Early Development and Construction

The inception of the Sunshine Motorway dates back to the late 1980s when the need for improved transportation infrastructure in the Sunshine Coast region became increasingly apparent. The population was on the rise, and there was a growing demand for efficient road connections to support not only local commuting but also the area's thriving tourism industry. To address these pressing concerns, the Queensland Government embarked on the planning and construction of a new motorway.

Stage One: Bruce Highway to Pacific Paradise (1990)

The first phase of the Sunshine Motorway, which spanned from the interchange with the Bruce Highway at Palmview to Pacific Paradise, was officially opened on 20 January 1990. This inaugural segment marked a significant step forward in improving regional transportation. It was noteworthy for being a completely grade-separated motorway, which means it featured overpasses and underpasses to ensure uninterrupted traffic flow, a feature relatively uncommon for low-budget motorways. This section included three toll booths.

Stage Two: Pacific Paradise to Peregian Springs (1993)

Stage Two of the Sunshine Motorway, extending from Pacific Paradise to Peregian Springs, was inaugurated on 29 December 1993. Unlike Stage One, this section did not incorporate toll booths, a decision made in response to the considerable public displeasure with tolls. However, Stage Two presented its own set of challenges, as it passed through two large roundabouts.

As part of this expansion, Emu Mountain Road was realigned and reconstructed to accommodate motorway traffic heading to Eumundi-Noosa, with the project's completion in October 1993. This was an essential step in enhancing the connectivity of the motorway network in the region.

Toll Removal (1996)

The issue of tolls remained a subject of intense debate, and after years of public dissatisfaction, the Queensland Government officially ceased tolling on the midnight of 8 March 1996. The removal of tolls was a significant milestone, allowing for the free flow of traffic and easing the financial burden on road users.

=== Upgrades ===
As the Sunshine Coast's population continues to expand, the motorway experiences heightened pressure, leading to congestion at most interchanges during peak hours. To alleviate this issue, the Department of Transport and Main Roads is presently planning and executing several new motorway sections under the SM2032 initiative. These developments primarily involve upgrading to dual carriageway in densely populated regions traversed by the motorway. Additional construction efforts included the duplication of the Maroochy River Bridge, which was finalised in 2008, and the introduction of various safety measures along the entire motorway length.

By 2010, the entire segment from Mooloolaba to Pacific Paradise had evolved into a four-lane dual-carriageway motorway. Nevertheless, a two-lane section remains between Kawana Way and Nicklin Way, and the section north of Pacific Paradise still features two lanes.

A noteworthy $320 million project is in the planning stage to enhance the intersection of the Sunshine Motorway with the Nicklin Way, slated for construction between 2022 and 2025.

Additionally, in 2021, planning commenced for a 10-kilometre section of the Sunshine Motorway, extending from Pacific Paradise to Coolum Beach, with the aim of converting it from two lanes to four. A budget of $1.75 million was allocated for this planning initiative.

Furthermore, a project to prepare for a future upgrade of the interchange to Maroochy Boulevard, with an estimated cost of $1.6 million, was expected to be completed by late 2022.

== Major intersections ==
The Sunshine Motorway does not meet motorway standard specifications. Rather, it functions as an inter-urban road with numerous intersections, varying in significance depending on the measurement criteria applied. In addition to the 11 intersections listed below, there are approximately six more.

LGA	Location	km	mi	Destinations	Notes
Sunshine Coast	Sippy Downs / Tanawha border	0	0.0		
Sunshine Coast	Sippy Downs / Buderim / Mountain Creek border	4.2– 5.1	2.6– 3.2	Kawana Way – east – Parrearra	
Sunshine Coast	Mountain Creek	7.6– 8.6	4.7– 5.3	Brisbane Road (State Route 6) – north – Mooloolaba / south–east – Minyama	
Sunshine Coast	Mooloolaba / Buderim border	9.8– 10.6	6.1– 6.6	Mooloolaba Road – north–east – Alexandra Headland / south–west – Buderim	No northbound entry
Sunshine Coast	Buderim / Maroochydore border	11.3– 12.5	7.0– 7.8	Maroochy Boulevard – north – Maroochydore CBD / south – Buderim	
Sunshine Coast	Buderim / Maroochydore / Kuluin border	13.3– 14.5	8.3– 9.0	Maroochydore Road – north–east – Maroochydore CBD / west – Kunda Park	
Sunshine Coast	Maroochydore	15.3– 15.9	9.5– 9.9	Bradman Avenue (State Route 6) – east – Maroochydore CBD / west – Diddillibah	
Maroochy River		16.0– 16.3	9.9– 10.1	Maroochy River Bridge	
Sunshine Coast	Pacific Paradise	18.0– 20.2	11.2– 12.6	David Low Way (State Route 6) – east – Mudjimba / west – Bli Bli	
Sunshine Coast	Pacific Paradise	18.8– 20.2	11.7– 12.6	North Shore Connection Road – east – Mudjimba, and Sunshine Coast Airport	
Sunshine Coast	Coolum Beach	28.3	17.6	Yandina–Coolum Road (State Route 11) – east – Coolum Beach CBD / west – Yandina	
Sunshine Coast	Peregian Springs	31.2	19.4	Ridges Boulevard	Northbound exit and southbound entrance only.
Sunshine Coast	Peregian Springs	33.0	20.5	Emu Mountain Road – east – Peregian Beach / Peregian Springs Drive – west – Peregian Springs CBD	Name changes to Emu Mountain Road
Sunshine Coast	Weyba Downs	41.1	25.5	Emu Mountain Road – west – Doonan / Eumarella Road – east – Weyba Downs CBD	Name changes to Walter Hay Drive
Noosa	Noosaville	45.3	28.1	Eenie Creek Road – west – Noosaville CBD / east – Sunshine Beach	Northern end of State Route 70. Walter Hay Drive continues north–west to Eumundi–Noosa Road (State Route 12)
1.000 mi = 1.609 km; 1.000 km = 0.621 mi: Incomplete access; Route transition

== See also ==
- Freeways in Australia
- Freeways in Sunshine Coast
