= David Low Way =

Road in Queensland, Australia

David Low Way Queensland
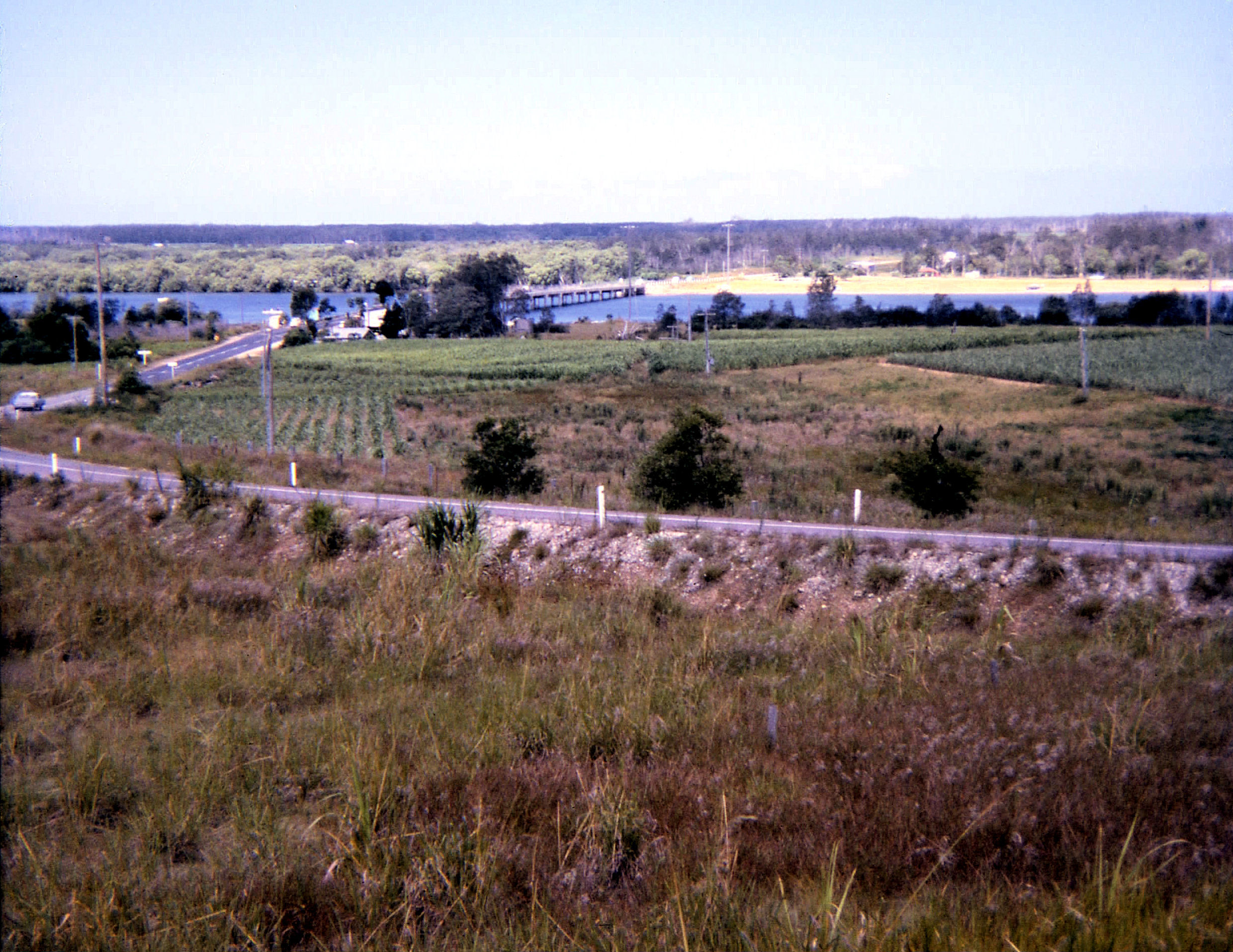
- David Low Way, 1966

General information
- Type: Road
- Length: 36 km (22 mi)
- Route number(s): State Route 6; (Maroochydore – Noosa Heads)

Major junctions
- South end: Bradman Avenue, (State Route 6), Maroochydore, Queensland
- Bli Bli Road (State Route 10); Sunshine Motorway (State Route 70); Yandina Coolum Road (State Route 11)
- North end: Sunshine Beach Road, (State Route 6), Noosa Heads, Queensland

Location(s)
- Major suburbs: Maroochydore, Bli Bli, Pacific Paradise, Marcoola, Mount Coolum, Coolum, Peregian Beach, Marcus Beach, Sunshine Beach, Noosa Heads

David Low Way is a 36-kilometre (22 mi) Australian road connecting the many coastal townships of the Sunshine Coast with the two large city centres of Maroochydore in the south and Noosa Heads in the north. The route is an alternative coastal route to the Sunshine Motorway and passes through the sugar and fruit growing town of Bli Bli crossing the David Low Bridge over the Maroochy River and then crosses the Sunshine Motorway. The road then travels north along the coast, through many coastal towns to the terminus at Noosa Heads.

It is named after David Low, a local Member of the Queensland Legislative Assembly. The first stage of the road was opened between Sunshine Beach and Peregian Beach on April 2, 1960, by the Queensland Premier of the time, Frank Nicklin.

== Upgrade ==
=== Cycle facility ===
A project to provide a cycle facility at Marcoola and Mudjimba, at a cost of $5.7 million, was partially completed in December 2020, with another stage to follow.

== Major intersections ==
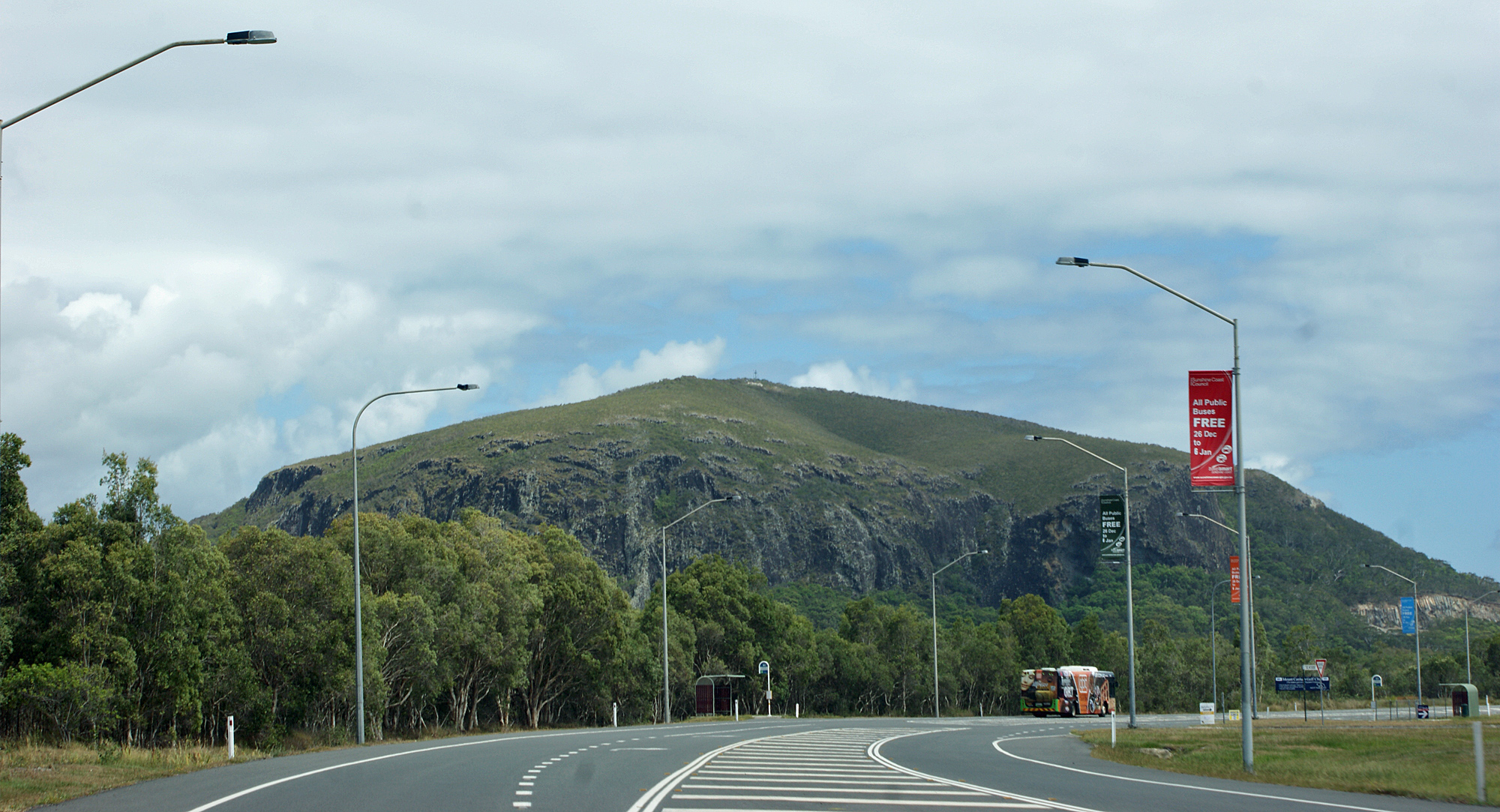
View of Mount Coolum from David Low Way at Mount Coolum, 2015

LGA	Location	km	mi	Destinations	Notes
Sunshine Coast	Maroochydore	0	0.0	Bradman Avenue (State Route 6) – south–east – Maroochydore CBD / Fishermans Road – south – Kuluin and Buderim	South–eastern end of David Low Way (State Route 6); State Route 6 continues south to Caloundra and then west to the Bruce Highway (M1) and on to Woodford
Sunshine Coast	Diddillibah	2.1	1.3	Petrie Creek Road – north–west – Nambour	
Sunshine Coast	Bli Bli	3.5	2.2	Nambour–Bli Bli Road (State Route 10) – north–west – Nambour	
Sunshine Coast	Pacific Paradise	6.8	4.2	Sunshine Motorway (State Route 70) – north – Coolum Beach / south – Mooloolaba	
Sunshine Coast	Pacific Paradise	7.4	4.6	Ocean Drive – south–east – Twin Waters	
Sunshine Coast	Pacific Paradise	8.5	5.3	Mudjimba Beach Road – east – Mudjimba	
Sunshine Coast	Mudjimba	8.9	5.5	North Shore Connection Road – west – Sunshine Motorway	
Sunshine Coast	Coolum Beach	19.5	12.1	Yandina–Coolum Road (State Route 11) – west – Sunshine Motorway, Bruce Highway (M1) and Yandina	
Sunshine Coast	Coolum Beach	23.3	14.5	Emu Mountain Road – west – Sunshine Motorway and Peregian Springs	
Noosa	Sunshine Beach	34.0	21.1	Eenie Creek Road – west – Noosaville	
Noosa	Noosa Heads	36.0	22.4	Sunshine Beach Road (State Route 6) – north–west – Noosa Heads CBD	North–western end of David Low Way. State Route 6 continues to Cooroy and Bruce Highway (M1)
1.000 mi = 1.609 km; 1.000 km = 0.621 mi
