= Pacific Paradise, Queensland =

Pacific Paradise
- Suburb
- Interactive map of Pacific Paradise
- Coordinates: 26.6233°S 153.0727°E
- Country: Australia
- State: Queensland
- City: Maroochydore
- LGA: Sunshine Coast Region
- Location: 8.4 km (5.2 mi) NW of Maroochydore; 107 km (66 mi) N of Brisbane

Government
  - State electorates: Maroochydore; Ninderry
  - Federal division: Fairfax

Area
  - Total: 4.2 km^{2} (1.6 sq mi)

Population
  - Total: 2,675 (2021 census)
  - Density: 637/km^{2} (1,650/sq mi)
- Time zone: UTC+10:00 (AEST)
- Postcode: 4564
- County: Canning
- Parish: Maroochy
Suburbs around Pacific Paradise
Marcoola	Marcoola	Mudjimba
Bli Bli	Pacific Paradise	Twin Waters
Bli Bli	Maroochydore	Twin Waters

Pacific Paradise is a suburb of Maroochydore in the Sunshine Coast Region, Queensland, Australia. In the 2021 census, Pacific Paradise had a population of 2,675 people.

== Geography ==
Pacific Paradise is bounded to the south by the Maroochy River, to the south-west by the Sunshine Motorway, to the north-east by Finland Road, to the north loosely by the North Shore Connection Road.

The suburb is part of the Maroochydore urban centre and is located 8.4 kilometres (5.2 mi) by road north of Maroochydore CBD via the Sunshine Motorway.

The residential areas are in the north-east of the suburb (26.61810°S 153.0779°E) with the remainder of the suburb being undeveloped land, either used for farming or unused because it is marshland.

== History ==
Thousands of years before European occupancy, the north shore of the Maroochy River was the land resource area of the Toombra clan of the Undanbi people. They educated their children in matters relating to sustenance and preservation of culture. Using the natural landscape as a schoolroom, skills and knowledge were acquired by observation and through tutoring by their elders.

Europeans commenced to occupy the land from the 1880s but no provisions were made for establishing a school. Selectors among whom were William Harry Baker, William Parsons, Amos Wickerson and William Godfrey purchased Crown land to free range cattle and horses as well as growing citrus crops. In the 1890s two children, Eleanor May and Harry Searle, were born to the Baker family who owned Portion 102V, Parish of Maroochy, County of Canning (the location of Pacific Paradise State School today).

Attendance at a school for sixty days in a year had become compulsory in Queensland in 1875. Some of the children in the area in the late 1880s were aged between six and twelve years, but because their parents lived more than 3 miles (4.8 km) from the nearest school, the children were exempted from attending school. However one family, the Peatlings, sent their youngest son Frederick John, 6 miles (9.7 km) to the Diddillibah Provisional School that opened in 1885. Other children were either taught at home by their parents or did not receive any schooling. Many of the families suffered great hardship from a flood of the Maroochy River in 1893. The site of the present-day Pacific Paradise State School was 5 feet (1.5 m) under water.

The initial phase of urbanisation began in the 1950s. Major improvements for access to the area included the David Low Way, the David Low Bridge at Bli Bli, and the Sunshine Coast Airport. The government and private developers saw the potential for seaside resorts.

In March 1959 the chairman of Maroochy Shire Council, Arthur Low, proposed to Jack Pizzey, the Queensland Minister for Education, that sites for future schools should be acquired in the area. The District Inspector of Schools investigated and recommended land in the north-west corner of Portion 598, Parish of Maroochy as a site to be reserved for school purposes.

By the 1980s, the areas now Mudjimba, Marcoola and Pacific Paradise had become medium-density residential areas with a further major development of 250 acres (100 ha) planned as the Maroochy Woods Estate and Maroochy Waters Estate in addition to a development of 87 lots in the Suncoast Estate at Marcoola. In 1982 Gordon Simpson, the state government member for Cooroora, recognised the necessity for a school to cater for the growing population. However, the Queensland Education Department claimed there would be only 86 children which was insufficient to erect a primary school and claimed that the school reserve was "half low-lying tea-tree swamp" and not adequate for school facilities.

In 1986, there was overcrowding at Bli Bli State School with 488 children enrolled, necessitating a new school. Architects, Microvitch & Microvitch, designed a campus similar to one at Morayfield East State School in which the facilities of a preschool were integrated with those of a primary school Grade 1. The school complex was built over a period of five months. The buildings were single-storey on a concrete slab.

The area was officially named Pacific Paradise on 27 July 1991. The school was officially named Pacific State School on 3 December 1991.

On 28 January 1992, Pacific Paradise State School was officially opened with 370 students in the main school with a further 50 pre-schoolers.

== Demographics ==
In the 2016 census, Pacific Paradise had a population of 2,190 people.

In the 2021 census, Pacific Paradise had a population of 2,675 people.

== Education ==
Pacific Paradise State School is a government primary (Prep–6) school for boys and girls at 14–24 Menzies Drive (26.6142°S 153.0793°E). In 2017, the school had an enrolment of 563 students with 44 teachers (37 full-time equivalent) and 25 non-teaching staff (16 full-time equivalent). It includes a special education program.

There are no secondary schools in Pacific Paradise. The nearest government secondary school is Maroochydore State High School in Maroochydore to the south.

== Amenities ==
The Sunshine Coast Regional Council operates a mobile library service which visits Lerner Street.
