= Marcoola, Queensland =

Marcoola
- Town
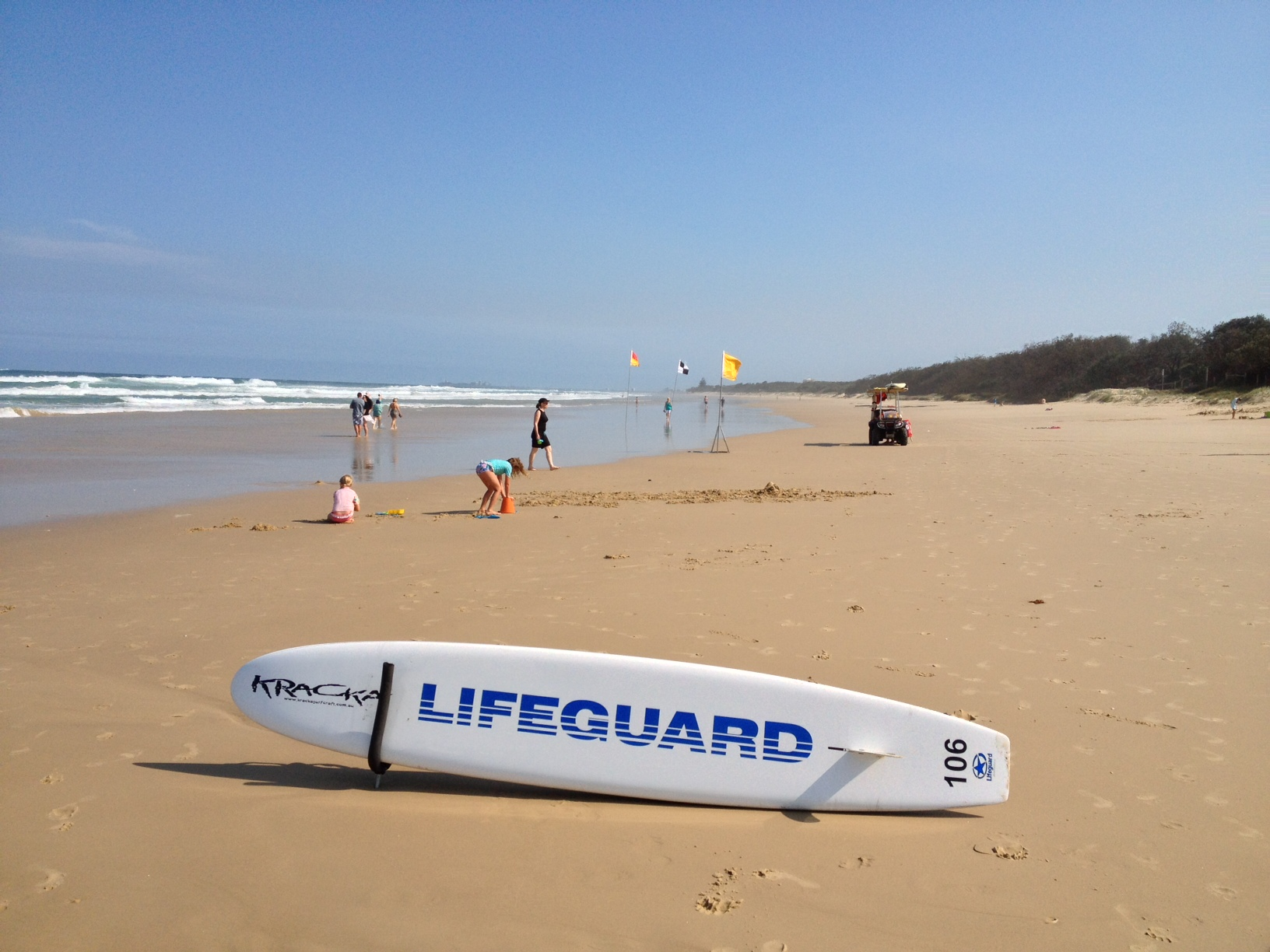
- Marcoola Beach

- Interactive map of Marcoola
- Coordinates: 26.5833°S 153.0955°E
- Country: Australia
- State: Queensland
- LGA: Sunshine Coast Region
- Location: 13.3 km (8.3 mi) N of Maroochydore; 113 km (70 mi) N of Brisbane

Government
  - State electorates: Maroochydore; Ninderry
  - Federal division: Fairfax

Area
  - Total: 13.7 km^{2} (5.3 sq mi)

Population
  - Total: 3,355 (2021 census)
  - Density: 244.9/km^{2} (634.3/sq mi)
- Time zone: UTC+10:00 (AEST)
- Postcode: 4564
Localities around Marcoola
Maroochy River	Mount Coolum	Coral Sea
Bli Bli	Marcoola	Coral Sea
Bli Bli	Pacific Paradise	Mudjimba

Marcoola is a coastal town and locality in the Sunshine Coast Region, Queensland, Australia. In the 2021 census, the locality of Marcoola had a population of 3,355 people.

== Geography ==
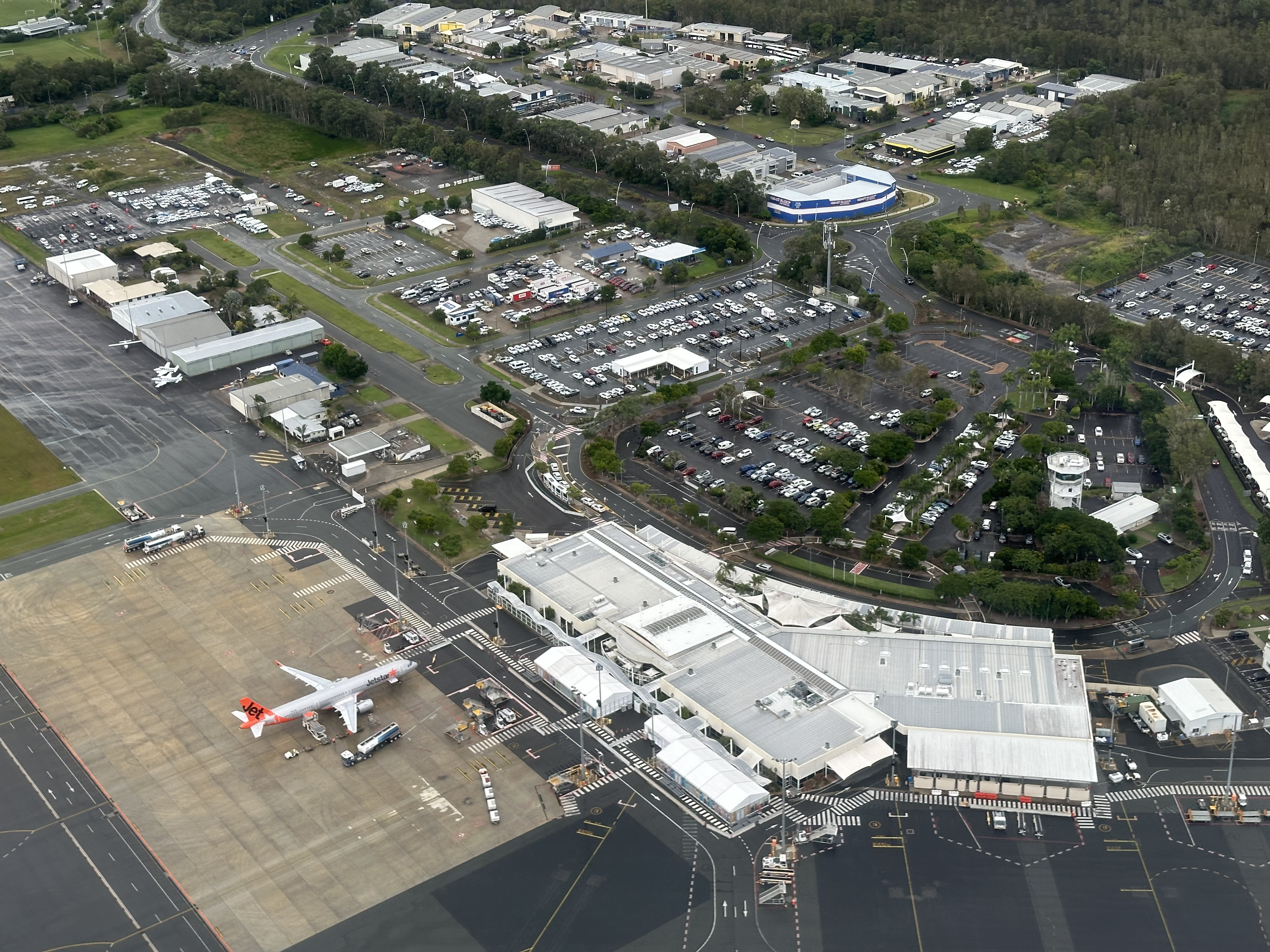
Aerial view of Sunshine Coast Airport, 2024

The locality is bounded to the east by the Coral Sea and to the west by the Maroochy River, forming part of the Maroochy River Catchment Area. The town is in the north-east corner of the locality. The eastern coastline is a long sandy strip known as Marcoola Beach (26.5958°S 153.0977°E).

Sunshine Coast Airport is located within the south of the locality on Friendship Avenue, off Airport Drive (26.5930°S 153.0829°E).

There are two sections of Mount Coolum National Park within the locality, one in the north of the locality and one in the south. A section of the Maroochy Wetlands Conservation Park is in the south-west of the locality adjacent to the river (26.6046°S 153.0553°E).

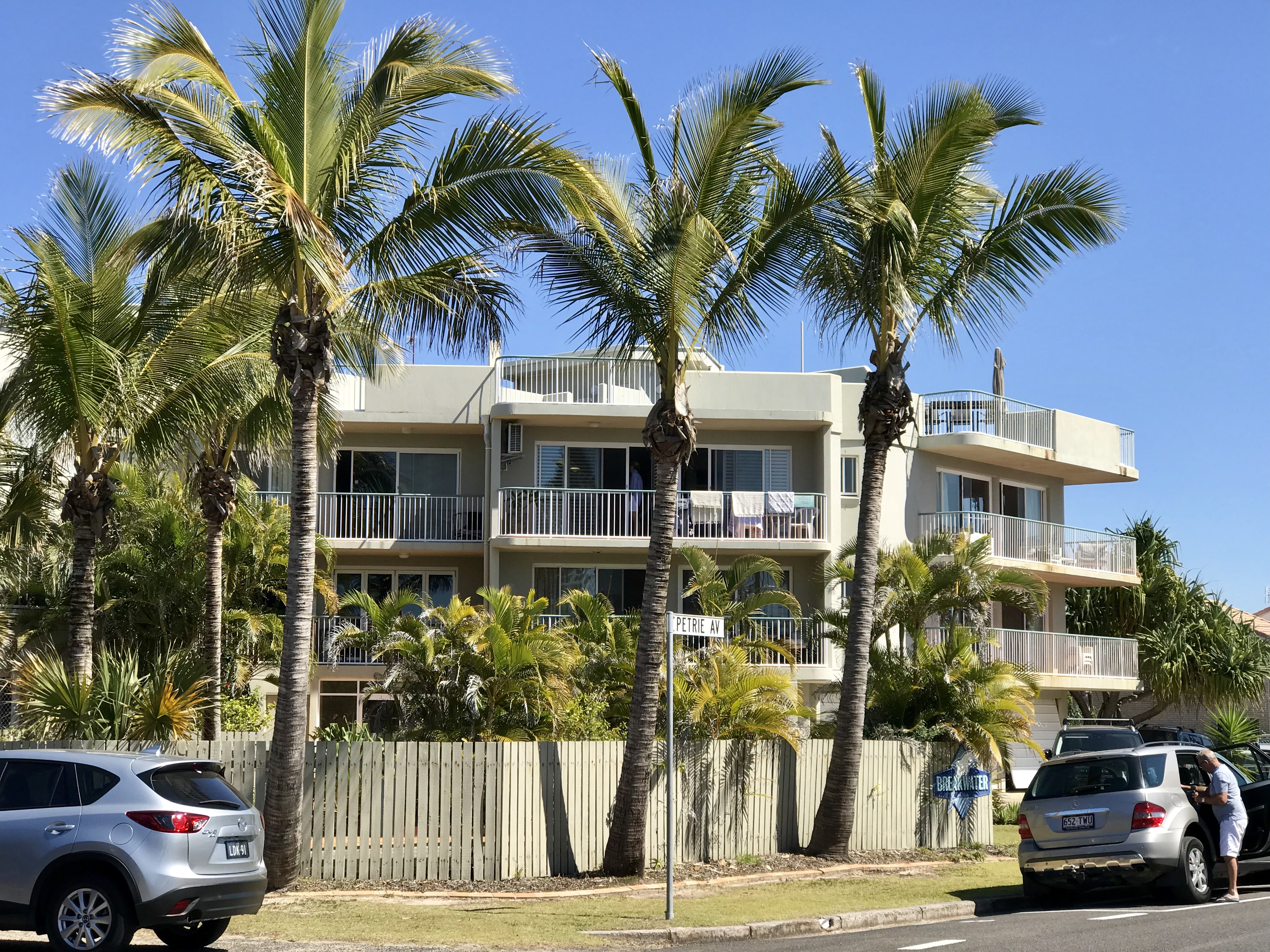
Residential apartments on the Esplanade, 2018

The Sunshine Motorway enters the locality from the south (Pacific Paradise) and proceeds north (through the west of the locality), exiting the locality to the north (Mount Coolum). It provides a route through the locality, but not access to it. The David Low Way enters the locality from the south-east (Mudjimba) and forms part of the south-east boundary of the locality before proceeding north (through the east of the locality), exiting to the north (Mount Coolum). It provides the main access to the locality.

Land use in Marcoola is mixed. Along the eastern coastal area, the land use is predominantly sububan residential blocks and larger holiday accommodation facilities. The west of the locality is farmland, predominantly used for crop growing (mostly sugarcane). There is a commercial and industrial area in the south of the locality near the airport, as well as protected areas of national parks and conservation parks.

== History ==
The name Marcoola was a coined name and reflects its location between Maroochydore and Coolum.

Maroochy Airport was opened in Marcoola on 12 August 1961. It was changed in 1997 to its official name the Sunshine Coast Airport.

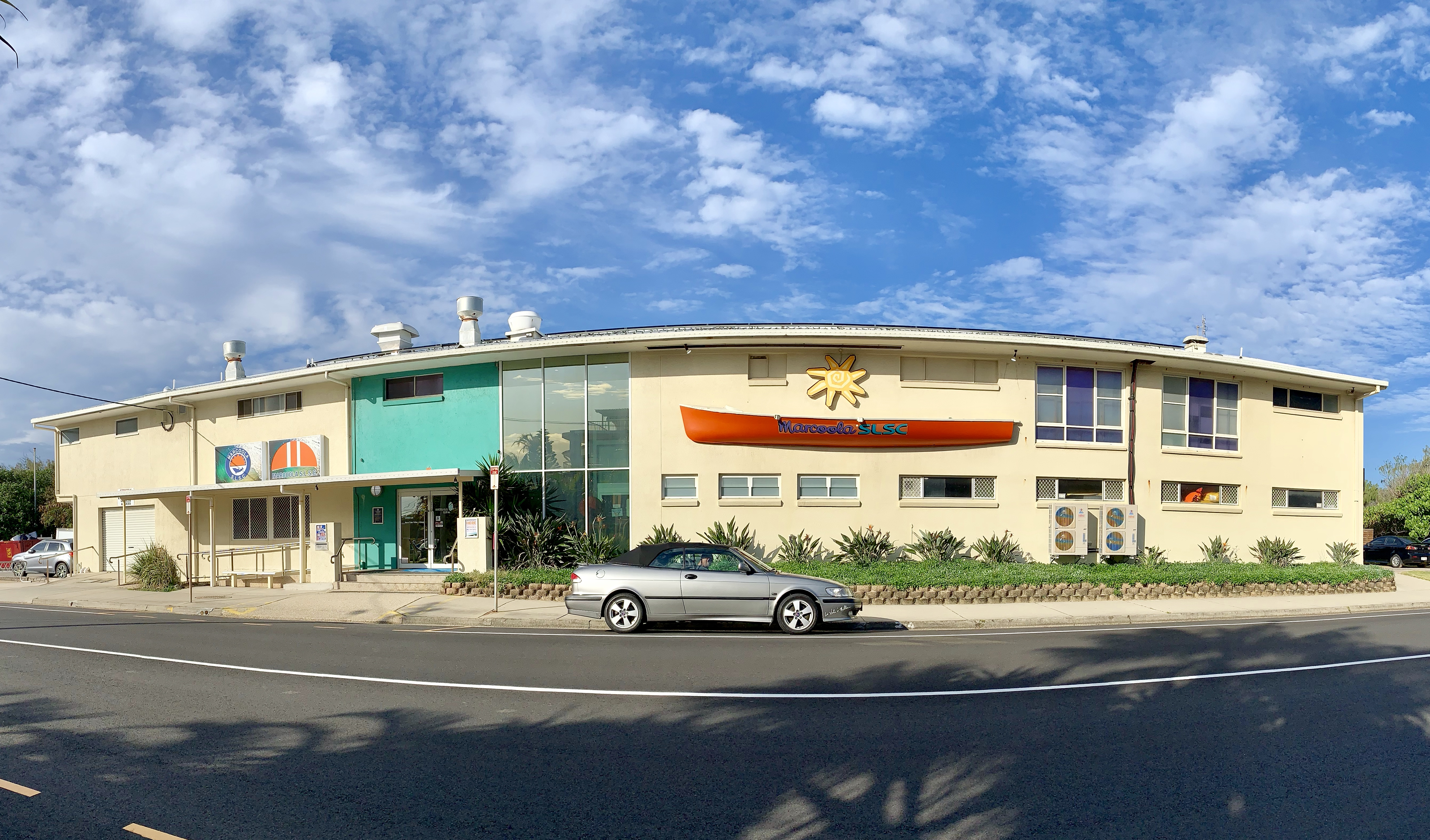
Marcoola Surf Life Saving Club, 2019

The Marcoola Beach Surf Lifesaving Club was founded in 1969 commencing with a "nipper" group (younger boys). The first clubhouse was built in 1970. In 1979, the club introduced a "nipperette" group (younger girls). At that time, women were not accepted into surf life saving clubs and the club was reprimanded; however, in 1980, surf life saving became open to women at all levels. In 1984, the current 2-storey clubhouse was opened.

In March 2009, a ship called, MV Pacific Adventurer, spilled 270 tonnes of oil off the coast of Brisbane causing damage to the Marcoola coastline among other areas and costing the state millions of dollars.

== Demographics ==
In the 2016 census, the locality of Marcoola had a population of 3,173 people, of which 50.4% were male and 49.6% were female. Aboriginal and/or Torres Strait Islander people made up 2.6% of the population.

In the 2021 census, the locality of Marcoola had a population of 3,355 people with a gender distribution of 50.6% male and 49.4% female, and a median age of 45 years. Additionally, 2.9% of the population identified as Indigenous.

== Education ==
There are no schools in Marcoola. The nearest government primary schools are Pacific Paradise State School in neighbouring Pacific Paradise to the south and Coolum State School in Coolum Beach to the north. The nearest government secondary schools are Maroochydore State High School in Maroochydore to the south and Coolum State High School in Coolum Beach to the north.

== Amenities ==
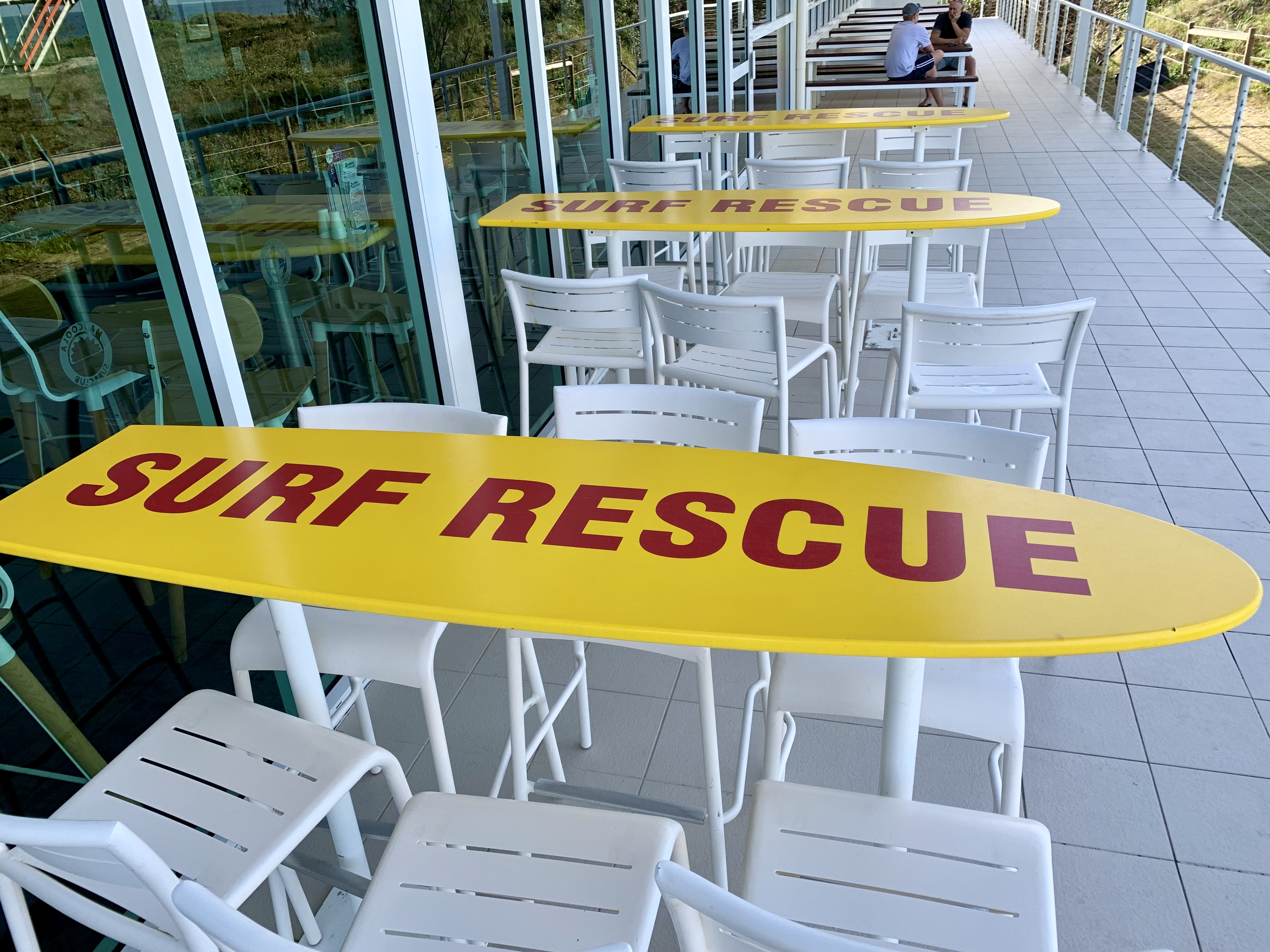
Outdoor dining at the Marcoola Surf Life Saving Club, 2019

Marcoola Surf Life Saving Club is at 64 Marcoola Esplanade (26.5826°S 153.0971°E). The club trains volunteers to patrol local beaches to ensure people have a safe swimming experience. The club's dining facilities provide financial support for life saving services.

== Environment ==
Many species persist in this region, including flora such as paperbark open forest and woodland, Banksia aemula (wallum banksia) woodland, and open heathland. There is also a population of the endangered Mount Emu she-oak.

The region provides essential habitat for ground parrots which are regularly recorded and it is believed a subpopulation between 15 and 19 birds exists in Marcoola, making this the largest subpopulation within the Sunshine Coast and consequently important for the species persistence. Many other popular bird species have also been recorded in the area in recent years.

Ecosystem services in the region contribute to improved water quality of the Maroochy River by removing nutrient loads, retaining floodwaters and maintaining local flows before flowing directly into the sea. Other benefits include the high value to wildlife and by providing habitat refuge. The area also provides critical habitat for species which rely on the area for breeding and feeding (such as acid frogs, the 'vulnerable' wallum froglet, wallum sedge frog, wallum rocketfrog).

Marcoola coastal region is part of the Australian Commonwealth's, Temperate East Marine Region, and consists of several 'nationally important wetlands' and 'protected area' locations.
