= Cooloolabin Dam =

Dam in Queensland, Australia

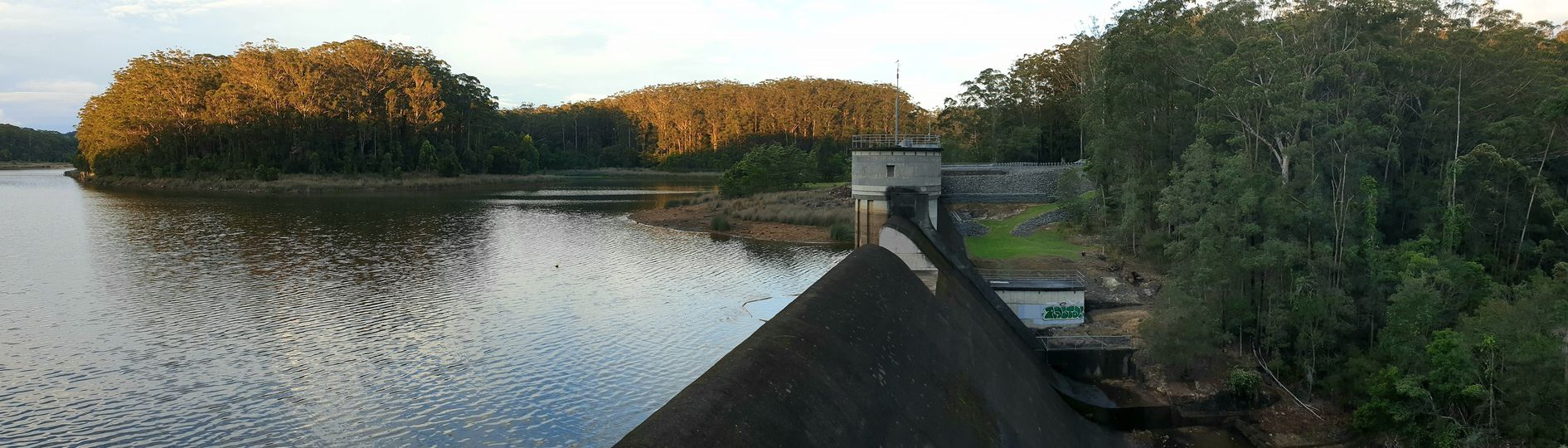
- The dam in 2021

- Location of the dam in Queensland
- Interactive map of Cooloolabin Dam
- Country: Australia
- Location: Nambour, Sunshine Coast, Queensland
- Coordinates: 26°33′01″S 152°52′48″E
- Status: Operational
- Opening date: 1979
- Operator: SEQ Water

Dam and spillways
- Type of dam: Gravity dam
- Impounds: Rocky Creek; part of the South Maroochy River
- Height (foundation): 19 m (62 ft)
- Length: 243 m (797 ft)
- Spillway type: Un-gated and uncontrolled

Reservoir
- Total capacity: 8,183 ML (6,634 acre⋅ft)
- Catchment area: 8.1 km^{2} (3.1 sq mi)
- Surface area: 220 ha (540 acres)

The Cooloolabin Dam is a concrete gravity dam on Rocky Creek located to the west of Yandina on the Sunshine Coast of Queensland, Australia. The dam is located on the headwaters of the South Maroochy River waterway and is a source of potable water for the area.

== Overview ==
The main dam wall is 19 metres (62 ft) high and 243 metres (797 ft) long, and it has five saddle dams that total 1,100 metres (3,600 ft) in length. The dam was completed in 1979 and it created a reservoir with a capacity of 13,600 megalitres (11,000 acre⋅ft). As part of the SEQ Water Dam Improvement Program, a section of the spillway was cut away in 2015 to lower the spillway by 3 metres (9.8 ft), reducing the full supply capacity to 8,183 megalitres (6,634 acre⋅ft).

The spillway is un-gated and uncontrolled and when the reservoir reaches 100 per cent capacity, water flows over the spillway and safely out of the dam. The reservoir overflowed for the first time in 1988.

== See also ==
- List of dams and reservoirs in Australia
