= Mudjimba, Queensland =

Mudjimba
- Suburb
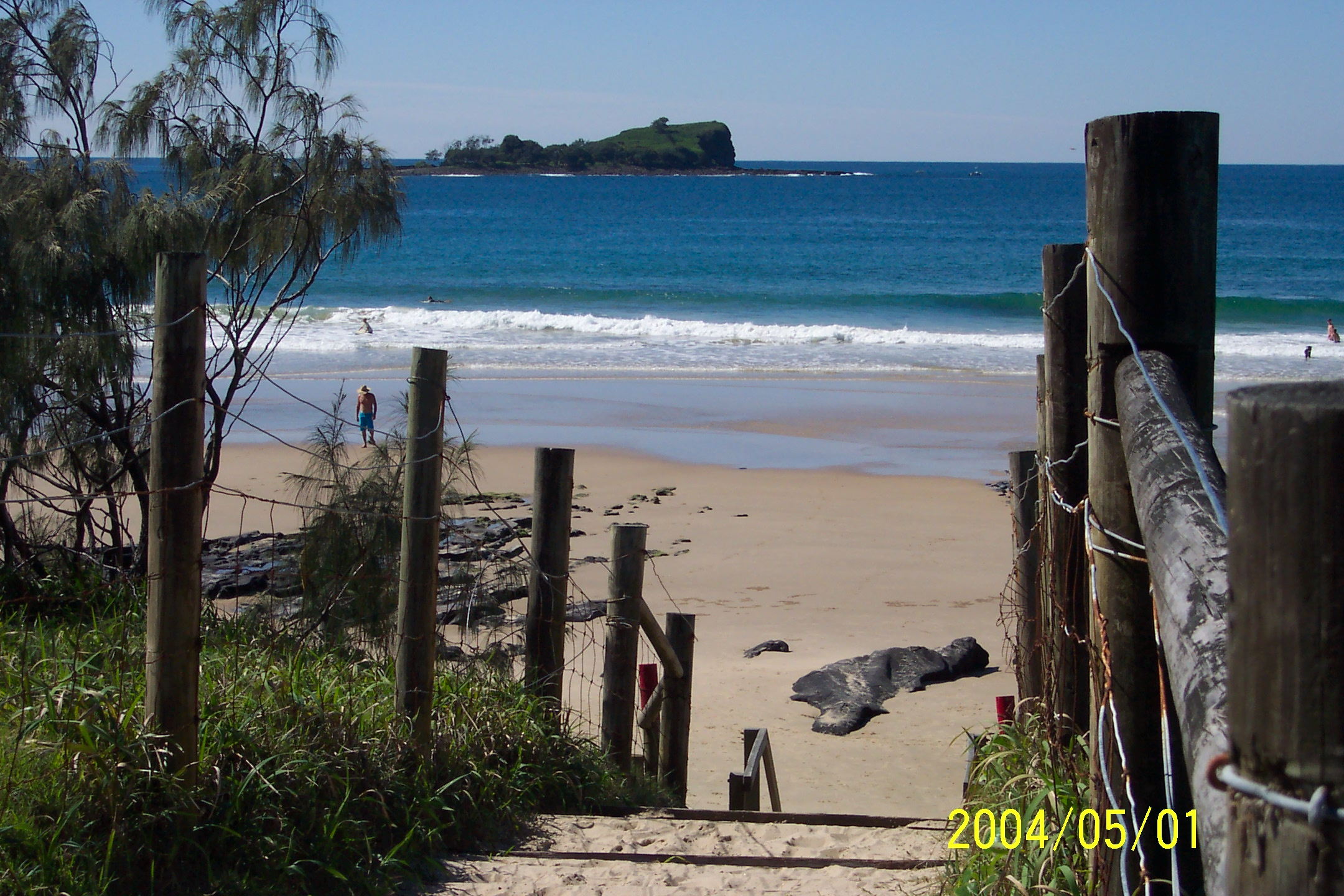
- Mudjimba Island and Mudjimba Beach, 2004

- Interactive map of Mudjimba
- Coordinates: 26.6186°S 153.0925°E
- Country: Australia
- State: Queensland
- City: Sunshine Coast
- LGA: Sunshine Coast Region
- Location: 11.0 km (6.8 mi) N of Maroochydore; 29.6 km (18.4 mi) N of Caloundra; 113 km (70 mi) N of Brisbane CBD

Government
  - State electorate: Maroochydore
  - Federal division: Fairfax

Area
  - Total: 3.2 km^{2} (1.2 sq mi)

Population
  - Total: 2,664 (2021 census)
  - Density: 833/km^{2} (2,160/sq mi)
- Time zone: UTC+10:00 (AEST)
- Postcode: 4564
- County: Canning
- Parish: Maroochy
Suburbs around Mudjimba
Marcoola	Marcoola	Coral Sea
Pacific Paradise	Mudjimba	Coral Sea
Twin Waters	Twin Waters	Coral Sea

Mudjimba is a coastal suburb in the Sunshine Coast Region, Queensland, Australia, and forms part of the Maroochydore urban centre. In the 2021 census, Mudjimba had a population of 2,664 people.

== Geography ==
The suburb is bounded by Mudjimba Beach on the Coral Sea to the east, the David Low Way to the north and north-west, and Ocean Drive to the south.

There are two main residential areas in the suburb, one in the north-east beside the beach and the one along Najoor Road in the west of the suburb. The southern part of the suburb is a protected area within the Maroochy River Conservation Park. There are various small areas of marshland throughout the suburb.

Mudjimba Island sits about 1 kilometre (0.62 mi) off the coast. (26.6147°S 153.1147°E). The island forms part of the suburb and is protected as part of the Maroochy River Conservation Park. The island is known as Old Woman Island, and is associated with an Aboriginal legend of two women who stranded on the island who gathered the Midyam berries as food.

== History ==
The name Mudjimba is derived from the Kabi language word midyim/mudjim for a local plant, the Midyam (Austromyrtus tenuifolia) bush, which has sweet white berries with green spots. The Kabi legend is that two women were stranded on Mudjimba island and gathered the berries as food.

The Mudjimba Residents Association was established on 13 October 1960.

The initial development of the area as a beachside suburb was under the name Surfrider Estate.

Mudjimba Rural Fire Brigade was established in February 1985 with Harry Stuart the first fire warden.

Mudjimba Surf Life Saving Club was founded in 1996.

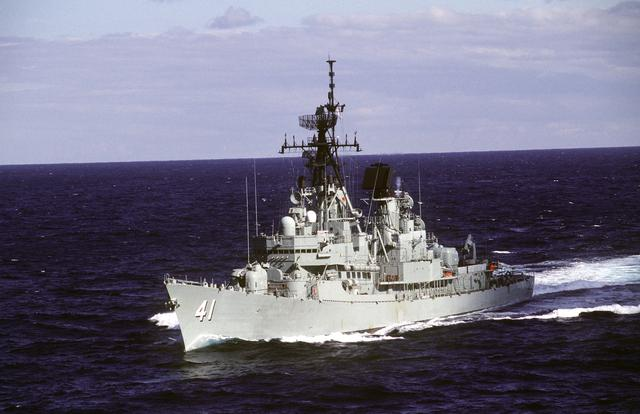
HMAS Brisbane, 1995

In January 2003, the Queensland Government decided to sink the decommissioned HMAS Brisbane off the Sunshine Coast to become an artificial reef and dive site. On 31 July 2005 the ship was scuttled in approximately 2.8 nautical miles (5.2 km; 3.2 mi) off the coast of Mudjimba in 27 metres (89 ft) of water. The ship was filled with 200 to 250 tonnes (200 to 250 long tons; 220 to 280 short tons) of concrete, and 38 small charges were detonated to breach the hull. The ship sank in two minutes and ten seconds, coming to rest with the keel embedded a metre into the seabed and facing the ocean currents, and the uppermost part of the ship 3 metres (9.8 ft) below sea level. A 2009 study of the value of protected areas estimated that the wreck had contributed A$18 million to the Sunshine Coast economy. In July 2010, the Queensland Government was forced to step up patrols of the wreck site because people were illegally using the dive exclusion zone as a fishing site. As part of celebrations for the tenth anniversary of the ship's scuttling, 92.7 MIX FM conducted the world's first live underwater radio broadcast from the wreck on 31 July 2015.

== Demographics ==
In the 2016 census, Mudjimba had a population of 2,540 people.

In the 2021 census, Mudjimba had a population of 2,664 people.

== Education ==
There are no schools in Mudjimba. The nearest government primary school is Pacific Paradise State School in neighbouring Pacific Paradise to the west. The nearest government secondary school is Maroochydore State High School in Maroochydore to the south.

== Transport ==
Sunshine Coast Airport is located adjacent to the suburb. Kinetic Sunshine Coast have a depot near the airport.

Only a small fraction of residents, approximately 0.2%, rely on public transport for their daily commute to work or school, while households typically have an average of 2 vehicles each.

== Amenities ==
Mudjimba Community Hall is 41 Cottonwood Street (26.6188°S 153.0960°E). The hall is operated by the Mudjimba Residents' Association and is available for hire.

Mudjimba Surf Life Saving Club is at 20 Mudjimba Esplanade (26.6148°S 153.1008°E).

Mudjimba Rural Fire Station is at Cottonwood Street (26.6184°S 153.0967°E). The brigade is operated by volunteers.

North Shore Multi Sports Complex and North Shore Community Centre at 701 David Low Way (26.6131°S 153.0849°E). A range of sporting and recreational activities are available.

North Shore Football Club has a soccer field at 53 Nojoor Road (26.6214°S 153.0914°E).

Mudjimba War Memorial is at Power Memorial Park on the foreshore opposite 11 Mudjimba Esplanade (26.6155°S 153.1009°E). The park also has beach access, car parking, barbeque facilities, toilets and a children's playground.

The Mudjimba RSL sub-branch is at 43 Cottonwood Street (26.6193°S 153.0957°E). It coordinates the annual dawn service on Anzac Day at the war memorial.

== Attractions ==
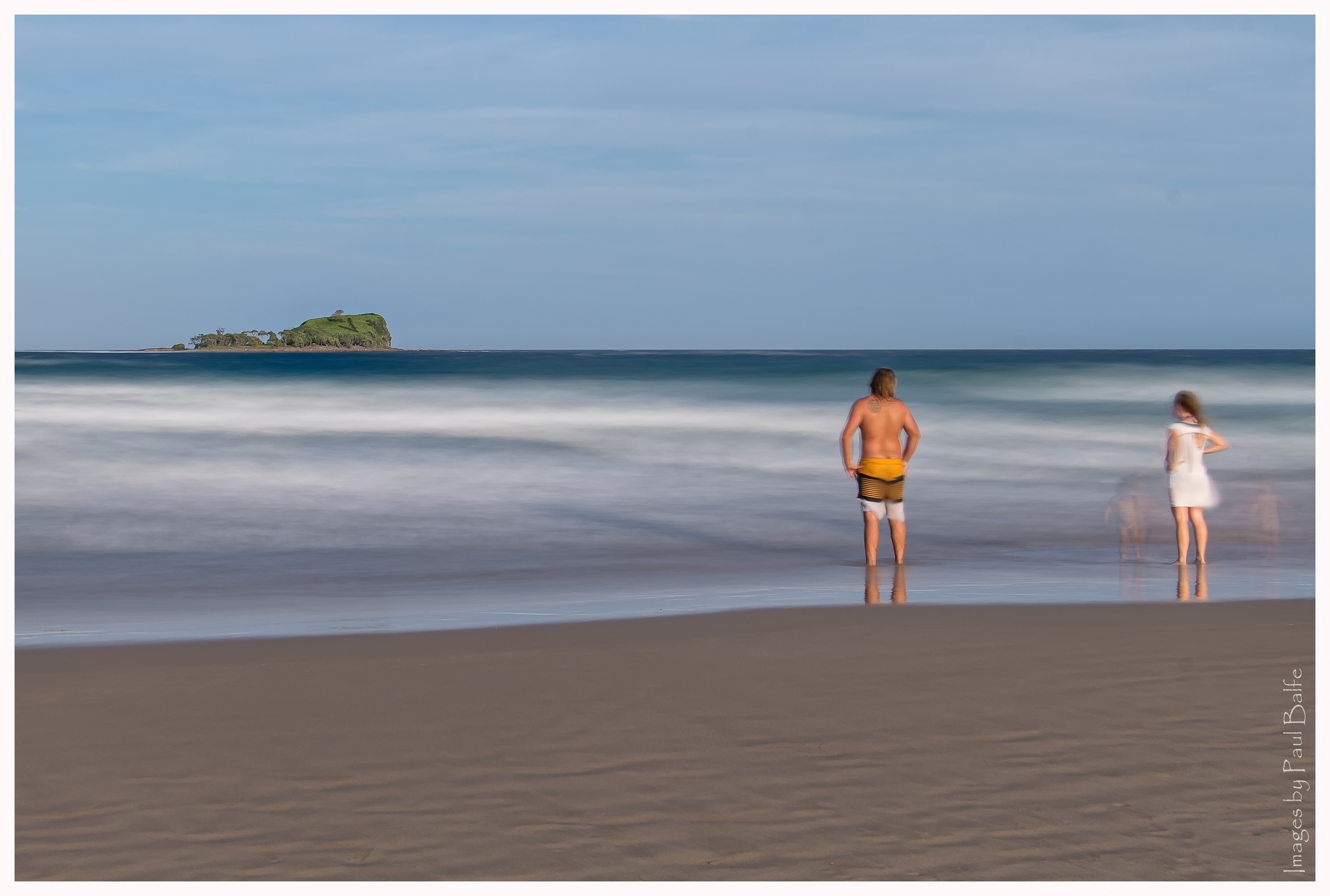
Mudjimba Island seen from Mudjimba Beach, 2018

Although a buffer of coastal bushland has been maintained along the foreshore, Mudjimba Beach (26.6150°S 153.1019°E) can be accessed from Mudjimba Esplanade via a series of paths through the bushland. It is known as a good beach break for surfing. Mudjimba Island is also known as a surfing area but only for expert surfers; a boat is recommended to access the island.

Ex-HMAS Brisbane is a 36.6-hectare (90-acre) dive site (26.6167°S 153.1689°E). The wreck site has been colonised by sponges, soft corals, and hard corals, while over 200 different species of fish have been sighted in the area. It is a restricted access area requiring a dive permit. Commercial dive tours are available and can provide transport, equipment, guides and permits.

A 4-kilometre (2.5 mi) walking track through the Maroochy River Conservation Park commences at Cottonwood Street (corner Coolibah Street, 26.6180°S 153.0973°E. It passes through a variety of natural vegetation types and includes boardwalks and bridges to traverse the paperbark swamp.

The Mudjimba Beach Holiday Park on Cottonwood Street (26.6174°S 153.0990°E) provides cabins and site for caravans and campers.
