= Sunshine Plaza bus station =

Bus station in Queensland, Australia

Maroochydore
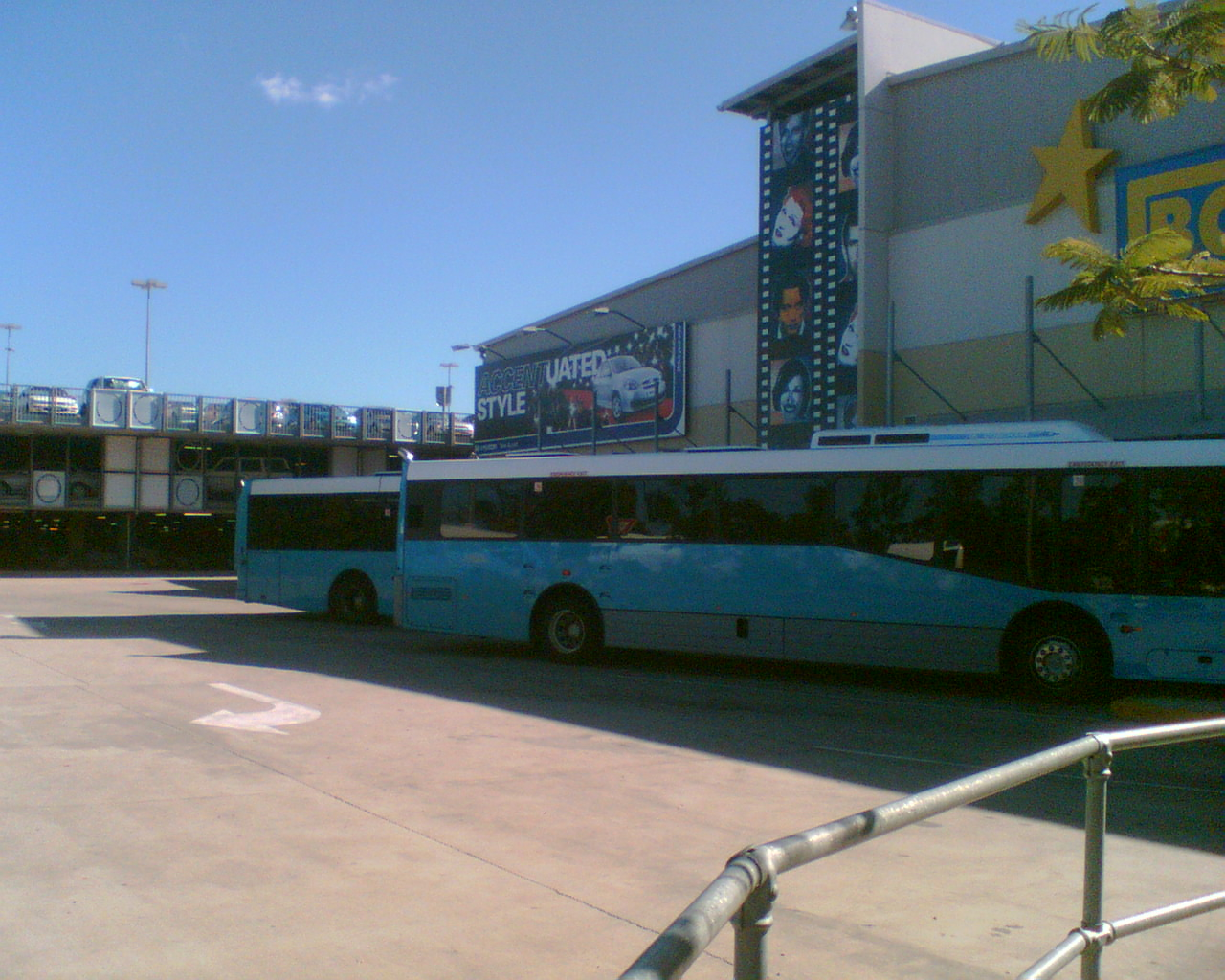

General information
- Location: Horton Parade; Maroochydore, Sunshine Coast
- Coordinates: 26°39′18″S 153°05′25″E

Construction
- Accessible: Yes
Location

Maroochydore is a bus station operated by Translink. It is serviced by Sunbus. It is located on Horton Parade.
