= Twin Waters, Queensland =

Twin Waters
- Suburb
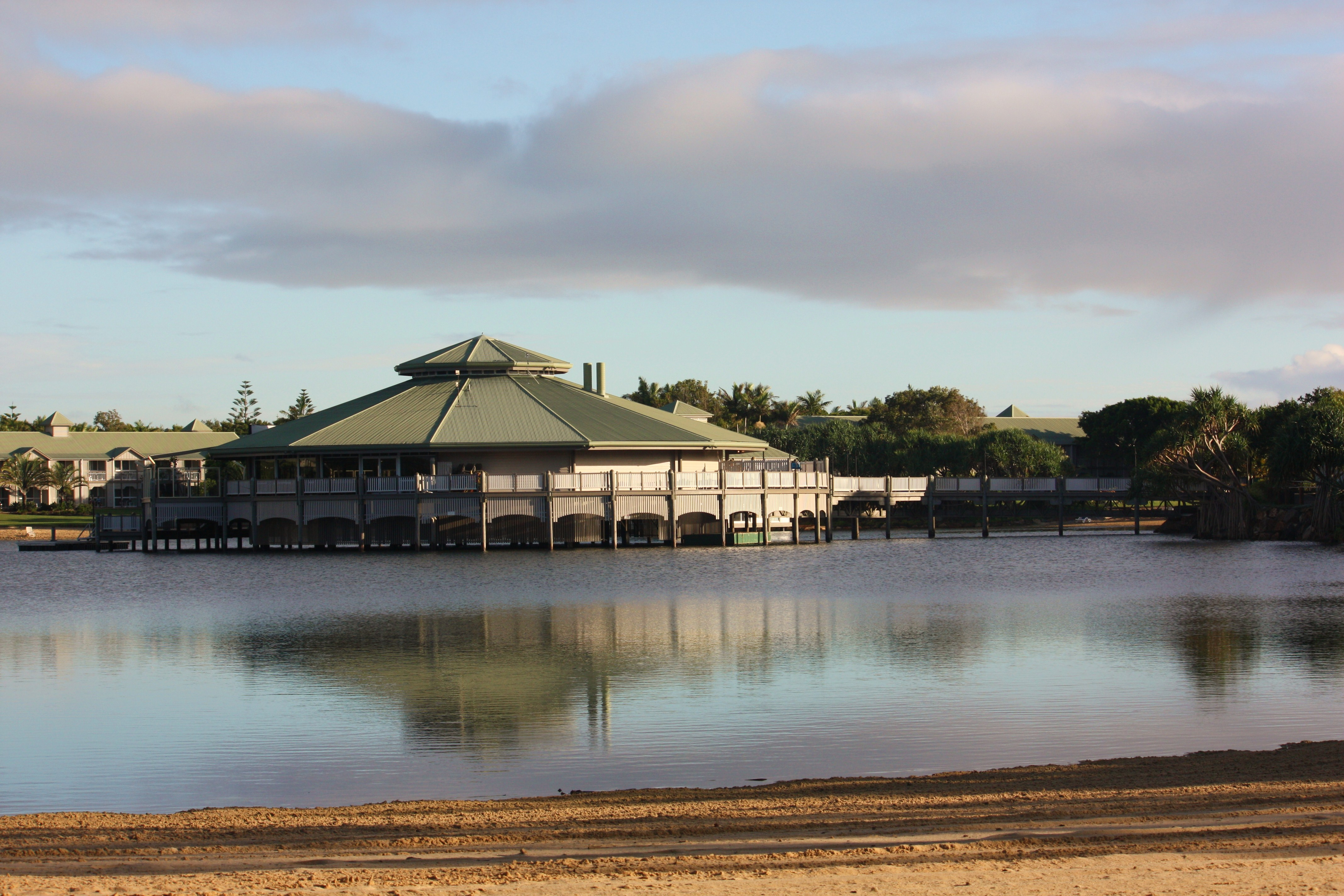
- Lagoon at Twin Waters resort, 2010

- Interactive map of Twin Waters
- Coordinates: 26.6336°S 153.0813°E
- Country: Australia
- State: Queensland
- City: Maroochydore
- LGA: Sunshine Coast Region
- Location: 10.2 km (6.3 mi) N of Maroochydore; 79.0 km (49.1 mi) SE of Gympie; 112 km (70 mi) N of Brisbane

Government
  - State electorate: Maroochydore
  - Federal division: Fairfax

Area
  - Total: 4.6 km^{2} (1.8 sq mi)
- Elevation: 5 m (16 ft)

Population
  - Total: 2,966 (2021 census)
  - Density: 645/km^{2} (1,670/sq mi)
- Time zone: UTC+10:00 (AEST)
- Postcode: 4564
- County: Canning
- Parish: Maroochy
Suburbs around Twin Waters
Pacific Paradise	Mudjimba	Mudjimba
Pacific Paradise	Twin Waters	Coral Sea
Maroochydore	Maroochydore	Maroochydore

Twin Waters is a coastal suburb of Maroochydore in the Sunshine Coast Region, Queensland, Australia. In the 2021 census, Twin Waters had a population of 2,966 people.

== Geography ==
Twin Waters is bounded by the Maroochy River to the south and the Coral Sea to the south-east.

Much of the river frontage is preserved within the Maroochy River Conservation Park (26.6364°S 153.0936°E), which covers 174 hectares (430 acres) is managed primarily for nature conservation.

Due to the L-shape of the suburb, there are three distinct areas: north-west, south-west, and south-east. The south-eastern part of the suburb is predominantly occupied by the conservation park and the Twin Waters Resort (with its own lagoon). The north-west is occupied by the Twin Waters Golf Course with some residential development. The south-west has its own lagoon connected to the Maroochy River and is a mixture of residential development and the conversation park along the river front.

There is a sandy surf beach along the coast with a narrow coastal reserve immediately behind it with a public access road.

== History ==
The Maroochy River Conservation Park was established in 1992.

Twin Waters was originally part of the suburb of Mudjimba and contains a significant canal estate. It was officially named and bounded as a separate suburb on 9 May 2003.

== Demographics ==
In the 2011 census, Twin Waters had a population of 2,542 people.

In the 2016 census, Twin Waters had a population of 2,687 people.

In the 2021 census, Twin Waters had a population of 2,966 people.

== Education ==
There are no schools in the suburb. The nearest government primary school is Pacific Paradise State School in neighbouring Pacific Paradise to the north-west. The nearest government secondary school is Maroochydore State High School in Maroochydore to the south.

== Amenities ==
There is a boat ramp and floating walkway at Nojoor Road on the north bank of Maroochy River (26.6386°S 153.0878°E). It is managed by the Sunshine Coast Regional Council.

== Tourism ==
Twin Waters is directly 8 minutes from the Sunshine Coast Airport. The relaxing residential community is set in tranquil surrounds of local canal estates and a conservation park in direct access to the Maroochy River and its 1.5 km surf-patrolled beach.

=== Attractions ===
The Twin Waters Resort is at 270 Ocean Drive (26.6315°S 153.0971°E). It features 373 rooms situated around a lagoon with conference and reception facilities.

Twin Waters Golf Club is at 151 Ocean Drive (26.6285°S 153.0852°E). It is an 18-hole par-72 championship course. It was designed by champion golfers Peter Thomson and Mike Wolveridge in 1991.
