= Bli Bli, Queensland =

Bli Bli
- Town
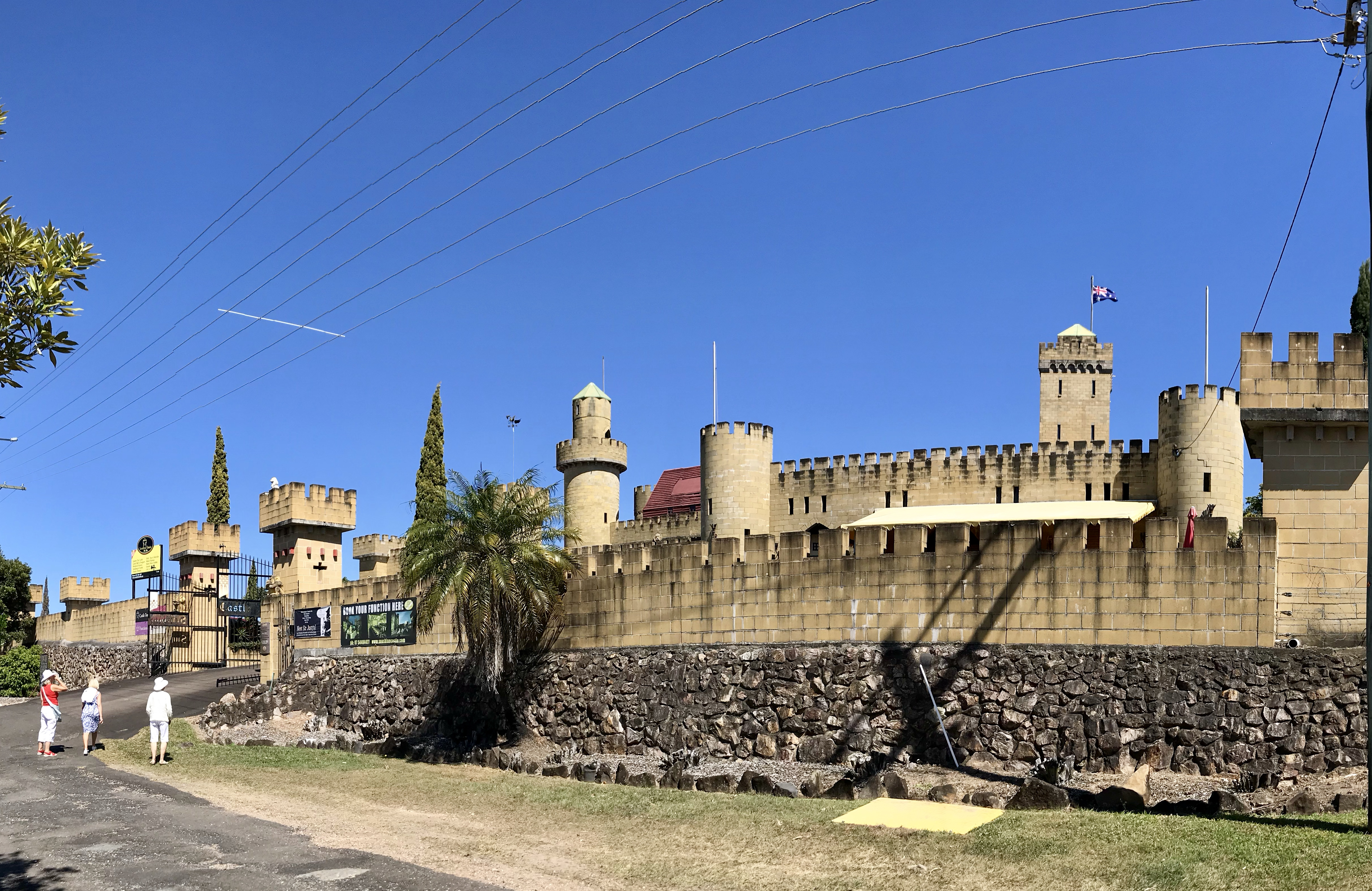
- Sunshine Castle, 2018

- Interactive map of Bli Bli
- Coordinates: 26.6186°S 153.0377°E
- Country: Australia
- State: Queensland
- LGA: Sunshine Coast Region, Division 9
- Location: 8.3 km (5.2 mi) NW of Maroochydore; 9.4 km (5.8 mi) E of Nambour; 29.3 km (18.2 mi) NNW of Caloundra; 108 km (67 mi) N of Brisbane CBD

Government
  - State electorate: Ninderry
  - Federal division: Fairfax

Area
  - Total: 30.0 km^{2} (11.6 sq mi)

Population
  - Total: 10,138 (2021 census)
  - Density: 337.9/km^{2} (875.2/sq mi)
- Time zone: UTC+10:00 (AEST)
- Postcode: 4560
- County: Canning
- Parish: Maroochy
Localities around Bli Bli
Parklands	Maroochy River	Marcoola
Nambour	Bli Bli	Pacific Paradise
Rosemount	Diddillibah	Maroochydore

Bli Bli (/ˈblaɪblaɪ/ BLY-bly) is a rural town and locality in the Sunshine Coast Region, Queensland, Australia. In the 2021 census, the locality of Bli Bli had a population of 10,138 people.

== Geography ==
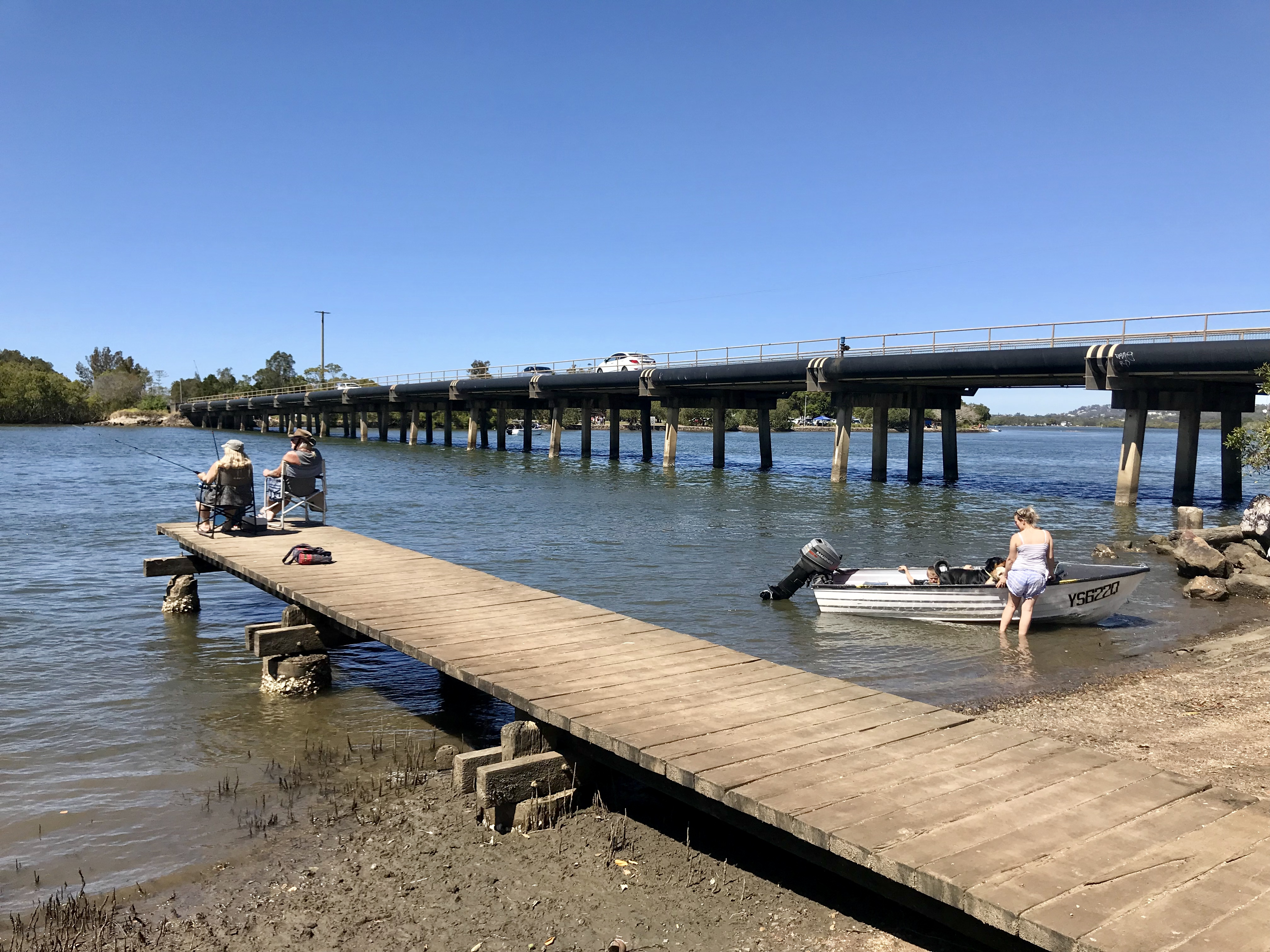
David Low Bridge over Maroochy River in Bli Bli, 2018

A few kilometres inland from the Maroochydore urban area, Bli Bli rises above the wetlands which were, for many years, the home of the Sunshine Coast sugarcane industry. Whilst this industry is all but gone, state government legislation ensures the wetlands will remain an undeveloped Green Space.

The Maroochy River flows through the locality from north-east (Marcoola) to south-east (Pacific Paradise/Maroochydore).

The Bruce Highway forms the south-western boundary of the locality.

The Yandina-Bli Bli Road enters from the north and the Nambour–Bli Bli Road enters from the west.

== History ==
The name Bli Bli is believed to be derived from the Kabi word bilai meaning sheoak tree (Casuarina glauca).

Bli Bli Provisional School opened on 2 April 1901, becoming Bli Bli State School on 1 January 1909.

The first Bli Bli post office opened by March 1903 (a receiving office had been open from 1898) and closed in 1954. The current Bli Bli post office opened on 1 October 1987.

The David Low Bridge over the Maroochy River opened in Bli Bli on 15 August 1959. It was named after David Low, who served as a Member of the Queensland Legislative Assembly and Chairman of the Maroochy Shire Council.

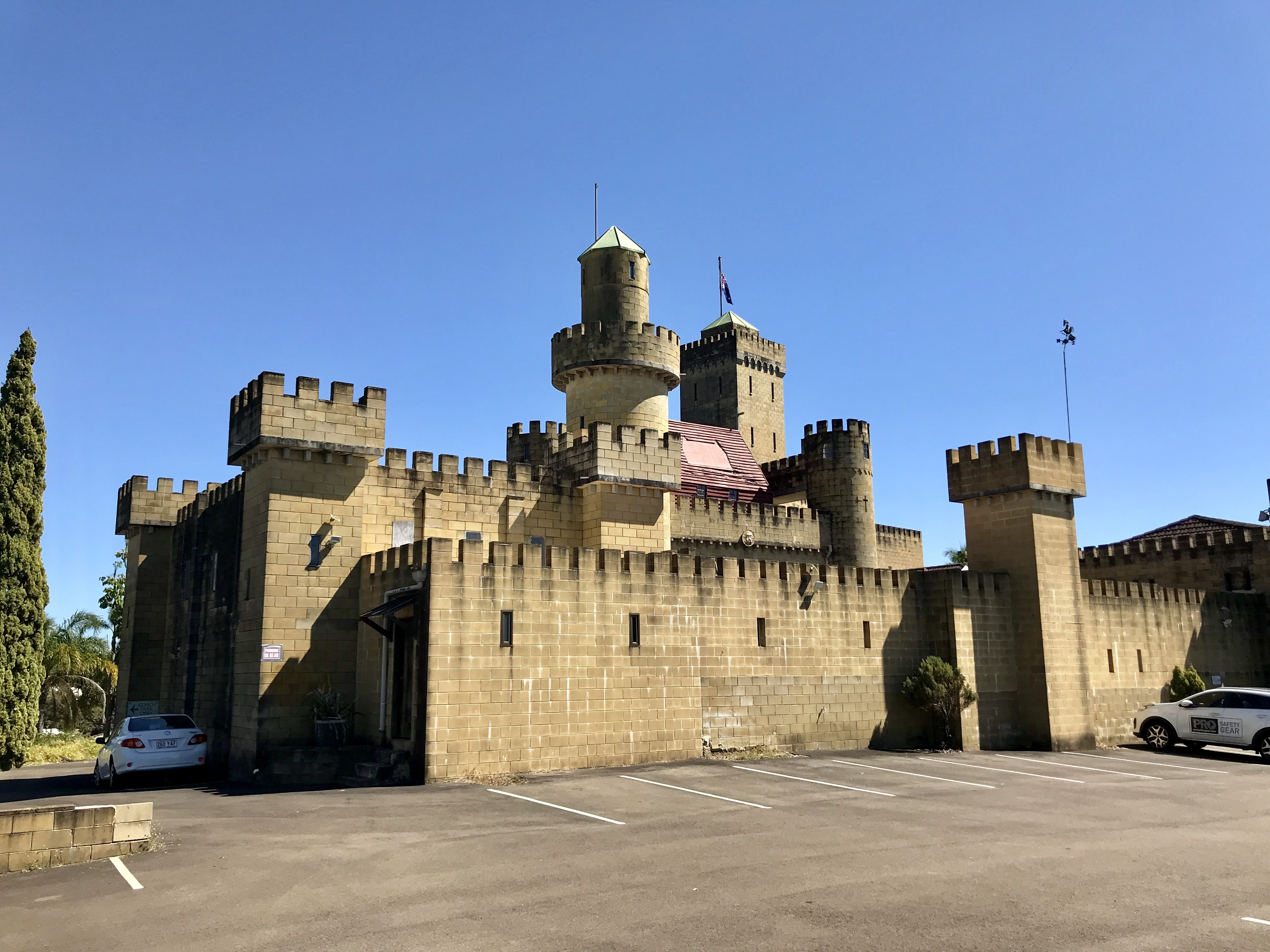
Sunshine Castle

In March 1972, Fairytale Castle was opened; it was later known as the Bli Bli Castle until it was renamed to Sunshine Castle in 2006. The Norman/medieval-style castle was built as a tourist attraction. The castle now houses a medieval museum and serves as an events venue for functions and concerts.

Good Samaritan Catholic College opened in 2017.

== Demographics ==
In the 2011 census, the locality of Bli Bli had a population of 6,283 people, 50.6% female and 49.4% male. The median age of the Bli Bli population was 39 years, compared to the national median age of 37. 79.3% of people living in Bli Bli were born in Australia. The other top responses for country of birth were England 5.4%, New Zealand 4.2%, Scotland 0.7%, Germany 0.7%, South Africa 0.6%. 93.2% of people spoke only English at home; the next most common languages were 0.5% German, 0.4% Italian, 0.2% Tagalog, 0.2% Japanese, 0.1% Dutch.

In the 2016 census, the locality of Bli Bli had a population of 7,801 people.

In the 2021 census, the locality of Bli Bli had a population of 10,138 people.

== Heritage listings ==
Bli Bli has a number of heritage-listed sites, including:

- Bli Bli Public Hall, 87 Willis Road
- former Bli Bli Presbyterian Church, 89 Willis Road

== Education ==
Bli Bli State School is a government primary (Preparatory to Year 6) school for boys and girls at School Road (26.6137°S 153.0319°E). In 2017, the school had an enrolment of 614 students with 45 teachers (35 full-time equivalent) and 29 non-teaching staff (19 full-time equivalent). It includes a special education program.

Good Samaritan Catholic College is a Catholic primary and secondary school (Preparatory to Year 12) for boys and girls at 185 Parklakes Drive (26.5952°S 153.0204°E).

Sunshine Coast Environmental Education Centre is an Outdoor and Environmental Education Centre at Sports Road (26.6065°S 153.0495°E).

There are no government secondary schools in Bli Bli. The nearest government secondary schools are Nambour State College in Nambour to the west and Maroochydore State High School in neighbouring Maroochydore to the south-east.

== Amenities ==
Horton Park Golf Club Maroochydore was relocated to David Low Way in Bli Bli in May 2015. The club was renamed Maroochy River Golf Club and has 18 championship holes with a driving range.

The Sunshine Coast Regional Council operates a mobile library service which visits the David Low Way.

Bli Bli Uniting Church is at 10–12 Lefoes Road (26.6135°S 153.0378°E). It is part of the Mary Burnett Presbytery.

The Bli Bli branch of the Queensland Country Women's Association meets at the Uniting Church.

== See also ==
- List of reduplicated Australian place names
