= Maroochydore =

- Town
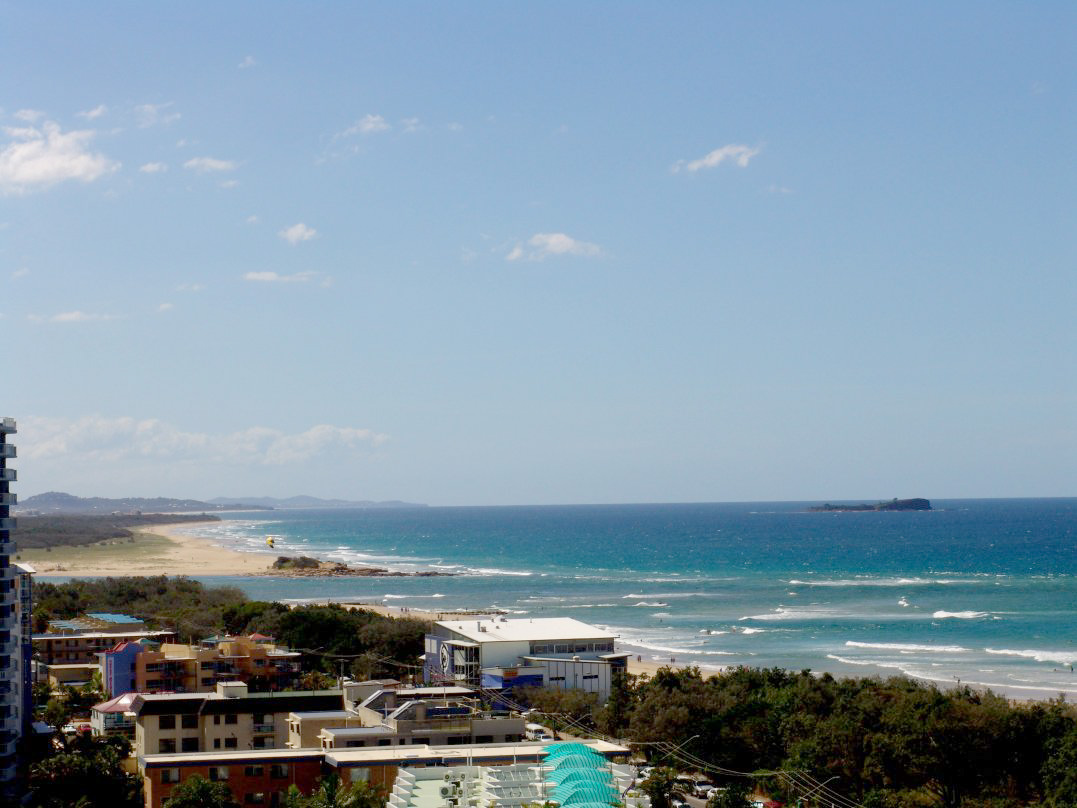
- View of Maroochydore

- Interactive map of Maroochydore
- Coordinates: 26.6553°S 153.0932°E
- Country: Australia
- State: Queensland
- Region: South East Queensland
- City: Sunshine Coast
- LGA: Sunshine Coast Region
- Location: 15.7 km (9.8 mi) ESE of Nambour; 22.9 km (14.2 mi) N of Caloundra; 81.5 km (50.6 mi) SE of Gympie; 104 km (65 mi) N of Brisbane

Government
  - State electorate: Maroochydore
  - Federal division: Fairfax

Area
  - Total: 12.6 km^{2} (4.9 sq mi)
- Elevation: 7 m (23 ft)

Population
  - Total: 63,673 (2021 census)
  - Density: 5,053/km^{2} (13,090/sq mi)
- Time zone: UTC+10:00 (AEST)
- Postcode: 4558
- Mean max temp: 25.1 °C (77.2 °F)
- Mean min temp: 15.8 °C (60.4 °F)
- Annual rainfall: 1,310.6 mm (51.60 in)
Localities around Maroochydore
Bli Bli; Pacific Paradise	Twin Waters	Coral Sea
Diddillibah; Kuluin	Maroochydore	Coral Sea
Buderim	Alexandra Headland	Coral Sea

Maroochydore (/məˈruːtʃidɔːr/ mə-ROO-chee-dor) is a coastal town in the Sunshine Coast Region, Queensland, Australia. In the 2021 census, the urban area of Maroochydore had a population of 63,673 people.

Maroochydore is a major commercial area of the Sunshine Coast with most shopping precincts located in the central business district. It is home to the Sunshine Plaza shopping centre and the Sunshine Coast's major bus interchange for Translink services operated by Kinetic Sunshine Coast. Maroochydore is also a venue of major surf sport carnivals, and is a popular holiday point from which to travel the rest of Queensland.

== Geography ==
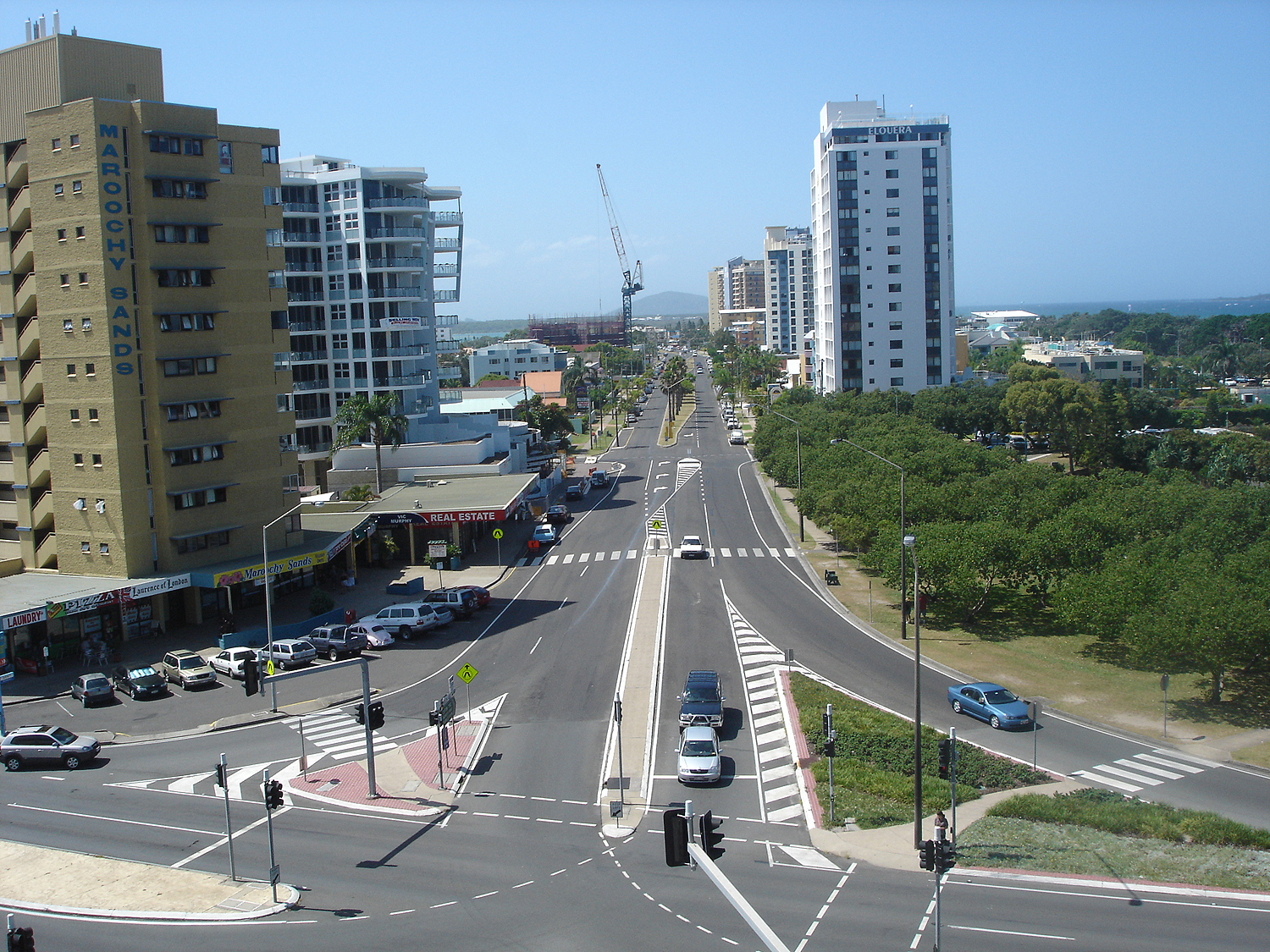
Maroochydore apartments, 2006

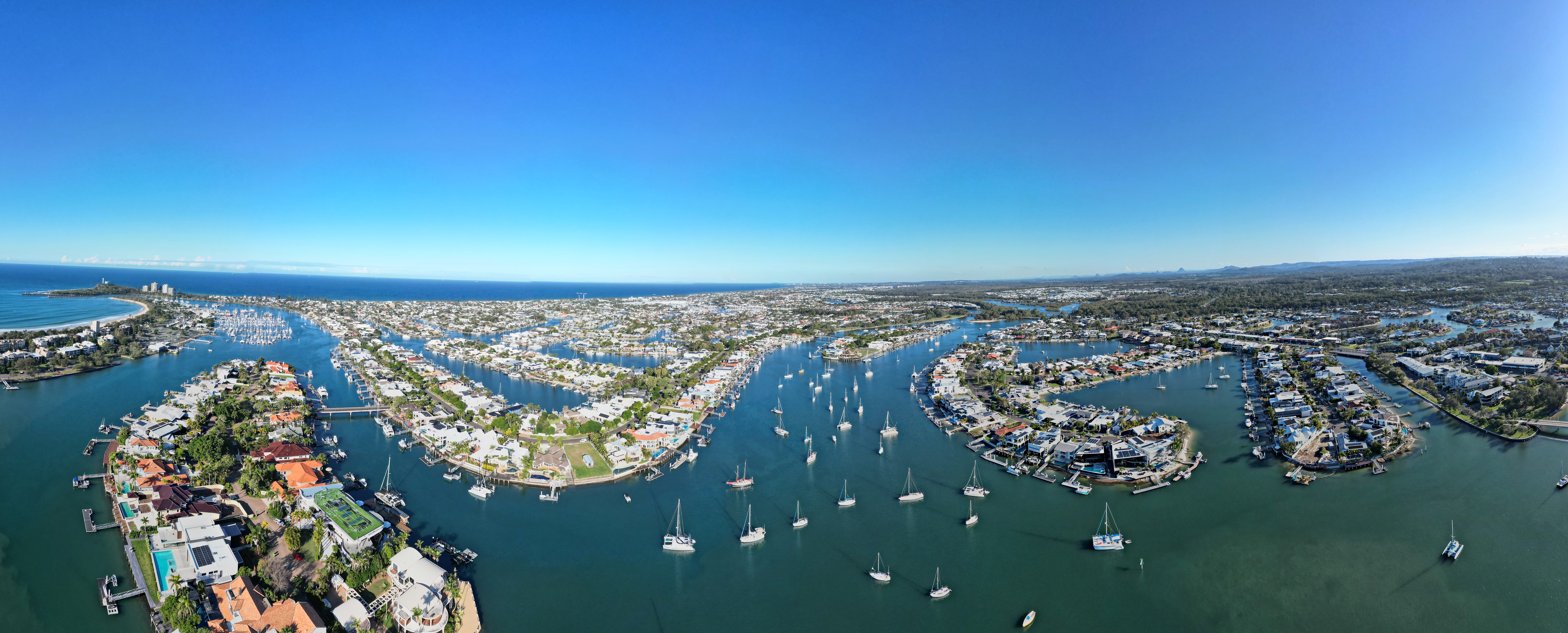
Aerial perspective of Mooloolaba's network of waterways

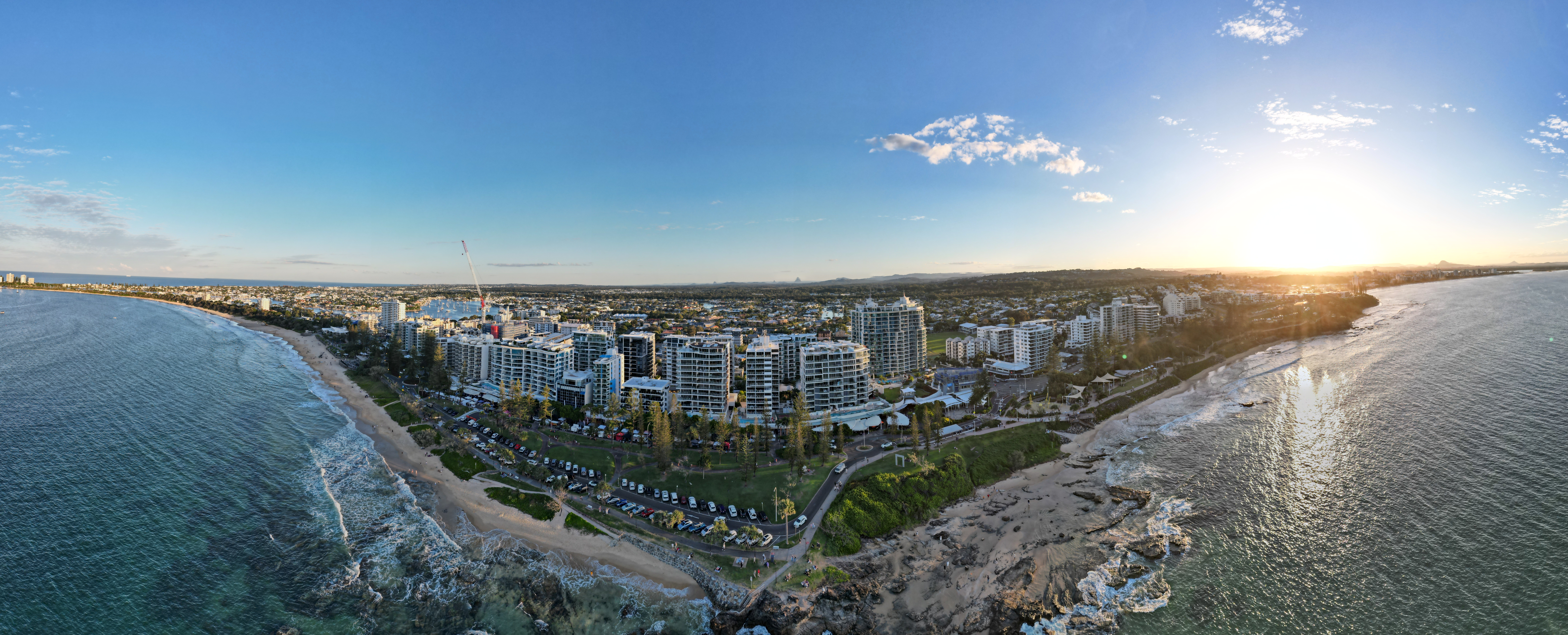
Sunset over Maroochydore

The boundaries of the Maroochydore as a locality are well-defined. As a town, Maroochydore does not have strict boundaries. The central business district (CBD) for the area is located on Horton Parade, Maroochydore.

Maroochy Waters is a waterfront, residential estate located in Maroochydore adjacent to the Maroochy River in Queensland, Australia. It is one of the last canal projects to be built in Queensland with direct access to the river system and the Coral Sea. Sunshine Coast Council has an annual dredging program to replenish the sand beaches. The canals plus all infrastructure were built in three stages in the late 1970s, mid 1980s, and the early 1990s. The deep water canal plays a role in flood relief and the land is higher than Maroochydore CBD which has recorded floods in the last 30 years. The canal's main reach, which extends for more than one km, was the training ground for 1992 Olympic K–1 1000 m gold medalist Clint Robinson.

== History ==
The name Maroochydore was given to the area by Andrew Petrie in 1842. The name comes from the Yuggera language word Muru-kutchi, meaning red-bill and referring to the black swan, which is commonly seen in the area.

The city was subdivided from the Cotton Tree reserve by Surveyor Thomas O'Connor in 1908. The land was acquired from William Pettigrew who had a timber depot at what is now Wharf Street.

Maroochydore Post Office opened on 4 October 1922 (a receiving office had been open from 1891 until 1898, and from 1916).

Our Lady Star of the Sea (Stella Maris) Catholic Church was officially opened by Archbishop James Duhig on Sunday 15 October 1950. It replaced an earlier church which had become inadequate for the growing congregation. The 1950 church could seat 170 people in the nave and a further 150 people on the verandahs on either side of the church. Timber from the recently demolished St Joseph's Catholic Church in Nambour was used to construct the Maroochydore church to reduce the costs. The architect was Frank Cullen and the contractor was K. D. Morris.

The Maroochydore Library opened in 1975.

Horton Park Golf Club is in Maroochydore. The club relocated to Bli Bli in May 2015 and changed names to Maroochy River Golf Club. The relocation of the golf course allowed the Sunshine Regional Council to develop the land into a new city centre for the region known as Sunshine Central.

The redevelopment is next to Sunshine Cove, a new sustainable residential and commercial development that has revitalized the general town centre and the development won the award from the Urban Development Institute of Australia for the best residential property Development at its annual Australian awards night in 2016.

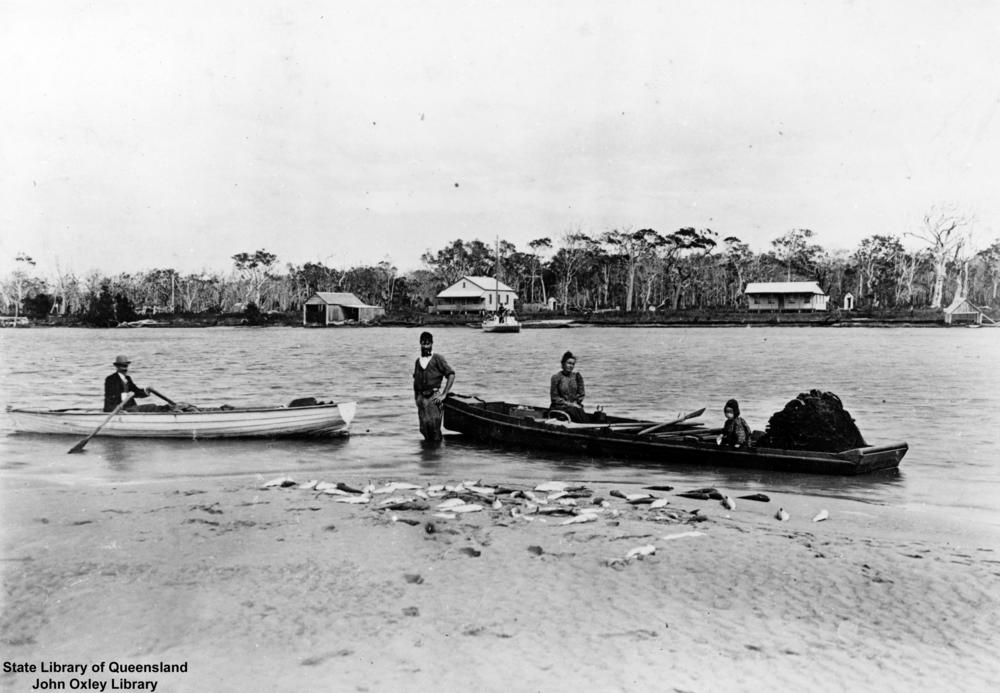
Fish haul, 1907

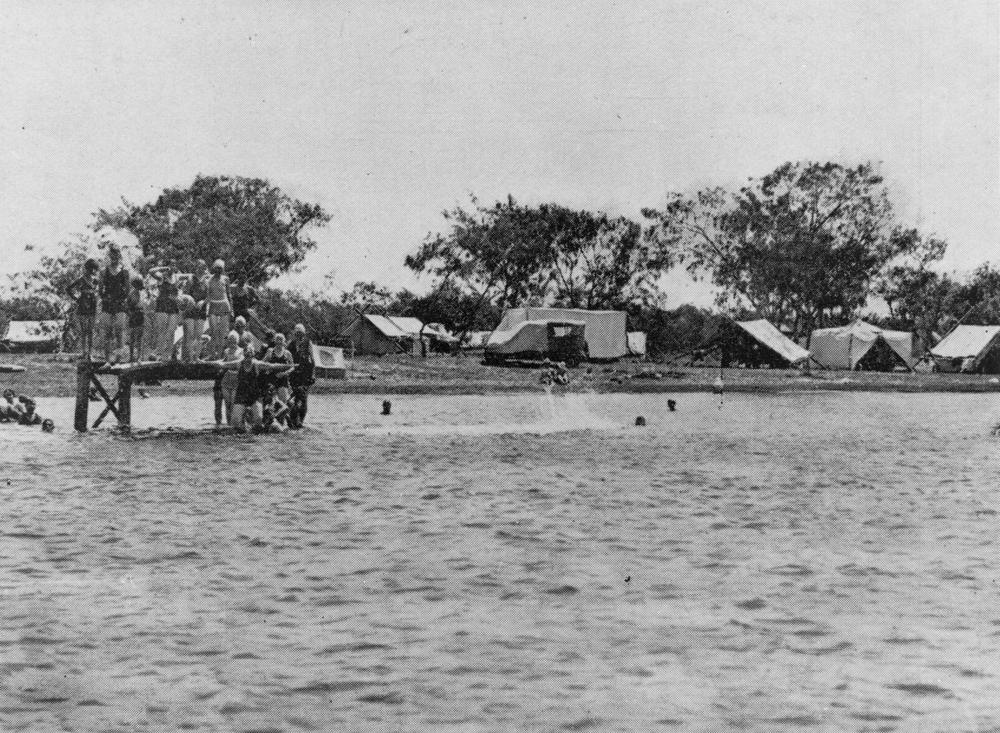
Camping, 1932

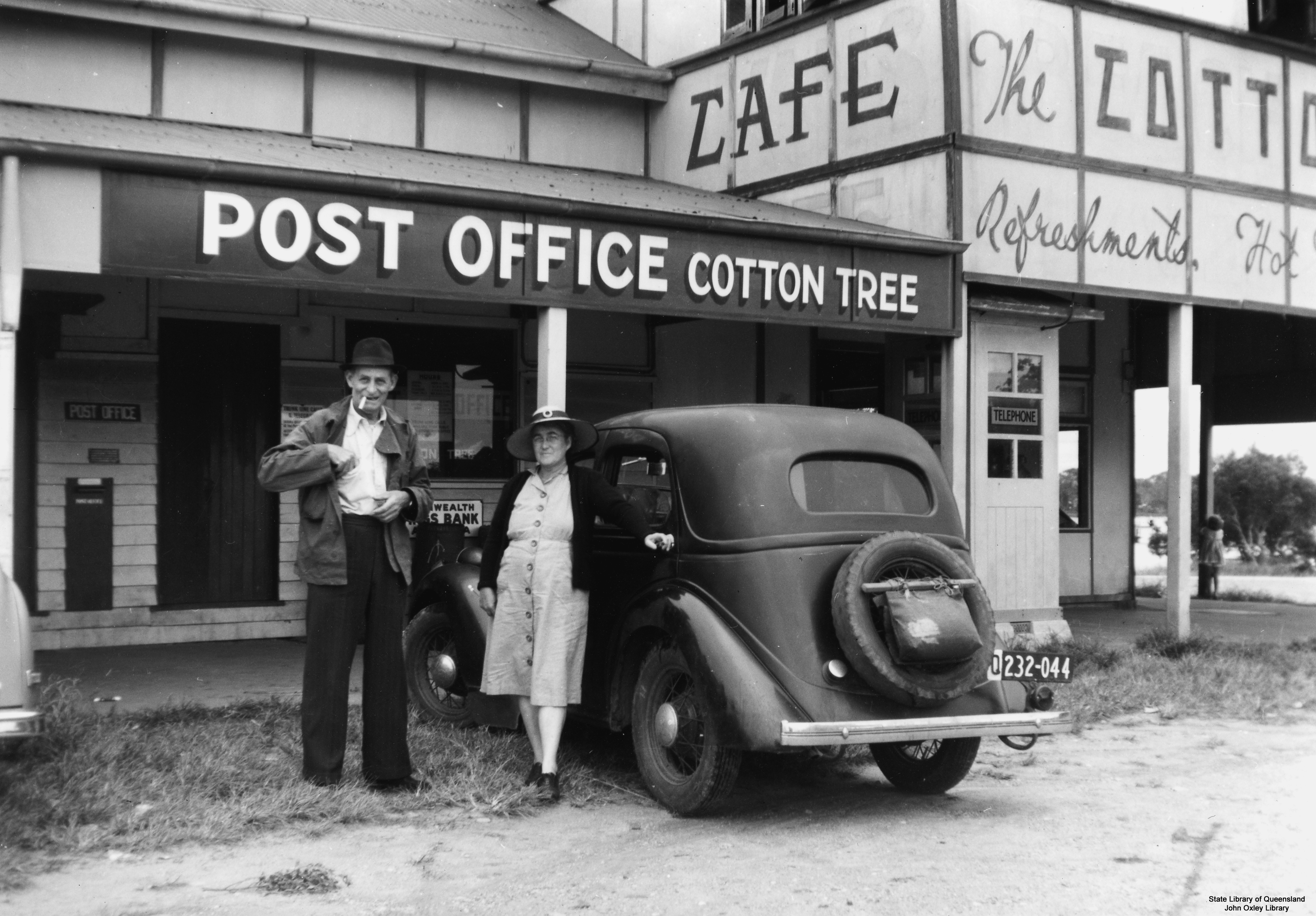
Cotton Tree Post Office

== Demographics ==
In the 2016 census, the urban area of Maroochydore had a population of 56,308 people.

In the 2021 census, the urban area of Maroochydore had a population of 63,673 people.

The 2016 and 2021 statistics include the following suburbs from north to south: coastal strip of Coolum Beach, Point Arkwright, Yaroomba, coastal part of Mount Coolum, Marcoola, Mudjimba (including Mudjima Island), the eastern part of Bli Bli, Pacific Paradise, Twin Waters, Maroochydore, Kuluin, Alexandra Headland, and Mooloolaba.

== Heritage listings ==
Cotton Tree has a number of heritage-listed sites, including:

- Cotton Tree Parade: Cotton Tree Caravan Park (26.6523°S 153.1006°E)

== Transport ==
Maroochydore's suburbs are served by Kinetic Sunshine Coast, who operate from outside the Sunshine Plaza in the CBD. Various bus routes connect Maroochydore to Buderim, Coolum, Kawana Waters, Caloundra, Nambour and Noosa Heads.

Maroochydore is accessible via train and connecting bus via Nambour, Woombye and Landsborough stations on the North Coast line has regular services to Brisbane, operated by Queensland Rail. There are also coach services from Sunshine Plaza to Brisbane Airport.

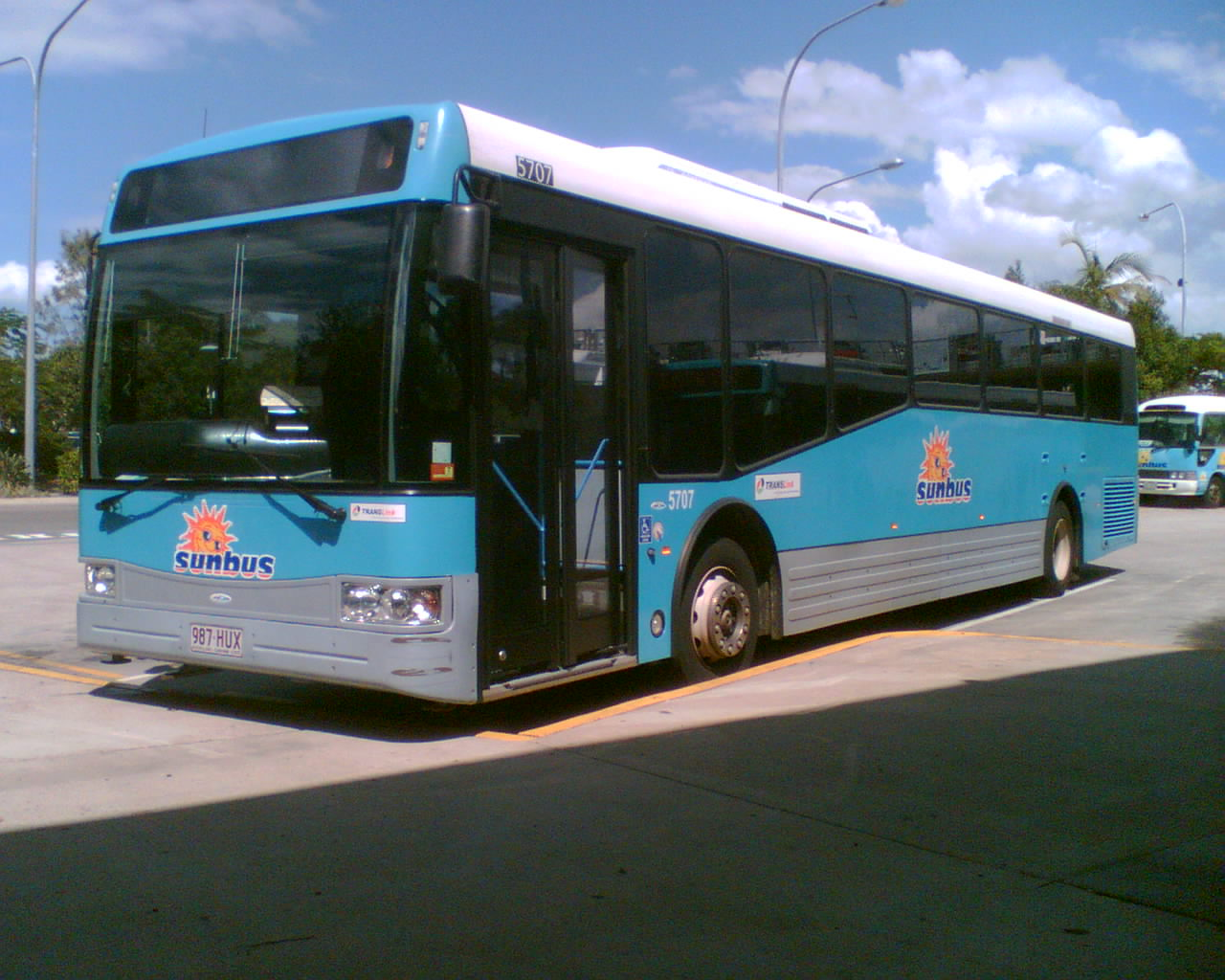
Kinetic Sunshine Coast Bustech bodied Volvo B12BLE at Sunshine Plaza in June 2006

Sunshine Coast Airport is located just north of the urban centre in Marcoola. It offers domestic flights to state capital cities around Australia.

There are plans to create a new railway line that would extend from the current Gympie North line. The proposed line would connect Caloundra, Kawana Waters and Maroochydore with Brisbane and would terminate at the Sunshine Coast Airport. A light rail system has also been proposed, which would leave from the Maroochydore CBD and connect the local regional hubs before terminating at Caloundra.

== Amenities ==
Sunshine Coast Council operates a public library at 44 Sixth Avenue, Cotton Tree.

The Maroochydore branch of the Queensland Country Women's Association meets at 104 Memorial Avenue.

== Education ==
There are a number of schools serving the Maroochydore urban area:

- Bli Bli State School (1901)
- Kuluin State School (1987)
- Maroochydore State School (1921)
- Mooloolaba State School (1933)
- Mountain Creek State School (1994)
- Maroochydore State High School (1964)
- Mountain Creek State High School (1995)
- Pacific Paradise State School (1992)
- Immanuel Lutheran College (1982)
- Stella Maris Catholic Primary School (1980)
- Siena Catholic College (1997)

== Media ==
=== Newspapers ===
Along with a number of other regional Australian newspapers owned by NewsCorp, the Kawana/Maroochy Weekly newspaper ceased publication in June 2020.

=== Television ===
Maroochydore is served by 3 major free-to-air commercial television networks:

- Seven Queensland – Seven Network owned and operated
- WIN Television – Nine Network affiliate
- 10 Queensland – Network 10 owned and operated
- ABC Television
- SBS Television

Of the three major commercial networks:

- Seven News airs a half-hour local bulletin for the Sunshine Coast, airing each weeknight at 6pm. It is produced and broadcast from studios in the city.
- WIN News airs a half-hour statewide news bulletin for Regional Queensland, airing each weeknight at 5:30pm. Select local stories from the Sunshine Coast is inserted into this bulletin, although local weather remains intact at the end of the bulletin as an opt-out window. It is produced from a newsroom in the city and broadcast from studios in Wollongong. A dedicated local WIN News bulletin for the Sunshine Coast was broadcast until 30th June 2021.
- Network 10 airs short regional 10 News updates throughout the day, broadcast from studios in Hobart.

Maroochydore also falls under the Brisbane television license area, allowing residents to receive Brisbane commercial stations such as Seven's BTQ, Nine's QTQ and 10's TVQ.

=== Radio ===
Maroochydore is served by a variety of local commercial and community radio stations such as ABC Sunshine Coast, 91.9 Sea FM, 92.7 Mix FM, 91.1 Hot FM and Zinc 96.1. The town also falls under the Brisbane metropolitan radio license area and can also receive Brisbane stations.

== Sport ==
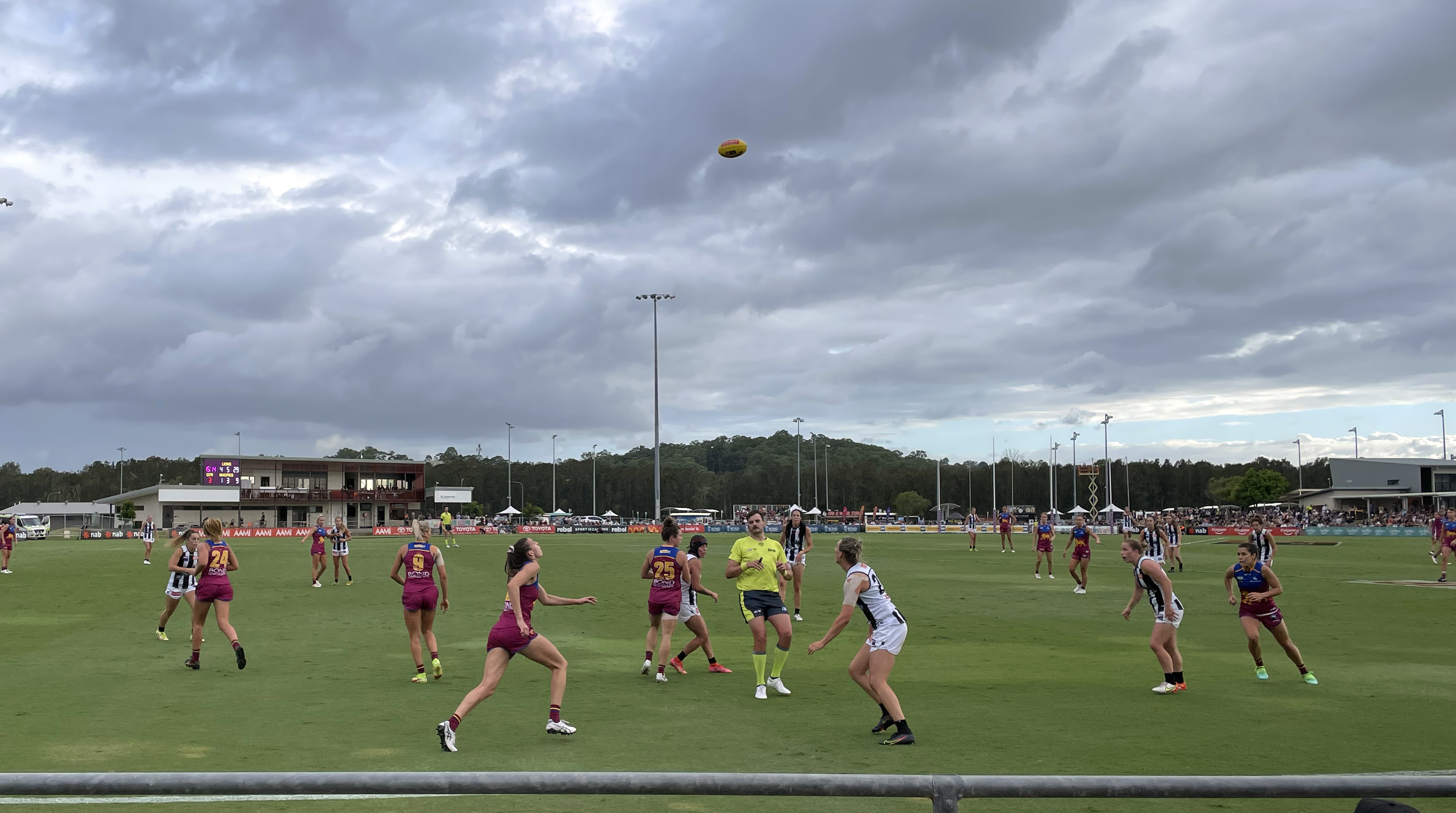
Maroochydore Multi Sports Complex hosts a sell-out AFL Women's premiership match between the Brisbane Lions and Collingwood FC in 2022.

All four football codes are popular in Maroochydore. The Maroochydore Multi Sports Complex is home to both the AFL and soccer and has hosted AFL Women's premiership matches and AFL pre-season matches. The Maroochydore Australian Football Club (Roos) (founded 1969) competes in the Queensland Australian Football League (QAFL) competition, the state's premier semi-professional level and also fields women's and junior sides. The Maroochydore Football Club (Swans) (founded 1968) play in the Football Queensland Premier League 2 and also fields women's and junior sides. The Maroochydore Rugby League Club (Swans) (founded 1972) competes in the Sunshine Coast Gympie Rugby League and also fields women's and junior sides. The Maroochydore Rugby Union (Swans) (founded 1974) competes in the Sunshine Coast Rugby Union competition and also fields junior sides.

Cricket is also popular and the Maroochydore Cricket Club is based at Elizabeth Daniels Park.

== In popular culture ==
Maroochydore is the sixth town mentioned in the original (Australian) version of the song "I've Been Everywhere".

== See also ==
- Maroochy air crash
