= Sunshine Coast Airport =

Airport in Queensland, Australia

Sunshine Coast Airport Sunshine Coast–Maroochydore

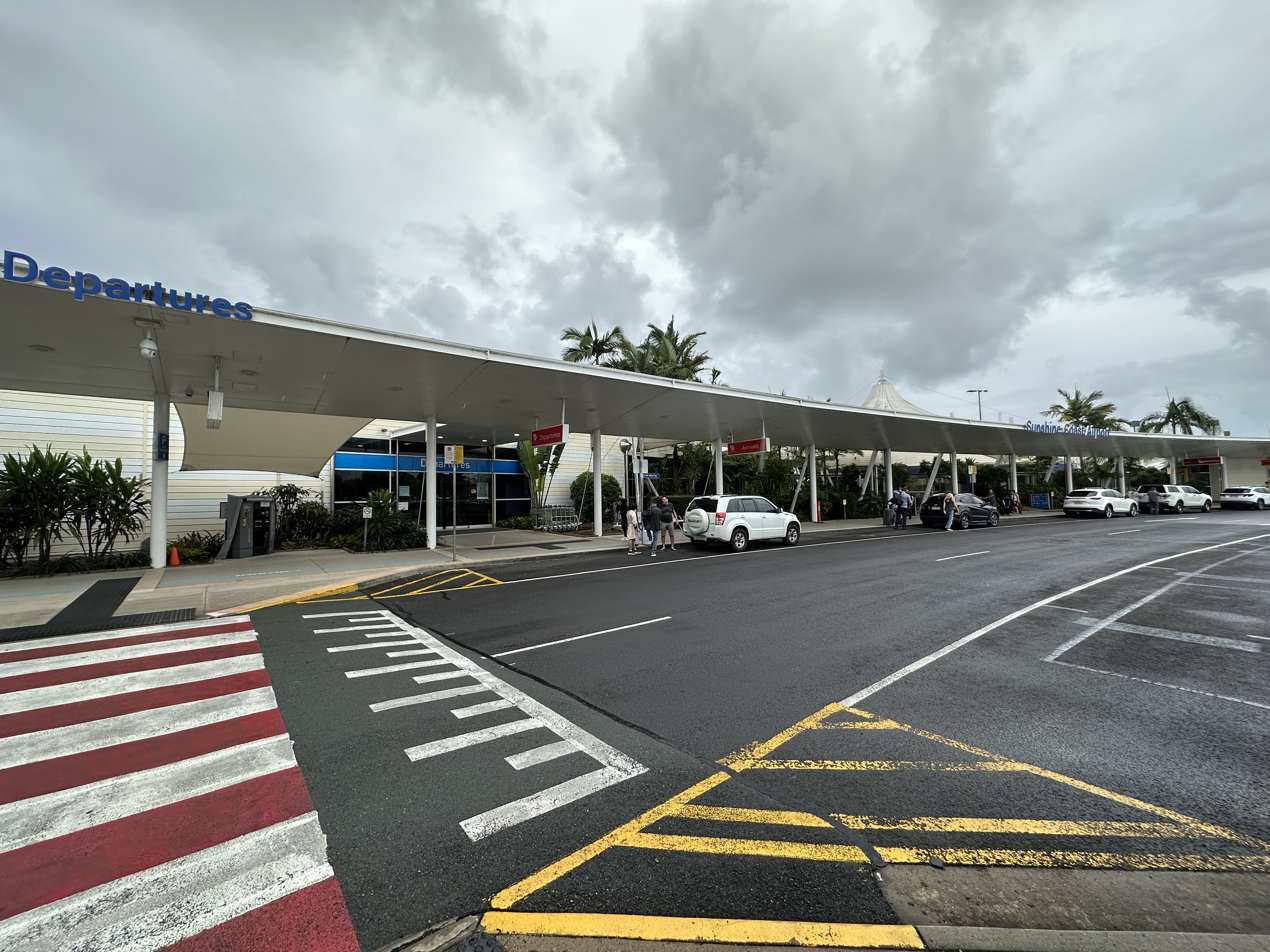
- IATA: MCY; ICAO: YBSU

Summary
- Airport type: Public
- Owner: Sunshine Coast Council
- Operator: Palisade Investment Partners
- Serves: Sunshine Coast, Queensland, Australia
- Location: Marcoola, Queensland
- Opened: 12 August 1961; 65 years ago
- Elevation AMSL: 15 ft (4.6 m)
- Coordinates: 26°36′12″S 153°05′30″E
- Website: sunshinecoastairport.com.au

Maps
- Location within South East Queensland Location within Queensland Location within Australia Location within Oceania
- Interactive map of Sunshine Coast Airport

Runways
Direction	Length		Surface
Direction	m	ft	Surface
13/31	2,450	8,038	Asphalt

Statistics
- Passengers (2023–24): 1,884,990
- Aircraft movements (2022): 51,204
- Other sources: AIP

Sunshine Coast Airport (formerly Maroochydore Airport) (IATA: MCY, ICAO: YBSU) is an Australian international airport located in Marcoola, 10 km (6.2 mi) north of Maroochydore, roughly centrally located along the coast of the Sunshine Coast Region. It is approximately 90 km (56 mi) north of centre of Brisbane, within the South East Queensland agglomeration. The airport is owned by Sunshine Coast Council and is the principal and only jet-capable airport serving the urban area of nearly 400,000 residents.

The airport serves as a gateway to holiday destinations such as Noosa Heads, Maroochydore, Mooloolaba, and Caloundra. There are direct flights to Adelaide, Melbourne, Sydney, and multiple destinations throughout Queensland. Additionally, both Jetstar and Air New Zealand operate international services to Auckland 3 times weekly, with the latter serviced as a seasonal route. The airport also supports a variety of tourism, flight training and general aviation activities.

Sunshine Coast Airport was the 10th-busiest airport in Australia and the fourth-busiest in Queensland during the 2023–24 financial year, handling 1,884,990 passengers.

== History ==
Maroochydore was originally served by Maroochydore Aerodrome, which closed around 1937. On 19 July, 1946, Meridan Plains was advocated as the site for a new airport during a North Coast Council of Progress Associations meeting. A deputation representing the association presented the proposal to the Landsborough Council, which included representatives of the Mooloolaba Progress Association, Maroochydore Progress Association, and Palmwood Progress Association. A preliminary inspection was conducted at the site, which comprised over 1000 acres, determining that it would be feasible for aviation usage. The deputation also suggested the construction of a road from each side of the Mooloolah River, a bridge over the river, and a temporary landing strip at minimum cost. In 1954, a site for the new airport was proposed by the Near North Coast and Mary Valley Council Progress Associations. In 1958, the site was surveyed by Fred Murray, which at the time was sugar cane fields and dense tea-tree scrub all shrouded with mosquitos. In 1959, the Pacific Paradise Development Company facilitated the construction of a new 2,000 foot long runway, costing 3,000 pounds. On 14 August, 1959, Roy Kassulked landed his HAL HT-2 on the newly constructed runway, becoming the first pilot to land an aircraft at Maroochydore Airport.

=== Operations ===
On 12 August, 1961, Maroochydore Airport was officially opened by Minister of Civil Aviation, Senator Shane Paltridge. The first hangar was also built, and began housing the Sunland Aviation by 1965. A terminal building was constructed in 1979. The runway was extended to 1,797 m (5,896 ft) in 1983 to allow the operation of Fokker F28 Fellowship and BAe 146 regional jets. The runway was upgraded again in 1993 to allow the operation of larger Boeing 737 and Airbus A320 jets. A new terminal building was completed in 1997 and the airport was renamed Maroochydore-Sunshine Coast Airport.

By 2009, the airport handled 916,845 annual passengers, making it the 15th busiest airport in Australia. On 3 June 2010, the airport changed its name from "Maroochydore-Sunshine Coast Airport" to "Sunshine Coast Airport" and changed its ICAO code from YBMC to YBSU. The airport handled approximately 87,000 aircraft movements in 2012 and was nearing or exceeding its capacity of 900,000 annual passengers in consecutive years .

Sunshine Coast Airport branding used prior to August 2022

=== International flights and growth ===
In February 2012, Air New Zealand announced plans to launch a new twice-weekly service between Auckland and Sunshine Coast Airport, to operate seasonally from July to September, the first time scheduled International flights had operated from Sunshine Coast Airport. Customs, immigration and quarantine facilities were added to the terminal ahead of the first flight. On 12 November, Air New Zealand announced that the season would be extended in 2013, with flights operating from June to October. Air New Zealand later committed to operating the services until at least 2017.

2016 saw domestic airlines Jetstar, QantasLink and Virgin Australia significantly increase their capacity through Sunshine Coast Airport, adding more than 65,000 extra seats. 24,200 more seats were added between Sydney and Sunshine Coast, 16,920 extra on the Melbourne to Sunshine Coast route, while Jetstar introduced direct flights to Adelaide, providing 23,400 seats on the new route.

On 9 February 2017, Sunshine Coast Regional Council mayor Mark Jamieson announced that Palisade Investment Partners had been awarded a 99-year lease to operate the airport, with the lease running until 2116.

=== Expansion and reconfiguration ===
To address capacity issues at the airport, John Holland Group were contracted to undertake a major upgrade and expansion project in 2018. As part of the construction, the existing 1,797 m (5,896 ft) runway 18/36, which handled all commercial jet traffic was decommissioned and converted to a taxiway. Its replacement was a new 2,450 m (8,040 ft) NW-SE runway (Runway 13/31). To allow for this, the 650 m (2,130 ft) general aviation runway (12/30) was also removed. The scope of these works were controversial amongst airport tenants and communities that would be overflown by the new flight paths, becoming the subject of numerous legal challenges.

A series of environmental considerations were given to the expansion, including the Coordinator-General's recommendation to ensure the requirements for tidal flap to allow conveyance of floodwater and avoid submergence of mangrove roots for extended periods. Other requirement such as offsetting to provide additional critical habitat for vulnerable flora and fauna including revegetation of sections to provide adequate and alternate suitable wildlife corridors for species.

On 14 June 2020, the new runway (13/31) was opened, allowing operation of larger wide body aircraft such as Airbus A330 and Boeing 777, Boeing 787 with longer range capable of direct flights to Southeast Asia, China and Hawaii, with minimal impact on nearby residents. This upgrade also allowed for more domestic flights, typically using Boeing 737 and Airbus A320 airliners, to operate with greater payloads.

During 2019, Air New Zealand had already extended seasonal flights to Auckland from 2020 through to 2023 with the backing of the Queensland Government, operating from April to October. Following completion of the airport's expansion, on 25 June 2021 a further agreement was announced that secured year-round flights on the route. Unfortunately, likely due to a side effect of COVID on air travel, Air New Zealand's flights to Auckland have remained seasonal.

In February 2022, low-cost carrier Bonza announced that the airport would become its headquarters and one of two main bases for its planned start-up operation. At its peak, Bonza operated services to 16 destinations across Queensland, New South Wales, Victoria, Tasmania and the Northern Territory. Plagued with reliability issues and financial troubles, Bonza suspended all operations on 30 April 2024, before entering voluntary administration and subsequently having their aircraft repossessed. The collapse of Bonza was expected to result in a substantial decrease in passenger numbers at the airport.

In June 2024, Jetstar announced an expansion of their route offerings from the Sunshine Coast Airport. The first new route began on 3 December 2024, four times per week between the Sunshine Coast and Cairns. A second new route commenced on 13 December 2024, three times per week between the Sunshine Coast and Auckland, the first time a connection between these two destinations had operated year-round. In November 2025, Jetstar announced flights to Singapore via Denpasar to commence in March 2026, connecting the Sunshine Coast to Asia for the first time.. In June 2026 due to rising fuel costs Jetstar announced it will terminate the Auckland service in October 2026.

== Terminal and facilities ==
The airport has a single terminal, which can be split into separate international and domestic areas to accommodate Jetstar and Air New Zealand's Auckland flights. The single-storey building has no aerobridges; passengers must take a short walk across the tarmac to reach their aircraft. Since the airports post-COVID boom, Sunshine Coast Airport has erected canvas-style waiting rooms at multiple gates in an attempt to quickly increase seating options. There are currently no published plans for an expanded airport terminal.

There are no airline lounges within the terminal, however the public departure lounge provides seating available for about 350 people. Free WiFi is available throughout the building and there are several food and shopping outlets. Each of the six airlines operating have dedicated check-in desks and gates. There are four baggage carousels, TV monitors, a taxi rank, shuttle bus services and hire-car desks.

== Statistics ==
Annual passenger statistics for Sunshine Coast Airport
Year	Domestic	International	Total	Change
1998	279,546	-	279,546	▼ –1.3%
1999	298,533	-	298,533	▲6.8%
2000	268,302	-	268,302	▼ –10.1%
2001	230,697	-	230,697	▼ –14.0%
2002	241,700	-	241,700	▲4.8%
2003	392,133	-	392,133	▲62.2%
2004	516,167	-	516,167	▲31.6%
2005	764,137	-	764,137	▲48.0%
2006	846,723	-	846,723	▲10.8%
2007	868,169	-	868,169	▲2.5%
2008	950,523	-	950,523	▲9.5%
2009	859,007	-	859,007	▼ –9.6%
2010	863,669	-	863,669	▲0.5%
2011	857,415	-	857,415	▼ –0.7%
2012	789,662	5,713	795,375	▼ –7.2%
2013	858,099	8,405	866,504	▲8.9%
2014	862,100	10,248	872,348	▲0.7%
2015	888,106	13,598	901,704	▲3.4%
2016	992,752	17,506	1,010,258	▲12.0%
2017	1,112,965	13,719	1,126,684	▲11.5%
2018	1,220,602	14,303	1,234,905	▲9.6%
2019	1,269,952	13,084	1,283,036	▲3.9%
2020	327,378	-	327,378	▼ –74.5%
2021	576,199	512	576,711	▲76.2%
2022	1,485,533	7,902	1,493,435	▲159.0%
2023	1,834,532	12,783	1,847,315	▲23.6%
2024	1,688,860	15,937	1,704,797	▼ –8.0%

Busiest routes out of Sunshine Coast Airport for passengers carried (Year ending December)
Rank	Airport	2015	2016	2017	2018	2019	2020	2021	2022	% Change (12 month)
1	Sydney	472,200	513,600	558,500	628,800	665,000	155,900	227,000	684,000	▲201%
2	Melbourne	379,400	427,100	458,100	544,900	558,000	134,400	270,000	724,000	▲168%
3	Auckland	8,026	10,228	13,728	14,303	13,084	0	512	7,902	▲1,443%
Total		859,626	950,928	1,030,328	1,188,003	1,236,084	290,300	497,512	1,415,902	▲184%

== Airlines and destinations ==
Airlines	Destinations
Air Fraser Island	Charter: K'gari (Fraser Island)
Air New Zealand	Seasonal: Auckland
Alliance Airlines	Charter: Emerald
Jetstar	Adelaide, Cairns, Denpasar, Melbourne, Singapore, Sydney
Qantas	Melbourne, Sydney
Virgin Australia	Melbourne, Sydney

== Ground transport ==
The airport is served by local taxi service Suncoast Cabs and by Kinetic Sunshine Coast's route 622 from Sunshine Plaza to Noosa Junction.

Airport shuttle services are run by several companies offering transfer to Sunshine Coast hotels and private residences. They connect to all suburbs south of the Sunshine Coast Airport including Twin Waters, Maroochydore, Alexandra Headland, Mooloolaba, Kawana Waters, Buderim, Caloundra, Golden Beach and Pelican Waters.

In 2023 the airport opened a new Car Rental Centre, providing a new home for car rental companies. The relocation of the car rental companies allowed for an expanded passenger carpark, along with additional room within the airports Arrivals Hall.

== See also ==
- Caloundra Airport
- Noosa Airport
- List of airports in Queensland
