= Maroochy River =

River in Queensland, Australia

Coordinates: 26°39′S 153°06′E

Maroochy
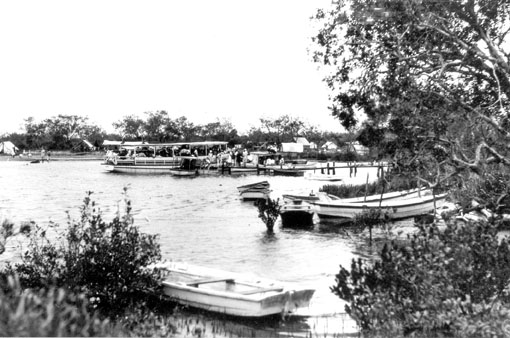
- A river excursion, 1931

Location
- Country: Australia
- State: Queensland
- Region: South East Queensland

Physical characteristics
- Source: Blackall Range
- Mouth: Maroochydore
- Basin size: 630 km^{2} (240 sq mi)

The Maroochy River is a river in South East Queensland, Australia. The river rises from the eastern slopes of the Blackall Range and flows east through Eumundi before entering the sea at Cotton Tree, Maroochydore. Other populated centres in the catchment include Nambour, Eudlo, Yandina and Coolum.

The suburb south of the Airport, and North of the River and west of the Motorway is known as Maroochy River.

== Course ==
The watershed of the Maroochy River encompasses 630 square kilometres (240 sq mi) of undulating hills, which have been cleared for agriculture and urban uses. There are three dams in the catchment area, including Wappa Dam, Cooloolabin Dam and Poona Dam, which total 13,452 megalitres (475.1×10^{6} cu ft) of capacity.

There are two main arms: North and South Maroochy Rivers. Tributaries of the river include Petrie Creek and its major tributary, Paynter Creek, Eudlo Creek, Coolum Creek, Doonan Creek and Yandina Creek.

There is one Canal system open to the river Maroochy Waters and a second Canal system with restricted access to the river, namely Twin Waters. There are also numerous lake systems, such as Sunshine Cove, which drain into the river and its creeks.

There are a number of named islands in the river, including Pincushion Island, Goat Island, Channel Island, Chambers Island and Bungee's Island.

== Cultural significance ==
Maroochy is derived from the Indigenous Turrbal people's name for a black swan, marutchi. Andrew Petrie named the river Maroochy after the black swans he saw during an exploration of the area in 1842. On this trip, two Turrbal men were accompanying Petrie, who presumably advised him of the name of the swan. The Maroochy River is culturally significant as Aboriginal cultural heritage records depict stories of the formation of the river together with other locally significant lands, including Mudjimba Island, Mount Coolum and Mount Ninderry.

== Environment ==
The Maroochy River is part of a blue carbon initiative, Australia's first partnership, that undertakes to provide land use options for recreation, farming and the like via environmentally effective approaches that maintain and improve the natural environment. The area is described as the "Blue Heart", and spans more than 5000 hectares aimed to preserve the benefits of the natural ecosystem of the wetland areas whilst improving human and environmental health and working toward a zero net emissions target.

The Maroochy River and wetland areas bordered by Bli Bli, Marcoola, Mudjimba, Diddillibah, Twin Waters and Maroochydore suburbs consist of several Australian Commonwealth, "nationally important wetlands" and "protected area" locations.

== Floods ==
Significant floods on the Maroochy River occurred in 1893, 1951, 1974 and 1992. In 1994, the Maroochy River flood warning system was set up to provide river height predictions for the Maroochy Shire Council.

== History ==
In the early days of settlement, the only way to travel from Yandina to Maroochydore was by boat along the Maroochy River.

By 1930, the growth of urban settlements improved due to changes in transport access in the Maroochy River region.

The mouth of the river was affected by the 2009 southeast Queensland oil spill, reaching about 2 kilometres (1.2 mi) upstream of the Maroochy Bridge.

== See also ==
- List of rivers of Australia
