= List of numbered roads in Queensland =

Numbered roads in Queensland provides readers with basic information about the many state-controlled roads in the state, particularly those for which there is no Wikipedia article. It also assists editors with the task of adding road information to existing and new road articles.

It is a list of all numbered roads in Queensland, Australia, as defined by the Department of Transport and Main Roads (TMR). The route and end-points of any numbered road can be determined by accessing the appropriate TMR map through this second reference document. There appears to be no easy way to determine which map to access for a particular road, but each map includes a numeric list of the roads to be found thereon.

NOTE: There is no relationship between Road Number and Route Number, and there is often a dissimilarity between the official Road Name and that in common use.

The list is presented in source document sequence to facilitate updating from future versions of that document. To find a road by name first sort on name and then use the index. To arrange all occurrences of a name in number order first sort on number and then proceed as above.

Brief footnotes on a number of roads that intersect with, or are associated with, roads that have a Wikipedia article, can be found in those articles. These roads are indicated in the list by a link to the article/s. Some of these may be developed into articles or sections of articles in future. For an example of this linking see Mount Isa - Duchess Road.

== Table ==
Except where otherwise indicated in the Notes column each road is state-controlled, and the Type field is a code for the type of network, being one of National (N), State Strategic (S), Regional (R) or District (D). Some roads are also classified as a local road of regional significance (LRRS)

Road name	Number	Type	LRRS	Notes	
Bruce Highway	10A	N		Brisbane - Gympie	
Bruce Highway	10B	N		Gympie - Maryborough	
Bruce Highway	10C	N		Maryborough - Gin Gin	
Bruce Highway	10D	N		Gin Gin - Benaraby	
Bruce Highway	10E	N		Benaraby - Rockhampton	
Bruce Highway	10F	N		Rockhampton - St Lawrence	
Bruce Highway	10G	N		St Lawrence - Mackay	
Bruce Highway	10H	N		Mackay - Proserpine	
Bruce Highway	10J	N		Proserpine - Bowen	
Bruce Highway	10K	N		Bowen - Ayr	
Bruce Highway	10L	N		Ayr - Townsville	
Bruce Highway	10M	N		Townsville - Ingham	
Bruce Highway	10N	N		Ingham - Innisfail	
Bruce Highway	10P	N		Innisfail - Cairns	
Pacific Highway	12A	N		Brisbane - NSW border	↑ (Top)
Landsborough Highway	13A	N		Morven - Augathella	
Landsborough Highway	13B	N		Augathella - Tambo	
Landsborough Highway	13C	N		Tambo - Blackall	
Landsborough Highway	13D	N		Blackall - Barcaldine	
Landsborough Highway	13E	N		Barcaldine - Longreach	
Landsborough Highway	13F	N		Longreach - Winton	
Landsborough Highway	13G	N		Winton - Kynuna	
Landsborough Highway	13H	N		Kynuna - Cloncurry	
Flinders Highway	14A	N		Townsville - Charters Towers	
Flinders Highway	14B	N		Charters Towers - Hughenden	
Flinders Highway	14C	N		Hughenden - Richmond	
Flinders Highway	14D	N		Richmond - Julia Creek	
Flinders Highway	14E	N		Julia Creek - Cloncurry	
Barkly Highway	15A	N		Cloncurry - Mount Isa	
Barkly Highway	15B	N		Mount Isa - Camooweal	
Barkly Highway	15C	N		Camooweal - NT border	
Cunningham Highway	17A	N		Ipswich Motorway	
Cunningham Highway	17B	N		Ipswich - Warwick	
Cunningham Highway (part)	17D	N		Inglewood - Goondiwindi	
Warrego Highway	18A	N		Ipswich - Toowoomba	
Warrego Highway	18B	N		Toowoomba - Dalby	
Warrego Highway	18C	N		Dalby - Miles	
Warrego Highway	18D	N		Miles - Roma	
Warrego Highway	18E	N		Roma - Mitchell	
Warrego Highway	18F	N		Mitchell - Morven	
New England Highway	22C	N		Warwick - Wallangarra	
Leichhardt Highway (part)	26C	N		Miles - Goondiwindi	
Gore Highway	28A	N		Toowoomba - Milmerran	
Gore Highway	28B	N		Milmerran - Goondiwindi	
Toowoomba Second Range Crossing	319	N			
Townsville Port Road	841	N			
South East Arterial Road (part)	U12A	N		Pacific Motorway	
Gateway Arterial Road	U13C	N		Gateway Motorway - North	
Gympie Arterial Road (part)	U14	N			
Port of Brisbane Motorway	U27	N			
Port Drive	NA24	N		Non state-controlled (Port of Brisbane)	
Logan Motorway (part)	210A	N		Non state-controlled (Gailes - Loganholme)	
Gateway Motorway	N239	N		Non state-controlled (Eight Mile Plains - Nudgee)	
Gateway Extension Motorway	N332	N		Non state-controlled (Drewvale - Eight Mile Plains)	
Capricorn Highway	16A	S		Rockhampton - Duaringa	
Capricorn Highway	16B	S		Duaringa - Emerald	
Capricorn Highway	16C	S		Emerald - Alpha	
Capricorn Highway	16D	S		Alpha - Barcaldine	
Cunningham Highway	17C	S		Warwick - Inglewood	
Cunningham Highway (part)	17D	S		Inglewood - Goondiwindi	
Isis Highway	19B	S		Childers - Biggenden	
Isis Highway	19C	S		Biggenden - Coalstoun Lakes	
New England Highway	22A	S		Yarraman - Toowoomba	
New England Highway	22B	S		Toowoomba - Warwick	
Mitchell Highway	23A	S		Barringun - Cunnamulla	
Mitchell Highway	23B	S		Cunnamulla - Charleville	
Mitchell Highway	23C	S		Charleville - Augathella	
Carnarvon Highway (part)	24A	S		Mungindi - St George	
Carnarvon Highway	24B	S		St George - Surat	
Carnarvon Highway	24C	S		Surat - Roma	
Carnarvon Highway	24D	S		Roma - Injune	
Carnarvon Highway	24E	S		Injune - Rolleston	
Leichhardt Highway	26A	S		Westwood - Taroom	
Leichhardt Highway	26B	S		Taroom - Miles	
Leichhardt Highway (part)	26C	S		Miles - Goondiwindi	
Gregory Highway	27A	S		Springsure - Emerald	
Gregory Highway	27B	S		Emerald - Clermont	
Gregory Highway	27C	S		Clermont - Peak Downs Highway, Clermont	
Peak Downs Highway	33A	S		Clermont - Nebo	
Peak Downs Highway	33B	S		Nebo - Mackay	
Castlereagh Highway	37A	S		Noondoo - Hebel	
D'Aguilar Highway (part)	40B	S		Kilcoy - Yarraman	
D'Aguilar Highway (part)	40C	S		Yarraman - Kingaroy	
Burnett Highway	41A	S		Nanango - Goomeri	
Burnett Highway	41B	S		Goomeri - Gayndah	
Burnett Highway	41C	S		Gayndah - Monto	
Burnett Highway	41D	S		Monto - Biloela	
Burnett Highway (part)	41E	S		Biloela - Mount Morgan	
Brisbane Valley Highway	42A	S		Ipswich - Harlin	
Dawson Highway (part)	46D	S		Rolleston - Springsure	
Gregory Developmental Road	98A	S		Peak Downs Highway, Clermont - Belyando Crossing	
Gregory Developmental Road	98B	S		Belyando Crossing - Charters Towers	
Port of Brisbane Road	904	S	Part	Lytton Road	
Cunningham Arterial Road	U16	S		Ipswich Motorway (Goodna - Rocklea)	
Griffith Arterial Road	U20	S		Granard, Riawena & Kessels Roads (Part of Metroad 2)	
Redland Sub-Arterial Road (part)	U91	S		Mount Gravatt - Capalaba Road (Parts of Metroad 2 & State Route 21)	
St George - Dirranbandi Road	EB35	S		Non state-controlled (Local govt road)	
Logan Motorway (part)	210A	S		Non state-controlled (Franchised road) Gailes - Loganholme	
Warrego Highway	18G	R		Morven - Charleville	
Isis Highway	19A	R		Bundaberg - Childers	
Captain Cook Highway	20A	R		Cairns - Mossman	
Palmerston Highway (part)	21A	R		Innisfail - Ravenshoe	
Carnarvon Highway (part)	24A	R		Mungindi - St George	
Mount Lindesay Highway	25A	R		Brisbane - Beaudesert	
Mount Lindesay Highway (part)	25B	R		Beaudesert - NSW border	
Barwon Highway	31A	R		Goondiwindi - Talwood	
Barwon Highway	31B	R		Talwood - Nindigully	
Kennedy Highway	32A	R		Cairns - Mareeba	
Kennedy Highway	32B	R	Part	Mareeba - Ravenshoe	
Kennedy Highway	32C	R		Ravenshoe - Mt Garnett	
Kennedy Highway	32D	R		Mt Garnett - The Lynd	
Mulligan Highway	34A	R		Mareeba - Mt Molloy	
Mulligan Highway	34B	R		Mount Molloy - Lakeland	
Mulligan Highway	34C	R		Lakeland - Cooktown	
Moonie Highway	35A	R		Dalby - St George	
Balonne Highway	36A	R		St George - Bollon	
Balonne Highway	36B	R		Bollon - Cunnamulla	
D'Aguilar Highway	40A	R		Caboolture - Kilcoy	↑ (Top)
D'Aguilar Highway (part)	40B	R		Kilcoy - Yarraman	
D'Aguilar Highway (part)	40C	R		Yarraman - Kingaroy	
Burnett Highway (part)	41E	R		Biloela - Mount Morgan	
Burnett Highway	41F	R		Mount Morgan - Rockhampton	
Wide Bay Highway	44A	R		Gympie - Goomeri	
Bunya Highway	45A	R		Dalby - Kingaroy	
Bunya Highway	45B	R		Kingaroy - Goomeri	
Dawson Highway	46A	R		Gladstone - Biloela	
Dawson Highway	46B	R		Biloela - Banana	
Dawson Highway	46C	R		Banana - Rolleston	
Dawson Highway (part)	46D	R		Rolleston - Springsure	
Cooper Developmental Road	79A	R		Quilpie - Bundeena	
Birdsville Developmental Road	80A	R		Morney - Birdsville	
Eyre Developmental Road	81A	R		Bedourie - Birdsville	
Eyre Developmental Road	81B	R		Birdsville - SA Border	
Suttor Developmental Road	82A	R	Part	Nebo - Mt Coolon	
Herveys Range Developmental Road	83A	R		Townsville - Battery (Burdekin River crossing just east of Basalt)	
Karumba Developmental Road	84A	R		Karumba Road	
Fitzroy Developmental Road	85C	R		Dingo - Mt Flora	
Burke Developmental Road	89A	R		Cloncurry - Normanton	
Burke Developmental Road (part)	89B	R		Normanton - Dimbulah	
Peninsula Developmental Road	90B	R		Lakeland - Laura	
Peninsula Developmental Road	90C	R		Laura - Coen	
Peninsula Developmental Road	90D	R		Coen - Weipa	
Gulf Developmental Road	92A	R		Normanton - Croydon	
Gulf Developmental Road	92B	R		Croydon - Georgetown	
Gulf Developmental Road	92C	R		Georgetown - Mt Garnet	
Diamantina Developmental Road	93A	R		Charleville - Quilpie	
Diamantina Developmental Road	93B	R		Quilpie - Windorah	
Diamantina Developmental Road (part)	93C	R		Windorah - Bedourie	
Diamantina Developmental Road	93D	R		Bedourie - Boulia	
Diamantina Developmental Road	93E	R		Boulia - Dajarra	
Diamantina Developmental Road	93F	R		Dajarra - Mount Isa	
Bulloo Developmental Road	94A	R		Cunnamulla - Thargomindah	
Bulloo Developmental Road	94B	R		Thargomindah - Bundeena	
Gregory Developmental Road	98C	R		Charters Towers - The Lynd	
Kennedy Developmental Road	99A	R		Mt Garnet - The Lynd	
Kennedy Developmental Road	99B	R		The Lynd - Hughenden	
Kennedy Developmental Road	99C	R		Hughenden - Winton	
Kennedy Developmental Road	99D	R		Winton - Boulia	
Southport - Nerang Road (part)	106	R	Yes		
Capalaba - Cleveland Road	112	R	Part		
Redcliffe Road (part)	120	R	Yes	Anzac Avenue	
Deception Bay Road	121	R	Yes		
Brighton - Redcliffe Road (part)	122	R	Yes	Houghton Highway, Hornibrok Esplanade, Oxley Avenue	
Clontarf - Anzac Avenue Road	123	R	Yes	Elizabeth Ave / Snook St	
Maroochydore Road (part)	136	R			
Eumundi - Noosa Road	140	R	Part		
Tin Can Bay Road (part)	143	R			
Emu Mountain Road (part)	144	R			
Sunshine Motorway	150A	R		Tanawha - Mooloolaba	
Sunshine Motorway	150B	R		Mooloolaba - Peregian	
Maryborough - Hervey Bay Road	163	R			
Maryborough - Cooloola Road	166	R			
Bundaberg Ring Road	177	R			
Gladstone - Mount Larcom Road	181	R			
Gladstone Port Access Road	183	R			
Gladstone - Benaraby Road	185	R			
Bajool - Port Alma Road	188	R			↑ (Top)
Rockhampton - Emu Park Road	194	R			
Rockhampton - Yeppoon Road	196	R			
Beaudesert - Nerang Road (part)	202	R			
Beaudesert - Beenleigh Road (part)	203	R			
Mundoolun Connection Road	209	R		See footnote in Beaudesert-Beenleigh Road	
Ipswich - Boonah Road (part)	211	R			
Beaudesert - Boonah Road	212	R			
Boonah - Fassifern Road	214	R			
Warwick - Killarney Road	221	R			
Inglewood - Texas Road	231	R			
Ipswich - Cunningham Highway Connection Road	301	R			
Gatton - Clifton Road (part)	313	R			
Gatton - Helidon Road (part)	314	R			
Dalby - Cecil Plains Road	325	R			
Millmerran - Inglewood Road	337	R			
Dalby - Kogan Road	340	R	Yes		
Kogan - Condamine Road	342	R	Yes		
Roma - Condamine Road	344	R	Yes		
Brisbane - Woodford Road (part)	401	R	Yes		
South Pine Road (part)	403	R	Yes		
Dalby - Cooyar Road	416	R			
Oakey - Cooyar Road (part)	417	R			↑ (Top)
Dalby - Jandowae Road	421	R			
Jandowae Connection Road	423	R			
Chinchilla - Wondai Road (part)	426	R			
Mundubbera - Durong Road	435	R			
Murgon - Gayndah Road	439	R			
Blackall - Jericho Road	441	R	Yes		
Glass House Mountains Road (part)	490	R			
Kilcoy - Beerwah Road	492	R			
Homebush Road	516	R			
Eton - Homebush Road	518	R			
Dysart - Middlemount Road	519	R	Yes		
Rockleigh - North Mackay Road	531	R	Yes		
Mackay - Eungella Road	532	R			
Marian - Eton Road	533	R	Yes		
Marian - Hampden Road	535	R			
Clermont Connection Road	551	R			
Clermont - Alpha Road	552	R	Yes		
Innisfail - Japoon Road (part)	627	R			
Henderson Drive	628	R		Currajah, near Innisfail	
Millaa Millaa - Malanda Road (part)	641	R			
Gillies Range Road	642	R			
Mareeba - Dimbulah Road	664	R			
Isisford - Blackall Road	716	R	Yes		
Mulgrave Road	809	R		Part of Bruce Highway in Cairns	
Port Connection Road	810	R		Cairns	
Mourilyan Harbour Road	814	R			
South Townsville Road	831	R		Abbott Street	
North Townsville Road	832	R		Woolcock Street	
Proserpine - Shute Harbour Road	851	R			
Hay Point Road	852	R			
Mackay - Bucasia Road	856	R	Yes		
Mackay - Slade Point Road (part)	857	R			
Everton Park - Albany Creek Road	900	R		Old Northern Road	
Brisbane - Redland Road	905	R			
Centenary Motorway	910	R		Yamanto - Ellen Grove	
Southern cross way	913	R			
Birkdale Road (part)	1122	R			
Millmerran - Cecil Plains Road	3251	R			
Daandine - Nandi Road	3401	R	Yes		
Noondoo - Thallon Road	3514	R	Yes		
Gatton - Esk Road	4144	R			
Roma - Taroom Road	4397	R	Yes		
Boogan Road	6272	R	Yes	Mourilyan - South Johnstone	
South Johnstone Road	6274	R			
East Evelyn Road	6404	R			
El Arish - Mission Beach Road (part)	8108	R			
Tully - Mission Beach Road	8202	R			
Caboolture Connection Road	9905	R	Yes	King Street	
South East Arterial Road (part)	U12A	R		Pacific Motorway	
Gympie Arterial Road (part)	U14	R			
Mount Lindesay Arterial Road	U15	R			
Centenary Motorway	U18A	R		Ellen Grove - Toowong	
Western Arterial Road	U18B	R		Toowong - Everton Park	
East-West Arterial Road	U19	R		Stafford Road	
Airport Link	U32	R		Shown as part of U19 on map	
Strathpine Sub-Arterial Road	U93	R	Yes	See footnote in Brisbane-Woodford Road	
Cleveland Sub-Arterial Road	U98	R	Part	Old Cleveland Road	
Redcliffe Sub-Arterial Road	U99	R	Yes	Deagon Deviation	
Peak Downs - Dysart Road	R44	R		Non state-controlled (Local Govt Road)	
German Creek Mine Road (519)	H53	R		Non state-controlled (Mining Road)	
Gold Coast Highway	11A	D	Yes	Helensvale - Southport	
Gold Coast Highway	11B	D	Yes	Broadbeach - Coolangatta	
Palmerston Highway (part)	21A	D	Yes	Innisfail - Ravenshoe	
Mount Lindesay Highway (part)	25B	D		Beaudesert - NSW Border	
Wills Developmental Road	78A	D	Part	Julia Creek - Burketown	
Fitzroy Developmental Road	85A	D	Yes	Taroom - Bauhinia	
Fitzroy Developmental Road	85B	D	Yes	Bauhinia - Duaringa	
Surat Developmental Road	86A	D	Yes	Surat - Tara	
Surat Developmental Road	86B	D	Yes	Tara - Dalby	
Dawson Developmental Road	87A	D	Yes	Springsure - Tambo	
Bowen Developmental Road	88A	D	Yes	Bowen - Collinsville	
Bowen Developmental Road	88B	D	Yes	Collinsville - Belyando Crossing	
Burke Developmental Road (part)	89B	D	Part	Normanton - Dimbulah	
Diamantina Developmental Road (part)	93C	D	Yes	Windorah - Bedourie	
Thomson Developmental Road	95A	D		Windorah - Jundah	
Thomson Developmental Road	95B	D		Jundah - Logreach	
Gregory Developmental Road	98D	D	Yes	The Lynd - Quartz Blow Creek	
Smith Street Connection Road	101	D			
Burleigh Connection Road	102	D			
Southport - Burleigh Road	103	D			
Gold Coast - Springbrook Road	104	D	Yes		
Nerang - Broadbeach Road	105	D			
Southport - Nerang Road (part)	106	D	Yes		
Beenleigh - Redland Bay Road	108	D	Yes		
Cleveland - Redland Bay Road	109	D	Yes		
Redland Bay Road	110	D	Yes		
Mount Cotton Road	111	D	Yes		
Hope Island Road	114	D	Yes		
Labrador - Carrara Road	116	D	Yes		↑ (Top)
Nerang Connection Road	117	D			
Tugun - Currumbin Road	118	D	Yes		
Redcliffe Road (part)	120	D	Yes		
Brighton - Redcliffe Road (part)	122	D	Yes		
Caboolture - Bribie Island Road	126	D	Yes		
Beerburrum Road	127	D	Yes		
Caboolture - Beachmere Road	128	D	Yes		↑ (Top)
Nambour - Bli Bli Road	130	D	Yes		↑ (Top)
Caloundra Road	132	D	Part		
Maroochydore - Noosa Road	133	D	Yes		
Mooloolaba Road	134	D	Yes		
Maroochydore - Mooloolaba Road	135	D	Yes		
Maroochydore Road (part	136	D			
Yandina - Coolum Road	138	D	Yes		
Bells Creek Arterial Road	139	D			
Kin Kin Road	141	D	Yes		
Cooroy - Noosa Road	142	D			
Tin Can Bay Road (part)	143	D	Yes		
Emu Mountain Road (part)	144	D	Yes		
Cooroy Connection Road	145	D	Part		
Caloundra - Mooloolaba Road	151	D		Kawana Way Link Road	
Kawana Way	152	D	Yes		
Nicklin Way	153	D			
Pialba - Burrum Heads Road	162	D	Yes		
Torbanlea - Pialba Road	164	D	Yes		
Goodwood Road	171	D	Yes	Bundaberg - Goodwood	
Elliott Heads Road	172	D	Yes		
Bundaberg - Bargara Road	174	D	Yes		
Bundaberg - Port Road	175	D			
Bundaberg - Gin Gin Road	176	D			
Bundaberg - Miriam Vale Road	179	D	Yes		
Keppel Sands Road	193	D	Yes		
Western Yeppoon - Emu Park Road	197	D	Yes		
Ogmore Connection Road	198	D	Yes	Ogmore Road	
Western Yeppoon - Byfield Road	199	D	Yes	Starts at Tanby Road, ends on Byfield Road	
Springwood Connection Road	200	D	Yes		
Nerang - Murwillumbah Road	201	D	Yes		
Beaudesert - Nerang Road (part)	202	D	Yes		
Beaudesert - Beenleigh Road (part)	203	D			
Brisbane - Beenleigh Road	204	D	Yes	See footnote in Tamborine Mountain road network	
Tamborine Mountain Road	205	D	Yes		
Tamborine - Oxenford Road	206	D	Yes		
Waterford - Tamborine Road	207	D	Yes		
Beenleigh Connection Road	208	D		See footnote in Beaudesert-Beenleigh Road	
Ipswich - Boonah Road (part)	211	D			
Boonah - Rathdowney Road	213	D	Yes		
Warrill View - Peak Crossing Road	216	D	Yes		
Warwick - Yangan Road	222	D	Yes		
Stanthorpe Connection Road	223	D	Yes	High Street / Wallangarra Road	
Stanthorpe - Amosfield Road	224	D	Yes		
Stanthorpe - Texas Road	232	D	Yes		
Stanthorpe - Inglewood Road	234	D	Yes		
Yelarbon - Keetah Road	241	D	Yes		
Ipswich - Warrego Highway Connection Road	302	D	Yes		
Rosewood - Marburg Road	303	D	Yes		
Ipswich - Rosewood Road	304	D	Yes		
Rosewood - Warrill View Road	305	D	Yes		
Rosewood - Laidley Road	308	D	Part		
River Road (Queensland)	309	D		Warrego Hwy - Brisbane Road, Dinmore	
Laidley - Plainland Road	311	D	Part		
Gatton - Laidley Road	312	D	Part		
Gatton - Clifton Road (part)	313	D	Yes		
Gatton - Helidon Road (part)	314	D	Yes		
Charlton Connection Road	320	D			
Drayton Connection Road	321	D		Drayton - New England Highway	
Oakey - Pittsworth Road	323	D			
Toowoomba - Cecil Plains Road	324	D	Part		
Oakey Connection Road	326	D	Part		
Pampas - Horrane Road	327	D	Yes		
Felton - Clifton Road	330	D	Yes		↑ (Top)
Toowoomba - Karara Road	331	D			
Pittsworth - Felton Road	332	D	Yes		
Millmerran - Leyburn Road	335	D	Yes		
Clifton - Leyburn Road	336	D	Yes		
Chinchilla - Tara Road	341	D	Yes		
Condamine - Meandarra Road	345	D	Yes		
Meandarra - Talwood Road	347	D	Yes		
NSW Border - Carnarvon Hwy Conn. Road	348	D	Yes	Collarenebri - Mungindi Road	
Talwood - Boonanga Road	349	D	Yes		
Mitchell - St George Road	355	D	Yes		
Goondiwindi Connection Road	360	D	Yes		
Goondiwindi West Connection Road	362	D	Yes		
Brisbane - Woodford Road (part)	401	D	Yes		
Samford - Mt Glorious Road	402	D	Yes		↑ (Top)
South Pine Road (part)	403	D	Yes		
Esk - Kilcoy Road	405	D	Yes		
Burpengary - Caboolture Road	406	D	Yes		
Samford Road	407	D	Yes		
Wivenhoe - Somerset Road	410	D	Yes		
Coominya Connection Road	411	D	Yes		
Forest Hill - Fernvale Road	412	D	Yes		
Esk - Hampton Road	414	D	Yes		
Oakey - Cooyar Road (part)	417	D			
Pechey - Maclagan Road	418	D	Yes		
Kingaroy - Cooyar Road	419	D	Yes		
Macalister - Bell Road	422	D	Yes		↑ (Top)
Kingaroy - Jandowae Road	424	D	Yes		
Chinchilla - Wondai Road (part)	426	D			
Kingaroy - Burrandowan Road	428	D	Yes		
Nanango - Tarong Road	429	D	Yes		
Wondai - Proston Road	436	D	Yes		
Murgon - Barambah Road	437	D	Yes		
Alpha - Tambo Road	443	D	Yes		
Gavial - Gracemere Road	450	D			
Eidsvold - Theodore Road	454	D	Yes		
Biloela - Duaringa Road	462	D	Yes		
Baralaba - Rannes Road	464	D	Yes		
Blackwater - Rolleston Road	469	D	Yes		
Gladstone - Monto Road	471	D	Yes		
Biloela - Callide Road	472	D	Yes		
Gin Gin - Mount Perry Road	474	D	Yes		
Gayndah - Mount Perry Road	475	D	Yes		
Monto - Mount Perry Road	476	D	Yes		
Booyal - Dallarnil Road	477	D	Yes		
Maryborough - Biggenden Road	478	D	Yes		
Boompa Road	479	D	Yes		
Mary Valley Link Road	480	D	Yes		
Kenilworth - Brooloo Road	481	D			
Tuchekoi Road	482	D	Yes		
Gympie - Brooloo Road	483	D		Mary Valley Road	
Eumundi - Kenilworth Road	484	D			
Kenilworth - Skyring Creek Road	485	D	Yes		
Kilkivan - Tansey Road	486	D	Yes		
Brooweena - Woolooga Road	487	D	Yes		
Bauple - Woolooga Road	488	D	Yes		
Nambour Connection Road	489	D	Part		
Glass House Mountains Road (part)	490	D			
Kilcoy - Murgon Road	491	D	Yes		
Maleny - Stanley River Road	493	D	Yes		
Landsborough - Maleny Road	494	D			
Maleny - Kenilworth Road	495	D			
Nambour - Mapleton Road	496	D	Yes		
Maleny - Montville Road	497	D	Yes		
Woombye - Montville Road	498	D	Yes		
Montville - Mapleton Road	499	D	Yes		
Rockhampton - Ridgelands Road	511	D	Yes		
Marlborough - Sarina Road	512	D	Yes		
Blackwater - Cooroorah Road	513	D	Yes		
Oxford Downs - Sarina Road	514	D	Yes		
Duaringa Connection Road	515	D	Yes		
Sarina - Homebush Road	517	D	Yes		
Glenella Connection Road	530	D	Yes		
Mirani - Eton Road	534	D	Yes		
Mirani - Mount Ossa Road	536	D	Yes		
Ayr - Dalbeg Road	545	D	Yes		
Woodstock - Giru Road	548	D	Part		
Muttaburra - Aramac Road	572	D	Yes		
Barcaldine - Aramac Road	573	D	Yes		
Ross River Road	612	D			
Ingham - Abergowrie Road	614	D	Yes		
Silkwood - Japoon Road	626	D	Part		
Innisfail - Japoon Road (part)	627	D	Yes		
Millaa Millaa - Malanda Road (part)	641	D			
Malanda - Lake Barrine Road	643	D	Yes		
Gordonvale Connection Road	644	D			
Malanda - Atherton Road	645	D			
Malanda - Upper Barron Road	646	D	Yes		
Cairns Western Arterial Road	647	D			
Anderson Street (Queensland)	649	D		Capt Cook Hwy - Cairns Western Art Road	
Mossman - Mount Molloy Road	653	D			
Mossman - Daintree Road	655	D	Part		
Mareeba Connection Road	662	D			
Atherton - Herberton Road	663	D	Yes		
Longlands Gap - Herberton Road	665	D	Yes		
Thursday Island Road	669	D	Yes		
Isisford - Ilfracombe Road	715	D	Yes		
Jundah - Quilpie Road	717	D	Yes		
Ingham - Halifax - Bemerside Road	824	D	Yes		
Townsville Connection Road	830	D	Part		
North Ward Road	833	D	Part		
Garbutt - Upper Ross Road	835	D	Part		↑ (Top)
Angus Smith Drive Connection Road	837	D		Off University Road, Townsville	
Discovery Drive Connection Road	839	D			
Douglas - Garbutt Road	840	D			
Mount Ossa - Seaforth Road	854	D	Yes		
Yakapari - Seaforth Road	855	D	Yes		
Mackay - Slade Point Road (part)	857	D	Yes		
St Lawrence Connection Road	858	D	Yes		
Burpengary Service Road	901	D	Yes		
Linkfield Connection Road	902	D	Yes		
Pacific Highway Connection Road	906	D	Yes	Part of Logan Road	
Cooroy - Gympie Road	914	D			
Pacific Paradise Connection Road	915	D			
Riverview - Moggill Ferry Road	916	D			
East Coast Road	1000	D	Yes	North Stradbroke Island	↑ (Top)
Stapylton - Jacobs Well Road	1003	D	Yes		
Colburn Avenue	1082	D	Yes		
Capalaba - Victoria Point Road	1102	D	Yes		
Birkdale Road (part)	1122	D	Yes		
Pumicestone Road	1204	D	Yes		
Yandina - Bli Bli Road	1305	D	Yes		
Pomona Connection Road	1403	D	Yes		
Gympie Connection Road	1411	D	Yes		
Boreen Road	1412	D	Yes		
Rainbow Beach Road	1413	D	Yes		↑ (Top)
Boreen Point - Tewantin Road	1421	D	Yes		
Burrum Heads Road	1603	D	Yes		
Booral Road	1632	D	Yes		
The Cedars Road	1703	D	Yes	Near Bundaberg	
Innes Park Road	1720	D	Yes		
Burnett Heads Road	1751	D	Yes		
Moore Park Road	1761	D	Yes		
Tannum Sands Road	1805	D	Yes		
Boyne Island Road	1806	D	Yes		
Currumbin Creek Road	2001	D	Yes		
Tallebudgera Creek Road	2003	D	Yes		
Running Creek Road	2005	D	Yes		
Currumbin Creek - Tomewin Road	2011	D	Yes		
Tallebudgera Connection Road	2013	D	Yes		↑ (Top)
Springbrook Road	2015	D	Yes		
Hinze Dam Road	2017	D	Yes		
Beechmont Road	2020	D	Yes		
Binna Burra Road	2021	D	Yes		
Lamington National Park Road	2025	D	Yes		
Oxenford - Coomera Gorge Road	2029	D	Yes		
Advancetown - Mudgeeraba Road	2041	D	Yes		↑ (Top)
Tamborine - Nerang Road	2050	D	Yes		
Camp Cable Road	2071	D	Yes		
Kalbar Connection Road	2102	D	Yes		↑ (Top)
Swanbank Road	2106	D	Part		
Carneys Creek Road	2131	D	Yes		
Maroon Dam Road	2133	D	Yes		
Mount Alford Road	2134	D	Yes		
Lake Moogerah Road	2141	D	Yes		
Moogerah Connection Road	2142	D	Yes		
Freestone Road	2201	D	Yes		
Pyramids Road	2202	D	Yes		
Bracker Road	2210	D	Yes	Warwick	
Spring Creek Road	2214	D	Yes		
Yangan - Killarney Road	2223	D	Yes		
Amiens Road	2301	D	Yes		
Leslie Dam Road	2302	D	Yes		
Texas - Yelarbon Road	2322	D	Yes		
Karrabin - Rosewood Road	3002	D	Yes		
Haigslea - Amberley Road	3041	D	Yes		↑ (Top)
Mount Crosby Road	3042	D	Yes		
Mulgowie Road	3083	D	Part		
Greenmount - Hirstvale Road	3102	D	Yes		
Allora - Goomburra Road	3106	D	Yes		
Mount Sylvia Road	3131	D	Yes		
Bowenville - Norwin Road	3203	D	Yes		
Wyaga Road	3207	D	Yes		
Brookstead - Norwin Road	3221	D	Yes		
Dalrymple Creek Road	3302	D	Yes		
Warwick - Allora Road	3303	D	Yes		
Cambooya Connection Road	3304	D	Yes		
Leyburn - Cunningham Road	3306	D	Yes		
Nobby Connection Road	3308	D	Yes		
Greenmount Connection Road	3341	D	Yes		
Ryeford - Pratten Road	3363	D	Yes		
Tara - Kogan Road	3402	D	Yes		
Warra - Kogan Road	3403	D	Yes		
Wallumbilla South Road	3441	D	Yes		↑ (Top)
Roma - Southern Road	3501	D	Yes		
Charleville - Bollon Road	3601	D	Yes		
Mount Glorious Road	4023	D	Yes		
Strathpine - Samford Road	4032	D	Yes		
Murphys Creek Road	4104	D	Yes		
Bunya Mountains Road	4161	D	Yes		
Bunya Mountains - Maclagan Road	4163	D	Part		
Maidenwell - Bunya Mountains Road	4196	D	Yes		
Warra - Canaga Creek Road	4201	D	Yes		
Kingaroy - Barkers Creek Road	4202	D	Yes		
Memerambi - Gordonbrook Road	4206	D	Yes		
Auburn Road (Queensland)	4261	D	Yes	Chinchilla - Auburn	
Jackson - Wandoan Road	4302	D	Yes		↑ (Top)
Proston - Boondooma Road	4356	D	Yes		
Okeden Road	4364	D	Yes		
Byee Road	4365	D	Yes		
Mitchell - Forestvale Road	4403	D	Yes		
Selma Road	4405	D	Yes	Emerald - Fairbairn Dam	
Cullin - La Ringo Road	4406	D	Yes		
Wuruma Dam Road	4511	D	Yes		
Orion Ten Chain Road	4603	D	Yes		
Glenorina Road	4605	D	Yes	Off Gregory Highway at Gindie	
Comet River Road	4607	D	Yes		
Arcturus Road	4608	D	Yes		
Baralaba - Woorabinda Road	4632	D	Yes		
Kalpowar Road	4702	D	Yes		
Gooroolba - Biggenden Road	4706	D	Yes		
Cania Dam Road	4715	D	Yes		
Gympie - Woolooga Road	4806	D	Yes		
Mungar Road	4807	D	Yes		
Miva Road	4808	D	Yes		
Yabba Creek Road	4832	D	Yes		↑ (Top)
Mooloolah Connection Road	4906	D	Yes		
Obi Obi Road	4962	D	Yes		
Palmwoods - Mooloolah Road	4981	D	Yes		
Duaringa - Apis Creek Road	5101	D	Yes		
Cotherstone Road	5107	D	Yes		
Yan Yan Road	5108	D	Yes		
Retro - Corry Road	5109	D	Yes		
May Downs Road	5122	D	Yes		
St Lawrence - Croydon Road	5124	D	Yes		
Koumala - Bolingbroke Road	5126	D	Yes		
Blue Mountain Road	5127	D	Yes		
Maraju - Yakapari Road	5302	D	Yes		
Collinsville - Elphinstone Road	5307	D	Yes		
Kilcummin - Diamond Downs Road	5309	D	Yes		
Garget - Mia Mia Road	5323	D			
Eungella Dam Road	5324	D	Yes		
North Eton Road	5332	D	Yes		
Mia Mia Connection Road	5342	D			
Crystal Brook Road	5382	D	Yes		
Home Hill - Kirknie Road	5405	D	Yes		
Burdekin Falls Dam Road	5407	D	Yes		
Ayr - Ravenswood Road	5472	D	Yes		
Anakie - Sapphire Road	5501	D	Yes		
Hughenden - Muttaburra Road	5701	D	Yes		
Aramac - Torrens Creek Road	5703	D	Yes		
Cramsie - Muttaburra Road	5705	D	Yes		
Ilfracombe - Aramac Road	5732	D	Yes		↑ (Top)
Richmond - Winton Road	5803	D	Yes		
Julia Creek - Kynuna Road	5807	D	Yes		
Mount Spec Road	6106	D	Yes		
Stone River Road	6141	D	Yes		
Davidson Road	6204	D	Yes	Euramo (on Bruce Highway)	
Tinaroo Falls Dam Road	6425	D	Yes		
Topaz Road	6431	D			
Stratford Connection Road	6472	D		Kamerunga Road (Capt Cook Hwy - Redlynch Bypass Road)	
Port Douglas Road	6504	D	Yes		
Shiptons Flat Road	6507	D	Yes		
Endeavour Valley Road	6601	D			
Tumoulin Road	6605	D	Yes		
Herberton - Petford Road	6632	D	Yes		
Beatrice Way	6701	D	Yes		
Forsayth Road	6704	D	Yes		
Gregory Downs - Camooweal Road	6801	D	Yes		
Hungerford Road	7001	D	Yes		
Quilpie - Thargomindah Road	7003	D	Yes		
Quilpie - Adavale Road	7101	D	Yes		↑ (Top)
Blackall - Adavale Road	7103	D	Yes		
Isisford - Emmet Road	7165	D	Yes		
Cloncurry - Dajarra Road	7708	D	Yes		
Mount Isa - Duchess Road	7709	D	Yes	See footnote in Cloncurry-Dajarra Road	
Pine Creek - Yarrabah Road	8101	D			
Kurrimine Beach Road	8106	D			
El Arish - Mission Beach Road (part)	8108	D	Yes		
Tully - Hull Road	8204	D	Yes		
South Mission Beach Road	8206	D	Yes		
Ingham - Forrest Beach Road	8208	D	Yes		
Halifax - Lucinda Point Road	8241	D	Yes		
Gregory - Cannon Valley Road	8501	D	Yes		
Mackay - Habana Road	8506	D	Yes		
Sarina - Coast Road	8509	D	Yes		
Yakapari - Habana Road	8554	D	Yes		
Eimeo Road	8565	D	Yes		
Yandina South Connection Road	9901	D	Yes		
Yandina North Connection Road	9902	D	Yes		
Nathan Connection Arterial Road	U21	D	Yes	Part of Mains Road	
Sandgate Sub-Arterial Road	U88	D	Yes	Sandgate Road	
Logan Sub-Arterial Road	U90	D	Yes	Part of Logan Road	
Redland Sub-Arterial Road (part)	U91	D	Yes		
Albany Creek Sub-Arterial Road	U94	D	Yes	Albany Creek Road	
Samford Sub-Arterial Road	U95	D	Yes	Samford Road	
Moggill Sub-Arterial Road	U96	D	Yes	Incl Moggill Ferry Road	
Shaw Road	J41	D			
Smithfield Bypass	651				

== See also ==
- List of road routes in Queensland
- List of highways in Queensland
