= Bruce Highway state-controlled roads =

Bruce Highway state-controlled roads presents information about how the Bruce Highway is described for administrative and funding purposes by the Department of Transport & Main Roads, and about the state-controlled roads that intersect with it.

== Overview ==
The Bruce Highway runs from Bald Hills to Cairns in Queensland, Australia. It is a state-controlled road, subdivided into fourteen sections for administrative and funding purposes. All sections are part of the National Highway.

The sections are:

- 10A – Brisbane to Gympie
- 10B – Gympie to Maryborough
- 10C – Maryborough to Gin Gin
- 10D – Gin Gin to Benaraby
- 10E – Benaraby to Rockhampton
- 10F – Rockhampton to St Lawrence
- 10G – St Lawrence to Mackay
- 10H – Mackay to Proserpine
- 10J – Proserpine to Bowen
- 10K – Bowen to Ayr
- 10L – Ayr to Townsville
- 10M – Townsville to Ingham
- 10N – Ingham to Innisfail
- 10P – Innisfail to Cairns

== Intersecting state-controlled roads (Section 10A) ==
The following state-controlled roads intersect with section 10A:

- Redcliffe Road (Anzac Avenue)
- Deception Bay Road
- Burpengary Service Road
- Burpengary–Caboolture Road
- Caboolture Connection Road
- Caboolture–Bribie Island Road
- D'Aguilar Highway
- Pumicestone Road
- Steve Irwin Way
- Bells Creek Arterial Road
- Caloundra Road
- Sunshine Motorway
- Nambour Connection Road
- Maroochydore Road
- Nambour–Bli Bli Road
- Yandina–Coolum Road
- Eumundi–Noosa Road
- Eumundi–Kenilworth Road
- Cooroy Connection Road
- Pomona Connection Road
- Cooroy–Gympie Road
- Mary Valley Link Road
- Tin Can Bay Road
- Gympie–Woolooga Road
- Gympie Connection Road

== Intersecting state-controlled roads (Section 10B) ==
The following state-controlled roads intersect with section 10B:

- Wide Bay Highway
- Miva Road
- Bauple–Woolooga Road
- Mungar Road
- Maryborough–Hervey Bay Road
- Maryborough–Biggenden Road

== Intersecting state-controlled roads (Section 10C) ==
The following state-controlled roads intersect with section 10C:

- Torbanlea–Pialba Road
- Goodwood Road
- Isis Highway
- Booyal–Dallarnil Road
- Bundaberg–Gin Gin Road

=== Booyal–Dallarnil Road ===
Booyal–Dallarnil Road
- Location: Bruce Highway, Booyal to Isis Highway, Dallarnil
- Length: 18.2 km (11.3 mi)

Booyal–Dallarnil Road is a state-controlled district road (number 477), rated as a local road of regional significance (LRRS). It runs from the Bruce Highway in Booyal to the Isis Highway in Dallarnil, a distance of 18.2 kilometres (11.3 mi). It does not intersect with any state-controlled roads.

== Intersecting state-controlled roads (Section 10D) ==
The following state-controlled roads intersect with section 10D:

- Gin Gin–Mount Perry Road
- Kalpowar Road
- Bundaberg–Miriam Vale Road
- Tannum Sands Road
- Gladstone–Benaraby Road

=== Tannum Sands Road ===
Tannum Sands Road
- Location: Bruce Highway, Tannum Sands to Ocean Street, Tannum Sands
- Length: 9.1 km (5.7 mi)

Tannum Sands Road is a state-controlled district road (number 1805), rated as a local road of regional significance (LRRS). It runs from the Bruce Highway in Tannum Sands to Ocean Street in Tannum Sands, a distance of 9.1 kilometres (5.7 mi). It intersects with Boyne Island Road in Tannum Sands.

== Intersecting state-controlled roads (Section 10E) ==
The following state-controlled roads intersect with section 10E:

- Dawson Highway
- Gladstone–Mount Larcom Road
- Bajool–Port Alma Road
- Gavial–Gracemere Road
- Burnett Highway
- Capricorn Highway
- Rockhampton–Yeppoon Road

=== Bajool–Port Alma Road ===
Bajool–Port Alma Road
- Location: Bruce Highway, Bajool to Port Alma jetty
- Length: 25.1 km (15.6 mi)

Bajool–Port Alma Road is a state-controlled regional road (number 188). It runs from the Bruce Highway in Bajool to the Port Alma jetty, a distance of 25.1 kilometres (15.6 mi). It does not intersect with any state-controlled road.

A project to widen pavement and improve safety, at a cost of $14.5 million, was completed in August 2023.

== Intersecting state-controlled roads (Section 10F) ==
The following state-controlled roads intersect with section 10F:

- Rockhampton–Ridgelands Road
- Marlborough–Sarina Road
- Ogmore Connection Road
- St Lawrence–Croydon Road
- St Lawrence Connection Road

=== Rockhampton–Ridgelands Road ===
Rockhampton–Ridgelands Road
- Location: Bruce Highway, Rockhampton City to Glenroy Road, Ridgelands
- Length: 28.8 km (17.9 mi)

Rockhampton–Ridgelands Road is a state-controlled district road (number 511), rated as a local road of regional significance (LRRS). It runs from the Bruce Highway in Rockhampton City to Glenroy Road in Ridgelands, a distance of 28.8 kilometres (17.9 mi). It does not intersect with any state-controlled road.

=== Ogmore Connection Road ===
Ogmore Connection Road
- Location: Bruce Highway, Ogmore to Dempsey Street, Ogmore
- Length: 11.0 km (6.8 mi)

Ogmore Connection Road is a state-controlled district road (number 198), rated as a local road of regional significance (LRRS). It runs from the Bruce Highway in Ogmore to Dempsey Street in Ogmore, a distance of 11.0 kilometres (6.8 mi). It does not intersect with any state-controlled road.

== Intersecting state-controlled roads (Section 10G) ==
The following state-controlled roads intersect with section 10G:

- Koumala–Bolingbroke Road
- Sarina–Coast Road
- Sarina–Homebush Road
- Hay Point Road
- Homebush Road
- Mackay Ring Road
- Peak Downs Highway
- Glenella Connection Road
- Mackay–Slade Point Road

=== Sarina–Coast Road ===
Sarina–Coast Road
- Location: Bruce Highway, Sarina to Owen Jenkins Drive, Sarina Beach
- Length: 13.0 km (8.1 mi)

Sarina–Coast Road is a state-controlled district road (number 8509), rated as a local road of regional significance (LRRS). It runs from the Bruce Highway in Sarina to Owen Jenkins Drive in Sarina Beach, a distance of 13.0 kilometres (8.1 mi). It does not intersect with any state-controlled road.

=== Hay Point Road ===
Hay Point Road
- Location: Bruce Highway, Alligator Creek to the Esplanade, Hay Point
- Length: 13.9 km (8.6 mi)

Hay Point Road is a state-controlled regional road (number 852). It runs from the Bruce Highway in Alligator Creek to the Esplanade in Hay Point, a distance of 13.9 kilometres (8.6 mi). It does not intersect with any state-controlled road.

== Intersecting state-controlled roads (Section 10H) ==
The following state-controlled roads intersect with section 10H:

- Rockleigh–North Mackay Road
- Maraju–Yakapari Road
- Mackay–Bucasia Road
- Yakapari–Seaforth Road
- Marian–Hampden Road
- Mount Ossa–Seaforth Road
- Mirani–Mount Ossa Road
- Crystal Brook Road

=== Yakapari–Seaforth Road ===
Yakapari–Seaforth Road
- Location: Bruce Highway, The Leap to Palm Avenue, Seaforth
- Length: 23.3 km (14.5 mi)

Yakapari–Seaforth Road is a state-controlled district road (number 855), rated as a local road of regional significance (LRRS). It runs from the Bruce Highway in The Leap to Palm Avenue in Seaforth, a distance of 23.3 kilometres (14.5 mi). It intersects with Yakapari–Habana Road in The Leap and with Mt Ossa–Seaforth Road in Seaforth.

=== Mount Ossa–Seaforth Road ===
Mount Ossa–Seaforth Road
- Location: Bruce Highway, Mount Ossa, to Yakapari–Seaforth Road, Seaforth
- Length: 15.5 km (9.6 mi)

Mount Ossa–Seaforth Road is a state-controlled district road (number 854), rated as a local road of regional significance (LRRS). It runs from the Bruce Highway in Mount Ossa to Yakapari–Seaforth Road in Seaforth, a distance of 15.5 kilometres (9.6 mi). It does not intersect with any state-controlled road.

=== Mirani–Mount Ossa Road ===
Mirani–Mount Ossa Road
- Location: Mackay–Eungella Road, Mirani, via Mount Charlton, to Bruce Highway, Mount Ossa
- Length: 38.3 km (23.8 mi)

Mirani–Mount Ossa Road is a state-controlled district road (number 536), rated as a local road of regional significance (LRRS). It runs from Mackay–Eungella Road in Mirani, via Mount Charlton, to the Bruce Highway in Mount Ossa, a distance of 38.3 kilometres (23.8 mi). It does not intersect with any state-controlled road.

=== Crystal Brook Road ===
Crystal Brook Road
- Location: Bruce Highway, Proserpine to Peter Faust Dam, Lake Proserpine
- Length: 27.7 km (17.2 mi)

Crystal Brook Road is a state-controlled district road (number 5382), rated as a local road of regional significance (LRRS). It runs from the Bruce Highway in Proserpine to the Peter Faust Dam in Lake Proserpine, a distance of 27.7 kilometres (17.2 mi). It does not intersect with any state-controlled road.

== Intersecting state-controlled roads (Section 10J) ==
The following state-controlled roads intersect with section 10J:

- Proserpine–Shute Harbour Road
- Gregory–Cannon Valley Road
- Bowen Developmental Road

== Intersecting state-controlled roads (Section 10K) ==
The following state-controlled roads intersect with section 10K:

- Home Hill–Kirknie Road
- Ayr–Dalbeg Road

=== Home Hill–Kirknie Road ===
Home Hill–Kirknie Road
- Location: Bruce Highway, Home Hill to Kirknie Road, Kirknie
- Length: 31.5 km (19.6 mi)

Home Hill–Kirknie Road is a state-controlled district road (number 5405), rated as a local road of regional significance (LRRS). It runs from the Bruce Highway in Home Hill to Kirknie Road in Kirknie, a distance of 31.5 kilometres (19.6 mi). It does not intersect with any state-controlled road.

=== Ayr–Dalbeg Road ===
Ayr–Dalbeg Road
- Location: Bruce Highway, Ayr to Stockyard Road, Dalbeg
- Length: 85.8 km (53.3 mi)

Ayr–Dalbeg Road is a state-controlled district road (number 545), rated as a local road of regional significance (LRRS). It runs from the Bruce Highway in Ayr to Stockyard Road in Dalbeg, a distance of 85.8 kilometres (53.3 mi). It intersects with Ayr–Ravenswood Road in Clare.

== Intersecting state-controlled roads (Section 10L) ==
The following state-controlled roads intersect with section 10L:

- Woodstock–Giru Road
- Flinders Highway
- Townsville Port Road

=== Woodstock–Giru Road ===
Woodstock–Giru Road
- Location: Flinders Highway, Woodstock to Barbat Street, Giru
- Length: 35.6 km (22.1 mi)

Woodstock–Giru Road is a state-controlled district road (number 548), part of which is rated as a local road of regional significance (LRRS). It runs from the Flinders Highway in Woodstock to Barbat Street in Giru, a distance of 35.6 kilometres (22.1 mi). It intersects with the Bruce Highway in Giru.

== Intersecting state-controlled roads (Section 10M) ==
The following state-controlled roads intersect with section 10M:

- South Townsville Road
- Townsville Connection Road
- Douglas–Garbutt Road
- Angus Smith Drive Connection Road
- Garbutt–Upper Ross Road
- Herveys Range Developmental Road
- Shaw Road
- North Townsville Road
- Mount Spec Road
- Ingham–Abergowrie Road

=== Mount Spec Road ===
Mount Spec Road
- Location: Bruce Highway, Mutarnee to Mt Spec Road, Paluma
- Length: 21.5 km (13.4 mi)

Mount Spec Road is a state-controlled district road (number 6106), rated as a local road of regional significance (LRRS). It runs from the Bruce Highway in Mutarnee to Mt Spec Road in Paluma, a distance of 21.5 kilometres (13.4 mi). It does not intersect with any state-controlled road.

=== Ingham–Abergowrie Road ===
Ingham–Abergowrie Road
- Location: Bruce Highway, Ingham to Abergowrie Road, Abergowrie
- Length: 38.2 km (23.7 mi)

Ingham–Abergowrie Road is a state-controlled district road (number 614), rated as a local road of regional significance (LRRS). It runs from the Bruce Highway in Ingham to Abergowrie Road in Abergowrie, a distance of 38.2 kilometres (23.7 mi). It intersects with Stone River Road in Trebonne.

== Intersecting state-controlled roads (Section 10N) ==
The following state-controlled roads intersect with section 10N:

- Ingham–Forrest Beach Road
- Ingham–Halifax–Bemerside Road
- Davidson Road
- Tully–Hull Road
- Tully–Mission Beach Road
- El Arish–Mission Beach Road
- Kurrimine Beach Road
- Silkwood–Japoon Road
- South Johnstone Road
- Boogan Road
- Mourilyan Harbour Road
- Innisfail–Japoon Road

=== Ingham–Forrest Beach Road ===
Ingham–Forrest Beach Road
- Location: Bruce Highway, Ingham to Palm Street, Allingham
- Length: 19.6 km (12.2 mi)

Ingham–Forrest Beach Road is a state-controlled district road (number 8208), rated as a local road of regional significance (LRRS). It runs from the Bruce Highway in Ingham to Palm Street in Allingham, a distance of 19.6 kilometres (12.2 mi). It does not intersect with any state-controlled road.

=== Ingham–Halifax–Bemerside Road ===
Ingham–Halifax–Bemerside Road
- Location: Bruce Highway, Ingham, via Halifax, to Bruce Highway, Bemerside
- Length: 26.9 km (16.7 mi)

Ingham–Halifax–Bemerside Road is a state-controlled district road (number 824), rated as a local road of regional significance (LRRS). It runs from the Bruce Highway in Ingham, via Halifax to the Bruce Highway in Bemerside, a distance of 26.9 kilometres (16.7 mi). It intersects with Halifax–Lucinda Point Road in Halifax.

=== Davidson Road ===
Davidson Road
- Location: Bruce Highway, Euramo to Davidson Road, Munro Plains
- Length: 18.8 km (11.7 mi)

Davidson Road is a state-controlled district road (number 6204), rated as a local road of regional significance (LRRS). It runs from the Bruce Highway in Euramo to Davidson Road (which continues as a local road) in Munro Plains, a distance of 18.8 kilometres (11.7 mi). It does not intersect with any state-controlled road.

=== Tully–Hull Road ===
Tully–Hull Road
- Location: Bruce Highway, Silky Oak to Niblett Street, Hull Heads
- Length: 14.7 km (9.1 mi)

Tully–Hull Road is a state-controlled district road (number 8204), rated as a local road of regional significance (LRRS). It runs from the Bruce Highway in Silky Oak to Niblett Street in Hull Heads, a distance of 14.7 kilometres (9.1 mi). It does not intersect with any state-controlled road.

=== Tully–Mission Beach Road ===
Tully–Mission Beach Road
- Location: Bruce Highway, Birkalla to El Arish–Mission Beach Road, Mission Beach
- Length: 23.0 km (14.3 mi)

Tully–Mission Beach Road is a state-controlled regional road (number 8202). It runs from the Bruce Highway in Birkalla to El Arish–Mission Beach Road in Mission Beach, a distance of 23.0 kilometres (14.3 mi). It intersects with South Mission Beach Road in South Mission Beach.

=== El Arish–Mission Beach Road ===
El Arish–Mission Beach Road
- Location: Bruce Highway, El Arish to Alexander Drive, Mission Beach
- Length: 18.4 km (11.4 mi)

El Arish–Mission Beach Road is a state-controlled road (number 8108), part regional and part district, with the district part rated as a local road of regional significance (LRRS). It runs from the Bruce Highway in El Arish to Alexander Drive in Mission Beach, a distance of 18.4 kilometres (11.4 mi). It intersects with Tully–Mission Beach Road in Mission Beach.

=== Kurrimine Beach Road ===
Kurrimine Beach Road
- Location: Bruce Highway, Silkwood to Robert Johnstone Parade, Kurrimine Beach
- Length: 9.9 km (6.2 mi)

Kurrimine Beach Road (Murdering Point Road) is a state-controlled district road (number 8106). It runs from the Bruce Highway in Silkwood to Robert Johnstone Parade in Kurrimine Beach, a distance of 9.9 kilometres (6.2 mi). It does not intersect with any state-controlled road.

=== Silkwood–Japoon Road ===
Silkwood–Japoon Road
- Location: Bruce Highway, Silkwood to Innisfail–Japoon Road, Japoonvale
- Length: 13.6 km (8.5 mi)

Silkwood–Japoon Road is a state-controlled district road (number 626), part of which is rated as a local road of regional significance (LRRS). It runs from the Bruce Highway in Silkwood to Innisfail–Japoon Road in Japoonvale, a distance of 13.6 kilometres (8.5 mi). It does not intersect with any state-controlled road.

=== South Johnstone Road ===
South Johnstone Road
- Location: Bruce Highway, Boogan to Innisfail–Japoon Road, South Johnstone
- Length: 5.5 km (3.4 mi)

South Johnstone Road is a state-controlled regional road (number 6274). It runs from the Bruce Highway in Boogan to Innisfail–Japoon Road in South Johnstone, a distance of 5.5 kilometres (3.4 mi). It intersects with Boogan Road in Boogan.

=== Boogan Road ===
Boogan Road
- Location: Bruce Highway, Mourilyan to South Johnstone Road, Boogan
- Length: 3.0 km (1.9 mi)

Boogan Road is a state-controlled regional road (number 6272), rated as a local road of regional significance (LRRS). It runs from the Bruce Highway in Mourilyan to South Johnstone Road in Boogan, a distance of 3.0 kilometres (1.9 mi). It does not intersect with any state-controlled road.

A project to widen and strengthen pavement, at a cost of $7.1 million, was completed in September 2022.

=== Mourilyan Harbour Road ===
Mourilyan Harbour Road
- Location: Bruce Highway, Mourilyan to Johnstone Street, Mourilyan Harbour
- Length: 9.2 km (5.7 mi)

Mourilyan Harbour Road is a state-controlled regional road (number 814). It runs from the Bruce Highway in Mourilyan to Johnstone Street in Mourilyan Harbour, a distance of 9.2 kilometres (5.7 mi). It does not intersect with any state-controlled road.

=== Innisfail–Japoon Road ===
Innisfail–Japoon Road
- Location: Bruce Highway, Mighell to silkwood–Japoon Road, Japoonvale
- Length: 26.8 km (16.7 mi)

Silkwood–Japoon Road is a state-controlled road (number 627), part regional and part district, of which the district part is rated as a local road of regional significance (LRRS). It runs from the Bruce Highway in Mighell to Silkwood–Japoon Road in Japoonvale, a distance of 26.8 kilometres (16.7 mi). It intersects with Henderson Drive in Wangan and with South Johnstone Road in South Johnstone.

== Intersecting state-controlled roads (Section 10P) ==
The following state-controlled roads intersect with section 10P:

- Palmerston Highway
- Gillies Range Road
- Pine Creek–Yarrabah Road
- Mulgrave Road
- Port Connection Road

=== Pine Creek–Yarrabah Road ===
Pine Creek–Yarrabah Road
- Location: Bruce Highway, Gordonvale to the Yarrabah Aboriginal Community, Yarrabah
- Length: 28.8 km (17.9 mi)

Pine Creek–Yarrabah Road is a state-controlled district road (number 8101). It runs from the Bruce Highway in Gordonvale to the Yarrabah Aboriginal Community in Yarrabah, a distance of 28.8 kilometres (17.9 mi). It does not intersect with any state-controlled road.

== Associated state-controlled roads ==
The following state-controlled roads, not described in another article, are associated with the intersecting roads described above, or their terminating roads:

- Yakapari–Habana Road
- Ayr–Ravenswood Road
- Burdekin Falls Dam Road
- Stone River Road
- Halifax–Lucinda Point Road
- South Mission Beach Road
- Henderson Drive

=== Yakapari–Habana Road ===
Yakapari–Habana Road
- Location: Yakapari–Seaforth Road, The Leap to Mackay–Habana Road, Habana
- Length: 10.2 km (6.3 mi)

Yakapari–Habana Road is a state-controlled district road (number 8554), rated as a local road of regional significance (LRRS). It runs from Yakapari–Seaforth Road in The Leap to Mackay–Habana Road in Habana, a distance of 10.2 kilometres (6.3 mi). It does not intersect with any state-controlled road.

=== Ayr–Ravenswood Road ===
Ayr–Ravenswood Road
- Location: Ayr–Dalbeg Road, Clare to Burdekin Falls Dam Road, Ravenswood
- Length: 57.2 km (35.5 mi)

Ayr–Ravenswood Road is a state-controlled district road (number 5472), rated as a local road of regional significance (LRRS). It runs from Ayr–Dalbeg Road in Clare to Burdekin Falls Dam Road in Ravenswood, a distance of 57.2 kilometres (35.5 mi). It does not intersect with any state-controlled road.

=== Burdekin Falls Dam Road ===
Burdekin Falls Dam Road
- Location: Flinders Highway, Mingela to Burdekin Falls Dam, Ravenswood
- Length: 122 km (76 mi)

Burdekin Falls Dam Road is a state-controlled district road (number 5407), rated as a local road of regional significance (LRRS). It runs from the Flinders Highway in Mingela to Burdekin Falls Dam in Ravenswood, a distance of 122 kilometres (76 mi). It intersects with Ayr–Ravenswood Road in Ravenswood.

=== Stone River Road ===
Stone River Road
- Location: Ingham–Abergowrie Road, Trebonne to Baillies Road, Upper Stone
- Length: 25.6 km (15.9 mi)

Stone River Road is a state-controlled district road (number 6141), rated as a local road of regional significance (LRRS). It runs from Ingham–Abergowrie Road in Trebonne to Baillies Road in Upper Stone, a distance of 25.6 kilometres (15.9 mi). It does not intersect with any state-controlled road.

=== Halifax–Lucinda Point Road ===
Halifax–Lucinda Point Road
- Location: Ingham–Halifax–Bemerside Road, Halifax to Borello Park, Lucinda
- Length: 9.1 km (5.7 mi)

Halifax–Lucinda Point Road is a state-controlled district road (number 8241), rated as a local road of regional significance (LRRS). It runs from Ingham–Halifax–Bemerside Road in Halifax to Borello Park in Lucinda, a distance of 9.1 kilometres (5.7 mi). It does not intersect with any state-controlled road.

=== South Mission Beach Road ===
South Mission Beach Road
- Location: Tully–Mission Beach Road, Wongaling Beach to Kennedy Esplanade, South Mission Beach
- Length: 3.3 km (2.1 mi)

South Mission Beach Road is a state-controlled district road (number 8206), rated as a local road of regional significance (LRRS). It runs from Tully–Mission Beach Road in Wongaling Beach to Kennedy Esplanade in South Mission Beach, a distance of 3.3 kilometres (2.1 mi). It does not intersect with any state-controlled road.

=== Henderson Drive ===
Henderson Drive
- Location: Innisfail–Japoon Road, Wangan to Palmerston Highway, Pin Gin Hill
- Length: 6.6 km (4.1 mi)

Henderson Drive is a state-controlled regional road (number 628). It runs from Innisfail–Japoon Road in Wangan to the Palmerston Highway in Pin Gin Hill, a distance of 6.6 kilometres (4.1 mi). It does not intersect with any state-controlled road.

== See also ==
- List of numbered roads in Queensland
