= New England Highway state-controlled roads in Queensland =

New England Highway state-controlled roads in Queensland presents information about how the Queensland segment of the New England Highway is described for administrative and funding purposes by the Queensland Department of Transport and Main Roads, and about the state-controlled roads that intersect with it.

== Overview ==
The Queensland segment of the New England Highway runs from Yarraman to Wallangarra in Queensland, Australia. It is a state-controlled road, subdivided into three sections for administrative and funding purposes. One of the three sections (number 22C) is part of the National Highway, while sections 22A and 22B are strategic roads. The sections are:

- 22A – Yarraman to Toowoomba
- 22B – Toowoomba to Warwick
- 22C – Warwick to Wallangarra

== Intersecting state-controlled roads (Section 22A) ==
The following state-controlled roads intersect with section 22A:

- Kingaroy–Cooyar Road
- Oakey–Cooyar Road
- Pechey–Maclagan Road
- Esk–Hampton Road
- Murphys Creek Road
- Toowoomba Connection Road (former Warrego Highway)

== Status of Toowoomba Roads ==
The New England Highway does not intersect with the Toowoomba Second Range Crossing, but traffic can transition between them via the Hermitage Road intersection.

== Intersecting state-controlled roads (Section 22B) ==
The following state-controlled roads intersect with section 22B:

- Drayton Connection Road
- Cambooya Connection Road
- Greenmount Connection Road
- Greenmount–Hirstvale Road
- Nobby Connection Road
- Gatton–Clifton Road
- Dalrymple Creek Road
- Allora–Goomburra Road
- Cunningham Highway

Details of above roads not described in another article are shown below.

=== Drayton Connection Road ===
Drayton Connection Road
- Location: New England Highway, Vale View to Toowoomba Athol Road, Drayton
- Length: 11.2 km (7.0 mi)

Drayton Connection Road is a state-controlled district road (number 321). It runs from the New England Highway in Vale View to Toowoomba Athol Road in Drayton, a distance of 11.2 kilometres (7.0 mi). It does not intersect with any state-controlled roads.

=== Greenmount Connection Road ===
Greenmount Connection Road
- Location: New England Highway, East Greenmount to Greenmount–Nobby Road, Greenmount
- Length: 4.2 km (2.6 mi)

Greenmount Connection Road (Greenmount–Clifton Road) is a state-controlled district road (number 3341), rated as a local road of regional significance (LRRS). It runs from the New England Highway in East Greenmount to Greenmount–Nobby Road in Greenmount, a distance of 4.2 kilometres (2.6 mi). It does not intersect with any state-controlled roads.

=== Nobby Connection Road ===
Nobby Connection Road
- Location: New England Highway, Nobby to Felton–Clifton Road, Nobby
- Length: 5.1 km (3.2 mi)

Nobby Connection Road is a state-controlled district road (number 3308), rated as a local road of regional significance (LRRS). It runs from the New England Highway in Nobby to Felton–Clifton Road in Nobby, a distance of 5.1 kilometres (3.2 mi). It does not intersect with any state-controlled roads.

=== Dalrymple Creek Road ===
Dalrymple Creek Road
- Location: New England Highway, Allora to Ryeford–Pratten Road, Victoria Hill
- Length: 25.7 km (16.0 mi)

Dalrymple Creek Road is a state-controlled district road (number 3302), rated as a local road of regional significance (LRRS). It runs from the New England Highway in Allora to Ryeford–Pratten Road in Victoria Hill, a distance of 25.7 kilometres (16.0 mi). It intersects with Warwick–Allora Road in Allora.

=== Allora–Goomburra Road ===
Allora–Goomburra Road
- Location: New England Highway, Allora to Inverramsay Road, Goomburra
- Length: 10.8 km (6.7 mi)

Allora–Goomburra Road is a state-controlled district road (number 3106), rated as a local road of regional significance (LRRS). It runs from the New England Highway in Allora to Inverramsay Road in Goomburra, a distance of 10.8 kilometres (6.7 mi). It does not intersect with any state-controlled roads.

== Intersecting state-controlled roads (Section 22C) ==
The following state-controlled roads intersect with section 22C:

- Bracker Road
- Amiens Road
- Stanthorpe Connection Road
- Pyramids Road

Details of above roads not described in another article are shown below.

=== Bracker Road ===
Bracker Road
- Location: New England Highway, Warwick to Warwick–Killarney Road, Warwick
- Length: 2.0 km (1.2 mi)

Bracker Road is a state-controlled district road (number 2210), rated as a local road of regional significance (LRRS). It runs from the New England Highway in Warwick to Warwick–Killarney Road in Warwick, a distance of 2.0 kilometres (1.2 mi). It does not intersect with any state-controlled roads.

=== Amiens Road ===
Amiens Road
- Location: New England Highway, Thulimbah to Goldfields Road, Amiens
- Length: 19.3 km (12.0 mi)

Amiens Road is a state-controlled district road (number 2301), rated as a local road of regional significance (LRRS). It runs from the New England Highway in Thulimbah to Goldfields Road in Amiens, a distance of 19.3 kilometres (12.0 mi). It does not intersect with any state-controlled roads.

=== Stanthorpe Connection Road ===
Stanthorpe Connection Road
- Location: New England Highway, Stanthorpe to New England Highway, Stanthorpe
- Length: 5.4 km (3.4 mi)

Stanthorpe Connection Road is a state-controlled district road (number 223), rated as a local road of regional significance (LRRS). It runs from the New England Highway in Stanthorpe to New England Highway (further south) in Stanthorpe, a distance of 5.4 kilometres (3.4 mi). It intersects with Stanthorpe–Amosfield Road and Stanthorpe–Texas Road in Stanthorpe.

=== Pyramids Road ===
Pyramids Road
- Location: New England Highway, Wyberba to Pyramids Road, Girraween
- Length: 6.7 km (4.2 mi)

Pyramids Road is a state-controlled district road (number 2202), rated as a local road of regional significance (LRRS). It runs from the New England Highway in Wyberba to Pyramids Road in Girraween (Girraween National Park), a distance of 6.7 kilometres (4.2 mi). It does not intersect with any state-controlled roads.

== Status of Warwick and Stanthorpe roads ==
The New England Highway runs from Glengallan to Warwick concurrent with the Cunningham Highway. State-controlled roads that intersect with that section of road are not included in this article.

The New England Highway does not intersect with Stanthorpe–Texas Road, but traffic can transition between them via Pancor Road.

== Associated state-controlled road ==
The following state-controlled road, not described in another article, is associated with an intersecting road described above:

=== Stanthorpe–Amosfield Road ===
Stanthorpe–Amosfield Road
- Location: Stanthorpe Connection Road, Stanthorpe to the New South Wales border, Dalcouth
- Length: 5.8 km (3.6 mi)

Stanthorpe–Amosfield Road is a state-controlled district road (number 224), rated as a local road of regional significance (LRRS). It runs from Stanthorpe Connection Road in Stanthorpe to the New South Wales border in Dalcouth, a distance of 5.8 kilometres (3.6 mi). It does not intersect with any state-controlled roads.

== See also ==
- List of numbered roads in Queensland
