= Mount Lindesay Highway state-controlled roads =

Mount Lindesay Highway state-controlled roads presents information about how the Mount Lindesay Highway is described for administrative and funding purposes by the Queensland Department of Transport and Main Roads, and about the state-controlled roads that intersect with it.

== Overview ==
The Mount Lindesay Highway runs from Drewvale to Mount Lindesay in Queensland, Australia. It is a state-controlled road, subdivided into two sections for administrative and funding purposes. Section 25A is a regional road, while section 25B is part regional and part district. The sections are:

- 25A – Drewvale to Beaudesert
- 25B – Beaudesert to Mount Lindesay

== Intersecting state-controlled roads (Section 25A) ==
The following state-controlled roads intersect with section 25A:

- Camp Cable Road
- Beaudesert–Boonah Road

=== Camp Cable Road ===
Camp Cable Road
- Location: Mount Lindesay Highway, Jimboomba to Waterford–Tamborine Road, Yarrabilba
- Length: 7.2 km (4.5 mi)

Camp Cable Road is a state-controlled district road (number 2071), rated as a local road of regional significance (LRRS). It runs from the Mount Lindesay Highway in Jimboomba to Waterford–Tamborine Road in Yarrabilba, a distance of 7.2 kilometres (4.5 mi). It does not intersect with any state-controlled roads.

== Intersecting state-controlled roads (Section 25B) ==
The following state-controlled roads intersect with section 25B:

- Beaudesert–Nerang Road
- Running Creek Road
- Boonah–Rathdowney Road

=== Running Creek Road ===
Running Creek Road
- Location: Mount Lindesay Highway, Rathdowney to Lions Road, Running Creek (NSW border)
- Length: 23.6 km (14.7 mi)

Running Creek Road is a state-controlled district road (number 2005), rated as a local road of regional significance (LRRS). It runs from the Mount Lindesay Highway in Rathdowney to the NSW border on Lions Road in Running Creek, a distance of 23.6 kilometres (14.7 mi). It does not intersect with any state-controlled roads.

== Associated state-controlled roads ==
The following state-controlled roads, not described in another article, are associated with the intersecting roads described above:

- Maroon Dam Road
- Carneys Creek Road

=== Maroon Dam Road ===
Maroon Dam Road
- Location: Boonah–Rathdowney Road, Maroon to Maroon Dam wall, Maroon
- Length: 2.5 km (1.6 mi)

Maroon Dam Road is a state-controlled district road (number 2133), rated as a local road of regional significance (LRRS). It runs from Boonah–Rathdowney Road in Maroon to the Maroon Dam wall in Maroon, a distance of 2.5 kilometres (1.6 mi). It does not intersect with any state-controlled roads.

=== Carneys Creek Road ===
Carneys Creek Road
- Location: Boonah–Rathdowney Road, Coochin to Carneys Creek Road, Carneys Creek (NSW border)
- Length: 28.2 km (17.5 mi)

Carneys Creek Road is a state-controlled district road (number 2131), rated as a local road of regional significance (LRRS). It runs from Boonah–Rathdowney Road in Coochin to the NSW border (White Swamp Gate) on Carneys Creek Road in Carneys Creek a distance of 28.2 kilometres (17.5 mi). It does not intersect with any state-controlled roads.

== See also ==
- List of numbered roads in Queensland
