= Blackall–Jericho Road =

Road in Queensland, Australia

Blackall–Jericho Road Queensland

General information
- Type: Rural road
- Length: 121 km (75 mi)

Major junctions
- South-west end: Landsborough Highway, Blackall
- Narbethong Road
- North-east end: Capricorn Highway, Jericho

Blackall–Jericho Road is a continuous 121-kilometre (75 mi) road route in the Blackall-Tambo and Barcaldine local government areas of Queensland, Australia. It is a state-controlled regional road (number 441), rated as a local road of regional significance (LRRS).

== Route description ==
The road commences as Clematis Street at an intersection with the Landsborough Highway (known as Shamrock Street) in Blackall, in the Blackall-Tambo region. It runs north-east before turning east as Ivy Street, which becomes Blackall–Jericho Road as it leaves the town. It turns north-east and continues to the locality and regional boundary, where it enters the former locality of Mexico, now a part of the locality of Jericho, in the Barcaldine region. While passing through Blackall the road runs through the village of Yalleroi and passes the exit to Narbethong Road to the north-west. Continuing north-east to the town of Jericho the road enters from the west as Davy Street, turns north as Edison Street, and ends at an intersection with the Capricorn Highway (known as Darwin Street).

The road is now fully sealed, with the last 15 kilometres (9.3 mi) completed in March 2022.

For travel to and from the Blackall district this road is part of the shortest route to east coast centres from Bundaberg to Bowen It is 73 kilometres (45 mi) shorter than travelling on highways via Barcaldine.

== History ==
The Blackall region was explored in 1846 by explorer Sir Thomas Mitchell and his party. In 1856, Augustus Gregory passed through the area noting that the landscape was a vast plain lacking vegetation, in contrast to Mitchell's description of good country. Blackall was named by Surveyor Abraham H. May after Sir Samuel Blackall, the second Governor of Queensland.

During the 1860s Blackall developed as a service centre for the surrounding pastoral properties. A survey of town allotments was conducted in 1868. The dominant industry in the area is grazing with over 70 homesteads reported to be in the district in 2020. A substantial number of these properties are adjacent to or accessed from Blackall–Jericho Road. One such property is Paradise Downs, which welcomes tourists for guided tours and sightseeing.

Yalleroi pastoral run is believed to have been established in the 1870s.

It is believed there was a pastoral run called Mexico in the 1880s in the area to the south of Jericho.

The first exploration of the Jericho area by Europeans was also by Major Thomas Mitchell who passed through in 1846. By the 1850s settlers had moved in.

When the first survey for the Jericho to Blackall railway line was done in 1884 the road did not exist. The railway was approved in 1905 and opened in 1908. It was closed in 2005 as it could no longer compete with road transport.

== Major intersections ==
All distances are from Google Maps.

LGA	Location	km	mi	Destinations	Notes
Blackall-Tambo	Blackall	0	0.0	Landsborough Highway – south-east – Tambo – north-west – Barcaldine	South-western end of Blackall–Jericho Road. Road continues north-east as Clematis Street.
Blackall-Tambo	Blackall	79.1	49.2	Narbethong Road – north-west – Narbethong, Landsborough Highway	Road continues north-east.
Barcaldine	Jericho	121.0	75.2	Capricorn Highway – west – Barcaldine – east – Alpha.	North-eastern end of Blackall–Jericho Road.
1.000 mi = 1.609 km; 1.000 km = 0.621 mi

== See also ==
- List of numbered roads in Queensland
