= Isisford–Blackall Road =

Road in Queensland, Australia

Isisford–Blackall Road Queensland

General information
- Type: Rural road
- Length: 122 km (76 mi)

Major junctions
- West end: Isisford–Ilfracombe Road, Isisford
- Isisford–Emmet Road; Blackall–Emmet Road; Blackall–Adavale Road
- East end: Landsborough Highway, Blackall

Isisford–Blackall Road is a continuous 122-kilometre (76 mi) road route in the Longreach and Blackall-Tambo local government areas of Queensland, Australia. It is a state-controlled regional road (number 716), rated as a local road of regional significance (LRRS).

== Route description ==
The road commences as St Mary Street at an intersection with the Isisford–Ilfracombe Road (known as St Cyril Street) in Isisford, in the Longreach region. It runs south-east before becoming Isisford–Blackall Road as it leaves the town. It turns north-east and then south-east until it reaches an intersection with Isisford–Emmet Road, which continues south-east. The road turns north-east and continues generally east to the locality and regional boundary, where it enters the locality of Blackall, in the Blackall-Tambo region.

The road turns south-east and continues in that direction, passing the exit to Blackall–Emmet Road to the south-west, until it reaches the vicinity of the former Malvernton railway station on the now abandoned railway line. It then turns north-east to the town of Blackall, passing the exit to Blackall–Adavale Road to the south before it enters as Coronation Drive and ends at an intersection with the Landsborough Highway (known as Shamrock Street).

The road is two lanes wide and fully sealed. A project to rehabilitate 26 kilometres (16 mi) of pavement is expected to complete in mid-2023.

For travel to and from the Isisford district this road is part of the shortest route to centres along the Warrego Highway.

== History ==
The Isisford region was explored in 1846 by Major Thomas Mitchell and his party. Isis Downs Station was established in 1867, named for the Isis River in England. The town was established nearby and took its name from the station. The town began in 1875 and was surveyed and named in 1878.

The Blackall region was also explored in 1846 by Thomas Mitchell. In 1856, Augustus Gregory passed through the area noting that the landscape was a vast plain lacking vegetation, in contrast to Mitchell's description of good country. Blackall was named by Surveyor Abraham H. May after Sir Samuel Blackall, the second Governor of Queensland.

During the 1860s Blackall developed as a service centre for the surrounding pastoral properties. A survey of town allotments was conducted in 1868. The dominant industry in the area is grazing with over 70 homesteads reported to be in the district in 2020. A substantial number of these properties are adjacent to or accessed from Isisford–Blackall Road. One such property is Athol Station, which was sold in 2018 for $23 million.

== Other roads ==
The following state-controlled district roads, each rated as a local road of regional significance (LRRS), intersect with the Isisford–Blackall Road:

- Blackall–Adavale Road (number 7103)
- Isisford–Emmet Road (number 7165)
- Isisford–Ilfracombe Road (number 715)

=== Blackall–Adavale Road ===
Blackall–Adavale Road
- Location: Isisford–Blackall Road, Blackall to Quilpie–Adavale Road, Adavale
- Length: 211 km (131 mi)

This road starts at an intersection with the Isisford–Blackall Road in Blackall. It runs south-west for 211 kilometres (131 mi) to Adavale, where it becomes the Quilpie–Adavale Road.

=== Isisford–Emmet Road ===
Isisford–Emmet Road
- Location: Isisford–Blackall Road, Isisford to Emmet–Highlands Road, Emmet
- Length: 47.1 km (29.3 mi)

This road starts at an intersection with the Isisford–Blackall Road in Isisford. It runs south for 47.1 kilometres (29.3 mi) to Emmet, where it becomes the Emmet–Highlands Road.

=== Isisford–Ilfracombe Road ===
Isisford–Ilfracombe Road
- Location: Isisford–Blackall Road, Isisford to Landsborough Highway, Ilfracombe
- Length: 88.5 km (55.0 mi)

This road starts at an intersection with the Isisford–Blackall Road in Isisford. It runs north for 88.5 kilometres (55.0 mi) to Ilfracombe, where it ends at an intersection with the Landsborough Highway.

== Major intersections ==
All distances are from Google Maps.

LGA	Location	km	mi	Destinations	Notes
Longreach	Isisford	0	0.0	Isisford–Ilfracombe Road – north-east – Ilfracombe	Western end of Isisford–Blackall Road. Road continues south-east as St Mary Street.
Longreach	Isisford	3.4	2.1	Isisford–Emmet Road – south-east – Emmet	Road continues north-east.
Blackall-Tambo	Blackall	79.2	49.2	Blackall–Emmet Road – south-west – Emmet	Road continues south-east.
Blackall-Tambo	Blackall	110	68	Blackall-Adavale Road – south – Adavale	Road continues north-east.
Blackall-Tambo	Blackall	122	76	Landsborough Highway – north-west – Barcaldine – south-east – Tambo.	Eastern end of Isisford–Blackall Road.
1.000 mi = 1.609 km; 1.000 km = 0.621 mi

== See also ==
- List of numbered roads in Queensland
