= Nambour–Bli Bli Road =

Road in Queensland, Australia

Nambour–Bli Bli Road Bli Bli Road Queensland

General information
- Type: Road
- Length: 8.1 km (5.0 mi)

Major junctions
- West end: Nambour Connection Road and Nambour–Mapleton Road, Nambour
- Bruce Highway; Yandina–Bli Bli Road
- East end: David Low Way, Bli Bli

Nambour–Bli Bli Road is a continuous 8.1-kilometre (5.0 mi) road route in the Sunshine Coast local government area of Queensland, Australia. It is signed as State Route 10. It is a state-controlled district road (number 130), rated as a local road of regional significance (LRRS).

== Route description ==
The road starts at an intersection with Nambour–Mapleton Road (known as National Park Road) and Nambour Connection Road (see below) in Nambour. It runs east as Bli Bli Road (Tourist Drive 23), crossing into Bli Bli before reaching the Bruce Highway, which it passes under at a dumbbell intersection. It runs southeast as State Route 10, and then northeast before turning east. It reaches an intersection with Yandina–Bli Bli Road (Willis Road) to the north, then turns southeast to an intersection with David Low Way, where it ends.

The road is fully sealed to at least a two lane standard. It serves the rural and residential areas along its length.

Since July 1997, when Yandina was bypassed by the Bruce Highway, this road is part of the shortest route from Eumundi to Maroochydore.

== History ==
Logging began in the Nambour district in 1862. By 1870 a permanent European settlement, known as Petrie's Creek, had been established. In 1891, the North Coast railway to Brisbane was completed, and at its opening Petrie's Creek was renamed Nambour, after the "Nambah" cattle station, which was established in 1868.

In 1862 the Bli Bli area was part of the 1,600 acres (650 ha) Moolooloo Plains grazing lease. The beginnings of a town on part of that lease were in evidence by 1868, and the district was almost fully settled (with small farms) by the late 1880s.

== Major intersections ==
All distances are from Google Maps. The entire road is within the Sunshine Coast local government area.

Location	km	mi	Destinations	Notes
Nambour	0	0.0	Nambour Connection Road (Coronation Avenue) – southwest – Nambour; Nambour Connection Road – northeast – Yandina; Nambour–Mapleton Road – northwest – Mapleton	Western end of Nambour–Bli Bli Road. Road starts, as part of Tourist Route 23, as Bli Bli Road.
Bli Bli	0.95– 1.3	0.59– 0.81	Bruce Highway – southeast – Forest Glen – northwest – Yandina	Road continues southeast as State Route 10, then northeast.
Bli Bli	7.3	4.5	Yandina–Bli Bli Road (Willis Road) – north – Yandina	Road turns southeast.
Bli Bli	8.1	5.0	David Low Way – south – Diddillibah – east – Pacific Paradise	Eastern end of Nambour–Bli Bli Road
1.000 mi = 1.609 km; 1.000 km = 0.621 mi

== Nambour Connection Road ==
Nambour Connection Road
- Location: Bruce Highway, Woombye to Yandina South Connection Road, Kulangoor
- Length: 13.3 km (8.3 mi)

Nambour Connection Road is a state-controlled district road (number 489), part of which is rated as a local road of regional significance (LRRS). It runs from the Bruce Highway in Woombye, via Nambour, to Kulangoor, a distance of 13.3 kilometres (8.3 mi). It was part of the Bruce Highway from its inception in 1934 to 1990, when the Nambour Bypass was opened.

NOTE: Google maps show Nambour Connection Road extending north from Kulangoor to Yandina, but the official TMR map shows the northern part as Yandina South Connection Road. The reason for this is as follows: When the Nambour Bypass opened in 1990 the highway crossed from the new road to the old in Kulangoor, and the newly named Nambour Connection Road ended at that point. When the Yandina Bypass opened in 1997 the old road from Kulangoor to Yandina was renamed Yandina South Connection Road and the connection between the new and old roads was closed.

=== Major intersections (Nambour Connection Road) ===
All distances are from Google Maps. The entire road is within the Sunshine Coast local government area.

Location	km	mi	Destinations	Notes
Woombye	0	0.0	Bruce Highway – south – Tanawha – north – Yandina; Maroochydore Road – east – Forest Glen	Southern end of Nambour Connection Road.
Woombye	2.2	1.4	Woombye–Montville Road – southwest – Palmwoods, Montville; Kiel Mountain Road – northeast – Kiels Mountain	Road continues northwest, then north.
Nambour	9.2	5.7	Nambour–Bli Bli Road – east – Bli Bli; Nambour–Mapleton Road (National Park Road) – northwest– Mapleton	Road continues northeast, then north.
Kulangoor	13.3	8.3	Yandina South Connection Road – northwest – Yandina	Northern end of Nambour Connection Road. Road continues northwest as Yandina South Connection Road.
1.000 mi = 1.609 km; 1.000 km = 0.621 mi

== See also ==
- List of numbered roads in Queensland
