= Yandina–Bli Bli Road =

Road in Queensland, Australia

Yandina–Bli Bli Road Queensland

General information
- Type: Road
- Length: 13.1 km (8.1 mi)

Major junctions
- Northwest end: Yandina–Coolum Road and Yandina North Connection Road, Yandina
- Southeast end: Nambour–Bli Bli Road, Bli Bli

Yandina–Bli Bli Road is a continuous 13.1-kilometre (8.1 mi) road route in the Sunshine Coast local government area of Queensland, Australia. It is a state-controlled district road (number 1305), rated as a local road of regional significance (LRRS).

== Route description ==
The road starts at an intersection with Yandina–Coolum Road (known as Fleming Street) and Yandina North Connection Road (Farrell Street) in Yandina. It runs south as Nambour Connection Road to Ferry Street, where it turns east and northeast before turning southeast as Yandina–Bli Bli Road before crossing over the Bruce Highway with no intersection. It continues southeast before entering the locality of Maroochy River, where it runs east and south before exiting. It continues southeast through Bli Bli until it reaches a roundabout where it changes to Thomas Road. After continuing further southeast it turns south and enters Willis Road, which runs south until it meets Nambour–Bli Bli Road at a roundabout, where it ends.

The road is fully sealed to at least a two lane standard. It serves the rural and residential areas along its length.

Prior to July 1997, when Yandina was bypassed by the Bruce Highway, this road was part of the shortest route from Eumundi to Maroochydore.

== History ==
European settlement began in the Yandina district in the 1850s and the town was surveyed in 1870. Leases for three cattle runs were granted in 1853, and timber getting commenced in the late 1860s. The combined pastoral leases, "Canando" and "Yandina", comprised 100,000 acres (40,000 ha) extending from Yandina to Cooroy. In 1868 the "Yandina" run was made available for selection for closer settlement.

In 1862 the Bli Bli area was part of the 1,600 acres (650 ha) Moolooloo Plains grazing lease. The beginnings of a town on part of that lease were in evidence by 1868, and the district was almost fully settled (with small farms) by the late 1880s.

== Major intersections ==
All distances are from Google Maps. The entire road is within the Sunshine Coast local government area.

Location	km	mi	Destinations	Notes
Yandina	0	0.0	Yandina North Connection Road – north – Eumundi; Yandina–Coolum Road – east – Coolum Beach; Old Gympie Road – northwest – Cooloolabin	Northwestern end of Yandina–Bli Bli Road. Road starts as Nambour Connection Road.
Yandina	0.55	0.34	Nambour Connection Road – south – Kulangoor, Nambour	Road turns east as Wharf Street
Yandina	1.6	0.99	Vee Road – north – Yandina	Road turns southeast as Yandina–Bli Bli Road. It passes over the Bruce Highway with no intersection.
Bli Bli	11.5	7.1	Parklakes Drive – west – Bli Bli	Road continues southeast as Thomas Road
Bli Bli	12.6	7.8	Willis Road – northwest – Bli Bli	Road continues southeast as Willis Road
Bli Bli	13.1	8.1	Nambour–Bli Bli Road – west – Nambour – southeast – Bli Bli	Southeastern end of Yandina–Bli Bli Road
1.000 mi = 1.609 km; 1.000 km = 0.621 mi: Route transition

== See also ==
- List of numbered roads in Queensland
