= Warrego Highway state-controlled roads =

Warrego Highway state-controlled roads presents information about how the Warrego Highway is described for administrative and funding purposes by the Queensland Department of Transport and Main Roads, and about the state-controlled roads that intersect with it.

== Overview ==
The Warrego Highway runs from Ipswich to Charleville in Queensland, Australia. It is a state-controlled road, divided into seven sections for administrative and funding purposes. Six of the seven sections (numbers 18A to 18F) are part of the National Highway, while section 18G is a regional road. The sections are:

- 18A – Ipswich to Toowoomba
- 18B – Toowoomba to Dalby
- 18C – Dalby to Miles
- 18D – Miles to Roma
- 18E – Roma to Mitchell
- 18F – Mitchell to Morven
- 18G – Morven to Charleville

== Intersecting state-controlled roads (Section 18A) ==
The following state-controlled roads intersect with section 18A:

- Riverview–Moggill Ferry Road
- River Road (Queensland)
- Mount Crosby Road
- Ipswich–Warrego Highway Connection Road
- Brisbane Valley Highway
- Haigslea–Amberley Road
- Rosewood–Marburg Road
- Laidley–Plainland Road
- Forest Hill–Fernvale Road
- Gatton–Esk Road
- Gatton–Helidon Road
- Toowoomba Second Range Crossing
- Murphys Creek Road
- New England Highway

Details of above roads not described in another article are shown below.

=== Riverview–Moggill Ferry Road ===
Riverview–Moggill Ferry Road (Riverview Road)
- Location: Warrego Highway, Riverview to Moggill Sub–Arterial Road, Riverview
- Length: 2.0 km (1.2 mi)

Riverview–Moggill Ferry Road (Riverview Road) is a state-controlled district road (number 916). It runs from the Warrego Highway in Riverview to Moggill Ferry Road (Moggill Sub–Arterial Road) in Riverview, a distance of 2.0 kilometres (1.2 mi). It does not intersect with any state-controlled roads.

=== River Road (Queensland) ===
River Road (Queensland)
- Location: Warrego Highway, Riverview to Cunningham Highway, Dinmore
- Length: 1.5 km (0.93 mi)

River Road (Queensland) is a state-controlled district road (number 309). It runs from the Warrego Highway in Riverview to the Cunningham Highway in Dinmore, a distance of 1.5 kilometres (0.93 mi). It intersects with Ipswich–Cunningham Highway Connection Road (Brisbane Road) in Dinmore.

=== Mount Crosby Road ===
Mount Crosby Road
- Location: Ipswich–Warrego Highway Connection Road, North Ipswich to Moggill Sub–Arterial Road, Pinjarra Hills
- Length: 19.6 km (12.2 mi)
- Route number: 37

Mount Crosby Road is a state-controlled district road (number 3042), rated as a local road of regional significance (LRRS). It runs from the Ipswich–Warrego Highway Connection Road (Downs Street) in North Ipswich to the Moggill Sub–Arterial Road (Moggill Road) in Pinjarra Hills, a distance of 19.6 kilometres (12.2 mi). This road carries the State Route 37 shield. It intersects with the Warrego Highway on the North Tivoli / Chuwar boundary.

=== Ipswich–Warrego Highway Connection Road ===
Ipswich–Warrego Highway Connection Road
- Location: Ipswich–Cunningham Highway Connection Road, Ipswich to Warrego Highway, Brassall
- Length: 7.4 km (4.6 mi)
- Route number: 38

Ipswich–Warrego Highway Connection Road is a state-controlled district road (number 302), rated as a local road of regional significance (LRRS). It runs from the Ipswich–Cunningham Highway Connection Road (Brisbane Street / Limestone Street) in Ipswich to the Warrego Highway in Brassall, a distance of 7.4 kilometres (4.6 mi). This road carries the State Route 38 shield. It intersects with Mount Crosby Road in North Ipswich.

=== Haigslea–Amberley Road ===
Haigslea–Amberley Road
- Location: Warrego Highway, Haigslea to Ipswich–Rosewood Road, Amberley
- Length: 9.5 km (5.9 mi)

Haigslea–Amberley Road is a state-controlled district road (number 3041), rated as a local road of regional significance (LRRS). It runs from the Warrego Highway on the Haigslea / Ironbark / Walloon tripoint to the Ipswich–Rosewood Road in Amberley, a distance of 9.5 kilometres (5.9 mi). It intersects with Karrabin–Rosewood Road in Walloon.

=== Rosewood–Marburg Road ===
Rosewood–Marburg Road
- Location: Warrego Highway, Marburg to Ipswich–Rosewood Road, Rosewood
- Length: 10.5 km (6.5 mi)

Rosewood–Marburg Road is a state-controlled district road (number 303), rated as a local road of regional significance (LRRS). It runs from the Ipswich–Rosewood Road in Rosewood to the Warrego Highway in Marburg, a distance of 10.5 kilometres (6.5 mi). It intersects with Rosewood–Laidley Road and Karrabin–Rosewood Road in Rosewood.

=== Laidley–Plainland Road ===
Laidley–Plainland Road
- Location: Rosewood–Laidley Road, Laidley to Warrego Highway, Plainland
- Length: 8.6 km (5.3 mi)

Laidley–Plainland Road is a state-controlled district road (number 311), part of which is rated as a local road of regional significance (LRRS). It runs from the Rosewood–Laidley Road in Laidley to the Warrego Highway in Plainland, a distance of 8.6 kilometres (5.3 mi). It intersects with Gatton–Laidley Road in Laidley.

=== Murphys Creek Road ===
Murphys Creek Road
- Location: New England Highway, Blue Mountain Heights to Toowoomba Connection Road, Postmans Ridge
- Length: 24.6 km (15.3 mi)

Murphys Creek Road is a state-controlled district road (number 4104), rated as a local road of regional significance (LRRS). It runs from the New England Highway in Blue Mountain Heights to the former Warrego Highway (Toowoomba Connection Road) – (see below) in Postmans Ridge, a distance of 24.6 kilometres (15.3 mi). It does not intersect with any state-controlled roads.

A project to replace the Rocky Creek Bridge, built in 1928, was completed in October 2022 at a cost of $11 million.

== Status of Toowoomba roads ==
Officially, section 18A follows what is now known as Toowoomba Connection Road to its intersection with the New England Highway in Toowoomba, where section 18B commences. The Toowoomba Second Range Crossing is now part of the National Highway, and is gazetted as road 319. It is planned to gazette the Toowoomba Connection Road as number 315.

== Intersecting state-controlled roads (Section 18B) ==
The following state-controlled roads intersect with section 18B:

- Gore Highway
- Toowoomba–Cecil Plains Road
- Charlton Connection Road
- Oakey Connection Road
- Oakey–Pittsworth Road
- Bowenville–Norwin Road
- Dalby–Cecil Plains Road
- Bunya Highway

Details of above roads not described in another article are shown below.

=== Charlton Connection Road ===
Charlton Connection Road
- Location: Warrego Highway, Charlton to Toowoomba–Cecil Plains Road, Charlton
- Length: 1.5 km (0.93 mi)

Charlton Connection Road (Troys Road) is a state-controlled district road (number 320). It runs from the former Warrego Highway (Toowoomba Connection Road) in Charlton to Toowoomba–Cecil Plains Road in Charlton, a distance of 1.5 kilometres (0.93 mi). It does not intersect with any state-controlled roads.

== Intersecting state-controlled roads (Section 18C) ==
The following state-controlled roads intersect with section 18C:

- Moonie Highway
- Dalby–Jandowae Road
- Dalby–Kogan Road
- Macalister–Bell Road
- Warra–Canaga Creek Road
- Warra–Kogan Road
- Chinchilla–Tara Road
- Chinchilla–Wondai Road
- Auburn Road (Queensland)
- Leichhardt Highway

Details of above roads not described in another article are shown below.

=== Warra–Canaga Creek Road ===
Warra–Canaga Creek Road
- Location: Warrego Highway, Warra to Chinchilla–Wondai Road, Canaga
- Length: 30.9 km (19.2 mi)

Warra–Canaga Creek Road is a state-controlled district road (number 4201), rated as a local road of regional significance (LRRS). It runs from the Warrego Highway in Warra to Chinchilla–Wondai Road on the Canaga / Langlands midpoint, a distance of 30.9 kilometres (19.2 mi). It does not intersect with any state-controlled roads.

=== Auburn Road (Queensland) ===
Auburn Road (Queensland)
- Location: Warrego Highway, Chinchilla to Auburn Road, Auburn
- Length: 104 km (65 mi)

Auburn Road (Queensland) is a state-controlled district road (number 4261), rated as a local road of regional significance (LRRS). It runs from the Warrego Highway in Chinchilla to Auburn Road in Auburn, a distance of 104 kilometres (65 mi). It does not intersect with any state-controlled roads. Auburn Road continues north as a local road to Sujeewong, where it transitions to Redbank Road. This continues north to an intersection with Eidsvold–Theodore Road in Eidsvold West.

== Intersecting state-controlled roads (Section 18D) ==
The following state-controlled roads intersect with section 18D:

- Jackson–Wandoan Road
- Wallumbilla South Road
- Carnarvon Highway

Details of above roads not described in another article are shown below.

=== Jackson–Wandoan Road ===
Jackson–Wandoan Road
- Location: Warrego Highway, Jackson to Leichhardt Highway, Wandoan
- Length: 81.2 km (50.5 mi)

Jackson–Wandoan Road is a state-controlled district road (number 4302), rated as a local road of regional significance (LRRS). It runs from the Warrego Highway in Jackson to the Leichhardt Highway in Wandoan, a distance of 81.2 kilometres (50.5 mi). It does not intersect with any state-controlled roads.

== Intersecting state-controlled roads (Section 18E) ==
The following state-controlled roads intersect with section 18E:

- Mitchell–Forestvale Road
- Mitchell–St George Road

Details of the above roads are shown below.

=== Mitchell–Forestvale Road ===
Mitchell–Forestvale Road
- Location: Warrego Highway, Mitchell to Mount Moffatt Road, Forestvale
- Length: 67.8 km (42.1 mi)

Mitchell–Forestvale Road is a state-controlled district road (number 4403), rated as a local road of regional significance (LRRS). It runs from the Warrego Highway in Mitchell to Mount Moffatt Road in Forestvale, a distance of 67.8 kilometres (42.1 mi). It does not intersect with any state-controlled roads.

=== Mitchell–St George Road ===
Mitchell–St George Road
- Location: Warrego Highway, Mitchell to Balonne Highway, St George
- Length: 203 km (126 mi)

Mitchell–St George Road is a state-controlled district road (number 355), rated as a local road of regional significance (LRRS). It runs from the Warrego Highway in Mitchell to the Balonne Highway in St George, a distance of 203 kilometres (126 mi). It does not intersect with any state-controlled roads.

== Intersecting state-controlled roads (Sections 18F and 18G) ==
Section 18F ends at an intersection with the Landsborough Highway in Morven, and section 18G ends at an intersection with the Mitchell Highway in Charleville.

== Associated state-controlled roads ==
The following state-controlled roads, not described in another article, are associated with the intersecting roads described above, or their terminating roads:

- Karrabin–Rosewood Road
- Rosewood–Laidley Road
- Mulgowie Road
- Gatton–Laidley Road

=== Karrabin–Rosewood Road ===
Karrabin–Rosewood Road
- Location: Toongarra Road, Wulkuraka to Rosewood–Laidley Road, Rosewood
- Length: 14.7 km (9.1 mi)

Karrabin–Rosewood Road is a state-controlled district road (number 3002), rated as a local road of regional significance (LRRS). It runs from Toongarra Road in Wulkuraka to Rosewood–Laidley Road in Rosewood, a distance of 14.7 kilometres (9.1 mi). It intersects with Haigslea-Amberley Road in Walloon, and with Rosewood–Marburg Road and Ipswich–Rosewood Road in Rosewood.

=== Rosewood–Laidley Road ===
Rosewood–Laidley Road
- Location: Karrabin–Rosewood Road, Rosewood to Laidley–Plainland Road, Laidley
- Length: 23.6 km (14.7 mi)

Rosewood–Laidley Road is a state-controlled district road (number 308), part of which is rated as a local road of regional significance (LRRS). It runs from Karrabin–Rosewood Road in Rosewood to Laidley–Plainland Road in Laidley, a distance of 23.6 kilometres (14.7 mi). It intersects with Rosewood–Marburg Road and Ipswich–Rosewood Road in Rosewood, and with Mulgowie Road and Gatton–Laidley Road in Laidley.

=== Mulgowie Road ===
Mulgowie Road
- Location: Rosewood–Laidley Road, Laidley to Mulgowie Road, Townson
- Length: 28.0 km (17.4 mi)

Mulgowie Road is a state-controlled district road (number 3083), part of which is rated as a local road of regional significance (LRRS). It runs from Rosewood–Laidley Road in Laidley to Mulgowie Road in Townson, a distance of 28.0 kilometres (17.4 mi). It does not intersect with any state-controlled roads.

=== Gatton–Laidley Road ===
Gatton–Laidley Road
- Location: Gatton–Helidon Road, Gatton to Rosewood–Laidley Road, Laidley
- Length: 15.1 km (9.4 mi)

Gatton–Laidley Road is a state-controlled district road (number 312), part of which is rated as a local road of regional significance (LRRS). It runs from Gatton–Helidon Road in Gatton to Rosewood–Laidley Road in Laidley, a distance of 15.1 kilometres (9.4 mi). It intersects with Forest Hill–Fernvale Road in Forest Hill and Laidley–Plainland Road in Laidley.

== See also ==
- List of numbered roads in Queensland
