= Tamborine Mountain road network =

Road network in Queensland, Australia

The Tamborine Mountain road network is a group of roads that provide access to the mountain community from various lowland localities. The network ensures continuity of access in times of flooding or other natural disasters, and during planned maintenance activities. The locality of Tamborine Mountain includes a plateau that hosts a substantial residential community plus many tourism accommodation and activity venues.

Located to the south-west of Brisbane and north-west of the Gold Coast, in Queensland, Australia, Tamborine Mountain is also a popular day-trip destination. Most traffic from Brisbane travels through Tamborine village, in the locality of Tamborine to the north-west of the mountain, while most Gold Coast traffic travels through Mount Nathan (to the south-east) or Wongawallan (to the north-east).

== Roads in the network ==
The following roads are considered to be part of the network:

- Beaudesert–Beenleigh Road
- Beaudesert–Nerang Road
- Tamborine Mountain Road
- Tamborine–Nerang Road
- Tamborine–Oxenford Road
- Waterford–Tamborine Road

== Beaudesert–Beenleigh Road ==
Beaudesert–Beenleigh Road
- Location: Beaudesert–Nerang Road, Tabragalba to Beenleigh Connection Road, Beenleigh
- Length: 35.5 km (22.1 mi)
- Route number: 92

Beaudesert–Beenleigh Road passes through Tamborine village, bringing traffic from the Mount Lindesay Highway to the south-west and from the Pacific Motorway to the north-east. Some of the traffic on this road then travels on Tamborine Mountain Road to reach Tamborine Mountain.

== Beaudesert–Nerang Road ==
Beaudesert–Nerang Road
- Location: Mount Lindesay Highway, Beaudesert to Southport–Nerang Road, Nerang
- Length: 58.9 km (36.6 mi)
- Route number: 90

Beaudesert–Nerang Road passes through Canungra to the south and Clagiraba to the south-east, providing access to roads from those localities to Tamborine Mountain.

== Tamborine Mountain Road ==
Tamborine Mountain Road
- Location: Beaudesert–Beenleign Road, Tamborine to Beaudesert–Nerang Road, Canungra
- Length: 24.1 km (15.0 mi)
- Route number: 95

Tamborine Mountain Road runs from Tamborine village in the north-west to Tamborine Mountain and continues south to Canungra. It carries most of the traffic from Brisbane to Tamborine Mountain.

== Tamborine–Nerang Road ==
Tamborine–Nerang Road
- Location: Tamborine Mountain Road to Beaudesert–Nerang Road, Clagiraba
- Length: 10.9 km (6.8 mi)

Tamborine–Nerang Road is a state-controlled district road (number 2050) rated as a local road of regional significance (LRRS). It runs from Tamborine Mountain Road in Tamborine Mountain to Beaudesert–Nerang Road in Clagiraba, a distance of 10.9 kilometres (6.8 mi) by a circuitous route to the east. It is known in parts by each of the following local names:

- Wilson Road
- Prospect Street
- Siganto Street
- Golf Course Road
- Guanaba Road
- Henri Robert Drive

=== Petition for improvements ===
In October 2021 a petition requesting improvements to Tamborine Mountain roads was presented to the Queensland Parliament. Particular mention was made of the poor condition of Golf Course Road, Guanaba Road and Henri Robert Drive, all components of this road. Also mentioned was Main Western Road, the component of Tamborine Mountain Road used to access this road.

== Tamborine–Oxenford Road ==
Tamborine–Oxenford Road
- Location: Tamborine Mountain Road to Pacific Motorway, Oxenford
- Length: 22.2 km (13.8 mi)
- Route number: 95

Tamborine–Oxenford Road is a state-controlled district road (number 206) rated as a local road of regional significance (LRRS). It runs from Tamborine Mountain Road in Tamborine Mountain to the Pacific Motorway in Oxenford, a distance of 22.2 kilometres (13.8 mi) by a circuitous route to the north-east. It is known in parts by each of the following local names:

- Eagle Heights Road
- Long Road
- Macdonnell Road

=== Upgrade project ===
A project to upgrade the Howard Creek Causeway, at a cost of $10 million, entered the construction phase in October 2021.

== Waterford–Tamborine Road ==
Waterford–Tamborine Road
- Location: Waterford to Tamborine village
- Length: 25.0 km (15.5 mi)
- Route number: 95

Waterford–Tamborine Road is a state-controlled district road (number 207) rated as a local road of regional significance (LRRS). It runs from Brisbane–Beenleigh Road (Note: Brisbane-Beenleigh Road is a state-controlled district road (number 204) rated as a local road of regional significance (LRRS). It is known locally as Kingston Road, Albert Street and Logan River Road.) (Albert Street) in Waterford to Tamborine village, a distance of 25.0 kilometres (15.5 mi) by a fairly direct route to the south. Much of the traffic from this road then travels on Tamborine Mountain Road to reach Tamborine Mountain. The road is known for a short distance in Waterford as Nerang Street.

=== Upgrade projects ===
Five upgrade projects are in planning, progress or recently completed for this road. They are:

- * Lane duplication from North Street to Anzac Avenue was completed in late 2021.
- * Construction of improvements to the intersection with Brisbane-Beenleigh Road was started in May 2022.
- * Construction and installation of traffic signals at the intersection with Easterly Street was expected to start in September 2022.
- * Investigation of a possible upgrade between Stegemann Road and Dairy Creek Road has been carried out, and design is expected to proceed, but there is no funding for construction.
- * Planning for possible future upgrades along the road is continuing.

== See also ==
- List of road routes in Queensland
- List of numbered roads in Queensland
