= Gladstone road network =

Group of roads that provide access to Gladstone, Queensland

Gladstone road network is a group of roads that provide access to the urban areas of Gladstone in Queensland, Australia, and enable travel between the communities. Most of the roads retain their original road or street names, and are not well known by their official names.

== Roads in the network ==
In addition to the Bruce Highway and the Dawson Highway, the network consists of the following state-controlled roads:

- Gladstone–Benaraby Road
- Boyne Island Road
- Gladstone Port Access Road
- Gladstone–Mount Larcom Road

=== Boyne Island Road ===
Boyne Island Road
- Location: Gladstone–Benaraby Road, Boyne Island to Tannum Sands Road, Tannum Sands
- Length: 8.4 km (5.2 mi)

Boyne Island Road is a state-controlled district road (number 1806), rated as a local road of regional significance (LRRS). It runs from Gladstone–Benaraby Road in Boyne Island to Tannum Sands Road in Tannum Sands, a distance of 8.4 kilometres (5.2 mi). It does not intersect with any state-controlled road.

=== Gladstone Port Access Road ===
Gladstone Port AccessRoad
- Location: Gladstone–Mount Larcom Road, Gladstone Central to Hopper Road, Barney Point
- Length: 0.85 km (0.53 mi; 2,800 ft)

Gladstone Port Access Road is a state-controlled regional road (number 183). It runs from Gladstone–Benaraby Road in Gladstone Central to Hopper Road in Barney Point, a distance of 0.85 kilometres (0.53 mi). It does not intersect with any state-controlled road.
