= Cunningham Highway state-controlled roads =

Cunningham Highway state-controlled roads presents information about how the Cunningham Highway is described for administrative and funding purposes by the Queensland Department of Transport and Main Roads, and about the state-controlled roads that intersect with it.

== Overview ==
The Cunningham Highway runs from Goodna to Goondiwindi in Queensland, Australia. It is a state-controlled road, subdivided into four sections for administrative and funding purposes. Sections 17A, 17B, and part of 17D are part of the National Highway, while section 17C and part of section 17D are strategic roads. The sections are:

- 17A – Goodna to Ipswich
- 17B – Ipswich to Warwick
- 17C – Warwick to Inglewood
- 17D – Inglewood to Goondiwindi

== Intersecting state-controlled roads (Section 17A) ==
The following state-controlled road intersects with section 17A:

- Warrego Highway

== Intersecting state-controlled roads (Section 17B) ==
The following state-controlled roads intersect with section 17B:

- Ipswich–Cunningham Highway Connection Road
- River Road (Queensland)
- Swanbank Road
- Centenary Motorway
- Ipswich–Boonah Road
- Ipswich–Rosewood Road
- Rosewood–Warrill View Road
- Warrill View–Peak Crossing Road
- Kalbar Connection Road
- Boonah–Fassifern Road
- Lake Moogerah Road
- New England Highway
- Freestone Road
- Warwick–Yangan Road
- Warwick–Allora Road
- Warwick–Killarney Road

Details of above roads not described in another article are shown below.

=== Ipswich–Cunningham Highway Connection Road ===
Ipswich–Cunningham Highway Connection Road
- Location: Cunningham Highway, Dinmore to Cunningham Highway, Yamanto
- Length: 14.5 km (9.0 mi)

Ipswich–Cunningham Highway Connection Road (Brisbane Road / Warwick Road) is a state-controlled regional road (number 301). It runs from the Cunningham Highway in Dinmore, via Ipswich, to the Cunningham Highway in Yamanto, a distance of 14.5 kilometres (9.0 mi). It intersects with River Road (Queensland) in Dinmore and Ipswich–Warrego Highway Connection Road in Ipswich.

=== Swanbank Road ===
Swanbank Road
- Location: South Station Road, Raceview to Abrahams Road, Swanbank
- Length: 4.5 km (2.8 mi)

Swanbank Road is a state-controlled district road (number 2106), part of which is rated as a local road of regional significance (LRRS). It runs from South Station Road in Raceview to Abrahams Road in Swanbank, a distance of 4.5 kilometres (2.8 mi). It intersects with the Cunningham Highway in Raceview.

=== Ipswich–Rosewood Road ===
Ipswich–Rosewood Road
- Location: Cunningham Highway, Willowbank to Rosewood–Marburg Road, Rosewood
- Length: 12.8 km (8.0 mi)

Ipswich–Rosewood Road is a state-controlled district road (number 304), rated as a local road of regional significance (LRRS). It runs from the Cunningham Highway in Willowbank to Rosewood–Marburg Road in Rosewood, a distance of 12.8 kilometres (8.0 mi). It intersects with Haigslea–Amberley Road in Amberley and with Rosewood–Warrill View Road, Karrabin–Rosewood Road and Rosewood–Laidley Road in Rosewood.

=== Rosewood–Warrill View Road ===
Rosewood–Warrill View Road
- Location: Ipswich–Rosewood Road, Rosewood to Cunningham Highway, Warrill View
- Length: 32.4 km (20.1 mi)

Rosewood–Warrill View Road is a state-controlled district road (number 305), rated as a local road of regional significance (LRRS). It runs from Ipswich–Rosewood Road in Rosewood to the Cunningham Highway in Warrill View, a distance of 32.4 kilometres (20.1 mi). It does not intersect with any state-controlled roads.

=== Warrill View–Peak Crossing Road ===
Warrill View–Peak Crossing Road
- Location: Cunningham Highway, Warrill View to Ipswich–Boonah Road, Peak Crossing
- Length: 14.1 km (8.8 mi)

Warrill View–Peak Crossing Road is a state-controlled district road (number 216), rated as a local road of regional significance (LRRS). It runs from the Cunningham Highway in Warrill View to Ipswich–Boonah Road in Peak Crossing, a distance of 14.1 kilometres (8.8 mi). It does not intersect with any state-controlled roads.

=== Kalbar Connection Road ===
Kalbar Connection Road
- Location: Cunningham Highway, Kalbar to Boonah–Fassifern Road, Fassifern Valley
- Length: 6.6 km (4.1 mi)

Kalbar Connection Road is a state-controlled district road (number 2102), rated as a local road of regional significance (LRRS). It runs from the Cunningham Highway in Kalbar to Boonah–Fassifern Road in Fassifern Valley, a distance of 6.6 kilometres (4.1 mi). It does not intersect with any state-controlled roads.

=== Lake Moogerah Road ===
Lake Moogerah Road
- Location: Cunningham Highway, Mount Edwards to Boonah–Fassifern Road, Fassifern Valley, via Moogerah
- Length: 29.5 km (18.3 mi)

Lake Moogerah Road is a state-controlled district road (number 2141), rated as a local road of regional significance (LRRS). It runs from the Cunningham Highway in Mount Edwards, via Moogerah, to Boonah–Fassifern Road in Fassifern Valley, a distance of 29.5 kilometres (18.3 mi). It intersects with Mount Alford Road and Moogerah Connection Road in Moogerah.

=== Freestone Road ===
Freestone Road
- Location: Cunningham Highway, Warwick to Freestone Creek Road, Freestone
- Length: 11.4 km (7.1 mi)

Freestone Road is a state-controlled district road (number 2201), rated as a local road of regional significance (LRRS). It runs from the Cunningham Highway in Warwick to Freestone Creek Road in Freestone, a distance of 11.4 kilometres (7.1 mi). It does not intersect with any state-controlled roads.

=== Warwick–Yangan Road ===
Warwick–Yangan Road
- Location: Cunningham Highway, Warwick to Yangan–Killarney Road, Yangan
- Length: 17.9 km (11.1 mi)

Warwick–Yangan Road is a state-controlled district road (number 222), rated as a local road of regional significance (LRRS). It runs from the Cunningham Highway in Warwick to Yangan–Killarney Road in Yangan, a distance of 17.9 kilometres (11.1 mi). It does not intersect with any state-controlled roads.

=== Warwick–Allora Road ===
Warwick–Allora Road
- Location: Cunningham Highway, Warwick to Dalrymple Creek Road, Allora
- Length: 25.1 km (15.6 mi)

Warwick–Allora Road is a state-controlled district road (number 3303), rated as a local road of regional significance (LRRS). It runs from the Cunningham Highway in Warwick to Dalrymple Creek Road in Allora, a distance of 25.1 kilometres (15.6 mi). It does not intersect with any state-controlled roads.

=== Warwick–Killarney Road ===
Warwick–Killarney Road
- Location: Cunningham Highway, Warwick to the New South Wales border, Killarney
- Length: 38.3 km (23.8 mi)

Warwick–Killarney Road is a state-controlled regional road (number 221). It runs from the Cunningham Highway in Warwick to the New South Wales border in Killarney, a distance of 38.3 kilometres (23.8 mi). It intersects with Bracker Road in Warwick, and with Yangan–Killarney Road and Spring Creek Road in Killarney.

== Intersecting state-controlled roads (Section 17C) ==
The following state-controlled roads intersect with section 17C:

- Leslie Dam Road
- Leyburn–Cunningham Road
- Toowoomba–Karara Road
- Stanthorpe–Inglewood Road
- Millmerran–Inglewood Road
- Inglewood–Texas Road

Details of above roads not described in another article are shown below.

=== Leslie Dam Road ===
Leslie Dam Road
- Location: Cunningham Highway, Allan to the Leslie Dam campground, Leslie Dam
- Length: 5.9 km (3.7 mi)

Leslie Dam Road is a state-controlled district road (number 2302), rated as a local road of regional significance (LRRS). It runs from the Cunningham Highway in Allan to the Leslie Dam campground in Leslie Dam, a distance of 5.9 kilometres (3.7 mi). It does not intersect with any state-controlled roads.

== Intersecting state-controlled roads (Section 17D) ==
The following state-controlled roads intersect with section 17D:

- Texas–Yelarbon Road
- Yelarbon–Keetah Road
- Wyaga Road
- Leichhardt Highway
- Goondiwindi Connection Road

Details of above roads not described in another article are shown below.

=== Yelarbon–Keetah Road ===
Yelarbon–Keetah Road
- Location: Cunningham Highway, Yelarbon to the New South Wales border, Yelarbon
- Length: 9.2 km (5.7 mi)

Yelarbon–Keetah Road is a state-controlled district road (number 241), rated as a local road of regional significance (LRRS). It runs from the Cunningham Highway in Yelarbon to the New South Wales border (Dumaresq River) in Yelarbon, a distance of 9.2 kilometres (5.7 mi). It does not intersect with any state-controlled roads.

=== Wyaga Road ===
Wyaga Road
- Location: Cunningham Highway, Wondalli to the Gore Highway, Wyaga
- Length: 39.5 km (24.5 mi)

Wyaga Road is a state-controlled district road (number 3207), rated as a local road of regional significance (LRRS). It runs from the Cunningham Highway in Wondalli to the Gore Highway in Wyaga, a distance of 39.5 kilometres (24.5 mi). It does not intersect with any state-controlled roads.

=== Goondiwindi Connection Road ===
Goondiwindi Connection Road
- Location: Cunningham Highway, Goondiwindi to Goondiwindi West Connection Road, Goondiwindi
- Length: 1.6 km (0.99 mi)

Goondiwindi Connection Road is a state-controlled district road (number 360), rated as a local road of regional significance (LRRS). It runs from the Cunningham Highway in Goondiwindi to Goondiwindi West Connection Road in Goondiwindi, a distance of 1.6 kilometres (0.99 mi). It does not intersect with any state-controlled roads.

== Associated state-controlled roads ==
The following state-controlled roads, not described in another article, are associated with the intersecting roads described above, or their terminating roads:

- Mount Alford Road
- Moogerah Connection Road
- Yangan–Killarney Road
- Spring Creek Road
- Goondiwindi West Connection Road

=== Mount Alford Road ===
Mount Alford Road
- Location: Lake Moogerah Road, Moogerah to Boonah–Rathdowney Road, Coochin
- Length: 6.9 km (4.3 mi)

Mount Alford Road is a state-controlled district road (number 2134), rated as a local road of regional significance (LRRS). It runs from Lake Moogerah Road in Moogerah to Boonah–Rathdowney Road in Coochin, a distance of 6.9 kilometres (4.3 mi). It does not intersect with any state-controlled roads.

=== Moogerah Connection Road ===
Moogerah Connection Road
- Location: Lake Moogerah Road, Moogerah to Lake Moogerah picnic area
- Length: 1.3 km (0.81 mi)

Moogerah Connection Road is a state-controlled district road (number 2142), rated as a local road of regional significance (LRRS). It runs from Lake Moogerah Road in Moogerah to Lake Moogerah picnic area in Moogerah, a distance of 1.3 kilometres (0.81 mi). It does not intersect with any state-controlled roads.

=== Yangan–Killarney Road ===
Yangan–Killarney Road
- Location: Warwick–Yangan Road, Yangan to Warwick–Killarney Road, Killarney
- Length: 19.5 km (12.1 mi)

Yangan–Killarney Road is a state-controlled district road (number 2223), rated as a local road of regional significance (LRRS). It runs from Warwick–Yangan Road in Yangan to Warwick–Killarney Road in Killarney, a distance of 19.5 kilometres (12.1 mi). It does not intersect with any state-controlled roads.

=== Spring Creek Road ===
Spring Creek Road
- Location: Warwick–Killarney Road, Killarney to Spring Creek Road, The Head
- Length: 19.4 km (12.1 mi)

Spring Creek Road is a state-controlled district road (number 2214), rated as a local road of regional significance (LRRS). It runs from Warwick–Killarney Road in Killarney to Spring Creek Road in The Head, a distance of 19.4 kilometres (12.1 mi). It does not intersect with any state-controlled roads.

=== Goondiwindi West Connection Road ===
Goondiwindi West Connection Road
- Location: Goondiwindi Connection Road, Goondiwindi to Barwon Highway, Goondiwindi
- Length: 3.1 km (1.9 mi)

Goondiwindi West Connection Road is a state-controlled district road (number 362), rated as a local road of regional significance (LRRS). It runs from Goondiwindi Connection Road in Goondiwindi to the Barwon Highway in Goondiwindi, a distance of 3.1 kilometres (1.9 mi). It does not intersect with any state-controlled roads.

== See also ==
- List of numbered roads in Queensland
