= Cairns road network =

Group of roads that provide access to Cairns, Queensland

Cairns road network is a group of roads that provide access to the urban areas of Cairns in Queensland, Australia, and enable travel between the communities. Most of the roads retain their original road or street names, and are not well known by their official names.

== Status of Bruce Highway in Cairns ==
Mulgrave Road, officially road number 809, is shown on Google maps as Bruce Highway (route A1). The road that is officially part of section 10P of the Bruce Highway (Ray Jones Drive) has no shield shown on Google maps. The roads described below are in accordance with the official TMR documentation, rather than Google maps.

== Roads in the network ==
In addition to the Bruce Highway, the Captain Cook Highway, Cairns Western Arterial Road, and the Kennedy Highway, the network consists of the following state-controlled roads:

- Mulgrave Road
- Port Connection Road
- Anderson Street
- Stratford Connection Road
- Smithfield Bypass

A number of local roads that also link the localities are not included in this article.

=== Mulgrave Road ===
Mulgrave Road
- Location: Bruce Highway, Woree to Captain Cook Highway, Cairns City
- Length: 6.4 km (4.0 mi)

Mulgrave Road is a state-controlled regional road (number 809). It runs from the Bruce Highway in Woree to the Captain Cook Highway in Cairns City, a distance of 6.4 kilometres (4.0 mi), carrying the A1 shield. It intersects with Cairns Western Arterial Road in Bungalow and with Port Connection Road in Parramatta Park.

=== Port Connection Road ===
Port Connection Road
- Location: Mulgrave Road, Parramatta Park to Bruce Highway, Portsmith
- Length: 1.8 km (1.1 mi)

Port Connection Road (Bunda Street) is a state-controlled regional road (number 810). It runs from Mulgrave Road in Parramatta Park to the Bruce Highway in Portsmith, a distance of 1.8 kilometres (1.1 mi). It does not intersect with any state-controlled roads.

=== Anderson Street (Queensland) ===
Anderson Street (Queensland)
- Location: Cairns Western Arterial Road, Manoora to Captain Cook Highway, Cairns North
- Length: 2.5 km (1.6 mi)

Anderson Street (Queensland) is a state-controlled district road (number 649). It runs from Cairns Western Arterial Road in Manoora to the Captain Cook Highway in Cairns North, a distance of 2.5 kilometres (1.6 mi). It does not intersect with any state-controlled roads.

=== Stratford Connection Road ===
Stratford Connection Road
- Location: Captain Cook Highway, Aeroglen to Cairns Western Arterial Road, Redlynch
- Length: 7.2 km (4.5 mi)

Stratford Connection Road (Kamerunga Road) is a state-controlled district road (number 6472). It runs from the Captain Cook Highway in Aeroglen to Cairns Western Arterial Road in Redlynch, a distance of 72 kilometres (45 mi). It does not intersect with any state-controlled roads.

=== Smithfield Bypass ===
Smithfield Bypass
- Location: Captain Cook Highway, Smithfield to Captain Cook Highway (further north in Smithfield)
- Length: 3.3 km (2.1 mi)

Smithfield Bypass is a state-controlled road (number 651). It runs from the Captain Cook Highway in Smithfield to Captain Cook Highway further north in Smithfield, a distance of 3.3 kilometres (2.1 mi). It does not intersect with any state-controlled roads.
