= Maroochydore Road =

Road in Queensland, Australia

Maroochydore Road Queensland

General information
- Type: Road
- Length: 9.8 km (6.1 mi)
- Route number(s): State Route 8

Major junctions
- West end: Bruce Highway (M1), Forest Glen
- Main Road/ Jones Road; Sunshine Motorway State Route 70 Broadmeadows Road/ Evans Street
- East end: Beach Road / Horton Parade (State Route 6), Maroochydore

Location(s)
- Major suburbs: Kuluin

Maroochydore Road (State Route 8) is a major arterial road on the Sunshine Coast, Queensland that connects the major town/urban centre of Maroochydore with the Bruce Highway.

== Route description ==
Maroochydore Road is a 9.8 km, 4 lane state controlled road on the Sunshine Coast that connects Maroochydore with the Bruce Highway, the region's main connection to Brisbane, Queensland's state capital. Maroochydore Road begins at the intersection of Beach Road and Horton Parade (state route 6) in the Maroochydore CBD and travels west providing an interchange with the Sunshine Motorway (state route 70) and through the town of Kuluin. Maroochydore Road terminates at the intersection with the Bruce Highway in Forest Glen but the road itself continues as Nambour Connection Road, a state controlled road that leads to Nambour.

== Upgrades ==
=== Improve intersection ===
A project to improve the intersection at the eastern end of the road, at a cost of $1.861 million, was to be completed by early 2022.

=== Kunda Park intersection improvements ===
A project to improve an intersection at Kunda Park was in the planning stage in November 2021.

== Major intersections ==
The entire road is in the Sunshine Coast local government area.

| Location | km | mi | Destinations | Notes |
|---|---|---|---|---|
| Forest Glen | 0 | 0.0 | Bruce Highway (State Route M1) – north – Nambour south – Chevallum | Western end of Maroochydore Road (state route 8), road continues as Nambour Connection Road, a state controlled road that connects to Nambour |
| Kuluin | 5.4 | 3.4 | Main Road – north – Maroochydore; Jones Road – south – Buderim | |
| Maroochydore | 7.0 | 4.3 | Sunshine Motorway (State Route 70) – north – Pacific Paradise/ south – Alexandra Headland | |
| Maroochydore | 9.1 | 5.7 | Broadmeadows Road – north – Maroochydore; Evans Street – south – Maroochydore | |
| Maroochydore | 9.8 | 6.1 | Beach Road (State Route 6) – north – Maroochydore / Horton Parade (State Route 6) – south – Maroochydore; Ocean Street – east – Maroochydore | Eastern terminus of Maroochydore Road |
1.000 mi = 1.609 km; 1.000 km = 0.621 mi
