= Mundubbera–Durong Road =

Road in Queensland, Australia

Mundubbera–Durong Road Queensland

General information
- Type: Rural road
- Length: 105 km (65 mi)
- Route number(s): State Route 75

Major junctions
- North end: Burnett Highway, Mundubbera
- Boondooma Road, and to Gayndah–Mundubbera Road; Manar Road; Proston–Boondooma Road
- South end: Chinchilla–Wondai Road, Durong

Location(s)
- Major settlements: Boynewood, Derri Derra, Beeron, Brovinia, Boondooma

Mundubbera–Durong Road is a continuous 105-kilometre (65 mi) road route in the North Burnett and South Burnett local government areas of Queensland, Australia. It is signed as State Route 75. It is a state-controlled regional road (number 435). It has been designated as a road of strategic importance by the Federal Government.

== Route description ==
The road starts at an intersection with the Burnett Highway in the locality of Mundubbera in the North Burnett region. It runs south through the town, where it is known as Strathdee Street, then crosses the Burnett River and enters the locality of Boynewood. It runs generally south-west through Boynewood, passing the exit to Boondooma Road (Note: Boondooma Road runs south from Boynewood, passing through Glenrae, Old Cooranga and Toondahra before entering Boondooma, where its name changes to Manar Road.) (which leads to Gayndah–Mundubbera Road) (Note: Gayndah–Mundubbera Road runs east from Boynewood to the Burnett Highway in Gayndah, keeping to the south of the Burnett River.) to the south-east, then crossing the Boyne River on the John Peterson Bridge and entering Derri Derra. Continuing generally south, the road passes through Derri Derra and the north-west corner of Beeron before transiting the south-eastern corner of Brovinia. Next it crosses the regional and locality boundary, entering Boondooma in the South Burnett region. It turns south-east to Boondooma village, passing the exit to Manar Road to the north-east, and then south towards Durong, passing the exit to Proston-Boondooma Road to the east. Continuing south through Durong it ends at an intersection with the Chinchilla–Wondai Road.

The road is fully sealed to a major road (two lane) standard.

A project to replace a single lane timber bridge (John Peterson Bridge) with a new two lane concrete structure was under construction in January 2022. The bridge was opened in June 2023.

This road is part of the shortest route from the Warrego Highway at Dalby to the Bruce Highway at Calliope, and also from Dalby to Biloela.

== History ==
Mundubbera pastoral run was established in 1848. A town reserve was established in 1861, but closer settlement did not occur until the early 1900s, spurred by the imminent arrival of the railway.

Beeron (or Beerone) pastoral run was established by 1856.

Brovinia (or Brorinia) pastoral run was established about 1850.

Boondooma pastoral run was established in 1846. A large part of Boondooma was resumed for closer settlement in 1885.

Burrandowan pastoral run was established in 1843. It occupied at least part of what is now the locality of Durong. Parts of Burrandowan were resumed in the 1890s to encourage closer settlement. Further resumptions were made in 1917 to provide land for the Soldier Settlement Scheme.

== Intersecting state-controlled road ==
Proston–Boondooma Road intersects with Mundubbera–Durong Road.

=== Proston–Boondooma Road ===
Proston–Boondooma Road
- Location: Wondai–Proston Road, Proston to Mundubbera–Durong Road, Boondooma
- Length: 39.5 km (24.5 mi)

Proston-Boondooma Road is a state controlled district road (number 4356). It runs from the intersection of Okeden Road (Boondooma Dam Road) and Wondai–Proston Road in Proston to Mundubbera–Durong Road in Boondooma, a distance of 39.5 kilometres (24.5 mi), via Okeden, Coverty and Brigooda. It has no major intersections.

== Associated state-controlled roads ==
The following state-controlled roads are associated with the intersecting road described above:

- Intersecting with Proston–Boondooma Road:
  - Okeden Road (Boondooma Dam Road)
- Continuation of Proston–Boondooma Road:
  - Wondai–Proston Road
- Intersecting with Wondai-Proston Road:
  - Byee Road
- Intersecting with Byee Road:
  - Murgon–Gayndah Road

=== Okeden Road ===
Okeden Road
- Location: Wondai–Proston Road, Proston to Boondooma Dam entrance, Boondooma
- Length: 20.3 km (12.6 mi)

Okeden Road (Boondooma Dam Road) is a state-controlled district road (number 4364) rated as a local road of regional significance (LRRS). It runs from the intersection of Wondai–Proston Road and Proston–Boondooma Road in Proston to the Boondooma Dam entrance in Boondooma, a distance of 20.3 kilometres (12.6 mi). It has no major intersections.

=== Wondai–Proston Road ===
Wondai–Proston Road
- Location: Bunya Highway, Wondai to Proston–Boondooma Road, Proston
- Length: 36.3 km (22.6 mi)

Wondai–Proston Road is a state-controlled district road (number 436) rated as a local road of regional significance (LRRS). It runs from the Bunya Highway in Wondai to the intersection of Okenden Road and Proston–Boondooma Road in Proston, a distance of 36.3 kilometres (22.6 mi). It intersects with Byee Road as it leaves Wondai.

=== Byee Road ===
Byee Road
- Location: Wondai–Proston Road, Wondai to Murgon–Gayndah Road, Merlwood
- Length: 14.5 km (9.0 mi)

Byee Road is a state-controlled district road (number 4365) rated as a local road of regional significance (LRRS). It runs from Wondai–Proston Road in Wondai to Murgon–Gayndah Road in Merlwood, a distance of 14.5 kilometres (9.0 mi). It has no major intersections.

=== Murgon–Gayndah Road ===
Murgon–Gayndah Road
- Location: Bunya Highway, Murgon to Burnett Highway, Booubyjan
- Length: 42.1 km (26.2 mi)

Murgon–Gayndah Road is a state-controlled regional road (number 439). It runs from the Bunya Highway in Murgon to the Burnett Highway in Booubyjan, a distance of 42.1 kilometres (26.2 mi). This intersection is about 58.8 kilometres (36.5 mi) southeast of Gayndah. This road intersects with Byee Road in Merlwood. It has no other major intersections.

== Major intersections ==
All distances are from Google Maps.

LGA	Location	km	mi	Destinations	Notes
North Burnett	Mundubbera	0	0.0	Burnett Highway – northwest – Eidsvold – east – Gayndah	Northern end of Mundubbera–Durong Road. Road continues south as State Route 75.
North Burnett	Boynewood	3.2	2.0	Boondooma Road – southeast – Glenrae, Old Cooranga, Toondahra, Boondooma, and to Gayndah–Mundubbera Road – east – Gayndah, Burnett Highway	Road continues south-west.
South Burnett	Boondooma	81.8	50.8	Manar Road – northeast – Manar Off Road Park, Toondahra, Old Cooranga, Glenrae, Boynewood	Road continues south east.
South Burnett	Boondooma	89.8	55.8	Proston–Boondooma Road – east – Brigooda, Proston	Road continues south.
South Burnett	Durong	105	65	Chinchilla–Wondai Road – west – Jinghi, Jandowae, Chinchilla – east – Tingoora, Wondai.	Southern end of Mundubbera–Durong Road.
1.000 mi = 1.609 km; 1.000 km = 0.621 mi

== See also ==
- List of numbered roads in Queensland
