= Boondooma Homestead =

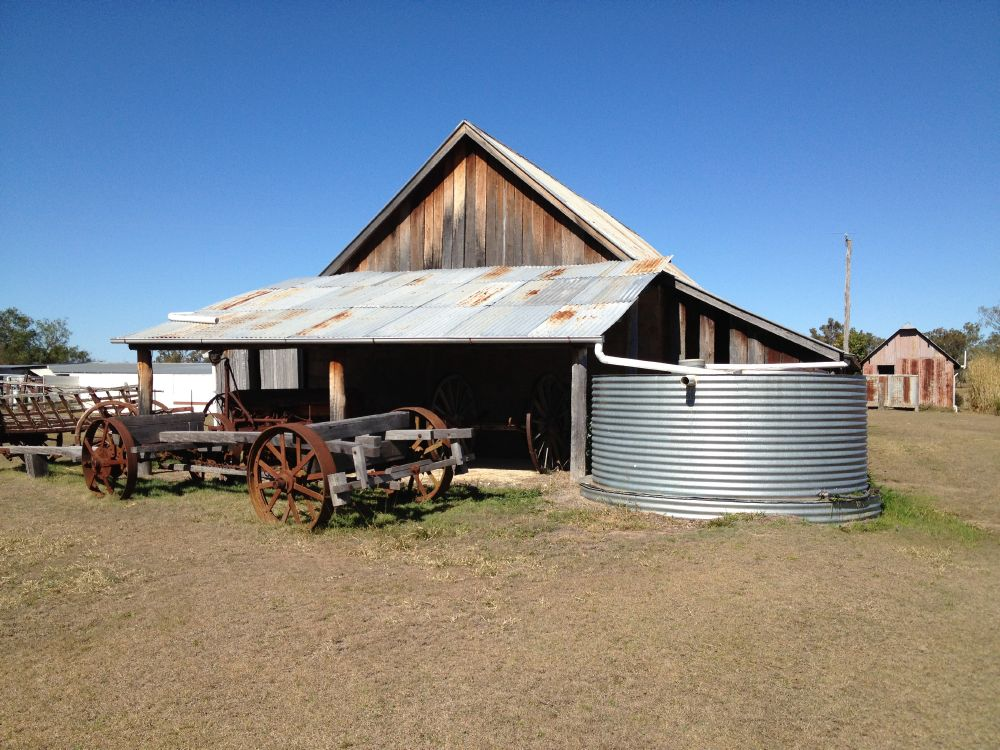
- Boondooma Homestead, 2013

- Location within Queensland Location within Australia
- 26.2024°S 151.2932°E
- Location: Mundubbera–Durong Road, Boondooma, South Burnett Region, Queensland, Australia

History
- Design period: 1840s–1860s (mid-19th century)
- Built: 1850s–1870s

Queensland Heritage Register
- Official name: Boondooma Homestead
- Type: state heritage (built, landscape)
- Designated: 21 October 1992
- Reference no.: 600967
- Significant period: 1850s–1913 (historical) ongoing (social)
- Significant components: decorative finishes, post office, graveyard, kitchen/kitchen house, residential accommodation – main house, meat house, out building/s, garden/grounds, cow bails, yards – livestock, trees/plantings, orchard, store/s / storeroom / storehouse, fencing

Boondooma Homestead is a heritage-listed homestead at Mundubbera–Durong Road, Boondooma, South Burnett Region, Queensland, Australia. It was built from the 1850s to the 1870s. It was added to the Queensland Heritage Register on 21 October 1992.

== History ==
Boondooma Homestead is located on the Mundubbera–Durong Road in Boondooma. The Boondooma Run was originally taken up in 1846 by the Lawson brothers and Robert Alexander, and the homestead site today includes a number of historic buildings, including a stone building and timber house erected in the 1850s, and several timber outbuildings.

Searches for pastoral land in Queensland extended north in the early 1840s after the Moreton Bay region was opened for selection following the closure of the penal colony. Initial leases were taken up in the Moreton Bay, Darling Downs and Brisbane Valley regions and by 1842, explorations such as those led by Henry Stuart Russell had spread further north.

Russell first came to Queensland in 1840 to stay with cousins on the Darling Downs, and in the subsequent year established Eton Vale on the Downs in partnership with his brother, Sydenham. In conjunction with others Russell made exploratory expeditions to the Wide Bay area and in 1842 he was the first European to pass through what was later to become Boondooma whilst exploring the area west of Tiaro with William H Orton and an Aborigine named Jemmy. In the following year, he took up Burrandowan run on the Borne River as a sheep station and other squatters soon followed his example in establishing themselves in the area. Two of these were brothers Alexander Robertson Lawson and Robert Lawson, who set up Boondooma Station as a sheep run in 1846 along with Robert Alexander. Temporary huts and sheds were erected on the site and by 1851 Boondooma comprised the runs of Boondooma, Jua, Waringa and Waagineraganya, while Piar, Dangarabungy and Weir Weir were subsequently acquired. The Boondooma lease was applied for on 31 October 1851 by the Lawson brothers and Alexander, and approved the following year. In 1863 the lease remained in the Lawson family but was transferred to Alexander Robertson Lawson solely. Four years later, in 1867, Boondooma lease was transferred to William Oswald Gilchrist and John Young, before being transferred to Gilchrist solely in 1872 and then held jointly by Gilchrist and John Brown Watt in 1888. It seems unlikely that Gilchrist, Young or Watt resided at the property and it continued to be managed by the Lawsons until 1870 when they were succeeded by George Munro.

Despite an outbreak of scab in 1853 which caused the loss of 17,000 sheep, the property prospered during this early period as a successful sheep run. A wool scour and pressing plant were established on the Boyne River, allowing wool to be cleaned and baled before being backloaded by teamsters who arrived with supplies. This continued until the early 1890s when, due to the spread of spear grass, the owners were forced to dispose of the sheep and restock with cattle.

The period from the 1850s to the 1870s was in general an era of expansion for Boondooma and this is reflected in its physical growth at the time. In November 1855, Alexander Robertson Lawson married Emily Mountford Ball and the following year a son named Robert was born. By that time, it seems plans had already been made to replace an earlier house, which was reputedly located on an area archaeologically identified as being later used for a fowl house, with a larger residence to accommodate the Lawson family. Station correspondence from this period reveals building supplies and furniture being ordered in September 1855, including door hinges, locks, handles, window glass, wallpaper, calico for the wooden walls, a drawing room table and chairs, a hand basin, cooking stove, and bath. By late 1856, the Boondooma wages book indicates that 2 carpenters, John Groom and John Moules, were employed at the station. Both carpenters worked at Boondooma until mid-1857, along with a team of 5 other tradesmen under their supervision, and it is most likely that the main timber house, which is still standing, was constructed during this period.

At much the same time, it seems the stone storeroom and an adjoining timber meat house were also being erected. The stone building was constructed from roughly coursed local rock obtained from a nearby quarry, sawn timbers, logs, and antbed, and was built by Wilhelm Brill, a stonemason. Brill was born in Germany in 1811 and arrived in Brisbane on 12 January 1853 on board the Johan Caesar. With his family, Brill first moved to Toowoomba before making his way to Boondooma by August 1855. In the mid-1850s, the Lawsons were actively recruiting German workers owing to the general "scarcity of labour and the satisfaction those already in our service have given us" and the Boondooma wages book shows Brill was employed as a stonemason from 24 May 1856 to 21 July 1857. He remained at the station until 1861 working as a shepherd, thereafter moving to Ipswich and then to Toowoomba where he died in 1886. The main stone structure remains well preserved and Brill's familiarity with metric dimensions makes this building one of the earliest in Queensland constructed to metric standards.

Although Boondooma was not officially registered as a postal receiving office until 1900, the structure commonly referred to as the post office was built during the early 1860s after Joseph Booth won the contract for the weekly postal run to serve the Burnett district, which passed through Boondooma. Extensions to this building were added during the 1950s. Another structure from the 1860s is often referred to as the cook's room. It was a three-panelled building originally used as a dairy, wash house and cook's room, and the only extant physical remain is one standing post.

A separate dining room and cooling shed were reputedly built on the site during the 1870s. The dining room was later used as a kitchen and at some stage was linked to the homestead by a covered walkway. Adjacent to the dining room was a cooling shed built at much the same time from Cyprus pine and with a wooden shingle roof which has since been replaced by corrugated iron.

In 1885, the consolidated Boondooma holding was brought under the provisions of the Crown Lands Act of 1884 and was accordingly divided into 259 square miles (670 km^{2}) of leased land in the name of Gilchrist and Watt and 249 square miles (640 km^{2}) of resumed area. At this time, George Munro served as manager of Boondooma and was succeeded by his son, Peter Munro, in 1895. George Munro died on 24 March 1895 at Boondooma and his grave and tombstone remain on the site.

In 1898 the lease to Boondooma was obtained by EJ McConnel, a member of the well-known Cressbrook Pastoral Company, and when title was transferred in 1904, it was to DC McConnel & Sons. The McConnel family were pioneer pastoralists in the Brisbane River Valley, establishing Cressbrook in 1841, the first sheep run in the district. The company of DC McConnel and Sons was established by David Cannon McConnel prior to his death in 1885 in partnership with his sons James Henry, David Rose, Eric Walter and Edward John, and daughter Mary McLeod Banks. None of the McConnel family ever resided at Boondooma and it was immediately used as collateral for a stock mortgage of £160,000. David Stevens served as manager of the station from 1898 to 1908, succeeded by Archie Graham.

In 1905, the government resumed a further 60 square miles (160 km^{2}) of Boondooma, reducing the holding to 198 square miles (510 km^{2}). Three years later a further 42 square miles (110 km^{2}) of land was resumed from Boondooma, at which time the station was released from the mortgage acquired in 1904 and operated by the Marshlands Pastoral Company, which had 3 McConnel family members as shareholders.

In 1913, when the lease on Boondooma expired, it was thrown open for selection. A large portion was retained by the McConnels, including the homestead block, but in 1922 the lease was again open for selection with Fred Palethorpe, who became Deputy Commissioner of Police, successful in obtaining the homestead site. From Palethorpe the property was transferred to Jane Ann Thomson in the mid-1920s and then to her son, Edward Thomson. During the Thomsons' time at Boondooma it was used as a dairy farm as well as for growing cotton and rearing cattle. In 1975, the Wondai Shire Council received a Federal Government grant to acquire the site and the Council in association with the Boondooma Historical Society have since maintained an ongoing programme of conservation.

Over the years since the establishment of the Boondooma Run in 1846, land resumptions and tenure changes have resulted in the reduction of the homestead site to its present size. It remains, however, a site of significant historical value. Although natural deterioration and an auction held in 1919 to sell the jackaroo quarters, buggy shed, blacksmith's shop and several other ancillary structures have reduced the number of extant structures at Boondooma, there remains on the site a number of buildings which are important in reflecting Queensland's early pastoral development. The importance of this site has been recognized by the formation of the Boondooma Homestead Committee, instituted to facilitate the ongoing conservation of the homestead and surrounding buildings, and the receipt in 2001 of a Community Garden Grants Award.

== Description ==
The Boondooma Homestead complex is located near the junction of Boondooma Creek and the Boyne River, in a corridor of land between the two waterways that is less than 1 kilometre (0.62 mi) wide. Part of the Boyne River has been dammed to create the Boondooma Dam, which is adjacent to the Homestead site. Its eastern boundary is situated on the Mundubbera- Durong Road, approximately 75 kilometres (47 mi) west of the town of Wondai, which is 31 kilometres (19 mi) north of Kingaroy.

The principal surviving buildings in the homestead complex include a stone building and timber house from the 1850s; a dining room erected during the 1870s, a walkway between the house and the dining room; a cooling shed; cow bails (prior to 1939 used as stables); a structure which functioned as a postal receiving office from the 1860s; and a garage built in the 1950s. The various built elements are disposed around the site according to their functional relationship to one another.

=== Stone Building ===
The stone building is located at the southern end of the property, furthermost from the Mundubbera-Durong Road. In plan it comprises a rectangular core of random rubble laid in rough courses, which is flanked by a verandah on each long side. The verandah roof to the south-west is continuous with the main gabled roof, while that to the north-east is separate, meeting the core's wall just below the eaves line. The pitch on both verandah roofs is slightly reduced from that of the main roof. All bargeboards are timber. A single line of guttering is fixed to the north-eastern edge of the main roof. All these roofs are clad in corrugated galvanised iron. The timber rafters are exposed on the interior, and some battening from the original shingle roof is still evident.

The walls of the central core are constructed of large sections of stone arranged roughly in courses, between which smaller pieces have been inserted. The whole construction is jointed with mortar made from termite mounds (antbed). The stonework continues to the underside of the main roof, except at each gable end where roughly sawn, vertical timber slabs have been fixed. The lean-to verandahs have post and sapling frames and are enclosed with vertical timber slabs on the western ends of their northern and southern facades, and on their short western facades.

All windows and doors have timber lintels and frames. The windows have shutters made of vertical timber slabs, which open onto the interior. They also have vertical iron bars. A window in the north- eastern facade has horizontal and vertical bars. A 1997 archaeological investigation suggests that the timber posts remaining adjacent to the south-western facade were part of the adjoining meat house.

Internally, the core space comprises one large room with unlined walls and exposed timber roof framing. A number of ironbark roof ties are in place. Paint on the stonework may be indicative of previous partitioning. The floor is constructed of wide, hardwood shot-edge boards. Beneath this lining are timber joists and bearers.

=== Timber House ===
The single-storey house has a broken-back, hipped roof clad in corrugated galvanised iron. A detached single-storey kitchen, with a similarly clad pyramid roof, is centred adjacent to its south-western facade. This roof has a simple vent piece fitted at its peak. A small, skillion-roofed structure is also appended to its south-eastern face. At the western corner of the house, between the kitchen building and another skillion-roofed extension, a covered walkway is attached. This structure links the house to a dining room to its north-west, and is constructed of a post and sapling frame with a curved corrugated iron roof. A short section of the walkway roof, close to the house, is no longer in place.

The underside of the front verandah roof is not lined, revealing that a great number of the original timber shingles remain in place under the roof sheeting. The deterioration of this verandah floor, which is lined with shot-edge timber boards like the south-western one, reveals that the floor joists of the house and the timber verandah posts bear on an outer line of bedlogs.

The house is laid out with a central band of rooms running north-west to south-east along the length of the rectangle. A long, thin outer room on the north-west wraps around to take a small part of the front verandah facing north-east. This room, and a small one adjacent to it, have been formed by enclosing the former open verandah. A second verandah area remains on the south-west of the house, between the core and the kitchen building. Its southern end has been enclosed to make a small room. A large fireplace projects into this verandah space from one of the main rooms. Its lower half is clad in wide, vertical timber boards, matching those used elsewhere, and its upper half under the roof is clad in sheet steel. The steel-clad chimneystack is visible above the main roof.

The external walls are clad in a variety of materials. The north eastern facade to the verandah is clad in 8-inch (200 mm) wide chamferboards, except for a short section at its eastern end where there are wide, timber boards fitted vertically. This boarding pattern also appears on the south-western facade to the second verandah, which is adjacent to the kitchen. On the north-western facade, and partly on the north- eastern one, there are unpainted weatherboards. Unpainted, horizontal timber boards clad the south-west facing walls of the kitchen building and the small extension next to the walkway. These boards appear to fit between the exposed vertical framing members. The timber wall framing is also exposed on each verandah. The skillion-roofed extension on the south-east of the house is clad in roughly sawn, unpainted timber slabs fitted vertically. Some corrugated iron has been fixed to the remainder of the south-eastern facade of the house, where the brick fireplace has collapsed.

Four sets of French or double doors open from the three central rooms onto the north-eastern verandah, while two open onto the south-west facing one. The internal doors are four-panelled with simple bolection mouldings. The timber-framed windows, some of which have fixed-louvre shutters, are generally casement with three or four panes. Joinery to the main section of the house, incorporating the three main rooms, is finely detailed and includes a variety of mouldings. The wall framing is exposed in these rooms, and where it appears around the remaining fireplace and the doors to that room, it is finely moulded. Most joinery elements are painted in either white, or various shades of green and blue-green. The walls are constructed of wide, vertical timber boards that appear to have been stained or oiled. Numerous layers of wallpaper and backing material are evident, some of which have been papered over with magazines cuttings. Remnants of ceiling paper and associated backing materials, and various types of linoleum are also evident in some areas. The floors are largely finished with shot-edge timber boards, while the ceilings in the largest of the three rooms are finished with painted timber boards. In the room with the extant fireplace, there is a simple pattern to the floorboards around its edge. The floor to ceiling height is generally about 3 metres (9.8 ft), however in the larger room on the south- east end of the house it follows the slope of the roof for part of its length. In the main room there is a picture rail fitted at approximately 2.5 metres (8 ft 2 in) and above this the walls are lined with horizontal timber boards to match the ceiling.

The external walls to the secondary rooms, particularly those that infill the verandah space to the north-west are not lined. The internal walls they share with the main part of the house are lined to match those rooms, as are their floors. The ceilings in this external band of rooms are unlined and slope to follow the pitch of the roof. It is here, as in the verandah areas, where the shingles are visible. The walls to the detached kitchen are unlined and the framing is exposed. The boards are painted and simple mouldings fixed at the joints with the framing. The stove recess is lined with corrugated iron. Its pyramid roof ceiling is lined with unpainted, horizontal timber boards, with beading fixed at each joint.

=== Other Timber Structures on Homestead Site ===
The other remaining timber structures on the homestead site are similar in terms of design and construction techniques; incorporating post and sapling frames, corrugated iron roof sheeting, and walls lined with vertical and horizontal slabs and weatherboards. Some of the walls to the covered walkway are clad in corrugated iron, while parts of its floor is made with wide, roughly sawn timber slabs apparently laid on the ground. The small, gable-roofed structure to the north-west of the timber house (originally a dining room) currently has open walls, with some wall slab remnants located nearby. Its gables are in-filled with steel mesh. Adjacent to the south-west face of this structure is the cooling shed, which was a part of the creamery. This is also a small gable-roofed structure, however its gables are filled with weatherboards, and its walls are clad in rough-sawn timber slabs fitted horizontally between the exposed frame.

To the south-east of the timber house is located the milk or cow bails, and the stockyards. This building is a long rectangle in plan, is gable-roofed and its end walls are clad in rough-sawn timber slabs fitted vertically. There are timber posts and rails still evident inside the shed and marking the pens of the stockyards. The post office is located west of the cow bails. It also is a gable-roofed structure with an attached skillion-roofed garage and awning. The post office walls are clad in rough-sawn timber slabs, fitted vertically, while its gables are clad in weatherboards. The garage walls are also clad in weatherboards. Further west is a stand-alone garage structure with a skillion roof and unevenly clad walls matching those of the post office.

== Grounds ==
The grounds in which the homestead complex is located shows evidence of a formally laid out garden comprising an orchard of citrus trees, and mature plantings such as blackbean, bottle, oak, pine and pepperina trees. Trellises for grape vines, garden beds and various fences are also evident located adjacent to the timber house.

== Heritage listing ==
Boondooma Homestead was listed on the Queensland Heritage Register on 21 October 1992 having satisfied the following criteria.

The place is important in demonstrating the evolution or pattern of Queensland's history.

Boondooma station was established in 1846 by the Lawson brothers and Robert Alexander in the wake of Henry Stuart Russell's exploration of the Burnett River district in 1842. The Boondooma Homestead site stands as important surviving evidence of the early exploration and settlement of the Upper Burnnett region, and its buildings are indicative of early pastoral life in Queensland. The physical growth of the site reflects periods of economic prosperity in Queensland, whilst periods of rural hardship can be reflected in the abandonment and sale of structures.

The place demonstrates rare, uncommon or endangered aspects of Queensland's cultural heritage.

Boondooma comprises built elements that are now uncommon examples of construction methods and techniques. The principal historic buildings include an 1850s stone storehouse, which is both rare in its method of construction and an early example of the use of the metric standard in Queensland. The main house and the post office are also important surviving structures. The survival of interior finishes in the main timber house, including wallpapers and linoleums, contributes to its rarity.

The place has potential to yield information that will contribute to an understanding of Queensland's history.

The site remains a good example of the early vernacular homestead and contains a range of ancillary buildings in varying states of preservation. It provides present generations the opportunity to observe and understand the operation of early pastoral stations, and through further historical and archaeological research the site also has the potential to yield information that will contribute to an understanding of early European settlement in the Burnett region.

The place is important in demonstrating the principal characteristics of a particular class of cultural places.

The Boondooma site is an example of a homestead setting, with remnants of other structures including various outbuildings, graves, fences and mature trees. The relationship between these elements contributes to an understanding of early station life and as such it is important in demonstrating the principal characteristics of a particular class of cultural places.

The place is important because of its aesthetic significance.

The Homestead site provides a relatively well-preserved and vivid example of vernacular architecture of the Queensland pastoral frontier and its aesthetic significance is enhanced by the ongoing preservation of the site. The individual buildings that remain reveal a high degree of workmanship and design. The use of local resources for building, as evidenced most notably in the stone building on the site in which rubble obtained from a nearby quarry and antbed are used for construction, demonstrates a high degree of skill and highlights the adaptive lifestyle of Queensland's pastoral pioneers.

The place has a strong or special association with a particular community or cultural group for social, cultural or spiritual reasons.

Boondooma remains valued by the local community for its strong and very important links with early pioneers of the Burnett district, including the Lawson family.
