= Beeron, Queensland =

Beeron
- Suburb
- Interactive map of Beeron
- Coordinates: 25.9011°S 151.2774°E
- Country: Australia
- State: Queensland
- LGA: North Burnett Region
- Location: 71.1 km (44.2 mi) SW of Gayndah; 218 km (135 mi) SW of Bundaberg; 266 km (165 mi) N of Toowoomba; 393 km (244 mi) NW of Brisbane

Government
  - State electorate: Callide
  - Federal division: Flynn

Area
  - Total: 402.2 km^{2} (155.3 sq mi)

Population
  - Total: 34 (2021 census)
  - Density: 0.0845/km^{2} (0.219/sq mi)
- Time zone: UTC+10:00 (AEST)
- Postcode: 4626
Suburbs around Beeron
Brovinia	Derri Derra	Old Cooranga
Brovinia	Beeron	Toondahra
Brovinia	Boondooma	Boondooma

Beeron is a rural locality in the North Burnett Region, Queensland, Australia. In the 2021 census, Beeron had a population of 34 people.

== Geography ==
The Boyne River forms the north-eastern boundary.

The Mundubbera–Durong Road (State Route 75) enters the locality from the north (Derri Derra) and exits to north-west of the locality (Brovinia).

The Beeron National Park occupies the south-eastern corner. Apart from this protected area, the predominant land use is grazing on native vegetation.

== History ==
The locality's name derives from a pastoral run name held in 1856 by William Strathdee. In 1872, it was written as Beerone but by 1878 it had become Beeron.

Beeron Road Provisional School opened on 5 September 1927. In 1952 it became Beeron Road State School. It closed on 11 December 1987. It was at 1070 Beeron Road (25.7303°S 151.30033°E) now in Derri Derra. The school grounds are used as a sports and recreation area under the control of the North Burnett Regional Council.

Derrarabungy Provisional School opened open on 14 March 1932 and closed in 1942. It was to the north-west of where Beeron Road crosses Derrarabungy Creek (25.84823°S 151.30011°E).

== Demographics ==
In the 2016 census, Beeron had a population of 14 people.

In the 2021 census, Beeron had a population of 34 people.

== Education ==
There are no schools in Beeron. The nearest government primary schools are Boynewood State School in Boynewood to the north and Durong South State School in Durong to the south. The nearest government secondary schools are Mundubbera State College (to Year 10) in Mundubbera to the north, Burnett State College (to Year 12) in Gayndah to the north-east, and Eidsvold State School (to Year 12) in Eidsvold to the north-west.
