= Acacia everistii =

Scientific classification
- Kingdom: Plantae
- Clade: Tracheophytes
- Clade: Angiosperms
- Clade: Eudicots
- Clade: Rosids
- Order: Fabales
- Family: Fabaceae
- Subfamily: Caesalpinioideae
- Clade: Mimosoid clade
- Genus: Acacia
- Species: A. everistii

Binomial name
- Acacia everistii Pedley
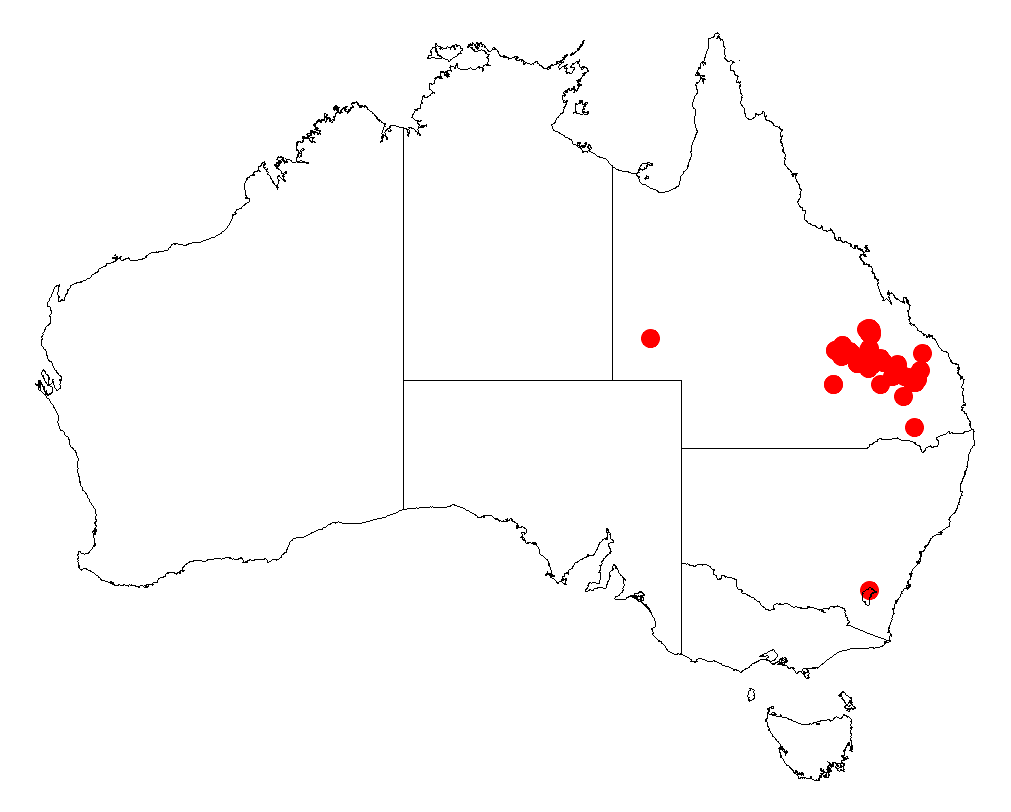
- Occurrence data from AVH

Synonyms
- Racosperma everistii (Pedley) Pedley

Species of legume

Acacia everistii is a species of flowering plant in the family Fabaceae and is endemic to south-eastern Queensland, Australia. It is a sparingly branched shrub with glabrous and often glaucous branchlets, silvery green, elliptic or egg-shaped phyllodes, heads of yellow flowers, and flat pods with thickened margins.

== Description ==
Acacia everistii is a sparingly branched shrub that typically grows to a height of up to 3 m (9.8 ft) and has angular glabrous, and often glaucous branchlets. Its phyllodes are elliptic or egg-shaped with the narrower end towards the base, 25–50 mm (0.98–1.97 in) long and 10–20 mm (0.39–0.79 in) wide with a prominent gland 7–20 mm (0.28–0.79 in) from the base of the phyllode. There are small, triangular stipules at the base of the phyllodes but that fall off as the phyllode matures. The flowers are borne in 12 to 24 heads of flowers in axils in racemes 30–80 mm (1.2–3.1 in) long on a peduncle 3–4 mm (0.12–0.16 in) long, each head with 12 to 18 yellow flowers. Flowering occurs in August and September, and the pods are flat, up to 90 mm (3.5 in) long and 8–9 mm (0.31–0.35 in) wide with thickened margins.

== Taxonomy ==
Acacia everistii was first formally described in 1980 by Leslie Pedley in the journal Austrobaileya from specimens collected 21 km (13 mi) from Cracow on the road to Taroom in 1962. The specific epithet (everistii) "honours Dr. Selwyn Everist (1913–1981), a former director of Queensland Herbarium".

== Distribution and habitat ==
This species of Acacia is uncommon, and occurs from near Brovinia and north-west to the Expedition Range on the Blackdown Tableland. It grows in sand or sandy loam in forest or open woodland in south-eastern Queensland.

== Conservation status ==
Acacia everistii is listed as of "least concern" under the Queensland Government Nature Conservation Act 1992.

== See also ==
- List of Acacia species
