= Durah, Queensland =

Durah
- Suburb
- Interactive map of Durah
- Coordinates: 26.3133°S 150.9566°E
- Country: Australia
- State: Queensland
- LGA: Western Downs Region
- Location: 63.6 km (39.5 mi) N of Jandowae; 80.4 km (50.0 mi) NNE of Chinchilla; 158 km (98 mi) N of Dalby; 195 km (121 mi) NNW of Toowoomba; 323 km (201 mi) NW of Brisbane

Government
  - State electorate: Callide
  - Federal division: Maranoa

Area
  - Total: 418.3 km^{2} (161.5 sq mi)

Population
  - Total: 0 (2021 census)
  - Density: 0.0000/km^{2} (0.0000/sq mi)
- Time zone: UTC+10:00 (AEST)
- Postcode: 4413
Suburbs around Durah
| Kragra | Cadarga | Boondooma |
| Barakula | Durah | Burra Burri |
| Fairyland | Burra Burri | Burra Burri |

Durah is a locality in the Western Downs Region, Queensland, Australia. In the 2021 census, Durah had "no people or a very low population".

== Geography ==
Most of the locality is with the Barakula State Forest, except for an area of grazing on native vegetation.

== History ==
The locality was named after a pastoral run held in the early 1850s by Thorne and Ridler who also held the adjoining Darr and Ballon runs. The name is believed to be of Aboriginal origin, meaning thigh. In an 1883 map, the Durah run appears with Durah Creek flowing through it and joining Charleys Creek to the south. It is not known whether the creek (with gully and waterhole), or the run was named first.

Fairyland West Provisional School opened on 1 May 1941, becoming Fairyland West State School on 26 April 1957. It closed in 1980. It was located on Fairyland School Road, just east of Charleys Creek (approx 26.4525°S 150.8886°E). Despite the name, the school's location is now within Durah.

== Demographics ==
In the 2016 census, Durah had a population of 6 people.

In the 2021 census, Durah had "no people or a very low population".

== Education ==
There are no schools in Durah. The nearest government primary schools are Burra Burri State School in neighbouring Burra Burri to the south-east and Monogorilby State School in Monogorilby to the north. There are no nearby schools providing education to Year 12; the alternatives are distance education and boarding school.

Concordia Lutheran College's Ballon Outdoor Education Campus is in Durah (26.4317°S 150.8623°E).
