= Auburn, Queensland =

Auburn
- Suburb
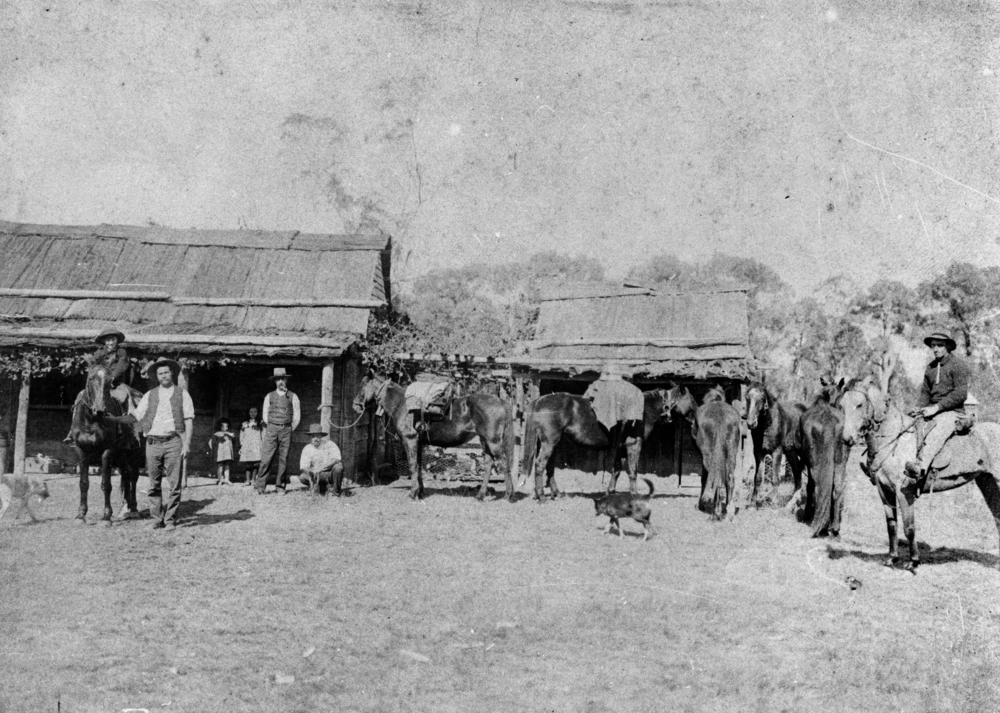
- Drovers at Auburn Station, circa 1900

- Interactive map of Auburn
- Coordinates: 25.9875°S 150.4975°E
- Country: Australia
- State: Queensland
- LGA: Western Downs Region
- Location: 63.6 km (39.5 mi) ENE of Wandoan; 101 km (63 mi) W of Monogorilby; 190 km (120 mi) NNW of Dalby; 273 km (170 mi) NNW of Toowoomba; 401 km (249 mi) NW of Brisbane

Government
  - State electorate: Callide
  - Federal division: Maranoa

Area
  - Total: 1,157.5 km^{2} (446.9 sq mi)

Population
  - Total: 23 (2021 census)
  - Density: 0.0199/km^{2} (0.0515/sq mi)
- Time zone: UTC+10:00 (AEST)
- Postcode: 4413
Suburbs around Auburn
Bungaban	Sujeewong	Hawkwood
Bungaban	Auburn	Kragra
Roche Creek	Barakula	Kragra

Auburn is a rural locality in the Western Downs Region, Queensland, Australia. In the 2021 census, Auburn had a population of 23 people.

Auburn's postcode is 4413.

== Geography ==
The Auburn River enters the locality from the north (Sujeewong) and flows through the north-east of the locality, exiting to the north-east (Hawkwood). The Auburn Homestead is located along the river (25.9500°S 150.6166°E).

There are a number of state forests within the locality:

- Rosehall State Forest (2 sections) in the north-east of the locality
- Warranna State Forest in the centre of the locality
- Barakula State Forest in the south-west, south, and south-east of the locality

Apart from these protected areas, the land use is predominantly grazing on native vegetation.

== Demographics ==
In the 2016 census, Auburn had a population of 26 people.

In the 2021 census, Auburn had a population of 23 people.

== Education ==
There are no schools in Auburn. The nearest government schools are Monogorilby State School (Prep to Year 6) in Monogorilby to the east and Wandoan State School (Prep to Year 10) in Wandoan to the west. However, these schools would be too distant from most parts of Auburn. Also there are no nearby schools offering education to Year 12. The alternatives are distance education and boarding school.
