= Hawkwood, Queensland =

Hawkwood
- Suburb
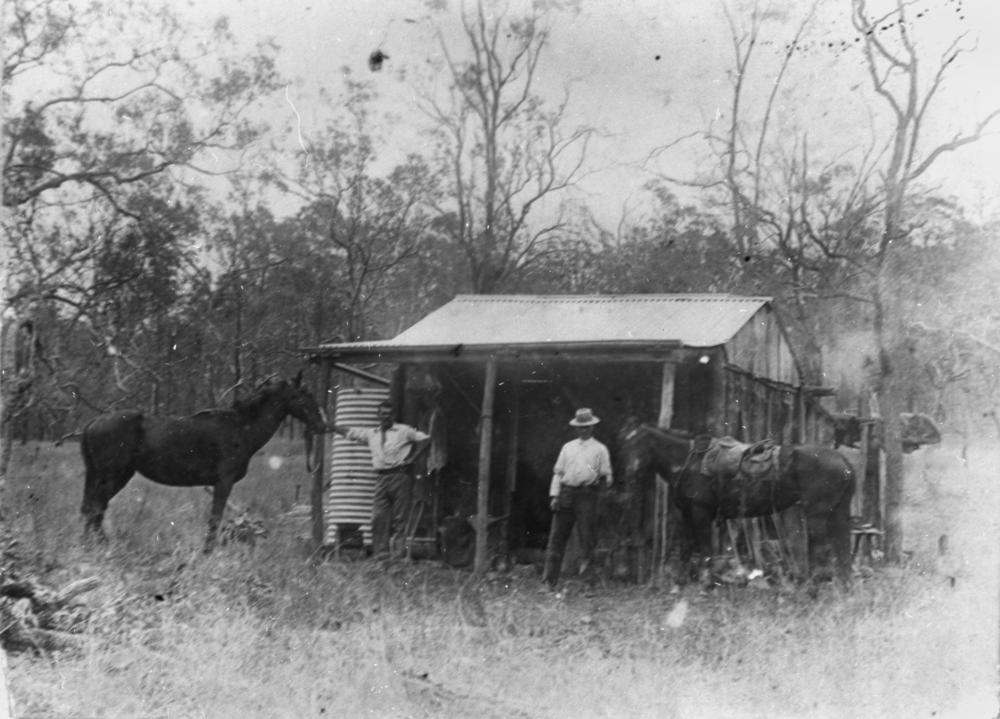
- Tending the horses outside the hut, Hawkwood, 1910

- Interactive map of Hawkwood
- Coordinates: 25.8302°S 150.8705°E
- Country: Australia
- State: Queensland
- LGA: North Burnett Region
- Location: 64.8 km (40.3 mi) WSW of Mundubbera; 98.0 km (60.9 mi) WSW of Gayndah; 245 km (152 mi) WSW of Bundaberg; 430 km (270 mi) NW of Brisbane

Government
  - State electorate: Callide
  - Federal division: Flynn

Area
  - Total: 1,186.3 km^{2} (458.0 sq mi)

Population
  - Total: 34 (2021 census)
  - Density: 0.0287/km^{2} (0.0742/sq mi)
- Time zone: UTC+10:00 (AEST)
- Postcode: 4626
Suburbs around Hawkwood
Sujeewong	Cheltenham	Dykehead
Auburn	Hawkwood	Brovinia
Auburn	Cadarga	Monogorilby; Cadarga

Hawkwood is a rural locality in the North Burnett Region, Queensland, Australia. In the 2021 census, Hawkwood had a population of 34 people.

== Geography ==
Auburn River National Park is in the north-east of the locality (25.7200°S 151.0531°E) extending into neighbouring Dykehead. Other protected areas in the locality are Delembra State Forest in the north-east of the locality (25.7368°S 150.9882°E) and Koko State Forest in the south (25.9683°S 150.8708°E) which extends into neighbouring Kragra.

Excluding the protected areas, the predominant land use is grazing on native vegetation.

Hawkwood has the following mountains:

- Mount Redhead in the east of the locality (25.8378°S 150.9094°E) 490 metres (1,610 ft) above sea level
- Mount Saul near the centre of the locality (25.8464°S 150.8096°E) 320 metres (1,050 ft) above sea level

Hawkwood Road is the major route through the locality, entering from the north-west (Dykehead) and exiting to the south-west (Auburn).

== History ==
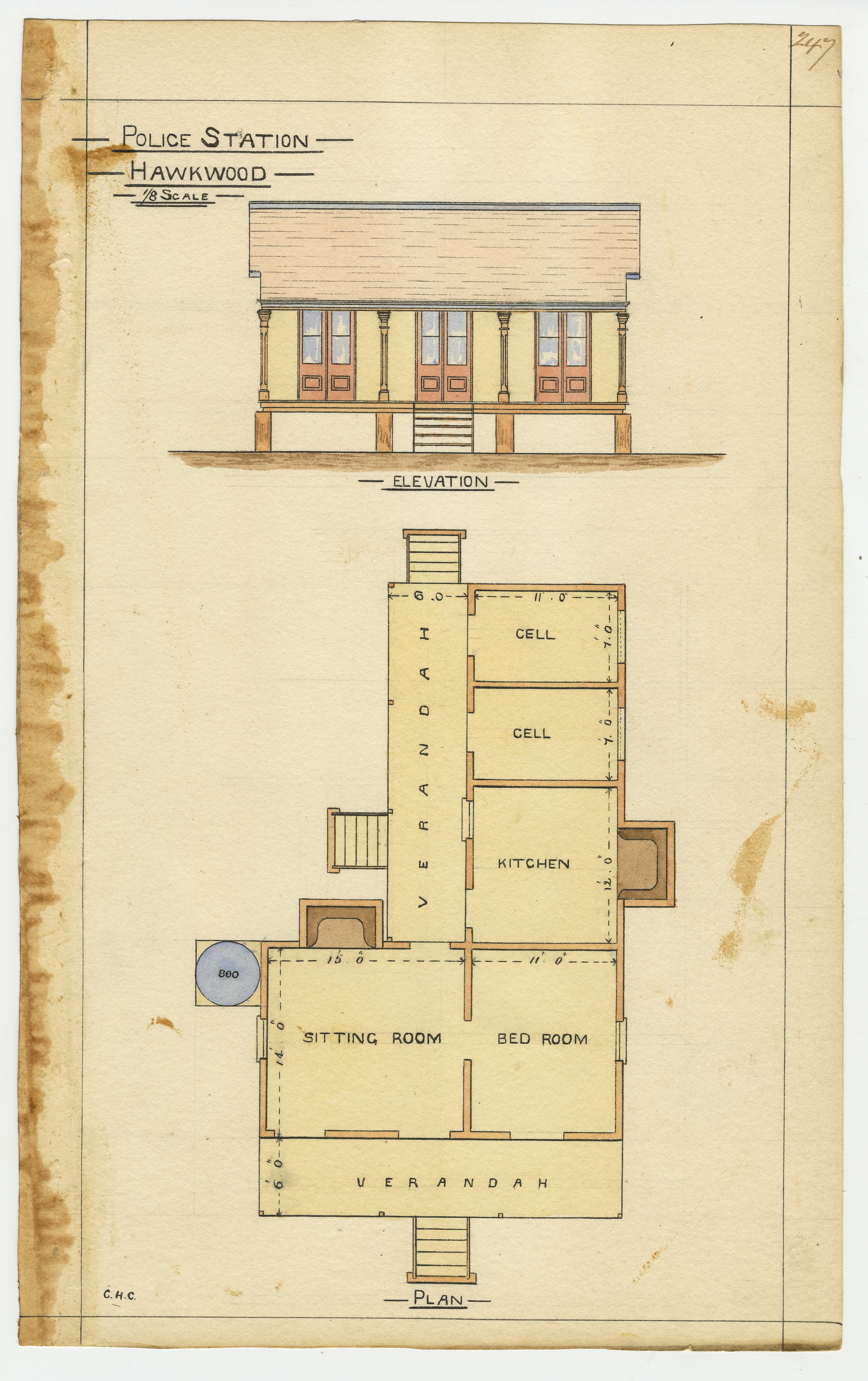
Architectural plans for Hawkwood Police Station, 1881

A police station was established in Hawkwood in 1881. However, in 1889, it was relocated to Eidsvold.

== Demographics ==
In the 2016 census, Hawkwood had a population of 27 people.

In the 2021 census, Hawkwood had a population of 34 people.

== Economy ==
There are a number of homesteads in the locality, including:

- Hawkwood (25.7753°S 150.8117°E)
- Hillgrove (25.9356°S 150.7229°E)
- Well Station (25.8953°S 150.9301°E)

== Education ==
There are no schools in Hawkwood. The nearest government primary schools are Monogorilby State School in Monogorilby to the south-east and Boynewood State School in Boynewood to the north-east. However, students in the west of Hawkwood might be too distant from these schools for a daily commute. The nearest government secondary schools are Mundubbera State College (to Year 10) in Mundubbera to the north-east and Eidsvold State School (to Year 12) in Eidsvold to the north. However, for most students in Hawkwood, these schools might be too distant for a daily commute. The alternatives to local school attendance are distance education and boarding school.

== Transport ==
Hawkwood Airstrip is near the Hawkwood homestead (25.7725°S 150.8068°E).
