= Kragra, Queensland =

Kragra
- Suburb
- Interactive map of Kragra
- Coordinates: 26.1175°S 150.7902°E
- Country: Australia
- State: Queensland
- LGA: Western Downs Region
- Location: 89.9 km (55.9 mi) N of Chinchilla; 170 km (110 mi) NNW of Dalby; 275 km (171 mi) NW of Toowoomba; 379 km (235 mi) NW of Brisbane

Government
  - State electorate: Callide
  - Federal divisions: Maranoa; Flynn

Area
  - Total: 602.5 km^{2} (232.6 sq mi)

Population
  - Total: 26 (2021 census)
  - Density: 0.0432/km^{2} (0.1118/sq mi)
- Time zone: UTC+10:00 (AEST)
- Postcode: 4413
Suburbs around Kragra
Auburn	Hawkwood	Hawkwood
Auburn	Kragra	Cadarga
Barakula	Barakula	Durah

Kragra is a rural locality in the Western Downs Region, Queensland, Australia. In the 2021 census, Kragra had a population of 26 people.

== Geography ==
The ridgline of the Great Dividing Range roughly bounds Kragra to the south. Part of the Koko State Forest (26.0571°S 150.8687°E) is in the north of the locality; the state forest extends into neighbouring Hawkwood. Part of the Jarrah State Forest is in the south-east of the locality (26.2210°S 150.8329°E), extending into neighbouring Durah.

Apart from the state forests, the predominant land use is grazing on native vegetation.

== History ==
Kragra Provisional School opened on 18 July 1955. It closed on 31 December 1974.

== Demographics ==
In the 2016 census, Kragra had a population of 27 people.

In the 2021 census, Kragra had a population of 26 people.

== Economy ==
There are a number of homesteads in the locality:

- Aqua Downs (26.0856°S 150.8684°E)
- Araluen (26.1110°S 150.7339°E)
- Bawnduggi (26.1589°S 150.8437°E)
- Glenroy (26.0715°S 150.8999°E)
- Koala (26.1088°S 150.9104°E)
- Kragra (26.1212°S 150.8652°E)
- Lismore (26.1835°S 150.7003°E)
- Ormonde (26.1457°S 150.6704°E)
- Overstone (26.1418°S 150.8397°E)
- Rawdenvale (26.1344°S 150.9027°E)
- Wambalano (26.0215°S 150.6877°E)
- Wonga Hills (26.0906°S 150.8230°E)

== Education ==
There are no schools in Kragra. The nearest government primary school is Monogorilby State School in Monogorilby to the east. There are no nearby secondary schools; distance education or boarding school are the alternatives.
