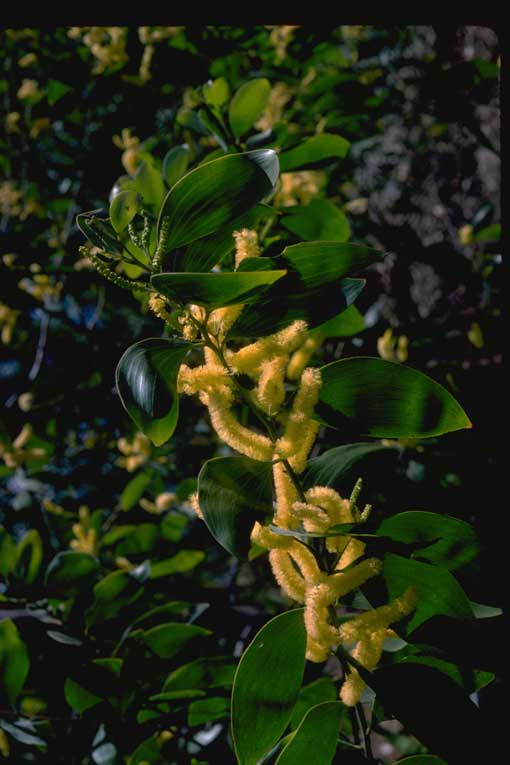
- In the Royal Botanic Gardens Sydney

Scientific classification
- Kingdom: Plantae
- Clade: Embryophytes
- Clade: Tracheophytes
- Clade: Spermatophytes
- Clade: Angiosperms
- Clade: Eudicots
- Clade: Rosids
- Order: Fabales
- Family: Fabaceae
- Subfamily: Caesalpinioideae
- Clade: Mimosoid clade
- Genus: Acacia
- Species: A. tenuinervis

Binomial name
- Acacia tenuinervis Pedley
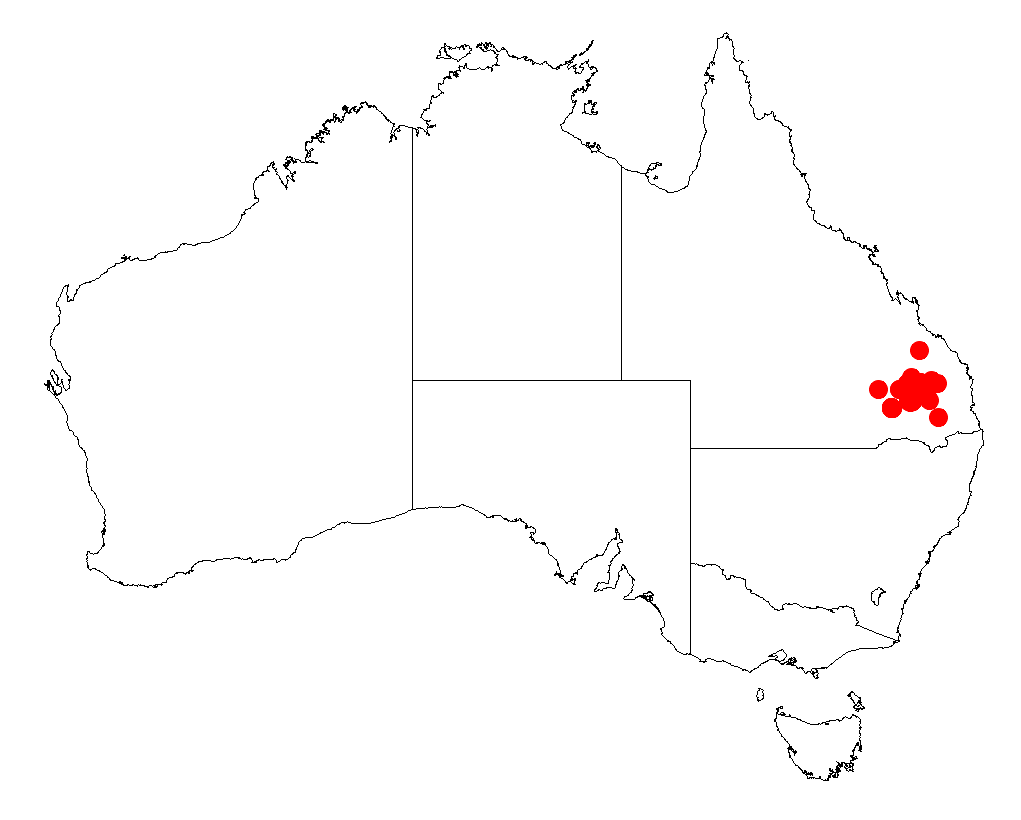
- Occurrence data from AVH

= Acacia tenuinervis =

Species of legume

Acacia tenuinervis is a shrub or tree belonging to the genus Acacia and the subgenus Juliflorae that is native to north eastern Australia.

== Description ==
The shrub or tree typically grows to a maximum height of 9 m (30 ft) and can send out root suckers. It has black to grey-brown coloured bark that is quite furrowed. The orange-red or red-brown branchlets are covered with a fine white powder are usually angular towards the apices and become glabrous and scurfy with age. Like most species of Acacia it has phyllodes rather than true leaves. The glabrous and scurfy evergreen phyllodes have a narrowly elliptic shape and are straight to sickle shaped with a length of 6.5 to 12.5 cm (2.6 to 4.9 in) and a width of 15 to 30 mm (0.59 to 1.18 in) and have three to five slightly prominent main nerves. It blooms between August and September producing golden flowers. The cylindrical flower-spikes are 3 to 5 cm (1.2 to 2.0 in) in length. The scurfy and chartaceous seed pods that form after flowering have a linear shape and are constricted and raised over seeds with a length of 2 to 11 cm (0.79 to 4.33 in) and a width of 2 to 4 mm (0.079 to 0.157 in). The black seeds are arranged longitudinally within the pod. The seeds have an oblong-elliptic shape with a length of 3.5 to 6 mm (0.14 to 0.24 in).

== Taxonomy ==
The species was first formally described in 1978 by the botanist Leslie Pedley as a part of the work A revision of Acacia Mill. in Queensland as published in the journal Austrobaileya. Pedley later reclassified it as Racosperma tenuinerve in 1987 and it was then transferred back to genus Acacia in 2001.

== Distribution ==
It is endemic a few small sized areas of South East Queensland including Glenmorgan, Boondooma and Impey pastoral properties where it is found growing in gravelly ironstone soils as a part of Acacia harpophylla scrub or open Eucalyptus woodland communities.

== See also ==
- List of Acacia species
