= Acacia loroloba =

Ma Ma Creek wattle
- Foliage, near Warwick

Scientific classification
- Kingdom: Plantae
- Clade: Tracheophytes
- Clade: Angiosperms
- Clade: Eudicots
- Clade: Rosids
- Order: Fabales
- Family: Fabaceae
- Subfamily: Caesalpinioideae
- Clade: Mimosoid clade
- Genus: Acacia
- Species: A. loroloba

Binomial name
- Acacia loroloba Tindale
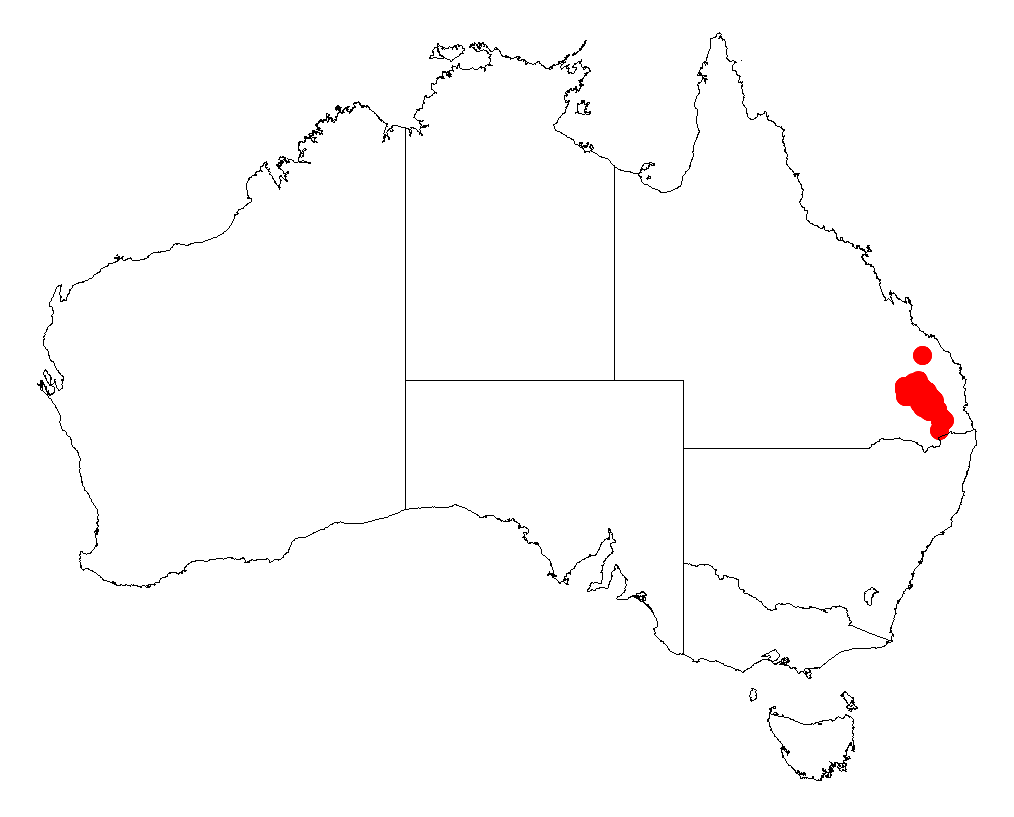
- Occurrence data from AVH

Synonyms
- Racosperma lorolobum Pedley

Species of legume

Acacia loroloba, commonly known as Ma Ma Creek wattle, is a species of flowering plant in the family Fabaceae and is endemic to south-east Queensland, Australia. It is a shrub or tree with smooth bark, ridged branchlets, leathery, dark green, bipinnate leaves with 10 to 18 pairs of pinnae, each with 14 to 35 pairs of pinnules, racemes of spherical heads of pale yellow flowers, and leathery, almost straight-sided pods.

== Description ==
Acacia loroloba is a shrub or tree that typically grows to a height of up to 9 m (30 ft), and has smooth red or green bark, later turning dark brown or grey. The branchlets are ridged when young and covered with soft, velvety hairs, sometimes glabrous. The leaves are leathery and dark green on a rachis 35–80 mm (1.4–3.1 in) long, with 10 to 18 pairs of pinnae 10–35 mm (0.39–1.38 in) long, each with 14 to 35 pairs of oblong to narrowly oblong pinnules 1–2 mm (0.039–0.079 in) long and 0.5–0.7 mm (0.020–0.028 in) long. The leaves are on a petiole on a pulvinus mostly 5–16 mm (0.20–0.63 in) long. There are prominent glands at the base of each pair of pinnae. The flowers are mostly borne in spherical heads in racemes in axils on peduncles 2–5 mm (0.079–0.197 in) long, each head with 19 to 23 pale yellow flowers. Flowering occurs from December to March, and sometimes in July and August after rain. The pods are leathery, almost straight-sided, 60–140 mm (2.4–5.5 in) long, 6–9 mm (0.24–0.35 in) wide and brown, red-brown or black.

== Taxonomy ==
Acacia loroloba was first formally described in 1970 by Mary Tindale in Contributions from the New South Wales National Herbarium from specimens she collected 2 mi (3.2 km) south of Kumbia in 1960.

== Distribution and habitat ==
Ma Ma Creek wattle grows in open forest or woodland in open country, on alluvial flats or black soil plains, in brown clay or red sandy loan or red volcanic soils in Queensland, as far north as Durong, and it is common in the north eastern Darling Downs region, especially in the Haden –Jandowae area and east to the Toowoomba district.

== Conservation status ==
Acacia loroloba is listed as "least concern" under the Queensland Government Nature Conservation Act 1992.

== See also ==
- List of Acacia species
