= Derri Derra =

- Suburb
- Interactive map of Derri Derra
- Coordinates: 25.7052°S 151.2497°E
- Country: Australia
- State: Queensland
- LGA: North Burnett Region
- Location: 19.3 km (12.0 mi) SW of Mundubbera; 52.4 km (32.6 mi) WSW of Gayndah; 200 km (120 mi) SW of Bundaberg; 384 km (239 mi) NW of Brisbane

Government
  - State electorate: Callide
  - Federal division: Flynn

Area
  - Total: 183.2 km^{2} (70.7 sq mi)

Population
  - Total: 115 (2021 census)
  - Density: 0.6277/km^{2} (1.626/sq mi)
- Time zone: UTC+10:00 (AEST)
- Postcode: 4626
Suburbs around Derri Derra
Riverleigh	Boynewood	Glenrae
Dykehead	Derri Derra	Old Cooranga
Brovinia	Beeron	Old Cooranga

Derri Derra is a rural locality in the North Burnett Region, Queensland, Australia. In the 2021 census, Derri Derra had a population of 115 people.

== Geography ==
The Burnett River forms part of the northern boundary. The Auburn River forms most of the western boundary before joining the Burnett in the north-west. The Boyne River forms the eastern boundary and most of the northern before also joining the Burnett.

The Mundubbera-Durong Road (State Route 75) runs through from north to south.

== History ==
Derri Derra Provisional School opened on 7 March 1927. In 1951 it became Derri Derra State School. It closed on 6 August 1971. It was on the north-west corner of the junction of Mundubbera Durong Road and Back Derra Road (25.72314°S 151.21660°E).

Beeron Road Provisional School opened on 5 September 1927. In 1952, it became Beeron Road State School. It closed on 11 December 1987. It was at 1070 Beeron Road (25.7303°S 151.30033°E). The school building is still extant and is used by the Beeron Road Country Club.

== Demographics ==
In the 2016 census, Derri Derra had a population of 146 people.

In the 2021 census, Derri Derra had a population of 115 people.

== Education ==
There are no schools in Derri Derra. The nearest government primary school is Boynewood State School in neighbouring Boynewood to the north. The nearest government secondary schools are Mundubbera State College (to Year 10) in Mundubbera to the north-east, Burnett State College (to Year 12) in Gayndah to the north-east, and Eidsvold State School (to Year 12) in Eidsvold to the north.
