= Brovinia, Queensland =

Brovinia
- Suburb
- Interactive map of Brovinia
- Coordinates: 25.8899°S 151.1483°E
- Country: Australia
- State: Queensland
- LGA: North Burnett Region
- Location: 47.6 km (29.6 mi) SW of Mundubbera; 80.7 km (50.1 mi) SW of Gayndah; 84.2 km (52.3 mi) S of Eidsvold; 214 km (133 mi) WNW of Gympie; 364 km (226 mi) NW of Brisbane

Government
  - State electorate: Callide
  - Federal division: Flynn

Area
  - Total: 591.6 km^{2} (228.4 sq mi)

Population
  - Total: 0 (2021 census)
  - Density: 0.0000/km^{2} (0.0000/sq mi)
- Time zone: UTC+10:00 (AEST)
- Postcode: 4626
Suburbs around Brovinia
Dykehead	Dykehead	Derri Derra
Hawkwood	Brovinia	Beeron
Monogorilby	Boondooma	Boondooma

Brovinia is a rural locality in the North Burnett Region, Queensland, Australia. In the 2021 census, Brovinia had "no people or a very low population".

== Geography ==
The Auburn River forms the northern boundary.

The Mundubbera-Durong Road (State Route 75) runs through from north-east to south.

The Allies Creek State Forest occupies most of the locality, extending south into neighbouring Boondooma. Apart from this protected area, the land use is predominantly grazing on native vegetation.

== History ==
The locality takes its name from a pastoral run established in about 1850. The name was written as Brorinia on maps in 1872 and 1878, but has been written as Brovinia since 1887. A postal receiving office was established in 1888 but closed in 1889.

Brovinia Creek Provisional School opened on 16 July 1945, becoming Brovinia Creek State School in 1951. It closed circa December 1969. It is in a pocket of Brovinia Creek on the north-western corner of Mongorilby Road and Mundubbera-Durong Road, near the old Brovinia homestead (approx 25.9532°S 151.1423°E).

== Demographics ==
In the 2016 census, Brovinia had a population of 10 people.

In the 2021 census, Brovinia had "no people or a very low population".

== Education ==
There are no schools in Brovinia. The nearest government primary schools are Monogorilby State School in neighbouring Monogorilby to the south-west and Boynewood State School in Boynewood to the north-east. The nearest government secondary schools are Mundubbera State College (to Year 10) in Mundubbera to the north-east and Eidsvold State School (to Year 12) in Eidsvold to the north. For some students in Brovinia, these secondary schools might be too distant for a daily commute; the alternatives are distance education and boarding school.
