= Burrandowan Station Homestead =

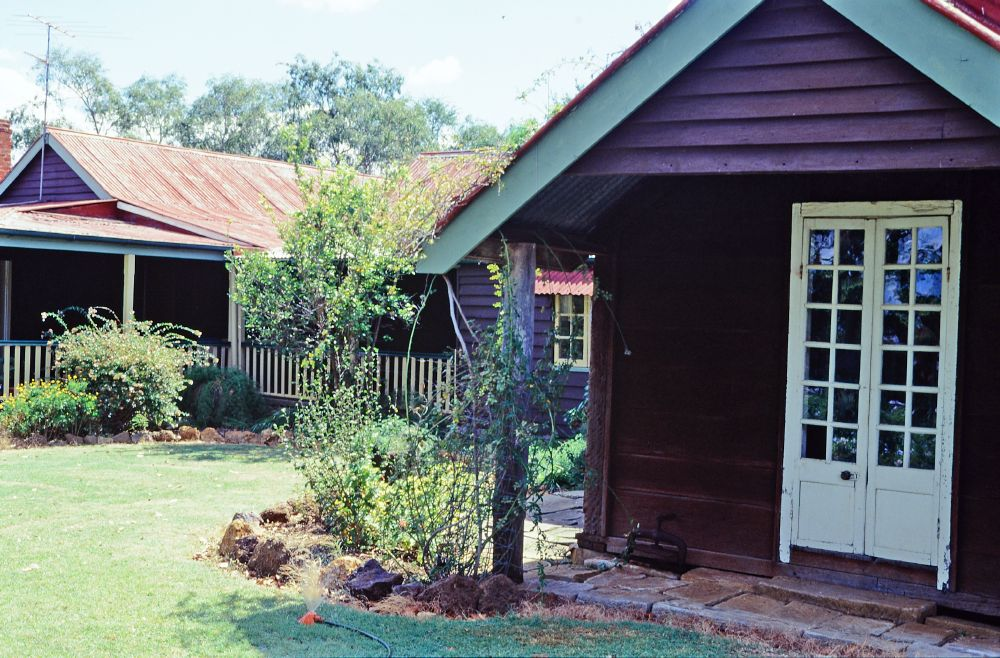
- Burrandowan Station Homestead, 2001

- Location within Queensland Location within Australia
- 26.419°S 151.3282°E
- Location: Kingaroy Road, Durong, South Burnett Region, Queensland, Australia

History
- Design period: 1840s–1860s (mid-19th century)
- Built: 1848–c. 1927

Queensland Heritage Register
- Official name: Burrandowan Station Homestead
- Type: state heritage (built, archaeological, landscape)
- Designated: 21 October 1992
- Reference no.: 600648
- Significant period: 1840s–1860s (historical); 1840s–1860s (fabric)
- Significant components: tennis court, out building/s, grave surrounds/railings, residential accommodation – main house, shed/s, kitchen/kitchen house, dining room, residential accommodation – quarters

Burrandowan Station Homestead is a heritage-listed homestead at Kingaroy Road, Durong, South Burnett Region, Queensland, Australia. It was built from 1848 to c. 1927. It was added to the Queensland Heritage Register on 21 October 1992.

== History ==
Burrandowan was established by Henry Stuart Russell in 1843 and was one of the first pastoral runs to be taken up in the Wide Bay area. The homestead buildings are early vernacular structures associated with the operation of this station. Russell arrived in Australia from England in 1840 and joined relatives in Sydney. These were the Hodgsons who had a property in the Hunter Valley and subsequently established Eton Vale station on the Darling Downs. Russell travelled with them to the Darling Downs and in 1841 took up Cecil Plains station with his brother Sydenham.

Searches for pastoral land extended north in the early 1840s after the Moreton Bay region was opened for selection following the closure of the penal colony. Initial leases were taken up in the Moreton Bay, Darling Downs and Brisbane Valley regions, but by 1842 squatters were looking further north for suitable land. In May 1842, Russell joined an expedition to search the Wide Bay area for grazing country and in November of the same year, with Sydenham and William Glover, made another expedition to the Wide Bay area. They chose land that they named Burrandowan, said to mean "big wind" in the local Aboriginal dialect. This area was outside the area officially designated for pastoral settlement, however, and so the run was not registered. After a second visit to the area, Russell returned to Cecil Plains, leaving Sydenham and Glover in charge and the new run was stocked with sheep from Cecil Plains in May 1843. Relationships with the local Aboriginal people at Burrandowan were, and continued to be, hostile and shepherds were reluctant to work there. Sydenham and Glover soon became dispirited and left, Sydenham being back in England by 1844. Russell returned to manage the property until he sold it to Captain G.S.N. Living in the same year.

In June 1847, Burrandowan was sold to Phillip Friell. In 1848 the Burnett District was officially opened for settlement and tenders for runs were opened. Friell's 1849 application for a lease was accepted in April 1850 and gazetted on 26 July 1851. He made improvements to the property including the surviving buildings, which are thought to have been built around 1848. A homestead was built which included a billiard room and library. Bricks from this homestead remain on the property and are stamped with a heart motif. It is thought that these were made by a local brickmaker, who also made bricks for other stations, including Jimbour, Jondaryan and Boondooma, using a different card suit design for each place.

Friell died in 1854 and the property appears to have been managed by Gordon Sandeman, possibly until it was sold to Robert Campbell in May 1860. In the mid-1850s, Burrandowan was reported to be the largest property in the Burnett district, carrying 65 000 sheep. In 1870 it was sold to Robert Towns and Alexander Stuart trading as Towns and Co., Towns holding a number of other properties at the time. In 1872 the run was acquired by Alexander Campbell and John Hay and in the late 1870s was restocked with cattle. In 1885, it passed to the Mercantile Bank of Sydney, which consolidated the run.

During the 1890s a series of resumptions for grazing leases began on properties in the area to encourage closer settlement following the 1884 land Act. The core section of the run was leased to the Commercial Bank of Australia in 1900 and sold by them in 1901 to Frederick Borton, who was placed at Burrandowan by the 1874 Queensland Post Office Directory and may have been a manager. Borton immediately transferred the property to George Keppel, Gerald, Mark and Roderick Borton. In 1910, land sales were held of resumed Burrandowan land, which sold quickly as a railway to Nanango was anticipated. In 1917, the final sections of resumed land on this and several other runs in the district were allocated for the Soldier Settlement scheme.

Keppel Borton retired and Gerald Borton ran Burrandowan until he died in 1919 when his son managed the property until purchased by a Mr Turner in 1921 and then by Richard Tancred. The current homestead is assembled from three early buildings and is slightly higher and further away from Garden Creek than the previous main house. They are thought to have been assembled in this form around 1927 and comprise the Burrandowan store, part of the homestead and a building relocated from Cooinda, a grazing property formed from Burrandowan land in 1890. Tancred died in 1934 and his widow leased the property to George Lewis who purchased Burrandowan in 1943. The property was subdivided into three sections in 1987 and was purchased in 2001.

== Description ==
The homestead buildings are located in a garden setting without a formal approach drive. They comprise a dwelling in three sections, sheds, a guest cottage, an ant bed tennis court and traces of various other outbuildings just visible above ground.

The main residence consists of three buildings; a kitchen and office, a dining room connected to it by a covered way and a bedroom wing. The kitchen building is set on low timber stumps with logs as bearers. It has a hipped roof clad in corrugated iron sheeting and the walls are constructed of split and trimmed horizontal slabs dropped between uprights. Windows with multiple panes overlook an area paved with dressed stone blocks, some of which are pecked and have tooled margins. This is shaded on the eastern side by an awning of corrugated iron on a pole frame supported by timber posts. The building is unlined but ceiled with fibrous cement sheeting. It has an early closed stove made by the Scottish firm of Smith and Wellstood and a modern kitchen counter. A door opens from the kitchen into an office which is a separate gable roofed building butted against the kitchen and which has a lower floor.

To the west of the kitchen is a passageway with stone paving which leads to the dining room. This is a large rectangular slab building with a gable roof clad in corrugated iron. Verandahs run along both long sides and French windows open onto them. Part of one verandah is used as a servery and part of the other has been enclosed as a bathroom. It has a stone fireplace and a coved ceiling. A wide covered area floored in timber links this to the bedroom wing. This is a gable-roofed rectangular building with three core rooms and is constructed of heavy weatherboards and has French doors. There are now three bedrooms and a sitting room. The verandah area at the rear is enclosed and has a bathroom at one end.

Some distance to the west of the main house is a drop log cottage with a new corrugated iron hipped roof and a bullnosed awning supported by timber posts along the front. This contains a modern kitchen and has a weatherboard extension to the rear.

The other major building is a large, rectangular shed to the east of the house. It has a steep hipped roof clad in corrugated iron and is also constructed of drop log slabs, is unlined and has a pole frame. One end has a small skillion roofed addition and has an earth floor. It is used as a garage. The adjoining section is separated from this by a drop log partition that reaches only to wall height. The building was originally divided into three rooms and a second partition has been removed, though the frame remains. A pole storage rack has been built against one wall and most of the floor in this area is paved with small blocks of timber placed in irregular rows. The shed has large barn doors at one end with forge-made hinges and fixings.

An open shed is situated to the north of the kitchen. It has a hipped corrugated iron roof supported on timber posts. It has some wall sections at the rear that are constructed of slabs.

The homestead grounds contain visible traces of outbuildings, and quantities of the dressed stone blocks of unknown provenance that have been used for paving and low seats around the house and garden. Some bricks also remain from the former homestead although few are whole. There is an ant bed tennis court.

The grave of Jane Warren, wife of Charles Warren, who died in 1903, can be seen about one kilometre to the south of the homestead, although the path that linked them has vanished. It has a headstone and ornamental metal railings. There are believed to be other graves located nearby, although they are not visible due to vegetation growth.

== Heritage listing ==
Burrandowan Station Homestead was listed on the Queensland Heritage Register on 21 October 1992 having satisfied the following criteria.

The place is important in demonstrating the evolution or pattern of Queensland's history.

Henry Stuart Russell took up Burrandowan run following his exploration of the Burnett River District in 1842. It was one of the first pastoral runs in the region and provided an impetus for further settlement. Burrandowan homestead illustrates the pattern of early European exploration and settlement of Queensland where the development of pastoral properties preceded agriculture and the establishment of towns. As an early pastoral property, which has remained in continuous use, Burrandowan has important associations with the development of the pastoral industry in Queensland.

The place has potential to yield information that will contribute to an understanding of Queensland's history.

Burrandowan has the potential to yield information that will contribute to an understanding of Queensland's history through historical and archaeological research. The buildings provide evidence of early building techniques and traces of other early structures remain on site and possibly below ground.

The place is important in demonstrating the principal characteristics of a particular class of cultural places.

Burrandowan homestead complex incorporates structures from the early operation of the station brought together in their current formation in the early 20th century. These include residential and working buildings that are good examples their types and demonstrate the recycling of useful structures commonly made on pastoral properties.

The place is important because of its aesthetic significance.

Burrandowan homestead complex has aesthetic significance, comprising structures that are well made examples of traditional buildings that are pleasing in form, materials and detail.

The place has a special association with the life or work of a particular person, group or organisation of importance in Queensland's history.

Burrandowan homestead has special associations with the life and work of Henry Stuart Russell who took up the run, with Philip Friell who was responsible for the construction of the buildings and with members of the Borton family of whom three generations worked on the property.
