= Toondahra, Queensland =

Toondahra
- Suburb
- Interactive map of Toondahra
- Coordinates: 25.9372°S 151.4275°E
- Country: Australia
- State: Queensland
- LGA: North Burnett Region
- Location: 41.5 km (25.8 mi) SSE of Mundubbera; 54 km (34 mi) SW of Gayndah; 226 km (140 mi) WNW of Gympie; 368 km (229 mi) NW of Brisbane

Government
  - State electorate: Callide
  - Federal division: Flynn

Area
  - Total: 233.6 km^{2} (90.2 sq mi)

Population
  - Total: 0 (2021 census)
  - Density: 0.0000/km^{2} (0.000/sq mi)
- Time zone: UTC+10:00 (AEST)
- Postcode: 4625
Suburbs around Toondahra
Beeron	Old Cooranga	Old Cooranga
Beeron	Toondahra	Wigton
Beeron	Boondooma	Wigton

Toondahra is a rural locality in the North Burnett Region, Queensland, Australia. In the 2021 census, Toondahra had "no people or a very low population".

== Geography ==
The Boyne River enters the locality from the south-east (Boondooma / Wigton) forming the south-eastern, eastern, north-eastern and northern boundaries of the locality, before exiting to the north-west (Beeron / Old Cooanga).

There are a number of mountains in Toondahra (from north to south):

- Pipe Clay Hill (25.8738°S 151.3441°E), 220 metres (720 ft)
- Mount Barbara (25.8900°S 151.4344°E), 290 metres (950 ft)
- Messmate Mountain (25.9697°S 151.3605°E), 432 metres (1,417 ft)
- Mount Lorna (25.9833°S 151.35°E), 390 metres (1,280 ft)

Toondahra State Forest is a small area in the north-west of the locality.

== History ==
The locality was named and bounded on 10 September 1999.

Mount Barbara was named to commemorate the late Mrs Barbara Apel, of the Mimosa pastoral property. She ran her husband's property alone during World War II.

== Demographics ==
In the 2016 census, Toondahra had a population of 8 people.

In the 2021 census, Toondahra had "no people or a very low population".

== Education ==
There are no schools in Toondahra. The nearest government primary school is Boynewood State School in Boynewood to the north-west. The nearest government secondary schools are Mundubbera State College (to Year 10) in Mundubbera to the north-west and Burnett State College (to Year 12) in Gayndah to the north-east. However, students in the south-east of Toondahra may be too distant to attend either of these secondary schools; the alternatives are distance education and boarding school.
