= Cadarga, Queensland =

Cadarga
- Suburb
- Interactive map of Cadarga
- Coordinates: 26.1008°S 151.0330°E
- Country: Australia
- State: Queensland
- LGA: Western Downs Region
- Location: 30.1 km (18.7 mi) WNW of Monogorilby; 83.1 km (51.6 mi) SW of Mundubbera; 182 km (113 mi) N of Dalby; 261 km (162 mi) NW of Toowoomba; 397 km (247 mi) NW of Brisbane

Government
  - State electorate: Callide
  - Federal division: Maranoa

Area
  - Total: 273.3 km^{2} (105.5 sq mi)

Population
  - Total: 28 (2021 census)
  - Density: 0.1025/km^{2} (0.265/sq mi)
- Time zone: UTC+10:00 (AEST)
- Postcode: 4413
Suburbs around Cadarga
Hawkwood	Hawkwood	Monogorilby
Kragra	Cadarga	Boondooma
Durah	Boondooma	Boondooma

Cadarga is a rural locality in the Western Downs Region, Queensland, Australia. In the 2021 census, Cadarga had a population of 28 people.

Cadarga's postcode is 4413.

== Geography ==
The locality is loosely bounded to the south by the Great Dividing Range with the locality being within the North East Coast drainage basin within the catchment of the Burnett River. Cadarga Creek rises in the south-west of the locality and then flows west and then north through the locality, exiting to the north (Hawkwood).

There are two sections of Allies Creek State Forest in the south-west and east of the locality, extending into neighbouring Boondooma. Apart from these protected areas, the land use is predominantly grazing on native vegetation with some production forestry.

== Demographics ==
In the 2016 census, Cadarga had a population of 16 people.

In the 2021 census, Cadarga had a population of 28 people.

== Education ==
There are no schools in Cadarga. The nearest government primary school is Monogorilby State School in neighbouring Monogorilby to the north-east, almost adjacent to the boundary with Cadarga. There are no secondary schools nearby; the alternatives are distance education and boarding school.
