= Old Cooranga, Queensland =

Old Cooranga
- Suburb
- Interactive map of Old Cooranga
- Coordinates: 25.7927°S 151.4011°E
- Country: Australia
- State: Queensland
- LGA: North Burnett Region
- Location: 22.7 km (14.1 mi) S of Mundubbera; 52.1 km (32.4 mi) SW of Gayndah; 201 km (125 mi) W of Maryborough; 388 km (241 mi) NW of Brisbane

Government
  - State electorate: Callide
  - Federal division: Flynn

Area
  - Total: 238.8 km^{2} (92.2 sq mi)

Population
  - Total: 29 (2021 census)
  - Density: 0.1214/km^{2} (0.315/sq mi)
- Time zone: UTC+10:00 (AEST)
- Postcode: 4626
Suburbs around Old Cooranga
Derri Derra	Glenrae	Pile Gully
Beeron	Old Cooranga	Pile Gully
Toondahra	Toondahra	Wigton

Old Cooranga is a rural locality in the North Burnett Region, Queensland, Australia. In the 2021 census, Old Cooranga had a population of 29 people.

== Geography ==
The locality is bounded to the west by the Boyne River while the eastern boundary roughly follows the flow of Coocher Creek. The land along these watercourses is lower (160 metres (520 ft) at the Boyne River) and is used for farming, while the north–south spine of the locality rises to unnamed peaks of 350 metres (1,150 ft).

The east and south-east of the locality is within the Pile Gully State Forest which extends into neighbouring Pile Gully.

The predominant land use is grazing on native vegetation with some irrigated horticulture in the west of the locality near the Boyne River.

== History ==
Cooranga Provisional School opened on 14 August 1922 and closed in March 1923.

== Demographics ==
In the 2016 census, Old Cooranga had a population of 27 people.

In the 2021 census, Old Cooranga had a population of 29 people.

== Education ==
There are no schools in Old Cooranga. The nearest government primary school is Boynewood State School in Boynewood to the north-west. The nearest government secondary schools are Mundubbera State College (to Year 10) in Mundubbera to the north-west and Burnett State College (to Year 12) in Gayndah to the north-east.
