= Coverty, Queensland =

Rural locality in Australia

Coverty
- Suburb
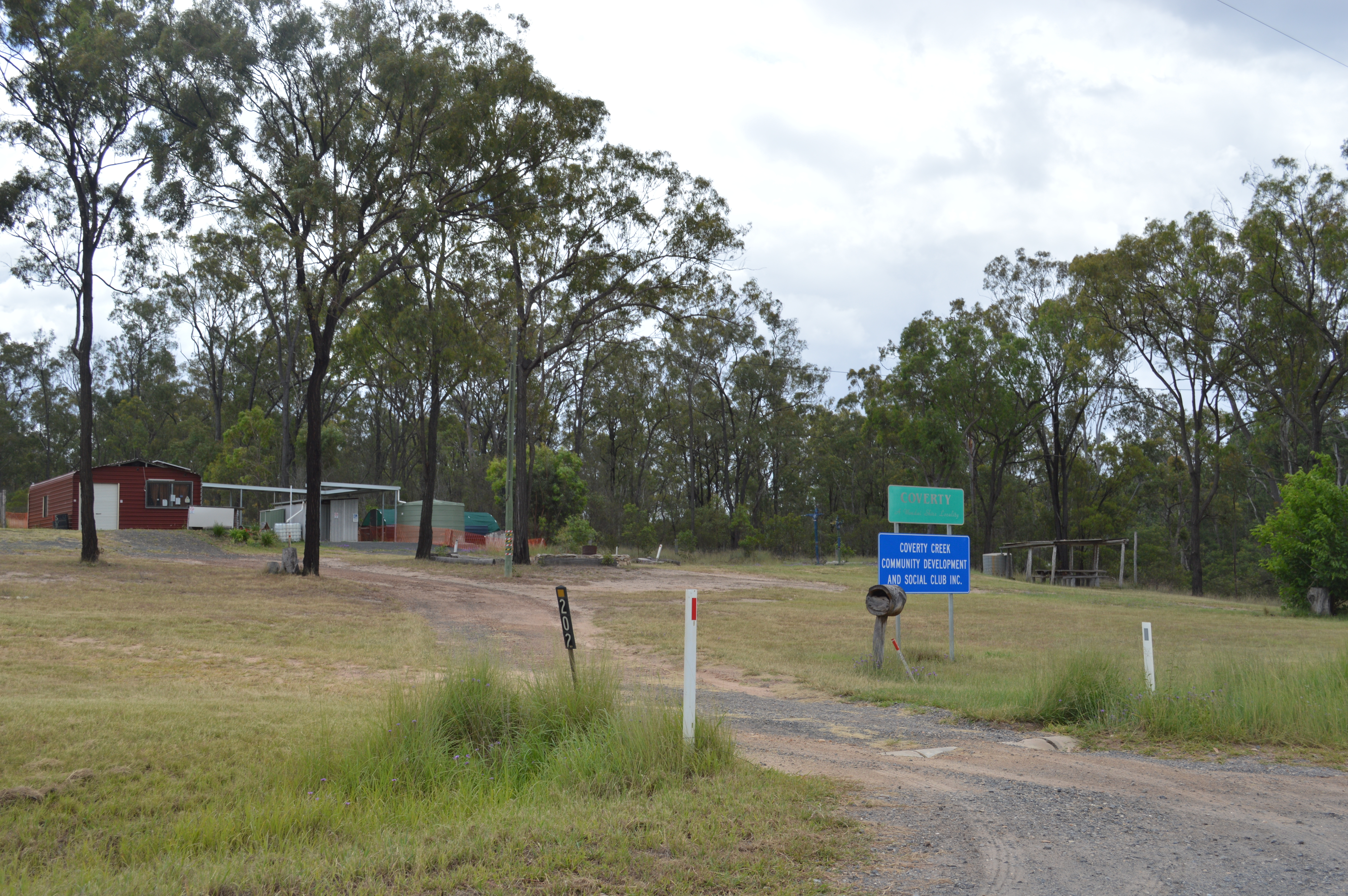
- Coverty Creek Community Development & Social Club, 2017

- Interactive map of Coverty
- Coordinates: 26.2733°S 151.4858°E
- Country: Australia
- State: Queensland
- LGA: South Burnett Region
- Location: 16.8 km (10.4 mi) SW of Proston; 59.2 km (36.8 mi) W of Murgon; 64.4 km (40.0 mi) NW of Kingaroy; 151 km (94 mi) W of Gympie; 286 km (178 mi) NW of Brisbane

Government
  - State electorate: Nanango
  - Federal division: Flynn

Area
  - Total: 88.3 km^{2} (34.1 sq mi)

Population
  - Total: 107 (2021 census)
  - Density: 1.212/km^{2} (3.138/sq mi)
- Time zone: UTC+10:00 (AEST)
- Postcode: 4613
Suburbs around Coverty
Brigooda	Okeden	Okeden
Brigooda	Coverty	Melrose
Durong	Ballogie	Ballogie

Coverty is a rural locality in the South Burnett Region, Queensland, Australia. In the 2021 census, Coverty had a population of 107 people.

== Demographics ==
In the 2016 census, Coverty had a population of 167 people.

In the 2021 census, Coverty had a population of 107 people.

== Education ==
There are no schools in Coverty. The nearest government primary and secondary school (to Year 10) is Proston State School in Proston to the north-east. For secondary education to Year 12, the nearest government secondary schools are Murgon State High School in Murgon to the east and Kingaroy State High School in Kingaroy to the south-east; however, due to the distances, most students in Coverty could not attend these schools and distance education and boarding school would be the alternatives.
