= Boondooma =

- Suburb
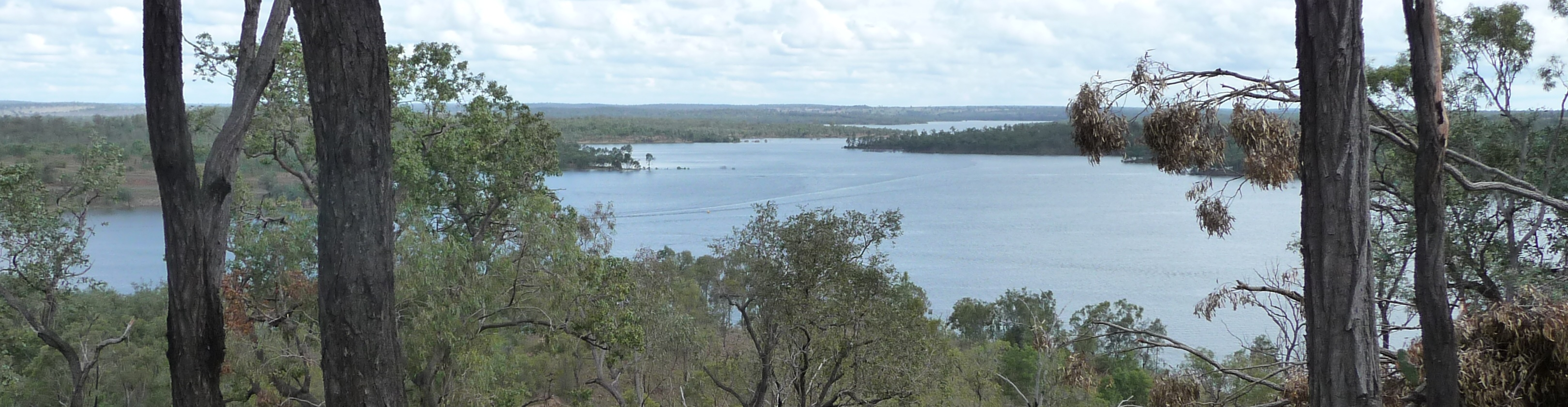
- Boondooma Lake

- Interactive map of Boondooma
- Coordinates: 26.1566°S 151.2177°E
- Country: Australia
- State: Queensland
- LGA: South Burnett Region
- Location: 120 km (75 mi) NW of Kingaroy; 225 km (140 mi) NNW of Toowoomba; 341 km (212 mi) NW of Brisbane

Government
  - State electorate: Nanango
  - Federal division: Flynn

Area
  - Total: 828.3 km^{2} (319.8 sq mi)

Population
  - Total: 70 (2021 census)
  - Density: 0.085/km^{2} (0.219/sq mi)
- Time zone: UTC+10:00 (AEST)
- Postcode: 4613
Suburbs around Boondooma
Monogorilby	Brovinia; Beeron	Toondahra; Wigton
Cadarga	Boondooma	Speedwell; Okeden
Durah; Burra Burri	Durong	Brigooda

Boondooma is a rural locality in the South Burnett Region, Queensland, Australia. In the 2021 census, Boondooma had a population of 70 people.

== Geography ==
The Boondooma Dam and its associated lake is on south-eastern boundary between Boondooma and Okeden (26.0963°S 151.435°E). The Mundubbera-Durong Road runs through from north to south.

== History ==
Durong Provisional School opened on 3 September 1923. On 7 November 1927 it became Durong State School. The school closed briefly in 1928 due to low student numbers.

Boondooma State School opened in 1939 and closed on 3 May 1968. It was on Brownless Road (26.2780°S 151.1846°E).

The closure of Boondooma State School enabled Durong State School to be renamed Boondooma State School in 1970. It closed in December 1999. The school was at 9359 Mundubbera Durong Road (26.2943°S 151.2616°E). It is now the Old Boondooma School Community Centre.

== Demographics ==
In the 2016 census, Boondooma had a population of 76 people.

In the 2021 census, Boondooma had a population of 70 people.

== Heritage listings ==
Boondooma has a number of heritage-listed sites, including:

- Boondooma Homestead: Mundubbera-Durong Road (26.2024°S 151.2932°E)

== Education ==
There are no schools in Boondooma. The nearest government primary schools are Durong South State School in neighbouring Durong to the south and Monogorilby State School in neighbouring Monogorilby to the north-west. The nearest government secondary school is Proston State School (to Year 10) in Proston to the east. There are no nearby schools providing education to Year 12; distance education and boarding schools are the alternatives.

== Attractions ==
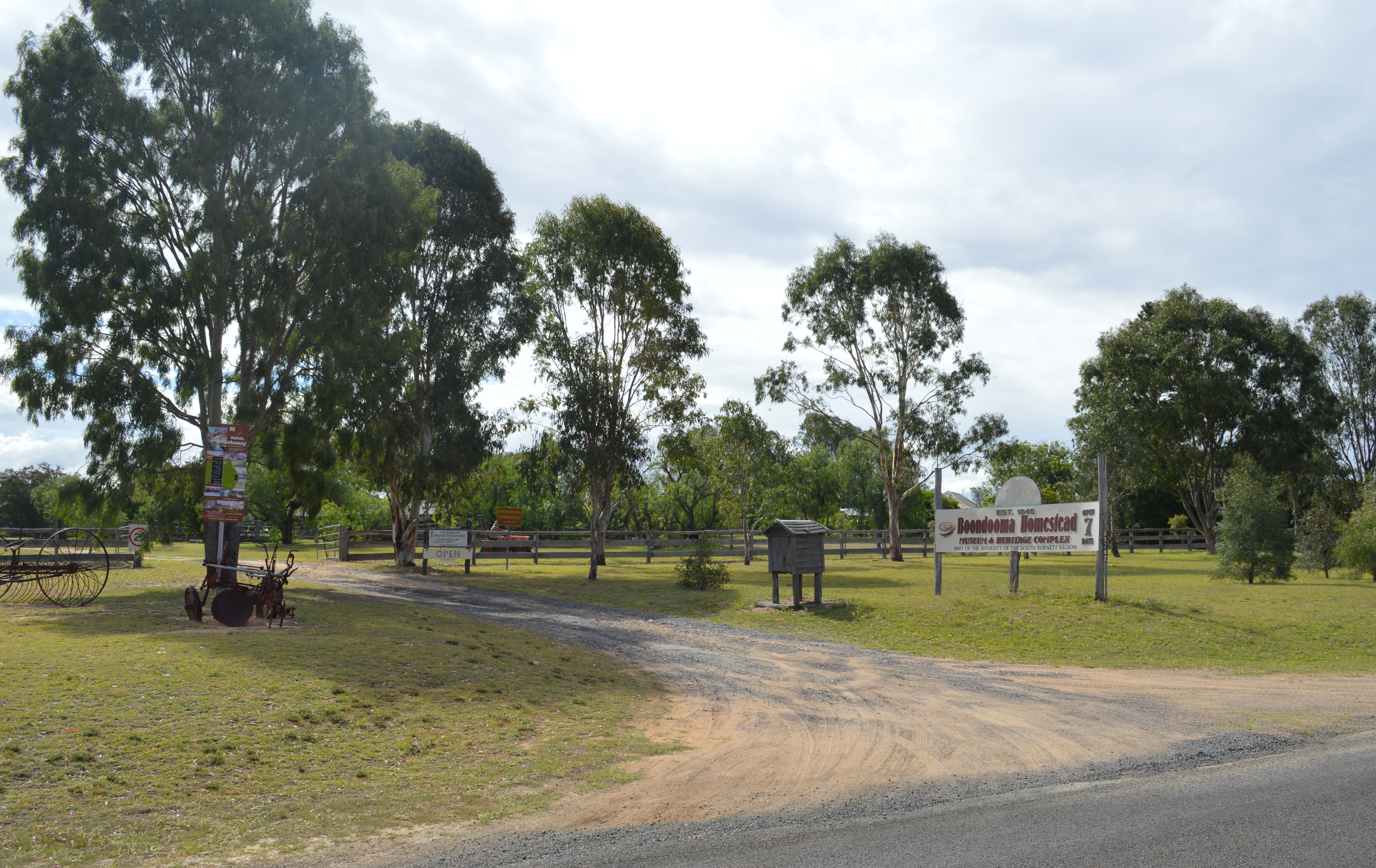
Boondooma Homestead entrance, 2017

Boomdooma Homestead is operated as a museum for both the homestead itself and local history. It is open for self-guided or guided visits. It offers cabin and camping accommodation.
