= Brigooda, Queensland =

Brigooda
- Suburb
- Interactive map of Brigooda
- Coordinates: 26.2233°S 151.3816°E
- Country: Australia
- State: Queensland
- LGA: South Burnett Region
- Location: 28.7 km (17.8 mi) SW of Proston; 74.5 km (46.3 mi) NW of Kingaroy; 174 km (108 mi) W of Gympie; 302 km (188 mi) NW of Brisbane

Government
  - State electorate: Nanango
  - Federal division: Flynn

Area
  - Total: 226.8 km^{2} (87.6 sq mi)

Population
  - Total: 25 (2021 census)
  - Density: 0.1102/km^{2} (0.285/sq mi)
- Time zone: UTC+10:00 (AEST)
- Postcode: 4613
Suburbs around Brigooda
Boondooma	Boondooma	Okeden
Boondooma	Brigooda	Okeden
Durong	Durong	Coverty

Brigooda is a rural locality in the South Burnett Region, Queensland, Australia. In the 2021 census, Brigooda had a population of 25 people.

== Geography ==
The Boyne River forms the western and northern boundaries, with the northern comprising the upper reaches of Lake Boondooma (26.1492°S 151.4132°E), the reservoir behind the Boondooma Dam. The Proston Boondooma Road passes through from east to west.

== History ==
The area was originally known as Lawson, being the name of the parish (26.2166°S 151.3833°E) which was named after pastoralist Alexander Robertson Lawson, who established the Boondooma pastoral run in 1847–1848.

Lawson State School opened on 16 June 1924, but by 1925 it was renamed Brigooda State School. It closed on 24 January 1965. It was at 2473 Proston Boondooma Road (26.2540°S 151.4119°E).

The Brigooda community hall opened in July 1936.

== Demographics ==
In the 2016 census, Brigooda had a population of 36 people.

In the 2021 census, Brigooda had a population of 25 people.

== Education ==
There are no schools in Bigooda. The nearest government primary schools are Durong South State School in neighbouring Durong to the south-west and Proston State School in Proston to the east. The nearest government secondary school is Proston State School which provides secondary education to Year 10. There are no nearby schools offering secondary education to Year 12; the alternatives are distance education and boarding school.
