= Cooinda =

Pastoral lease in Queensland

Coordinates: 21.9154°S 142.86842°E

Location in Queensland

Cooinda Station is a pastoral lease that currently operates as a cattle station in Queensland.

The property is situated approximately 870 kilometres (541 mi) north of Winton and 130 kilometres (81 mi) southeast of Hughenden. The ephemeral Werna Creek runs through the property. The property is predominantly Mitchell and Flinders grass country.

Cooinda was acquired by Balgarnie and Martin at some time prior to 1896. At this time it was running sheep. Over 10,000 sheep were sold off from the property in 1897. In 1898 a bore was being sunk at the property to guarantee water for stock. It was completed in early 1899 when it reached a depth of 3,200 feet (975 m) and produced a flow rate of 1,250,000 imperial gallons (6 ML) per day. Robert Edward Balgarnie still owned the property when he was married in 1906.

The Consolidated Pastoral Company acquired Cooinda in 2010 at which time the property occupied an area of 243 square kilometres (94 sq mi) and runs up to 4,000 head of cattle.

== See also ==
- List of ranches and stations
