= Durong, Queensland =

Durong
- Suburb
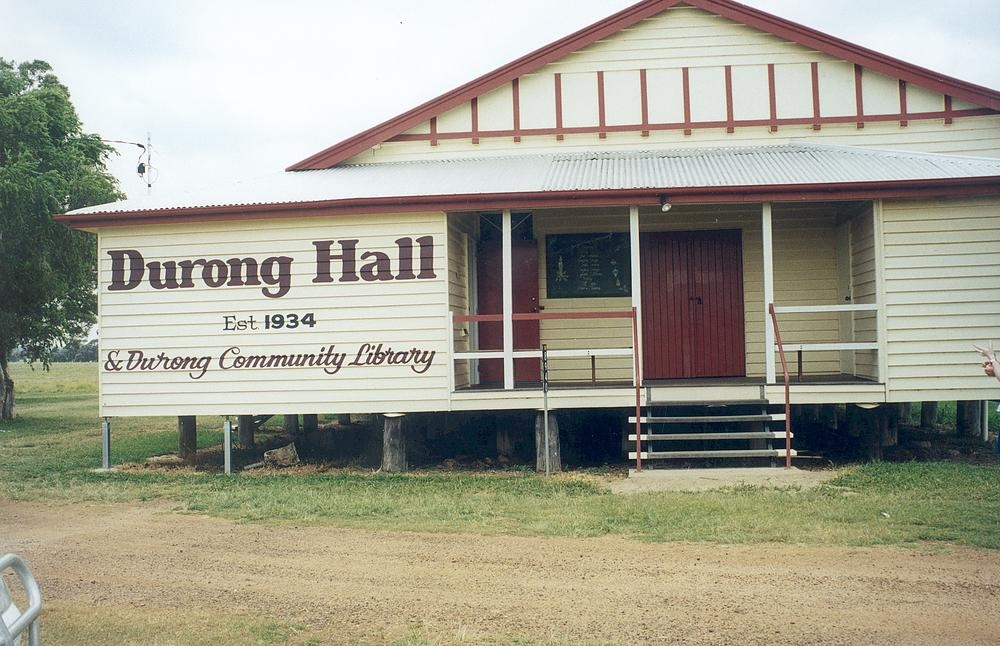
- Durong Hall and Community Library, 2001

- Interactive map of Durong
- Coordinates: 26.3833°S 151.2669°E
- Country: Australia
- State: Queensland
- LGA: South Burnett Region
- Location: 55.2 km (34.3 mi) SW of Proston; 56.7 km (35.2 mi) N of Jandowae; 75.4 km (46.9 mi) WNW of Kingaroy; 188 km (117 mi) NNW of Toowoomba; 291 km (181 mi) NW of Brisbane

Government
  - State electorate: Nanango
  - Federal divisions: Flynn; Maranoa

Area
  - Total: 498.6 km^{2} (192.5 sq mi)

Population
  - Total: 219 (2021 census)
  - Density: 0.4392/km^{2} (1.1376/sq mi)
- Time zone: UTC+10:00 (AEST)
- Postcode: 4610
Suburbs around Durong
Boondooma	Brigooda	Coverty
Burra Burri	Durong	Ballogie
Darr Creek	Chahpingah	Chahpingah

Durong is a rural locality in the South Burnett Region, Queensland, Australia. In the 2021 census, Durong had a population of 219 people.

== Geography ==
The Chinchilla–Wondai Road (State Route 82) passes through from south-west to east, while the Mundubbera–Durong Road (State Route 75) enters from the north and terminates in a T-intersection with State Route 82.

Durong South is a neighbourhood in the centre of the locality (26.3942°S 151.2450°E).

== History ==
Durong Provisional School opened on 3 September 1923. On 7 November 1927, it became Durong State School. In 1928, the school closed briefly because of low enrolment numbers. After the closure of Boondooma State School in 1968, Durong State School was renamed Boondooma State School in 1970; it remained open until December 1999. The school was located at 9359 Mundubbera Durong Road, in neighbouring Boondooma.

Durong South State School opened on 24 May 1925.

The Durong Public Hall opened on Saturday, 14 April 1934. It replaced an earlier building that was about one quarter of its size.

Durong Baptist Church was officially opened over the weekend of 4–5 August 1934 by Alfred Hemsley Richer, President of the Queensland Baptist Union.

Sacred Heart Catholic Church was officially opened on Sunday, 6 March 1966, by Archbishop Patrick O'Donnell. The church was built on land donated by Mr and Mrs Graham Stuart Bond. It closed in 2022. It was at 8960 Chinchilla Wondai Road (26.3959°S 151.2471°E).

The Durong library opened in 1991.

== Demographics ==
In the 2011 census, Durong had a population of 355 people.

In the 2016 census, Durong had a population of 226 people.

In the 2021 census, Durong had a population of 219 people.

== Heritage listings ==
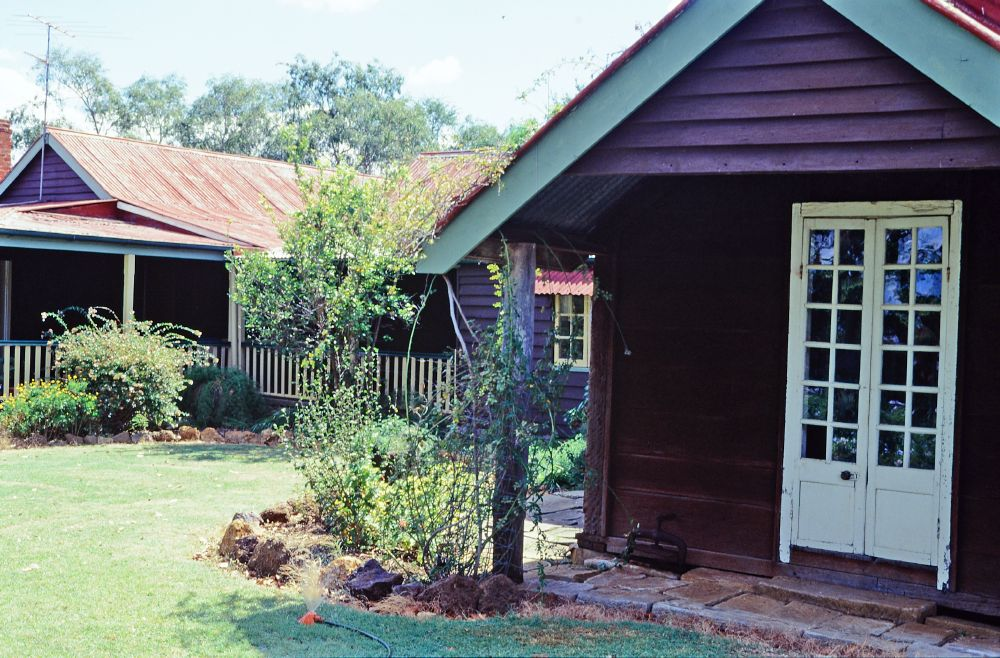
Burrandowan Station Homestead, 2001

Durong has a number of heritage-listed sites, including:

- Burrandowan Station Homestead, Kingaroy Road (26.419°S 151.3282°E)

== Education ==
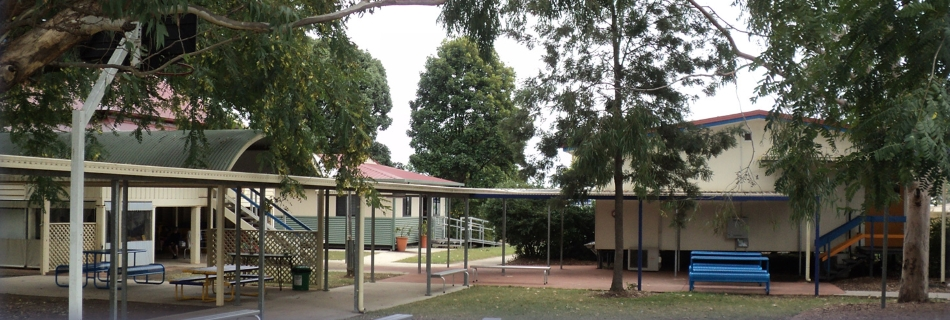
Durong South State School, 2019

Durong South State School is a government primary (Early Childhood to Year 6) school for boys and girls at 10463 Mundubbera Durong Road (26.3923°S 151.2440°E). In 2017, the school had an enrolment of 19 students with 5 teachers (2 full-time equivalent) and 5 non-teaching staff (2 full-time equivalent).

There are no secondary schools in Durong. The nearest government secondary schools are Jandowae State School (to Year 10) in Jandowae to the south and Proston State School in Proston (to Year 10) to the north-east. There are no nearby secondary schools to Year 12; the nearest is Kingaroy State High School in Kingaroy to the south-east. Other options are distance education and boarding schools.

== Amenities ==
Durong Hall is at 8940 Chinchilla Wondai (26.3957°S 151.2452°E). The South Burnett Regional Council operates a public library at the hall.

Holy Trinity Anglican Church is at 8950 Chinchilla Wondai Road (26.3957°S 151.2461°E).

Durong Bowls Club is at 8951 Chinchilla Wondai Road (26.3949°S 151.2462°E).

== Attractions ==
Durong Dingo Sanctuary is a facility that maintains pure bred dingos, keeping them safe from 1080 baiting, trapping, and shooting. It can be visited by the public by appointment.
