= Monogorilby, Queensland =

Monogorilby
- Suburb
- Interactive map of Monogorilby
- Coordinates: 25.9969°S 151.0483°E
- Country: Australia
- State: Queensland
- LGA: North Burnett Region
- Location: 61.7 km (38.3 mi) SW of Mundubbera; 95 km (59 mi) SW of Gayndah; 364 km (226 mi) NW of Brisbane

Government
  - State electorate: Callide
  - Federal division: Flynn

Area
  - Total: 202.1 km^{2} (78.0 sq mi)

Population
  - Total: 33 (2021 census)
  - Density: 0.1633/km^{2} (0.423/sq mi)
- Time zone: UTC+10:00 (AEST)
- Postcode: 4626
Suburbs around Monogorilby
Hawkwood	Brovinia	Brovinia
Hawkwood	Monogorilby	Brovinia
Cadarga	Cadarga	Boondooma

Monogorilby is a locality in the North Burnett Region, Queensland, Australia. The neighbourhood of Allies Creek (26.0667°S 151.1000°E) is located in the south-east of Monogorilby. In the 2021 census, Monogorilby had a population of 33 people.

== History ==
Allies Creek Provisional School opened on 1 November 1935, becoming Allies Creek State School in 1953. It closed on 2 May 1980.

Monogorilby State School opened on 25 August 1936. It was also known as Monogorilby-Cadaga State School.

== Demographics ==
In the 2016 census, Monogorilby had a population of 44 people.

In the 2021 census, Monogorilby had a population of 33 people.

== Education ==
Monogorilby State School is a government primary (Prep-6) school for boys and girls at 2199 Monogorilby Road (26.0548°S 151.0084°E). In 2018, the school had an enrolment of 9 students with 1 teacher and 3 non-teaching staff (1 full-time equivalent). In 2021, the school had an enrolment of 6 students. Since then, the school has been officially open but not operating as it has no enrolments.

There are no secondary schools in Monogorilby. The nearest government secondary school is Mundubbera State College (to Year 10) in Mundubbera to the north-west and Burnett State College (to Year 12) in Gayndah to the north-west. Given the distances involved, distance education and boarding school would be alternatives.
