= Boynewood, Queensland =

Boynewood
- Suburb
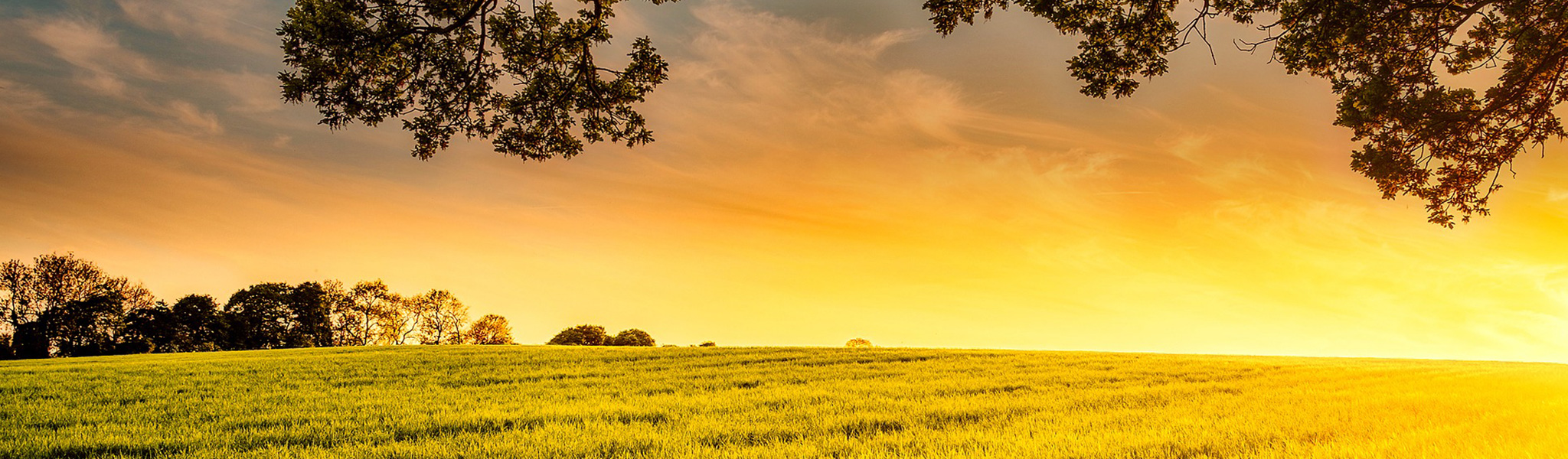
- Boynewood, 2023

- Interactive map of Boynewood
- Coordinates: 25.6358°S 151.2705°E
- Country: Australia
- State: Queensland
- LGA: North Burnett Region
- Location: 38.9 km (24.2 mi) W of Gayndah; 188 km (117 mi) W of Maryborough; 375 km (233 mi) NW of Brisbane

Government
  - State electorate: Callide
  - Federal division: Flynn

Area
  - Total: 57.6 km^{2} (22.2 sq mi)

Population
  - Total: 138 (2021 census)
  - Density: 2.396/km^{2} (6.205/sq mi)
- Time zone: UTC+10:00 (AEST)
- Postcode: 4626
Suburbs around Boynewood
Riverleigh	Mundubbera	Mundubbera
Derri Derra	Boynewood	Glenrae
Derri Derra	Derri Derra	Derri Derra

Boynewood is a rural locality in the North Burnett Region, Queensland, Australia. In the 2021 census, Boynewood had a population of 138 people.

== Geography ==
The locality is bounded to the north by the Burnett River and to the west and south by its tributary the Boyne River.

The Mundubbera-Durong Road (State Route 75) passes through the locality from the north-east (Mundubbera) to the south-west (Derri Derra).

The principal land use is crop farming and orchards.

== History ==
Boynewood State School opened on 2 February 1915 on the northern corner of Dykehead Road and Taylors Road (approx 25.64670°S 151.23639°E). In 1934, the school was relocated to its present site in order to be more centrally located.

All Saints' Anglican church was officially opened on Sunday 9 February 1919 by Archdeacon Arthur Rivers. It closed circa 1989.

== Demographics ==
In the 2016 census, Boynewood had a population of 172 people.

In the 2021 census, Boynewood had a population of 138 people.

== Education ==
Boynewood State School is a government primary (Prep-6) school for boys and girls at 1138 Durong Road (25.6549°S 151.2548°E). In 2017, the school had an enrolment of 29 students with 3 teachers (2 full-time equivalent) and 5 non-teaching staff (2 full-time equivalent).

There are no secondary schools in Boynewood. The nearest government secondary schools are Mundubbera State College (to Year 10) in neighbouring Mundubbera to the north, Burnett State College (to Year 12) in Gayndah to the east, and Eidsvold State School (to Year 12) in Eidsvold to the north-west.
