= Cotton Tree Caravan Park =

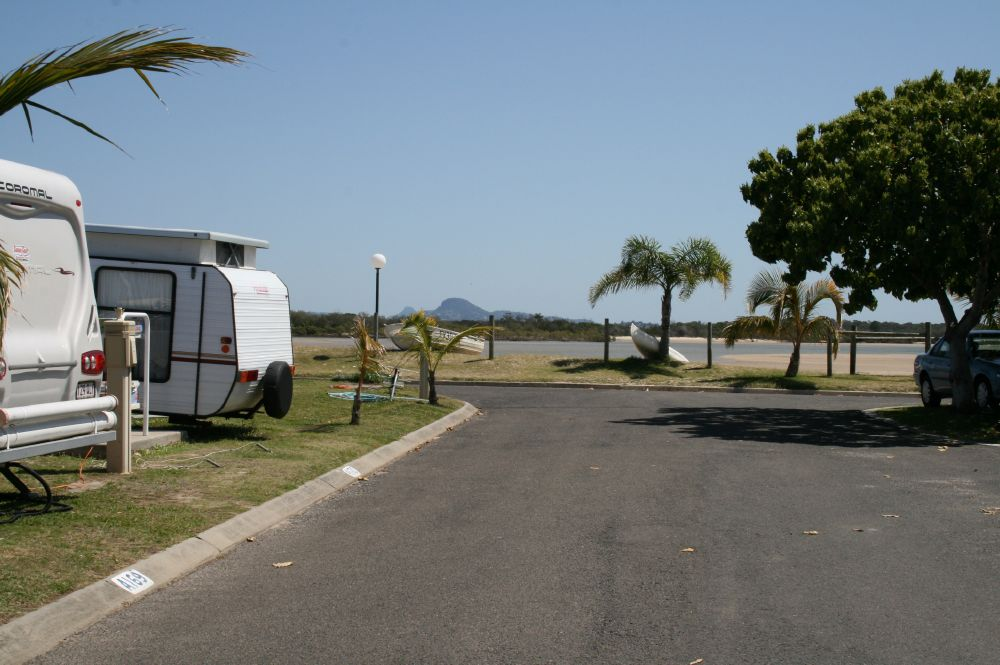
- Cotton Tree Caravan Park, 2009

- Location within Queensland Location within Australia
- 26.6523°S 153.1006°E
- Location: Cotton Tree Parade, Cotton Tree, Sunshine Coast Region, Queensland, Australia

Queensland Heritage Register
- Official name: Cotton Tree Caravan Park
- Type: state heritage (landscape, built)
- Designated: 3 April 2009
- Reference no.: 602707
- Significant period: 1880s–1960s

Cotton Tree Caravan Park is a heritage-listed caravan park at Cotton Tree Parade, Cotton Tree, Sunshine Coast Region, Queensland, Australia. It was added to the Queensland Heritage Register on 3 April 2009.

== History ==
The lower reaches of the Maroochy River began to develop as a place of resort in the 1880s. On the southern bank at its mouth, where Cotton Tree Caravan Park is sited, a 215-acre Wharf and Water reserve was gazetted in 1873. Holiday makers informally camped on the reserve among the native Cotton trees (Hibiscus tiliaceus). The use of the reserve, adjacent to a calm, shallow stretch of the river, reflected the preferences of the Victorian era for seaside swimming, boating and fishing. Similar locations for resort on the North Coast (now known as the Sunshine Coast) developed in the same period at Caloundra and Tewantin.

The Salvation Army established the area as a resort location. A yearly "Maroochy Heads encampment" was organised over the short break between Christmas and the New Year. The encampment provided a range of religious and leisure activities for local settlers and South Sea Islanders working on sugar cane farms at nearby Buderim, with alcohol, gambling and dancing prohibited. The first reported encampment was in 1896, when over 200 people stayed on the reserve. Later advertising by the Salvation Army suggests the encampment may have begun as early as 1888.

The encampment became a popular annual event. Over Christmas 1905, 400 people camped on the reserve. The surf beach immediately south of the river mouth gradually became more popular for swimming and in 1908 a life saving reel was installed. While the resort charms of the Maroochy region gained wider exposure in the 1900s and outside tourists became more common, campers were predominantly from the Blackall Range and districts surrounding Nambour until the interwar period.

By the 1910s, the encampment, advertised as 'Nature's Pick Me Up', had extended to two weeks duration. Tents were available for hire, erected for a small fee. Meals were offered in the dining tent and a large marquee was used for gatherings, while a kiosk operated by the Salvation Army sold bread, soft drinks, lollies and fruit. Two other private kiosks were in operation on the site by 1913. Wells were sunk in the sand to source fresh water and Maroochy Shire Council erected a new jetty and bathing sheds in 1912.

In 1908, the Queensland government included much of the 1873 reserve within its survey of the Township of Maroochydore (which included Cotton Tree). The potential loss of public land attracted strong resistance from campers and the Maroochy Shire Council, and land sales did not proceed immediately. A second attempt in 1914 to sell Maroochydore town lots also met with strong public resistance. On Boxing Day 1914, over 500 people voiced their opposition at a public meeting held on the reserve in the Salvation Army marquee. In early 1915 the new TJ Ryan Labor government announced their intention to proceed with the sales. While objections were lodged with the Lands Department and protestors criticised the 'bartering of people's heritage for money', the government proceeded with auctioning the allotments under perpetual lease from December 1915.

Seventeen remaining acres of the original reserve was re-gazetted for Camping and Recreation in September 1916. This north-easterly portion of the reserve was not submitted for sale because it was considered tidal. Following the land sales, the number of seasonal campers on the reserve appears to have declined, until 1926, when more "canvas houses" than in previous years were noted. The Salvation Army's involvement with the site decreased, replaced by a Methodist mission over summer 1919/20. The last reported Salvation Army encampment took place in 1929, with 100 tents on the reserve.

The Maroochy Shire Council's involvement in managing the Cotton Tree reserve gradually increased during the interwar period. A new jetty was constructed in 1923 and new bathing sheds were constructed in 1929. Sanitation was an important concern for the increasing number of visitors to the site, with Health Inspector's ensuring the wells and cabinets at Cotton Tree were cleaned before holidays. Under its Seaside Improvement Scheme, the council improved access to the reserve during 1940, with camping fees introduced by this time. New camping areas were also established on the beachfront extending south to Mooloolaba. In 1941, the reserve was re-gazetted, with Maroochy Shire Council as trustee.

During the interwar period, coastal resorts to the south and north of Brisbane (today's Gold and Sunshine Coasts) became more reliant on the provision of adequate roads and bridges to attract and deliver the growing amount of motor-driven tourists. Improvements to road networks during this period strongly influenced the development of the tourist industry in the Maroochy area. Until the late 1920s, the Maroochy River was the key transport route to Maroochydore, with most visitors arriving by motor launch at the Cotton Tree jetty, via Nambour railway station and the Moreton Mill tramway. In 1922 the Maroochy Shire Council began work on a road suitable for motor vehicles between Nambour and Maroochydore. By 1927 the route was upgraded to a Main Road, effectively ending the Maroochy River's role as the key transport artery for Maroochydore.

The first section of the Bruce Highway, between what is now Rothwell and Eumundi, was opened in December 1934. For the first time, motor tourists from Brisbane had reliable access to the North Coast, with a trip to Maroochydore taking approximately two hours. The potential for tourism growth at North Coast seaside and mountain resorts had been a key factor in the decision to allocate Main Roads funds to this project, and when first opened, the highway was classified as a "tourist" road.

The Main Roads Annual Report of 1937 commented on the "remarkable" progress of North Coast seaside resorts, particularly Maroochydore and Caloundra, following construction of the highway, and recorded increased traffic on both the highway and connecting roads. A bitumen road between Maroochydore Post Office and Cotton Tree was completed by January 1937.

The improvements to the road network fostered the beginnings of caravan tourism on the North Coast. Caravanning, essentially another version of camping, developed as a result of increased car usage during the interwar period. The earliest versions of caravans were more like motorhomes; cars with bodies modified by their owners to include a rear compartment for sleeping and storage. Australian manufacturers of towed caravans had appeared by the late 1920s, some moving into the industry from building car bodies. Self-built caravans were also popular, with manuals published on their construction and fittings. By 1937, Australian enthusiasts had their own journal and motoring supplements in newspapers were devoting column space to caravans. Caravans were reported alongside tents at Maroochy seaside camping grounds by the end of 1937, with the region's earliest private caravan accommodation, Tooway Park near Caloundra, under construction in the same period. By 1939, 169 caravans were registered in Queensland.

For the affluent motor tourist who holidayed at seaside camping grounds, caravans offered freedom and flexibility, without sacrificing comfort. As a "home away from home", fitted with modern conveniences, caravans were markedly different from the simplicity of camping under a canvas tent. They were an alternative to local hotels and guesthouses, which were in high demand during peak seasons and offered varying levels of quality.

Camping numbers at Cotton Tree steadily increased during the late 1930s, and continued to do so following the end of World War II. Summer 1945/46 attracted record crowds to Maroochy and by summer 1950/51, an additional water well was necessary for campers. Police were stationed on the reserve during holidays and there was a daily attendance of officers from the Maroochy Shire Health Department. A new ranger's office was built in time for Christmas 1953, when an estimated 4000 people camped on the waterfront between Maroochydore and Mooloolaba.

The popularity of caravans became more noticeable by the end of the 1940s with an estimated 12,000 caravans on Australian roads by the end of 1948. In 1949, increasing numbers of caravans were noted on North Coast roads. The RACQ urged local authorities on tourist routes to provide "well equipped camps" to prepare for the boom. Over the 1951/52 season, the number of interstate caravans at Maroochy campgrounds was noted and calls continued for more sites for caravans.

The lifting of petrol rationing by the Menzies Federal government, the increased affordability of cars for the wider population and longer paid holidays were catalysts for the growth of mass motor tourism during the 1950s. In turn, this growth influenced the number of caravan users and the associated development of caravan parks. Queensland's caravan registration figures grew rapidly during the decade from 2320 in 1953, to 5406 in 1961.

In the 1950s relatively few sites in Queensland offered the infrastructure considered desirable for accommodating caravanning needs. Caravan advocates looked to the United States and the United Kingdom for examples of best practice in caravan parks (also known as trailer parks and auto camps). Caravanning guides and journals offered suggestions for layout and features. These involved a more formal arrangement of space than camping, characterised by a grid or circular design and landscaped grounds. Features to consider included a location near a main road, a prominent entrance, recreation room, brick amenities block, levelled concrete slabs, landscaping, hot showers and electricity.

The Maroochy Shire Council played a key role on the Sunshine Coast in developing caravanning facilities. One of its earliest responses was in 1939, when it established a short-lived "auto-camp' in Nambour. In August 1952, the Alexandra Headland Caravan Park was opened by the local State member Mr Frank Nicklin. Mr A.E. Docherty of the Caravan Club of Australia congratulated Maroochy Shire in their "pioneering venture," on what was thought to be the first council sponsored Caravan Park to be officially opened in Australia. This park was closed in 1972.

By 1951, the Maroochy council had allocated 30 sites for caravans at Cotton Tree, although this was a fairly small amount compared to the 450 tent sites on offer. A decade later, attention was being drawn to the poor state of the Cotton Tree campground for growing caravanning needs, as demonstrated by the small number of caravans on-site. The area was still informally laid-out and uneven, with little in the way of clearly marked camp sites or permanent tracks.

Over 1962/63, the Maroochy Shire Council undertook substantial improvements to the site, including the construction of a new amenities block and a more organised east–west grid arrangement of sites for caravans and tents. The scale of the upgrading was recognised in 1964, when Cotton Tree was rated as one of the top "holiday parks" in Australia. More caravans were on-site, coupled with an increase in length of time stayed. In 1966, local division Councillor L. Pierce claimed the Cotton Tree reserve was Maroochy Shire's greatest asset, an acknowledgment of the importance of tourism to the region's economy.

In 1968, there were at least nine council and 20 privately operated caravan parks on the Sunshine Coast. This was a significant increase since 1960, when the Australian Caravan and Touring Manual listed nine in total, marking the decade as a high point for caravan park development on the Sunshine Coast. The Cotton Tree reserve was by this time operating under the name of Cotton Tree Caravan Park. Conveniences included town water, a septic system, washing machines, irons, bottled gas and ice.

By the 1970s, caravanning holidays were a common leisure practice in Australia. A self-contained holiday in a caravan was an annual ritual for many campers, often returning to the same park year after year, members of a holiday community linked by shared experiences of place. After private houses, caravans were the most popular form of holiday accommodation in Australia in 1976. Caravan parks were recognised as significant contributors to local economies in tourist regions, through accommodation fees and flow on effects to other local businesses. By 1978, there were 300 powered sites at Cotton Tree, the largest caravan park on the Sunshine Coast.

The process of periodically updating facilities of caravan parks, while retaining their low scale and relative affordability, is a common feature of their development. In 1975, a major redesign of Cotton Tree Caravan Park was prepared by Maroochy Shire Council's Design Department. The number of sites was reduced to lessen crowding and to provide more individual space, and concrete slabs for caravan annexes and sewerage were installed. Maroochy Shire Council announced further upgrades to the site in 1979, at an estimated cost of $105,000. Among the works were new water, sewerage and power connections to sites, sealing and kerbing of internal roads and additional concrete slabs for caravans. The council intent was to make the site one of an "international standard", that would continue to generate income for the Shire. Photographic evidence reveals that between 1975 and 1985, the internal streets and adjacent sites were realigned on a predominantly north–south orientation.

The position of the Cotton Tree reserve on the mouth of the Maroochy has resulted in fluctuations in its size, and has exposed the site to extreme weather events such as king tides, cyclones and floods. At various times, sand has been deposited and reclaimed at the northern end of the site. When the reserve was re-gazetted in 1941 the area was almost 17 hectares (42 acres), more than double its 1916 size. By 1976 it was approximately 7.44 hectares (18.4 acres), changing again in 1994 to 8.72 hectares (21.5 acres).

During the 1990s, the park was divided into two separate entities, Cotton Tree and Pincushion. Pincushion, at the eastern end of the reserve, was less formally organised than Cotton Tree and mainly catered to campers in tents. The two operations were amalgamated in 2004, with the manager's residence at Pincushion converted into the "beach house" accommodation. The park has continued to update facilities, with a number of cabins, amenities blocks and barbeques built. Near the entrance to the park, "the Cotton Tree", a remnant of the earlier cotton trees on the reserve, remains a landmark feature of the site.

Over the last 25 years, development on the Sunshine Coast has been especially rapid, with the residential population growing at around twice the rate of the State as a whole. The Sunshine Coast is now Queensland's third largest tourist destination in terms of holiday accommodation after the Gold Coast and Cairns. Along the waterfront, a landscape increasingly dominated by medium to high rise buildings, an intensive amount of development has occurred for a range of retail, residential and tourist uses. Against this trend, Cotton Tree Caravan Park has sustained its use as a low scale, relatively affordable option for waterfront tourist accommodation. The park remains a popular destination, especially over traditional holiday periods.

== Description ==
The Cotton Tree Caravan Park occupies a large, flat parcel of land (almost 9 hectares (22 acres)) on the southern bank of the Maroochy River mouth and is bounded to the east by the northern end of Maroochydore Beach; on the south by Cotton Tree Parade and The Esplanade; and to the west by Cotton Tree Park. Highly dynamic in response to prevailing coastal, tidal, cyclonic and flood conditions, the position of the river channel and its associated beach has historically shifted from north to south, most recently breaking through to the south of Pincushion Island in 2002. Efforts to mitigate the negative effects of this cyclical shift are evidenced in a number of sand-filled geo-textile groynes all along the Caravan Park's beach and the placement of two reinforced concrete piers extending from Cotton Tree Park into the estuary. From the northern edge of the Park above the coastal plain there are views of the high-rise development of Maroochydore, the Conservation Parks of the coastal plain, as well as the volcanic features of the Ninderry Range, Mount Coolum, and Mudjimba Island off the coast.

The Park is organised around an arrangement of bitumen streets with curbing and landscaping, unfinished pathways, cabins, caravan lots and camping places; with approximately 400 accommodation sites in differing styles. Accommodation types include: grassed caravan sites or those with a concrete slab (approximately 278), camping sites (approximately 136), cabins (6), and a two-storey beach house. There is a mixture of powered and unpowered caravan and camping sites. Where the grid of streets meets the Maroochy River beach it is more organic in form, while the remaining areas are orthogonal. The camping area occupies a treed area of land in the north-eastern corner of the Park, on a small headland where the Maroochy River meets the ocean and looking out over the beach to Pincushion Island. The cabins are located in two groups of three, one near the end of the entrance road by the river beach and another next to the exit. The beach house is also adjacent to the Park's exit.

Vehicular entrance to the Caravan Park comes off the intersection of King Street, Cotton Tree Parade and The Esplanade and is marked by two stands of mature Cotton trees (Hibiscus tiliaceus): one to the right on a small parcel of the Caravan Park's property and another, containing possibly the site's oldest specimens, occupying the easternmost tip of Cotton Tree Park. Proceeding from this intersection, to the left are an amenity block (No. 1 marked on site diagram below) and the Caravan Park's office and site manager's residence. The street continues toward the river beach before branching out to the right and left. On the left, in the western corner of the Park are located about 14% of the Park's caravan sites. The remainder of the Park's sites are located to the right. Vehicular exit is at the corner of Cotton Tree Parade and Alexandra Parade, approximately 65 metres (213 ft) to the east of the main entrance.

Five amenity blocks are positioned around the site providing ablution and laundry facilities. The earliest of the amenity blocks appears to be No. 2, which is single-storey and dates from the 1962/63 Council renovation of the Park. It has butterfly and skillion roof sections clad in corrugated fibrous cement sheeting and incorporates a palette of materials in its wall construction including brick, painted concrete block and breeze block infill. It is founded on a large concrete slab. There are three BBQ places with shelters provided in the Park, all in the north-eastern corner.

A number of permanent caravan dwellings occupy lots in the Park. These caravans are most often decorated or extended in various ways to facilitate year-round occupation. These embellishments include: small gardens, paving, air-conditioning, verandah and patio additions, a second roof layer built over the top of the caravan to prevent heat gain, and infill materials fixed around the edges to hide under- caravan spaces.

The cabin accommodation provided by the Cotton Tree Caravan Park comprises small, single-storey structures, raised off the ground on steel columns. The vaulted roofs clad in corrugated iron extend over a front verandah. Walls are clad in weatherboards. The beach house is a two-storey building with walls clad in chamfer boards and main hipped roof in corrugated iron.

Other vegetation types on the Caravan Park site include a variety of squat and tall Palm trees (possibly of the Archontophoenix or Dypsis genus, along the river beach and along the western Park boundary), young Norfolk Island pines (toward the Maroochydore Beach end), Cotton Trees (in the camping area and against the ocean beach) Horsetail she-oaks (Casuarina equisetifolia) in the camping area and shielding the Park from the ocean beach, and some mature Paper-barked Tea Trees (Melaleuca quinquenervia, particularly in the area to the north and west of Amenity Block No. 3).

== Heritage listing ==
Cotton Tree Caravan Park was listed on the Queensland Heritage Register on 3 April 2009 having satisfied the following criteria.

The place is important in demonstrating the evolution or pattern of Queensland's history.

Cotton Tree Caravan Park is important in demonstrating the pattern of development of the Sunshine Coast, an historically important region for the development of seaside tourism in Queensland. Originally gazetted as a Wharf and Water reserve in 1873, re-gazetted for Camping and Recreation purposes in 1916, Cotton Tree Caravan Park has sustained its use as a seaside camping ground since the 1880s. It illustrates the policy and practice by early Queensland governments of reserving Crown land for public purposes in prime waterside areas, which was common, but is now rarely practiced.

Cotton Tree Caravan Park is important in demonstrating the evolution of tourist accommodation on the Sunshine Coast, an historically important region for the development of caravan parks in Queensland. The Park's reconfiguration in 1962/63 during the boom period for caravanning (late 1950s and 1960s) and subsequent periodic updates to its basic facilities, were a response intrinsically linked to the rise of mass motoring Australia-wide in the second half of the 20th century.

The place is important in demonstrating the principal characteristics of a particular class of cultural places.

Cotton Tree Caravan Park is important in illustrating the essential characteristics of an early seaside reserve used for recreational camping, a land use and custom that has made a strong contribution to the development of seaside tourism in Queensland. The Park's setting, adjacent to the mouth of the Maroochy River is a location typical for 19th century seaside camping grounds and demonstrates the preference at the time for still water bathing and recreation.

Cotton Tree Caravan Park demonstrates the principal characteristics of a seaside caravan park. On a prime waterfront location, with immediate access to both still water and surf, the place offers opportunities to interact with, and appreciate the natural beauty of its setting. Easily accessed by motor vehicles, and organised around a simple grid of streets and landscaping, the Park offers a range of accommodation types, which are served by a range of facilities that include ablution blocks, barbeques and picnic areas. The range of accommodation and amenities has evolved over time to meet the changing needs of its clientele, while remaining low-scale and relatively affordable for holidaymakers.
