= Kiels Mountain, Queensland =

Kiels Mountain
- Suburb
- Interactive map of Kiels Mountain
- Coordinates: 26.6583°S 153.0002°E
- Country: Australia
- State: Queensland
- City: Sunshine Coast
- LGA: Sunshine Coast Region
- Location: 9.2 km (5.7 mi) SE of Nambour; 10.4 km (6.5 mi) W of Maroochydore; 29.6 km (18.4 mi) NW of Caloundra; 101 km (63 mi) N of Brisbane

Government
  - State electorate: Ninderry
  - Federal division: Fairfax

Area
  - Total: 4.6 km^{2} (1.8 sq mi)

Population
  - Total: 714 (2021 census)
  - Density: 155.2/km^{2} (402/sq mi)
- Time zone: UTC+10:00 (AEST)
- Postcode: 4559
Suburbs around Kiels Mountain
Woombye	Diddillibah	Diddillibah
Woombye	Kiels Mountain	Diddillibah
Woombye	Forest Glen	Forest Glen

Kiels Mountain is a rural locality in the Sunshine Coast Region, Queensland, Australia. In the 2021 census, Kiels Mountain had a population of 714 people.

== Geography ==
The Bruce Highway defines the western boundary of the locality. The mountain of the same name is central to the locality (26.657°S 153.006°E) and rises to 153 metres (502 ft).

Eudlo Creek passes through the southeast tip of Kiels Mountain. Numerous creeks form on the slopes of the mountain, all of which are eventually tributaries of the Maroochy River.

The land use is principally rural residential.

== History ==
The mountain is named after Heinrich "Henry" August Keil, who selected on the eastern slopes in 1880. He was the first settler at Diddillibah, on the north side of Kiels Mountain in 1869. Henry Keil was born 13 July 1838 in Frankenberg, Hesse, Germany, the eldest son of Heinrich Andreas Keil and Anna Katherina Schwaner. He immigrated to Queensland, arriving in Brisbane 28 March 1857 on 'SS Helene'.

Henry Keil and his wife Elizabeth were prominent Salvationists during the early growth of the Salvation Army on the Sunshine Coast, and were known for their charity to the local Aborigines.

Kiel's Mountain State School opened on 23 September 1918 and closed on 15 April 1962. It was at 349-355 Diddillibah Road (north-west corner of Preston Road, 26.6471°S 152.9967°E); it is now within the locality boundaries of Diddillibah.

The spelling was Anglicised from Keils to Kiels Mountain c1930.

On 7 December 2003, 13-year-old Daniel Morcombe disappeared while waiting for a bus on Nambour-Connection Rd (Old Bruce Highway), near the Kiel Mountain Road overpass at Woombye. An arrest was made in August 2011 in connection with his death. His remains were discovered near the Glass House Mountains.

== Demographics ==
In the 2011 census, Kiels Mountain had a population of 657 people.

In the 2016 census, Kiels Mountain had a population of 664 people.

In the 2021 census, Kiels Mountain had a population of 714 people.

== Spiritual retreat ==
Avatar's Abode is a 99-acre (40 ha) spiritual retreat dedicated to Meher Baba (1894–1969) who stayed there in 1958. Avatar's Abode is the oldest and longest-running eastern retreat in Queensland. It is at 48 Meher Road at the summit of Kiels Mountain (26.6564°S 153.0048°E).

== Education ==
There are no schools in Kiels Mountain. The nearest government primary schools are Woombye State School in neighbouring Woombye to the west and Kuluin State School in Kuluin (to the east). The nearest government secondary schools are Nambour State College in Nambour to the north-west and Maroochydore State High School in Maroochydore to the east.

== Amenities ==
There are a number of parks in the locality, including:

- Brookfield Court Bushland Conservation Reserve (26.6508°S 152.9984°E)
- Bushbird Court Bushland Conservation Reserve (26.6461°S 153.0031°E)
- Glenfinnan Bushland Conservation Reserve (26.6676°S 153.0051°E)
- Kaalba Court Natural Amenity Reserve (26.6561°S 152.9976°E)
- Kentish Road Reserve (26.6572°S 152.9941°E)
- Kiel Mountain Bushland Conservation Reserve (26.6495°S 153.0163°E)
- Merimist Way Bushland Conservation Reserve (26.6531°S 153.0064°E)
