= Rosemount, Queensland =

Rosemount
- Suburb
- Interactive map of Rosemount
- Coordinates: 26.6233°S 153.0011°E
- Country: Australia
- State: Queensland
- City: Sunshine Coast
- LGA: Sunshine Coast Region
- Location: 4.8 km (3.0 mi) E of Nambour; 11.2 km (7.0 mi) WNW of Maroochydore; 31.1 km (19.3 mi) NNW of Caloundra; 119 km (74 mi) N of Brisbane

Government
  - State electorates: Ninderry; Nicklin
  - Federal division: Fairfax

Area
  - Total: 13.0 km^{2} (5.0 sq mi)

Population
  - Total: 1,851 (2021 census)
  - Density: 142.4/km^{2} (368.8/sq mi)
- Time zone: UTC+10:00 (AEST)
- Postcode: 4560
Suburbs around Rosemount
Nambour	Bli Bli	Bli Bli
Nambour	Rosemount	Bli Bli
Woombye	Diddillibah	Diddillibah

Rosemount is a rural locality in the Sunshine Coast Region, Queensland, Australia. In the 2021 census, Rosemount had a population of 1,851 people.

== Geography ==
Rosemount is located immediately east of Nambour, bordered on its north, east and south by the Petrie and Paynter Creeks. It extends from west of the Bruce Highway to Bli Bli, about 6 km (3.7 mi) east.

Upper Rosemount Road roughly follows the ridge of the Rosemount Spur, which is a watershed for both the creeks. 'Rosemount' was an early cane farm on Petrie Creek. Rosemount covers an area of about 1,160 hectares (2,900 acres). Rosemount varies in elevation up to 130 m (430 ft) above sea level.

As Rosemount is positioned between the major urban centres of Nambour and Maroochydore it has attracted some highly priced rural and residential developments. Most, however, are in a more modest range.

== History ==
In the 1880s, farm selections were taken up, almost all for cane-growing.

Rosemount Provisional opened on 7 April 1886. On 1 January 1909, it became Rosemount State School. It closed on 16 September 1946. It was on the southern side of Upper Rosemount Road (approx 26.62824°S 152.99589°E).

== Demographics ==
In the 2016 census, Rosemount had a population of 1,585 people.

In the 2021 census, Rosemount had a population of 1,851 people.

== Education ==
There are no schools in Rosemount. The nearest government primary schools are the junior campus of Nambour State College in neighbouring Nambour to the west and Bli Bli State School in neighbouring Bli Bli to the east. The nearest government secondary schools are the senior campus of Nambour State College in Nambour and Maroochydore State High School in Maroochydore to the south-east.
