= Kunda Park, Queensland =

Kunda Park
- Suburb
- Interactive map of Kunda Park
- Coordinates: 26.6653°S 153.0344°E
- Country: Australia
- State: Queensland
- City: Buderim
- LGA: Sunshine Coast Region
- Location: 5.0 km (3.1 mi) NW of Buderim; 5.5 km (3.4 mi) W of Maroochydore; 11.1 km (6.9 mi) SE of Nambour; 23.8 km (14.8 mi) NW of Caloundra; 112 km (70 mi) N of Brisbane

Government
  - State electorate: Ninderry
  - Federal division: Fairfax

Area
  - Total: 2.9 km^{2} (1.1 sq mi)

Population
  - Total: 22 (2021 census)
  - Density: 7.59/km^{2} (19.6/sq mi)
- Time zone: UTC+10:00 (AEST)
- Postcode: 4556
- County: Canning
- Parish: Mooloolah
Suburbs around Kunda Park
| Diddillibah | Diddillibah | Diddillibah |
| Diddillibah | Kunda Park | Kuluin |
| Forest Glen | Buderim | Buderim |

Kunda Park is an industrial suburb of Buderim in the Sunshine Coast Region, Queensland, Australia. In the 2021 census, Kunda Park had a population of 22 people.

== Geography ==
The northern boundary of Kunda Park follows Eudlo Creek, a tributary of the South Maroochy River. In the north-west Eudlo Creek Conservation Park preserves a large section of uncleared land along Eudlo Creek. There is a small area of grazing land near the conservation park. Apart from that, the suburb is industrial.

== History ==
The area was formerly known locally as Crete. The township of Kunda Park was named by the Queensland Place Names Board on 1 May 1975. The name Kunda is believed to be the Kabi language word gunda or konda, meaning cabbage tree palm.

== Demographics ==
In the 2016 census, Kunda Park had a population of 27 people.

In the 2021 census, Kunda Park had a population of 22 people.

== Education ==
There are no schools in Kunda Park. The nearest government primary school is Kuluin State School in neighbouring Kuluin to the east. The nearest government secondary school is Maroochydore State High School in Maroochydore to the east.

== Amenities ==
Maroochydore Regional Football Complex (also known as Martins Creek Soccer Ground) is at 462 Maroochydore Road (26.6600°S 153.0472°E).

There are a number of parks in the suburb:

- Dungannon Court Bushland Conservation Reserve (26.6684°S 153.0340°E)
- Enterprise St Park (26.6709°S 153.0308°E)
- Enterprise Street Bushland Conservation Reserve (26.6702°S 153.0290°E)
- Page Street Park (26.6606°S 153.0339°E)
- Secret Valley Bushland Conservation Reserve (26.6728°S 153.0341°E)

Maroochydore Fire and Emergency Services is at 2 Enterprise Street (26.6645°S 153.0298°E).
