= Giaura tortricoides =

Scientific classification
- Kingdom: Animalia
- Phylum: Arthropoda
- Class: Insecta
- Order: Lepidoptera
- Superfamily: Noctuoidea
- Family: Nolidae
- Genus: Giaura
- Species: G. tortricoides

Binomial name
- Giaura tortricoides (Walker, 1865)

Synonyms
- Orosa tortricoides Walker, 1865 [1866]; Subrita? basigerella Walker, 1866; Sarrothripa curvilinea Snellen, 1879; Giaura tortricoides ab. borneonis Strand, 1917; Giaura tortricoides ab. ura Strand, 1917; Giaura tortricoides borneonis Gaede and ura Gaede, 1937

Species of moth

Giaura tortricoides is a moth of the family Nolidae first described by Francis Walker in 1865. It is found in Sri Lanka, Japan, Andaman Islands, Borneo, Sumatra, Flores, Sulawesi, New Guinea, Bismarck Islands and Australia.

== Description ==
Adult wingspan is 9–10 millimetres (0.35–0.39 in). Forewings dark brown. Some specimen with sub-dorsal longitudinal dark bar. Tymbal organs are absent. Larval food plant is Hibiscus tiliaceus. Caterpillar is smooth slightly spindle shaped and green. Head is black. Pupation occurs in a cocoon. Cocoon is pale grayish white and boat shaped.
