= Maroochydore (disambiguation) =

Maroochydore is an urban centre in the central Sunshine Coast region of Queensland, Australia.

Maroochydore may also refer to:

- Maroochydore (suburb), its central business district
- Electoral district of Maroochydore, an electoral district of the Legislative Assembly of Queensland
