= Diddillibah, Queensland =

Diddillibah
- Suburb
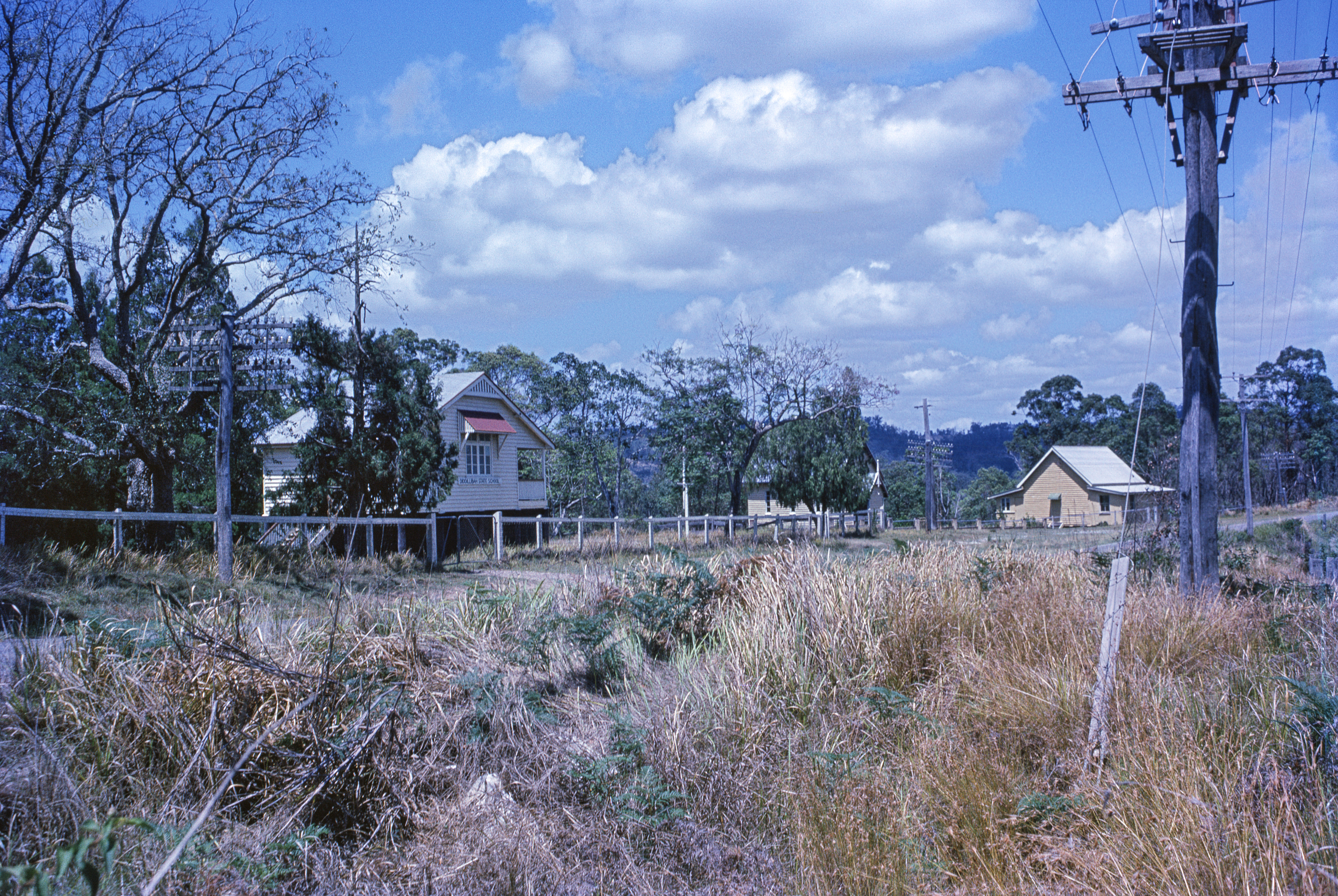
- Diddillibah, 1962: L to R: school, Methodist church, and community hall

- Interactive map of Diddillibah
- Coordinates: 26.6483°S 153.0261°E
- Country: Australia
- State: Queensland
- LGA: Sunshine Coast Region
- Location: 7.4 km (4.6 mi) W of Maroochydore; 11.4 km (7.1 mi) E of Nambour; 27.2 km (16.9 mi) NNW of Caloundra; 102 km (63 mi) N of Brisbane

Government
  - State electorate: Ninderry
  - Federal division: Fairfax

Area
  - Total: 11.0 km^{2} (4.2 sq mi)

Population
  - Total: 1,703 (2021 census)
  - Density: 154.8/km^{2} (401.0/sq mi)
- Time zone: UTC+10:00 (AEST)
- Postcode: 4559
Suburbs around Diddillibah
Rosemount	Rosemount	Bli Bli
Woombye	Diddillibah	Maroochydore
Kiels Mountain	Forest Glen	Kuluin; Kunda Park

Diddillibah is a semi-rural locality in the Sunshine Coast Region, Queensland, Australia. In the 2021 census, Diddillibah had a population of 1,703 people.

== History ==
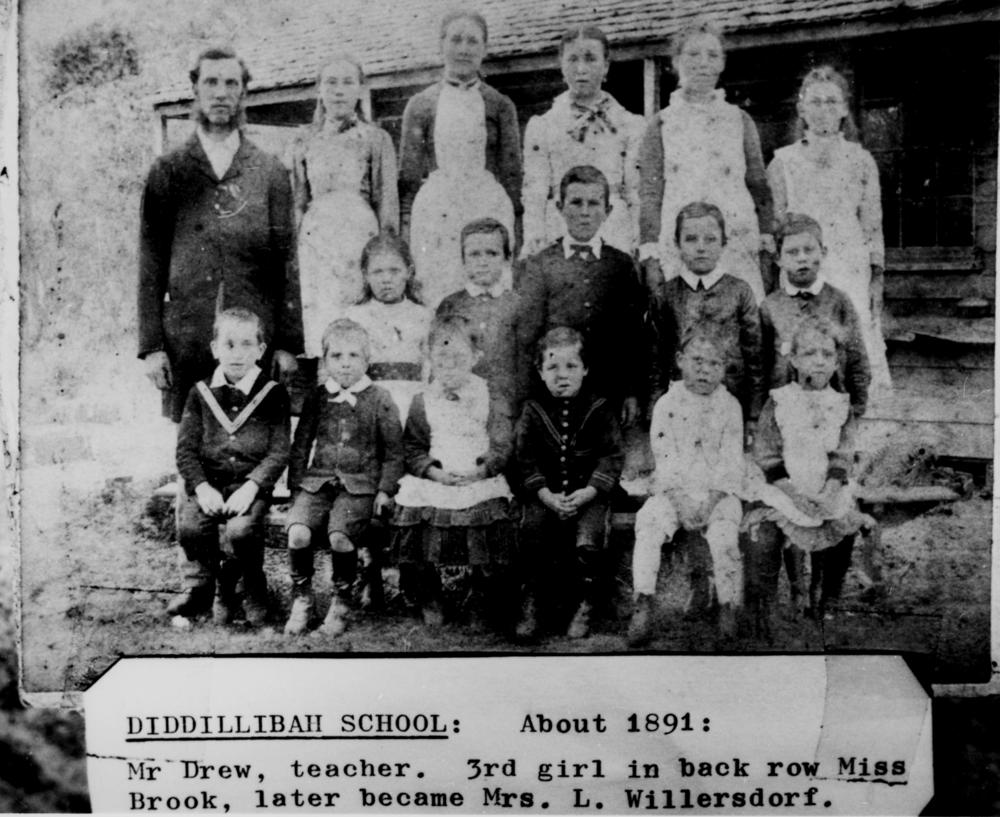
Students at Diddillibah Provisional School, circa 1891

Its name comes from a local Aboriginal word dhilla, which means "coarse grass" or "carpet snake" and ba, which means "place". Also known as the "valley of the snakes".

Diddillibah Provisional School opened on 14 September 1885. The school building was built by local people led by Richard Heddon. On 1 January 1909, it became Diddillibah State School on 1 January 1909 and the building was given to the Queensland Government. In December 1937, a new school building was officially opened by the local member of parliament Frank Nicklin. The school closed on 14 May 1962. It was located at 664-668 Diddillabah Road (26.6472°S 153.0249°E). It is now Ash Road Park.

Diddillibah Methodist Church opened circa August 1901. It was at 660 Diddillibah Road (26.6473°S 153.0245°E). In 1968, the church building was relocated to Coolum Beach.

Diddillibah Community Hall was officially opened on Friday 2 June 1938 by Frank Nicklin. It is the original school building which became available after the new school was built. It was relocated 100 yards (91 m) west of the school onto its present site and extended using volunteer labour.

== Demographics ==
In the 2016 census, Diddillibah had a population of 1,403 people.

In the 2021 census, Diddillibah had a population of 1,703 people.

== Education ==
There are no schools in Diddillibah. The nearest government primary schools are Woombye State School in neighbouring Woombye to the west, Bli Bli State School in neighbouring Bli Bli to the north-east, and Kuluin State School in neighbouring Kuluin to the south-east. The nearest government secondary schools are Maroochydore State High School in neighbouring Maroochydore to the east and Nambour State College in Nambour to the north-west.

== Facilities ==
Diddilibah Cemetery is off Ash Road (26.6483°S 153.0247°E).

Kiel Mountain Rural Fire Station is at 670 Diddillibah Road (26.6472°S 153.0254°E).

== Amenities ==
Diddillibah Community Hall is at 658 Diddillibah Road (26.6472°S 153.02423°E).

There are a number of parks in the area:

- Ash Road Bushland Conservation Reserve (26.6478°S 153.0250°E)
- Ash Road Park (26.6473°S 153.0249°E)
- Barry Murridge Memorial Garden (26.6349°S 153.0384°E)
- Brookfield Court Bushland Conservation Reserve (26.6508°S 152.9984°E)
- Bushbird Court Bushland Conservation Reserve (26.6461°S 153.0031°E)
- Campbell Road Natural Amenity Reserve (26.6397°S 153.0486°E)
- Diddillibah Road Environmental Reserve (26.6442°S 153.0335°E)
- Diddillibah Road Natural Amenity (26.6504°S 152.9921°E)
- Diddillibah Road Park (26.6477°S 153.0239°E)
- Melcar Court Bushland Conservation Reserve (26.6513°S 153.0334°E)
- River Gum Drive Bushland Conservation Reserve (26.6502°S 153.0408°E)
- Rose Marie Drive Natural Amenity Reserve (26.6451°S 153.0008°E)
- Schottiana Rainforest Park (26.6375°S 153.0034°E)
