= Maroochydore (suburb) =

- Suburb
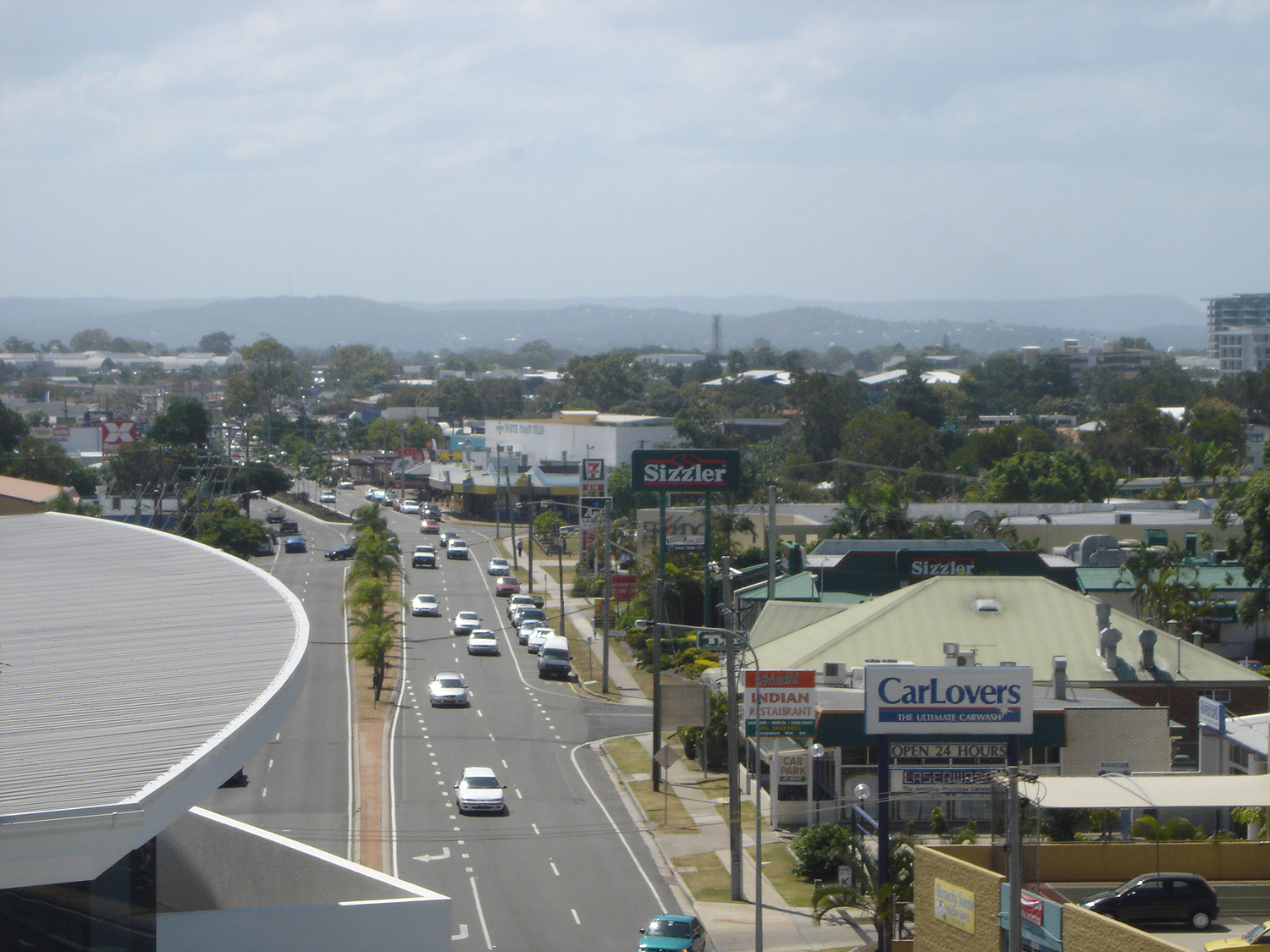
- Aerodrome Road, 2006

- Interactive map of Maroochydore
- Coordinates: 26.6567°S 153.0844°E
- Country: Australia
- State: Queensland
- City: Maroochydore
- LGA: Sunshine Coast Region
- Location: 15.7 km (9.8 mi) ESE of Nambour; 22.9 km (14.2 mi) N of Caloundra; 81.5 km (50.6 mi) SE of Gympie; 104 km (65 mi) N of Brisbane

Government
  - State electorate: Maroochydore
  - Federal division: Fairfax

Area
  - Total: 12.6 km^{2} (4.9 sq mi)
- Elevation: 7 m (23 ft)

Population
  - Total: 20,629 (2021 census)
  - Density: 1,637/km^{2} (4,240/sq mi)
- Time zone: UTC+10:00 (AEST)
- Postcode: 4558
- Mean max temp: 25.1 °C (77.2 °F)
- Mean min temp: 15.8 °C (60.4 °F)
- Annual rainfall: 1,310.6 mm (51.60 in)
Suburbs around Maroochydore
Bli Bli; Pacific Paradise	Twin Waters	Coral Sea
Diddillibah; Kuluin	Maroochydore	Coral Sea
Buderim	Alexandra Headland	Coral Sea

Maroochydore is a coastal suburb of the Sunshine Coast, Queensland, Australia, and is the central suburb and central business district of the Maroochydore urban centre. In the 2021 census, the suburb of Maroochydore had a population of 20,629 people.

Maroochydore contains a popular surf beach. The Maroochy River's southern bank forms a virtually unbroken stretch of parkland and picnic spots in the area known as Cotton Tree. An oceanway encourages sustainable travel by pedestrians and cyclists along the beaches.

Maroochydore is also a major commercial area of the Sunshine Coast with most shopping precincts located in the central business district. It is home to the Sunshine Plaza shopping centre. The Sunshine Coast's major bus interchange for Translink services operated by Kinetic Sunshine Coast is in Maroochydore.

== History ==
Maroochydore Post Office opened on 4 October 1922 (a receiving office had been open from 1891 until 1898, and from 1916).

Maroochydore Provisional School opened on 25 August 1921. On 1 September 1924, it became Maroochydore State School.

Our Lady Star of the Sea (Stella Maris) Catholic Church was officially opened by Archbishop James Duhig on Sunday 15 October 1950. It replaced an earlier church which had become inadequate for the growing congregation. The 1950 church could seat 170 people in the nave and a further 150 people on the verandahs on either side of the church. Timber from the recently demolished St Joseph's Catholic Church in Nambour was used to construct the Maroochydore church to reduce the costs. The architect was Frank Cullen and the contractor was K. D. Morris.

Maroochydore State High School opened on 28 January 1964.

The Maroochydore Library opened in 1975.

Stella Maris School opened on 30 January 1980.

Horton Park Golf Club was in Maroochydore. The club relocated to Bli Bli in May 2015 and changed names to Maroochy River Golf Club. The relocation of the golf course allowed the Sunshine Regional Council to develop the old golf course into a new city centre for the region known as Sunshine Central. The redevelopment is next to Sunshine Cove, a new sustainable residential and commercial development that has revitalized the general town centre and the development won the award from the Urban Development Institute of Australia for the best residential property Development at its annual Australian awards night in 2016.

== Demographics ==
In the 2016 census, the suburb of Maroochydore had a population of 16,800 people.

In the 2021 census, the suburb of Maroochydore had a population of 20,629 people.

== Education ==
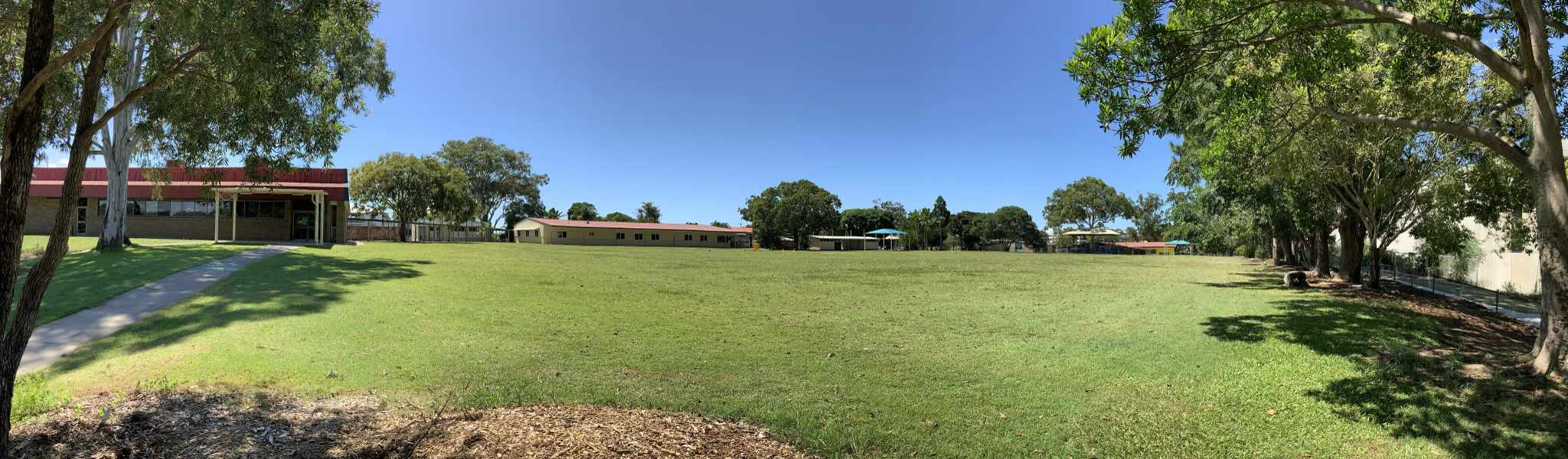
Maroochydore State School, 2020

Maroochydore State School is a government primary (Early Childhood to Year 6) school for boys and girls at 56–68 Primary School Court (26.6529°S 153.0845°E). In 2018, the school had an enrolment of 256 students with 28 teachers (21 full-time equivalent) and 25 non-teaching staff (18 full-time equivalent). It includes a special education program.

Stella Maris School is a Catholic primary (Prep–6) school for boys and girls on McKenzie Drive (26.6537°S 153.0718°E). In 2018, the school had an enrolment of 833 students with 47 teachers (43 full-time equivalent) and 34 non-teaching staff (22 full-time equivalent).

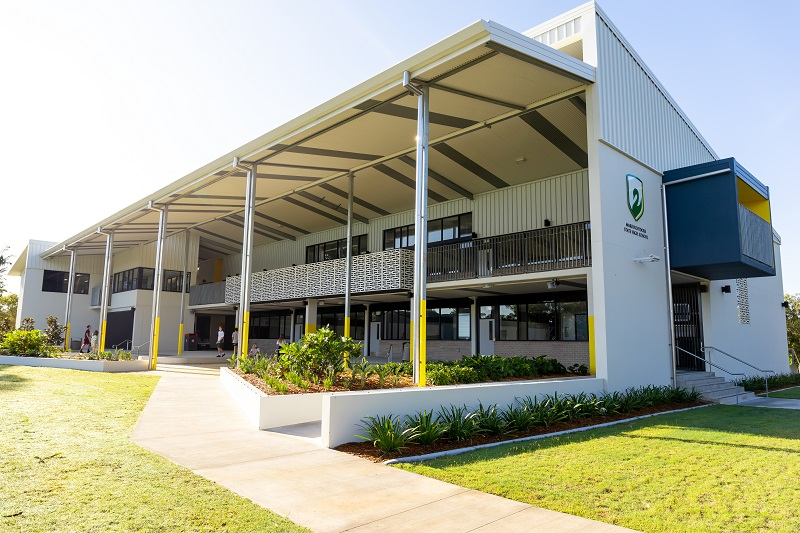
Learning Centre 2, Maroochydore State High School, 2020

Maroochydore State High School is a government secondary (7–12) school for boys and girls at 160 Maroochydore Road (26.6547°S 153.0755°E). In 2018, the school had an enrolment of 1,321 students with 106 teachers (97 full-time equivalent) and 47 non-teaching staff (34 full-time equivalent). It includes a special education program.
