= Kuluin, Queensland =

Kuluin
- Suburb
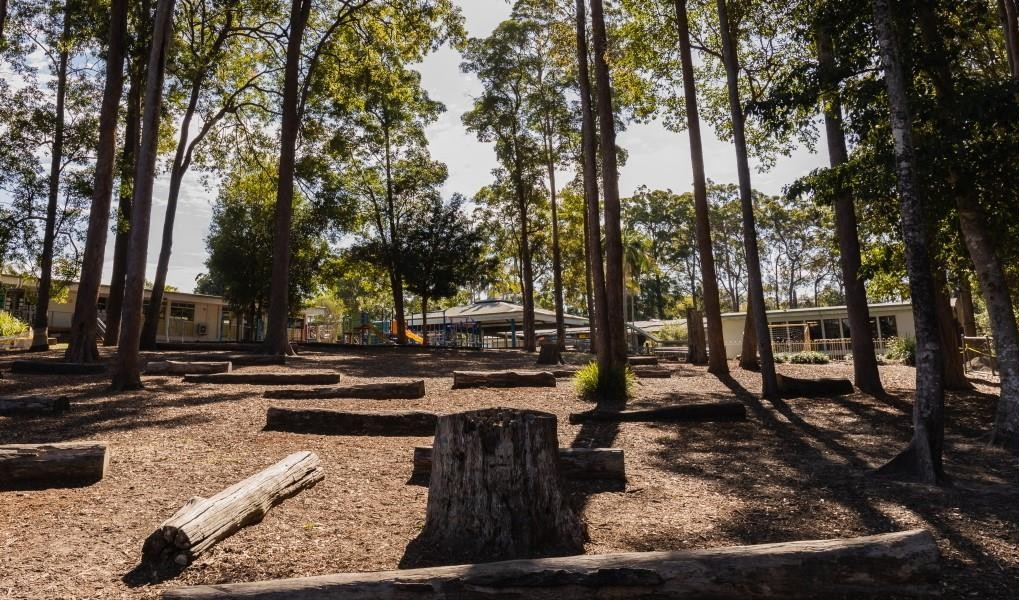
- Kuluin State School, 2025

- Interactive map of Kuluin
- Coordinates: 26.6566°S 153.0594°E
- Country: Australia
- State: Queensland
- City: Sunshine Coast
- LGA: Sunshine Coast Region
- Location: 3.4 km (2.1 mi) W of Maroochydore; 13.3 km (8.3 mi) ESE of Nambour; 23.1 km (14.4 mi) NNW of Caloundra; 101 km (63 mi) N of Brisbane

Government
  - State electorate: Ninderry
  - Federal division: Fairfax

Area
  - Total: 1.9 km^{2} (0.73 sq mi)

Population
  - Total: 2,700 (2021 census)
  - Density: 1,420/km^{2} (3,680/sq mi)
- Time zone: UTC+10:00 (AEST)
- Postcode: 4558
- County: Canning
- Parish: Mooloolah
Suburbs around Kuluin
Diddillibah	Maroochydore	Maroochydore
Kunda Park	Kuluin	Maroochydore
Buderim	Buderim	Buderim

Kuluin is a suburb of Maroochydore in the Sunshine Coast Region, Queensland, Australia. In the 2021 census, Kuluin had a population of 2,700 people.

== History ==
The locality takes its name from an Aboriginal word in the Kabi language meaning black swan.

Kuluin State School opened in 1987.

Kuluin was originally part of the nearby towns of Maroochydore and Buderim. It became a separate suburb in 1991.

== Demographics ==
In the 2016 census, Kuluin had a population of 2,363 people.

In the 2021 census, Kuluin had a population of 2,700 people.

== Education ==
Kuluin State School is a government primary (Prep–6) school for boys and girls at Tallow Wood Drive (26.6598°S 153.0579°E). In 2017, the school had an enrolment of 622 students with 47 teachers (41 full-time equivalent) and 21 non-teaching staff (16 full-time equivalent). In 2018, the school had an enrolment of 596 students with 46 teachers (38 full-time equivalent) and 20 non-teaching staff (15 full-time equivalent). The school includes a special education program.

There are no secondary schools in Kuluin. The nearest government secondary school is Maroochydore State High School in neighbouring Maroochydore to the east.

== Amenities ==
There are a number of parks in the area:

- Daintree Cl Park, Drain (26.6571°S 153.0589°E)
- Daintree Park (17.6819°S 102.0227°E)
- Kuluin Neighbourhood Park (26.6611°S 153.0629°E)
- Kuskoff Park (26.6604°S 153.0500°E)
- Martins Creek Bushland Conservation Reserve (17.7739°S 102.0305°E)
- Martins Creek Soccer Ground (26.6600°S 153.0472°E)
- Mcarthur Park (26.6616°S 153.0554°E)
- South Eudlo Creek Bushland Conservation Reserve (26.6550°S 153.0528°E)
- Tallow Wood Drive Environmental Park (26.6590°S 153.0563°E)
