= Alexandra Headland, Queensland =

Alexandra Headland
- Suburb
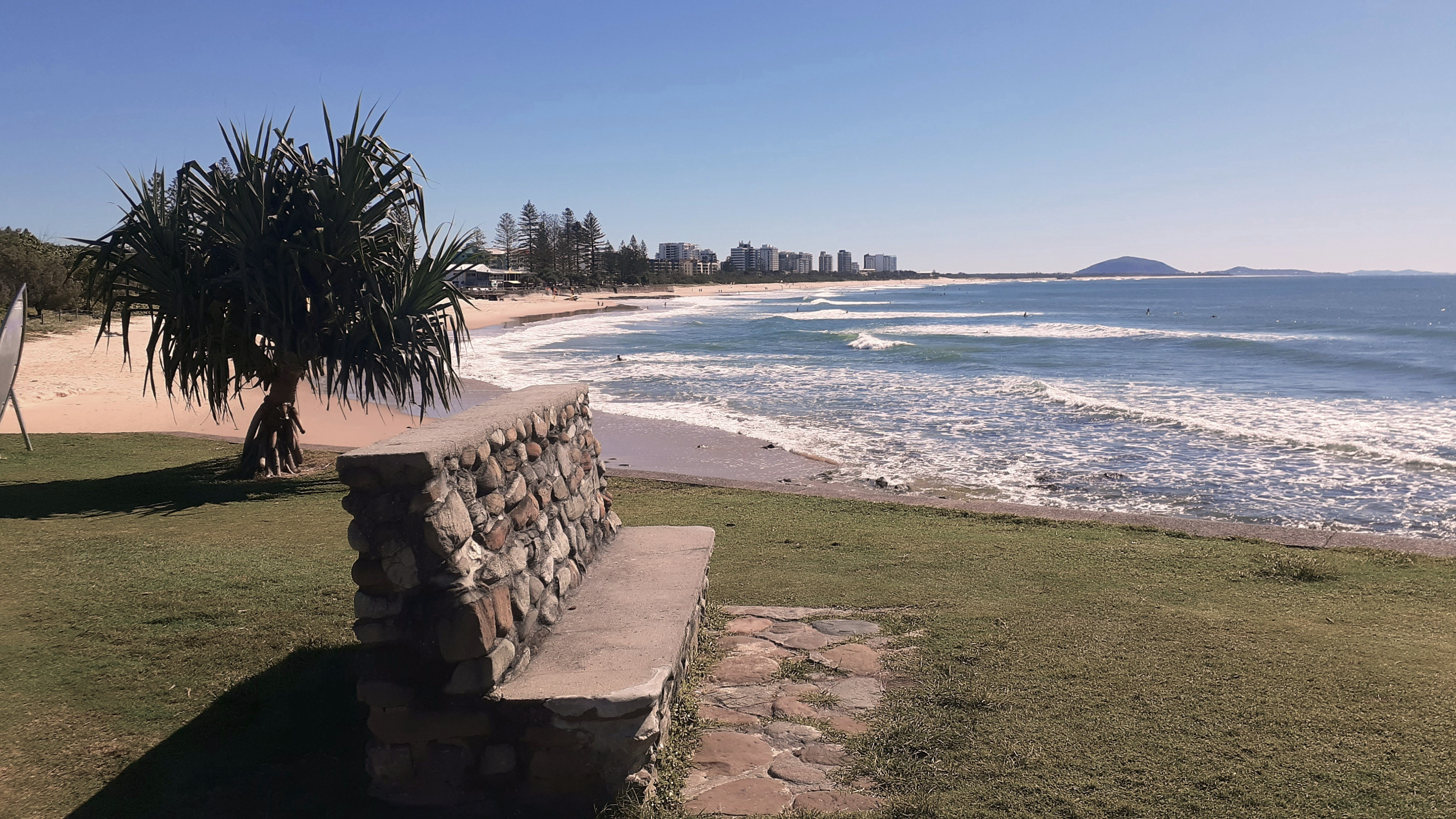
- Alexandra Headland Beach with Mount Coolum in the background, 2021

- Interactive map of Alexandra Headland
- Coordinates: 26.6733°S 153.1011°E
- Country: Australia
- State: Queensland
- City: Maroochydore
- LGA: Sunshine Coast Region
- Location: 3.6 km (2.2 mi) SE of Maroochydore; 18.4 km (11.4 mi) N of Caloundra; 19.3 km (12.0 mi) ESE of Nambour; 112 km (70 mi) N of Brisbane

Government
  - State electorate: Maroochydore
  - Federal division: Fisher

Area
  - Total: 1.6 km^{2} (0.62 sq mi)

Population
  - Total: 4,235 (2021 census)
  - Density: 2,650/km^{2} (6,860/sq mi)
- Time zone: UTC+10:00 (AEST)
- Postcode: 4572
- County: Canning
- Parish: Mooloolah
Suburbs around Alexandra Headland
Maroochydore	Cotton Tree	Coral Sea
Buderim	Alexandra Headland	Mooloolaba
Buderim	Mooloolaba	Mooloolaba

Alexandra Headland is a coastal suburb of Maroochydore in the Sunshine Coast Region, Queensland, Australia. In the 2021 census, Alexandra Headland had a population of 4,235 people.

== Geography ==
Alexandra Headland is located between Maroochydore CBD and Mooloolaba.

== History ==
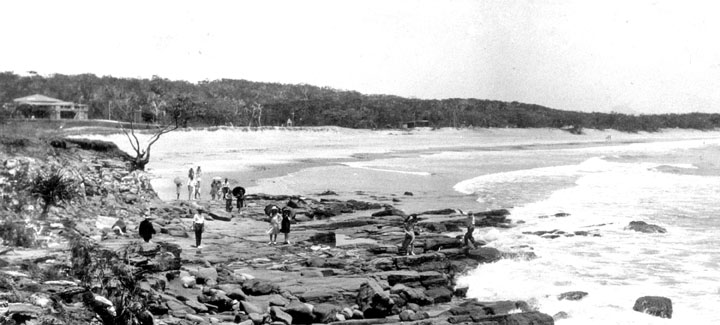
Beach at Alexandra Headland, 1931

The rocky headland between the estuaries of the Maroochy and Mooloolah Rivers was once known as Potts Point, named after overseer John Potts employed by William Pettigrew. Potts lived on the land from 1880 to 1890, when it was used to transport timber between Cotton Tree and Mooloolah River by bullock. It was renamed Alexandra Headland in honour of Queen Alexandra, wife of King Edward VII, in 1901.

The area was formerly part of William Pettigrew's 330-acre (130 ha) property. The land was purchased in 1864 at the first land sale in the Maroochy District. Over the next 30 years it was used as Pettigrew's base for his timber business. The area was fenced as a paddock for the bullocks used to haul logs from Cotton tree across Potts Point to the timber depot at Mooloolaba (formerly known as Mooloolah Heads). Pettigrew built his house "Coolaluthin" and his overseers house "Wongotha" on the Headland.

Thomas O'Connor purchased all of Pettigrew's land at both Maroochydore and Mooloolaba in 1903. The land was subdivided and sold as allotments along the ocean front and Buderim Road in August 1915.

Seaside cottages were built on the Headland during the 1920s. These were mostly built by the local residents from Woombye and Palmwoods.

Plans for O'Connors hotel, 1916

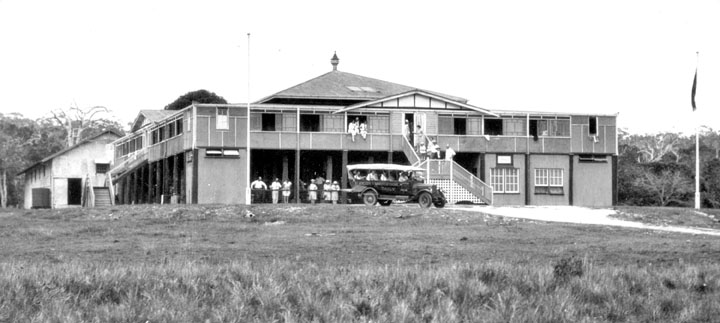
Alexandra Headland Hostel, 1931

In 1916, O'Connor proposed to develop the Alexandra Residential Hotel on 36 acres behind the main surfing beach on the corner of Alexandra Parade, Main Buderim Mountain Road (now Buderim Avenue) and Edward Street. The architect was Thomas Ramsay Hall. This temperance hostel was constructed between 1923 and 1928, opening on 31 December 1928. This was the first fully integrated resort complex on the Maroochy coast. The endeavour proved unsuccessful and was sold to the Presbyterian Church in 1945. In 2004 to 2005, the Uniting Church of Australia redeveloped the site to establish the Alexandra Park Conference Centre.

With the ensuing upgrading of transport services and roads as well as further land sales saw the continued progress of Alexandra Headland as a holidays resort. The Headland now boasted a holiday resort with all facilities, including a patrolled surf beach on its northern edge.

== Demographics ==
In the 2016 census, Alexandra Headland recorded a population of 3,958 people, 51.9% female and 48.1% male. The median age of the Alexandra Headland population was 45 years, 7 years above the national median of 38. 68.6% of people were born in Australia. The next most common countries of birth were New Zealand 4.9% and England 4.8%. 82.5% of people only spoke English at home. The most common responses for religion were No Religion 32.8%, Catholic 19.4% and Anglican 15.0%.

In the 2021 census, Alexandra Headland had a population of 4,235 people.

== Education ==
There are no schools in Alexandra Headland. The nearest government primary school is Mooloolaba State School in neighbouring Mooloolaba to the south-east. The nearest government secondary schools are Maroochydore State High School in neighbouring Maroochydore to the north-west and Mountain Creek State High School in Mountain Creek to the south.

== Amenities ==
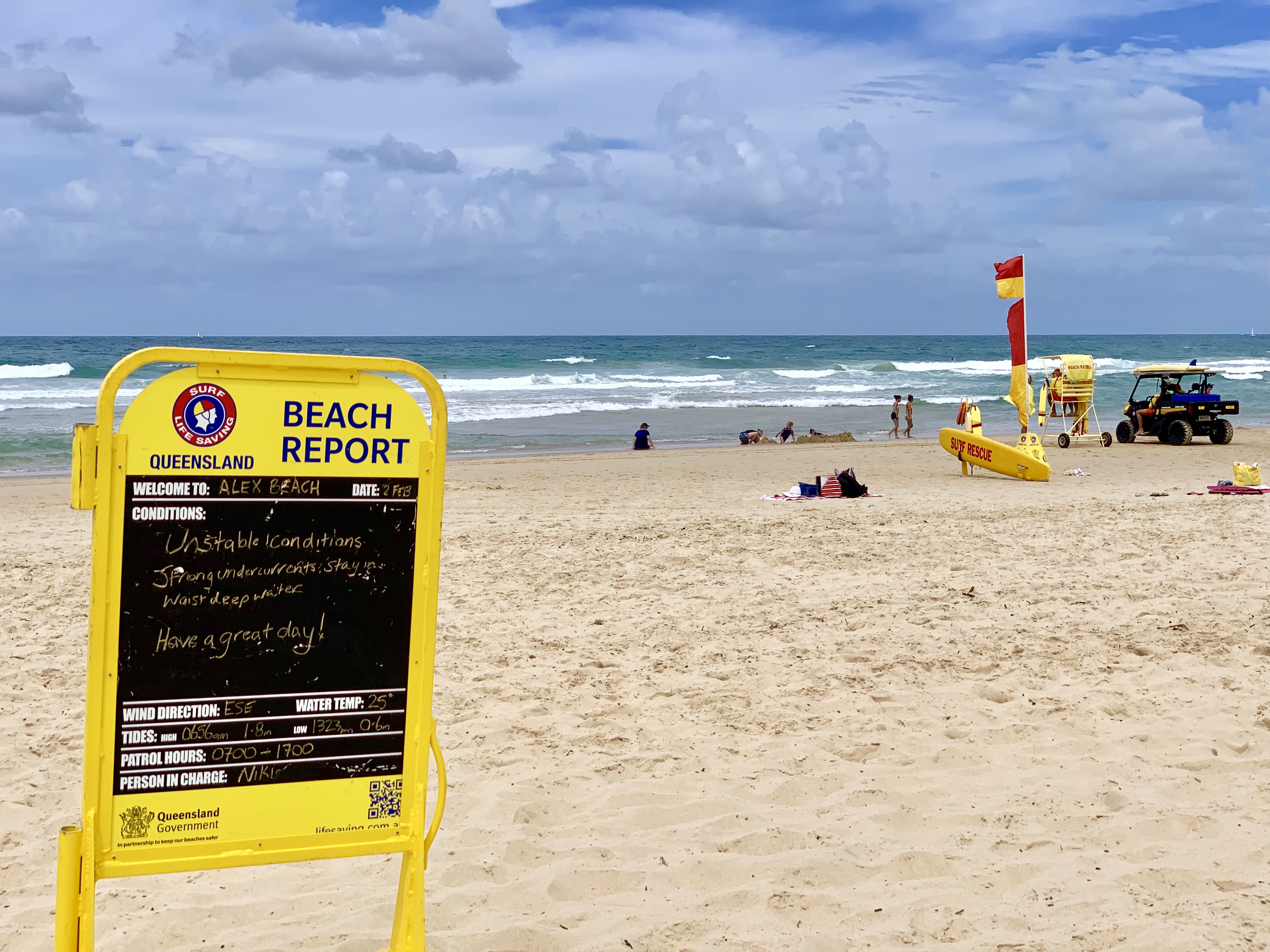
Surf life savers patrolling the beach, Alexandra Headland, 2019

Alexandra Park Conference Centre is at 13 Mari Street (26.6697°S 153.1027°E). It is operated by the Uniting Church of Australia and has conference rooms, accommodation, and catering facilities.

Alexandra Headland Surf Life Saving Club is at 167 Alexandra Parade (26.6690°S 153.1074°E). Its members patrol local beaches to ensure swimmers are safe in the surf and provide rescues and first aid as required. The clubhouse has a restaurant and bar.

There are a number of parks in suburb, including:

- Alex Bluff Foreshore Park (26.6746°S 153.1141°E)
- Alex Forest Conservation Area (26.6684°S 153.1017°E)
- Buhk Family Park (26.6672°S 153.1068°E)
- Cooloolathin Park (26.6653°S 153.1056°E)
- Cotton Tree – Alex Foreshore Bushland Conservation Reserve (17.7783°S 102.0721°E)
- Marina Walk (26.6755°S 153.1141°E)
- Nelson Park (26.6665°S 153.1047°E)
- Seaforth Park (26.6642°S 153.1051°E)
- Wilkes Family Park (26.6698°S 153.1077°E)
