= Cotton Tree, Queensland =

Cotton Tree
- Suburb
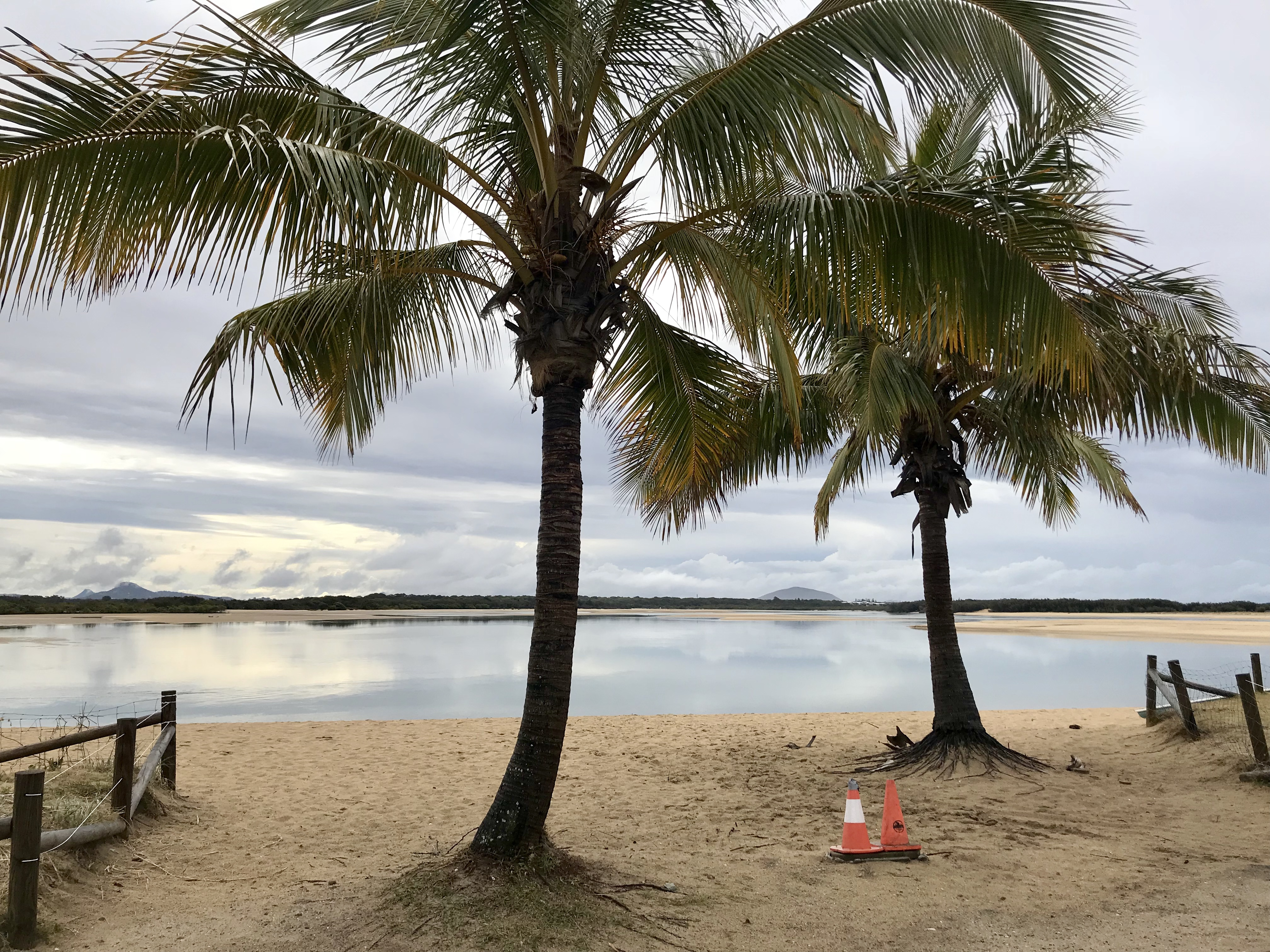
- The bank of Maroochy River in Cotton Tree, 2018

- Coordinates: 26.6528°S 153.1005°E
- Country: Australia
- State: Queensland
- City: Maroochydore
- LGA: Sunshine Coast Region
- Location: 16.6 km (10.3 mi) E of Nambour; 19.6 km (12.2 mi) N of Caloundra; 109 km (68 mi) N of Brisbane

Government
  - State electorate: Maroochydore
  - Federal division: Fairfax
- Postcode: 4558
- County: Canning
Suburbs around Cotton Tree
Maroochydore	Maroochy River	Coral Sea
Maroochydore	Cotton Tree	Coral Sea
Maroochydore	Alexandra Headland	Coral Sea

Cotton Tree is a coastal neighbourhood within the suburb of Maroochydore in the Sunshine Coast Region, Queensland, Australia.

== Geography ==
Although not officially bounded, Cotton Tree is generally recognised as being bounded by the Maroochy River and Cornmeal Creek to the north, and to the south and west by Aerodrome Road and by the Pacific Ocean to the east.

== Etymology ==
The area takes its name from a large Hibiscus tiliaceus tree which is also known as the cotton tree. Plenty of these are still visible near the caravan park and old creek around Fourth Avenue.

== History ==
The first European 'holiday maker' to arrive was convict John Graham in 1827 who escaped from Moreton Bay and spent six years living with local aborigines belonging to the Gubbi Gubbi language group.

The whole (Maroochy Shire) area was protected by the Bunya proclamation 1842–1860. This was established after Andrew Petrie explored the area in 1838 and named the Maroochy River using the language of Brisbane aboriginals who accompanied him.

Timber getters arrived in the 1850s but the Maroochy River bar wasn't navigable so Mooloolah River bar was used instead with Cotton Tree used as a timber depot in 1856 by William Pettigrew and purchased 1864. He ran steamer ships in both rivers and to Brisbane and thus opened a post office receiving office in 1891 as the first shop in Cotton Tree. The headland at Alexandra Headland was used as a bullock paddock and for his own home which was also part of his 330-acre landholding.

The Cotton Tree area was first gazetted as a wharf and water reserve (215 acres) in 1873. By 1880 it was re-gazetted as a camping reserve and used by the Salvation Army amongst others.

The town of Maroochydore was subdivided from the Cotton Tree reserve in 1903 by Surveyor Thomas O'Connor. (Thomas & O'Connor streets both near Bradman Avenue bear his name).

Until the 1910s, Cotton Tree was accessible only by water. Then a road through what is now Maroochydore was planned to access the area. By 1927 it was a main road. By 1937 it was a bitumen road.

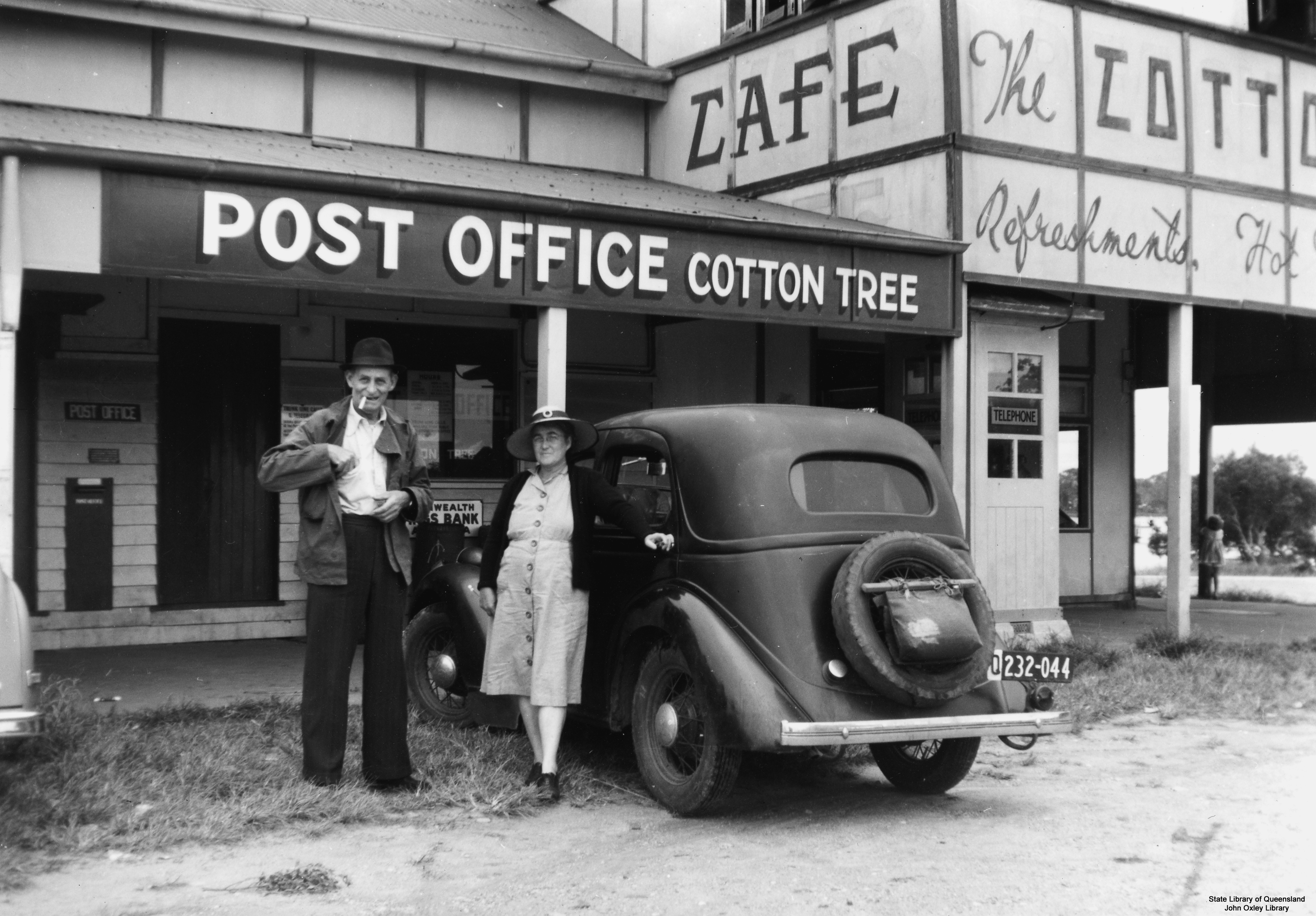
Cotton Tree Post Office in the 1930s

Cotton Tree has its own post office located in King Street since the 1930s.

The fatal Maroochy air crash occurred on the beach on 30 December 1950.

== Heritage listings ==
Cotton Tree has a number of heritage-listed sites, including:

- Cotton Tree Caravan Park, Cotton Tree Parade

A heritage application for Cotton Tree Bacpackers timber building was made but subsequently refused.

== Amenities ==
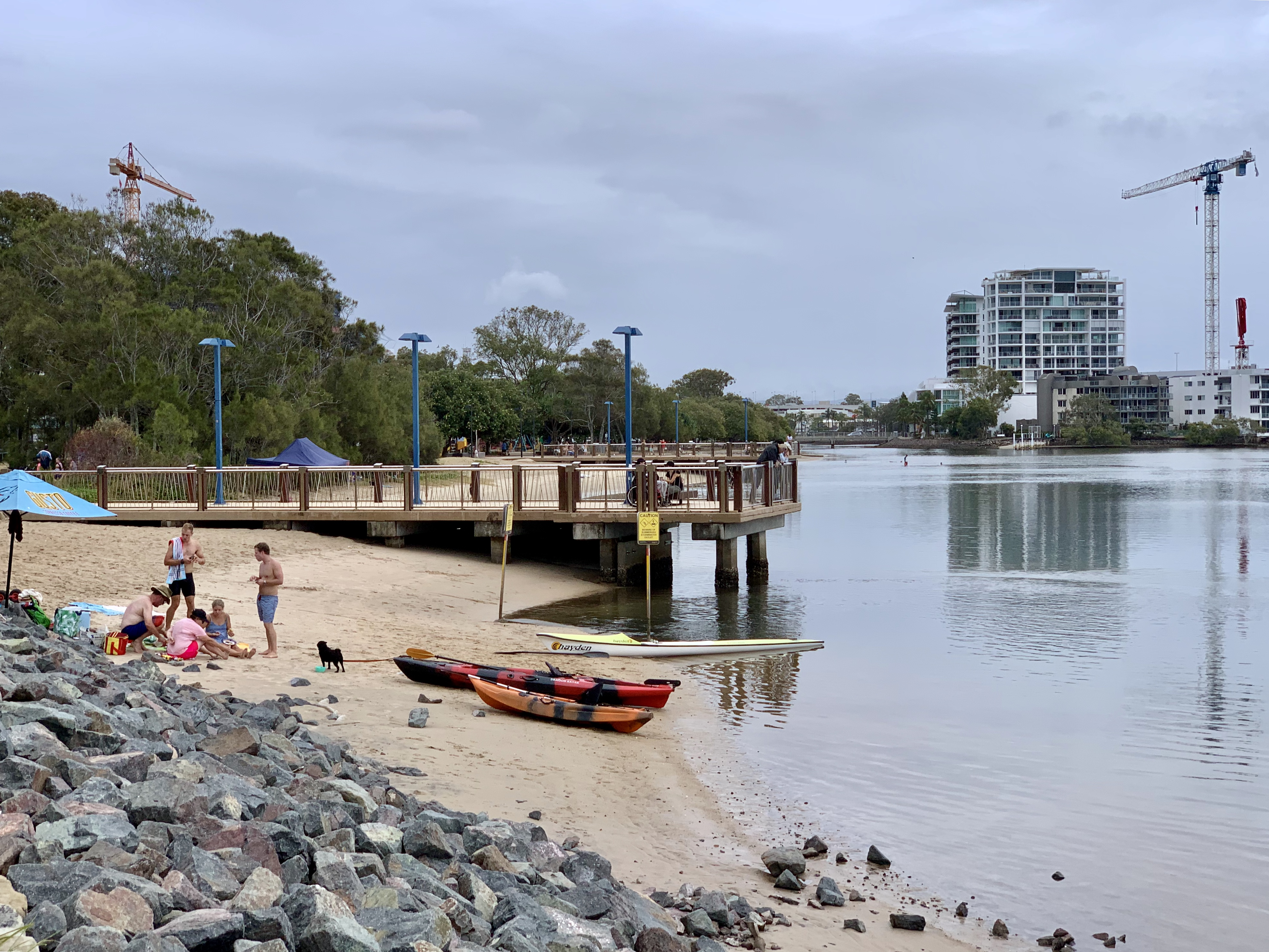
Cotton Tree Pier, 2019

The suburb consists of a beach, a river mouth, several restaurants and cafes, lawn bowls club, RSL club, surf club, Swan's rugby club, library, child care centre, resorts, homes, units, Weir's surf shop, olympic swimming pool and numerous other shops, offices and businesses. The Maroochydore Surf Life Saving Club is right on the beach. Pincushion Island currently sits just 100m off the sand to the north of river mouth. (The river mouth moves not the Island)

A large part of Cotton Tree is used for camping and is now known as the Cotton Tree Caravan Park. Today camping still takes place on 8.7ha of the total 90–110ha. The land size changes significantly based on the sand movement and development of river mouth. Cotton Tree includes 2 caravan parks which maybe heritage listed. Also includes 2 Rugby union fields, 6 tennis courts, 3 bowling greens, 50m swimming pool, 2x0.5 basketball courts, 2 ping pong tables and 2 waterfront parks, 1 on the river, 1 on the beach. Surf breaks include Pipes/Seabreeze, Poofters dunnies/Abdul's, Carpark, Pinnies, the Mouth and North Shore. (Pipes was named after the location of the old sewer effluent pipe, Poofters after a derelict toilet block, Abdul's after death of local surfer Ryan Abdy)

Although 'unbounded' as a suburb it's generally recognised as being east of Aerodrome Road and including all numbered avenues and esplanades. Sometimes known as Forgotten Tree.

== Photo links ==
- Old and New Post Office photo 1936/2010
- Old and New Jetty photo 1930/2011
- Postcard aerial photo 1975
- Postcard aerial photo Pincushion
