= Mount Coolum National Park =

National park in Queensland, Australia

- IUCN category II (national park)
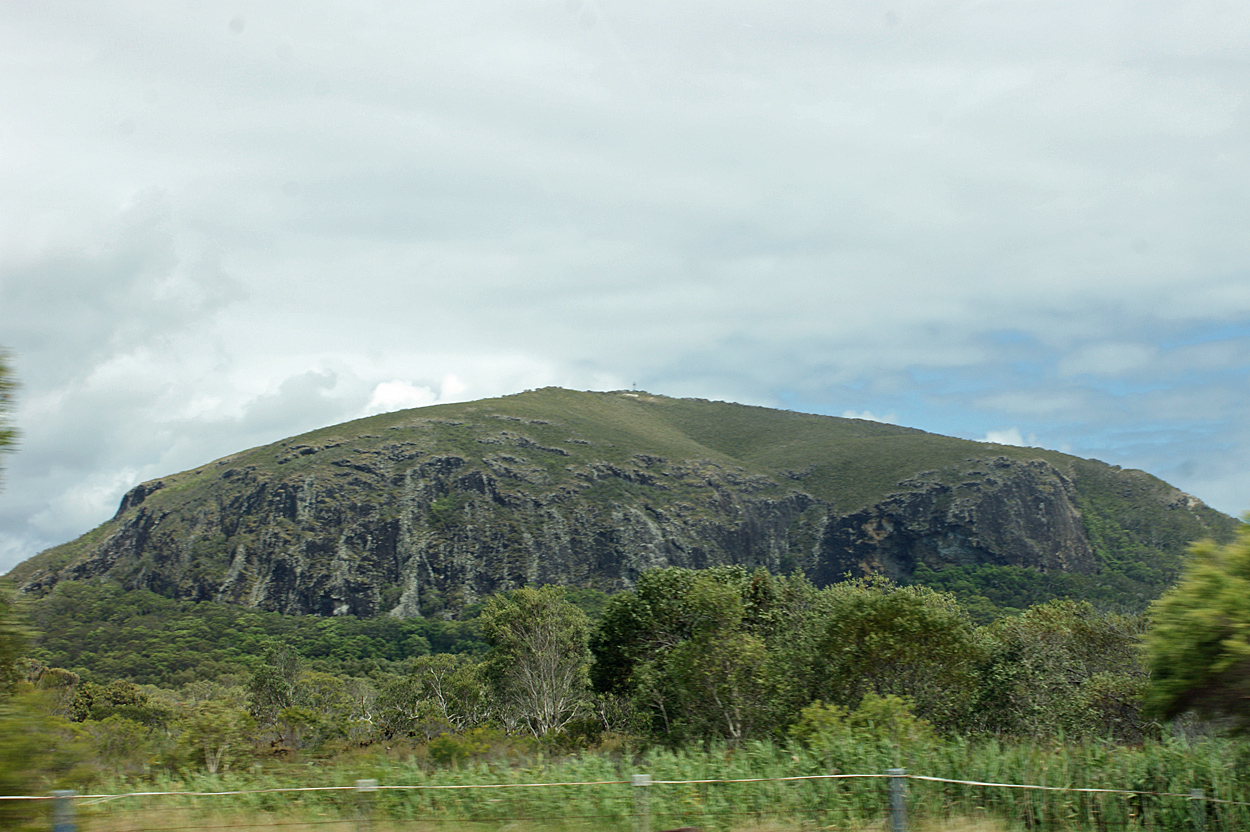
- Mount Coolum seen from the southeast

- Location within Queensland
- Location: Queensland
- Coordinates: 26°33′48″S 153°05′02″E
- Area: 0.69 km^{2} (0.27 sq mi)
- Established: 1990
- Governing body: Queensland Parks and Wildlife Service
- Website: Official website

Mount Coolum is a hill in Mount Coolum National Park in a suburb of the same name in Queensland, Australia. Mount Coolum is located on the Sunshine Coast, 101 km north of Brisbane. It lies between the Sunshine Motorway to the west, the shoreline to the east, Coolum Beach township to the north and Marcoola township to the south.

== Formation ==
Created about 26 million years ago, Mount Coolum is a laccolith, formed when a dome-shaped bulge of magma cooled below the Earth's surface, roughly circular in plan with tall cliffs on the eastern and southern side. It rises abruptly from the coastal plain to a 208 m peak, resembling the Glasshouse Mountains to the south. Mount Coolum is largely formed from 26 million year old rhyolite which forms regular columns and jointing patterns. A disused quarry occupies the eastern foothills of the mountain. After heavy rain there are a number of waterfalls on the cliffs.

== Climbing Mount Coolum ==
A 1.6 km long track climbs Mount Coolum from the east, starting at a carpark on Tanah Street West off David Low Way in the suburb of Mount Coolum. The lower part of the track is deceptively well-formed and gentle but it quickly deteriorates to become very steep, very rough and dangerously slippery when wet.

The walk up and back can be completed in 30–40 minutes; it should not be started after rain or when rain, storms or dusk threaten. The peak hosts a cage containing an aircraft hazard obstacle light, necessary because of the mountain's close proximity to the Sunshine Coast Airport. On average about 140 people climb to the summit each day.

== Ecological values ==
The park is noted for its remarkable botanical diversity; more than 700 different species of plant have been identified there. Vegetation types include eucalypt forest, coastal wallum, paperbark wetland, rare coastal montane heath and some rainforest.

A pair of peregrine falcons are reported to nest on the cliffs.

== See also ==
- Protected areas of Queensland
