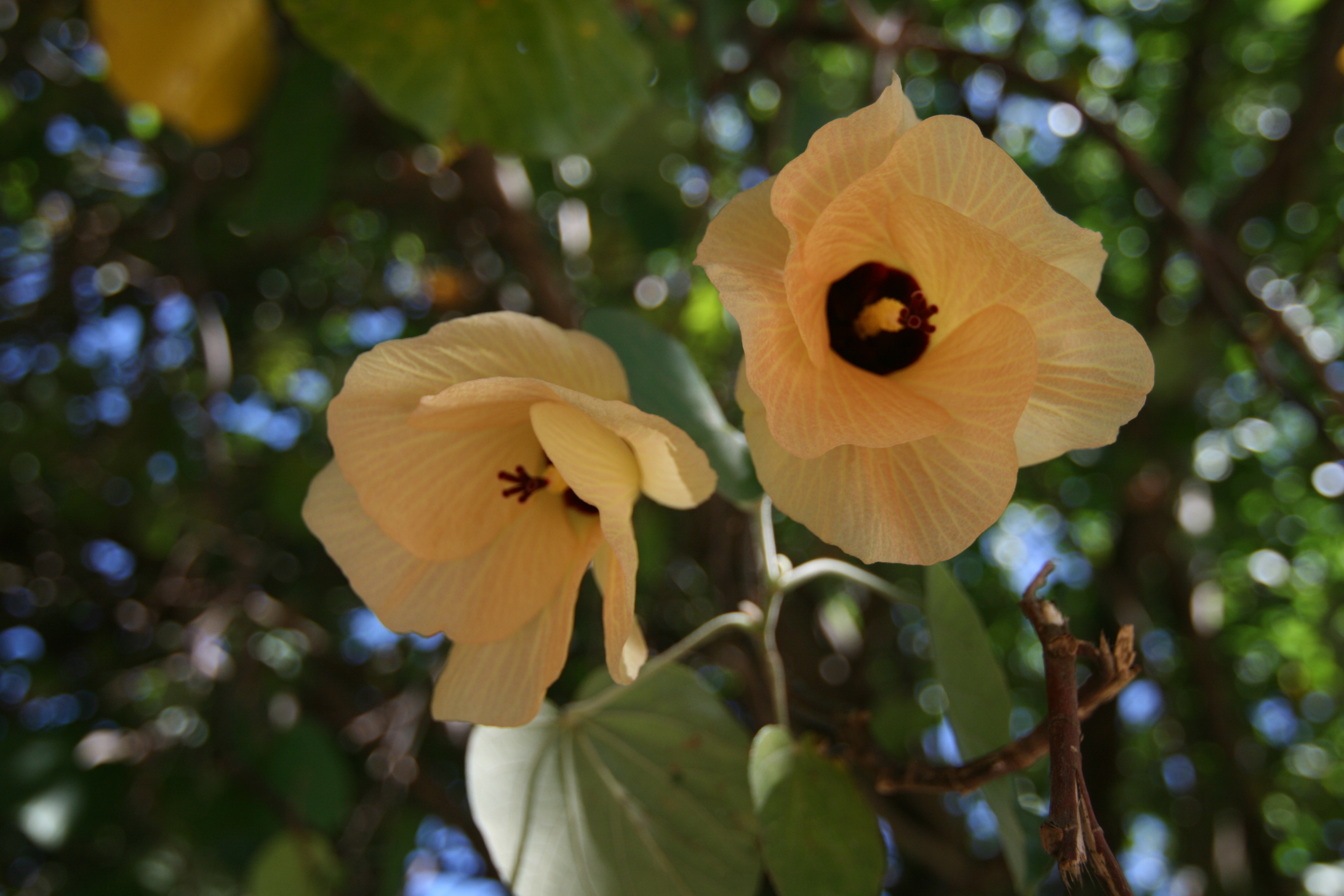
- Sea hibiscus from Tahiti
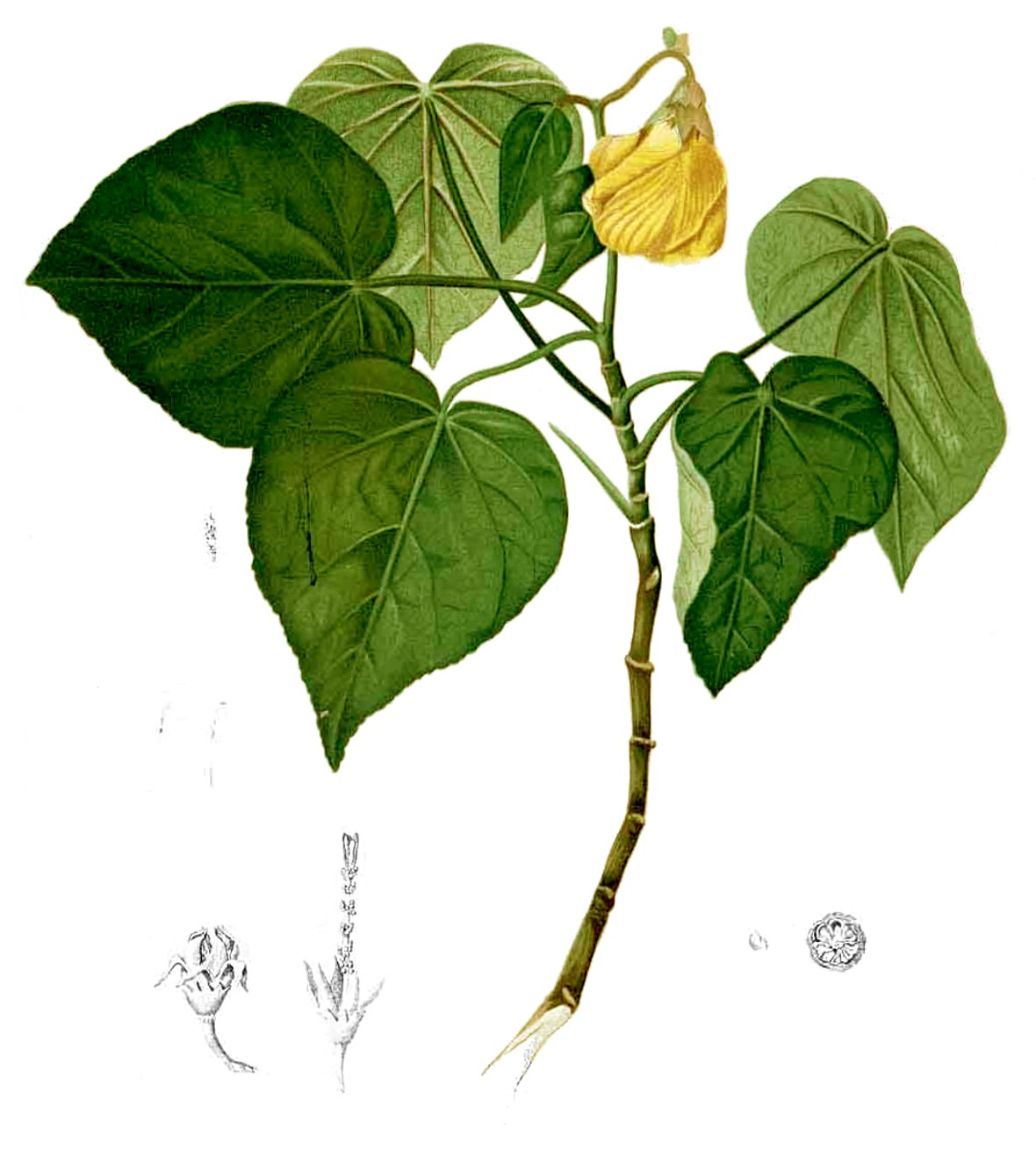
- Sea hibiscus from Flora de Filipinas (Francisco Manuel Blanco, 1880-1883)

Conservation status
- Least Concern (IUCN 3.1)

- Secure (NatureServe)

Scientific classification
- Kingdom: Plantae
- Clade: Tracheophytes
- Clade: Angiosperms
- Clade: Eudicots
- Clade: Rosids
- Order: Malvales
- Family: Malvaceae
- Genus: Hibiscus
- Species: H. tiliaceus

Binomial name
- Hibiscus tiliaceus L. (1753)

Subspecies and varieties
- Hibiscus tiliaceus subsp. crestaensis Borss.Waalk.; Hibiscus tiliaceus subsp. pernambucensis (Arruda) A.Cast.; Hibiscus tiliaceus var. potteri (O.Deg. & Greenwell) H.St.John; Hibiscus tiliaceus subsp. tiliaceus

Synonyms
- Hibiscus tiliaceus var. genuinus Hochr. (1900), not validly publ.; Hibiscus tiliifolius Salisb. (1796), nom. superfl.; Parita tiliaceus (L.) Scop. (1777), combination not made.; Pariti tiliaceum (L.) A.Juss. (1825); Pariti tiliifolium Nakai (1936), nom. superfl.; Talipariti tiliaceum (L.) Fryxell (2001)

= Hibiscus tiliaceus =

Species of flowering tree

Hibiscus tiliaceus, commonly known as the sea hibiscus or coast cottonwood, is an evergreen species of flowering tree in the mallow family, Malvaceae, with a pantropical distribution along coastlines. It has also been introduced to Florida and New Zealand. It has been debated whether this species is native or introduced to Hawaii.

== Names ==
Common names include sea hibiscus, beach hibiscus, coastal (or coast) hibiscus, coastal (or coast) cottonwood, green cottonwood, native hibiscus, native rosella, cottonwood hibiscus, kurrajong, sea rosemallow and dhigga (Maldivian).

The plant was introduced by Austronesian peoples that voyaged across Southeast Asia and Oceania as a source of wood and fibre. This is reflected in the names of the plant as spoken in many related languages spoken in those regions including balibago (Tagalog), malobago (Bikol), malabago or malbago (Cebuano – Southern), maribago (Cebuano – Northern), lambago (Cebuano - Cagayan de Oro), waru (Sundanese & Javanese), varo (Malagasy), baru or bebaru (Malay), pagu (Chamorro), hau (Hawaiian), fau (Samoan), purau (Tahitian), and vau tree (Vietnamese). The specific epithet, "tiliaceus", refers to its resemblance of the leaves to those of the related Tilia species.

== Description ==
Hibiscus tiliaceus reaches a height of 4–10 m (13–33 ft), with a trunk up to 15 cm (5.9 in) in diameter. The flowers of H. tiliaceus are bright yellow with a deep red center upon opening. Over the course of the day, the flowers deepen to orange and finally red before they fall. The branches of the tree often curve over time. The leaves are heart shaped and deep red in the var. rubra.

== Distribution and habitat ==
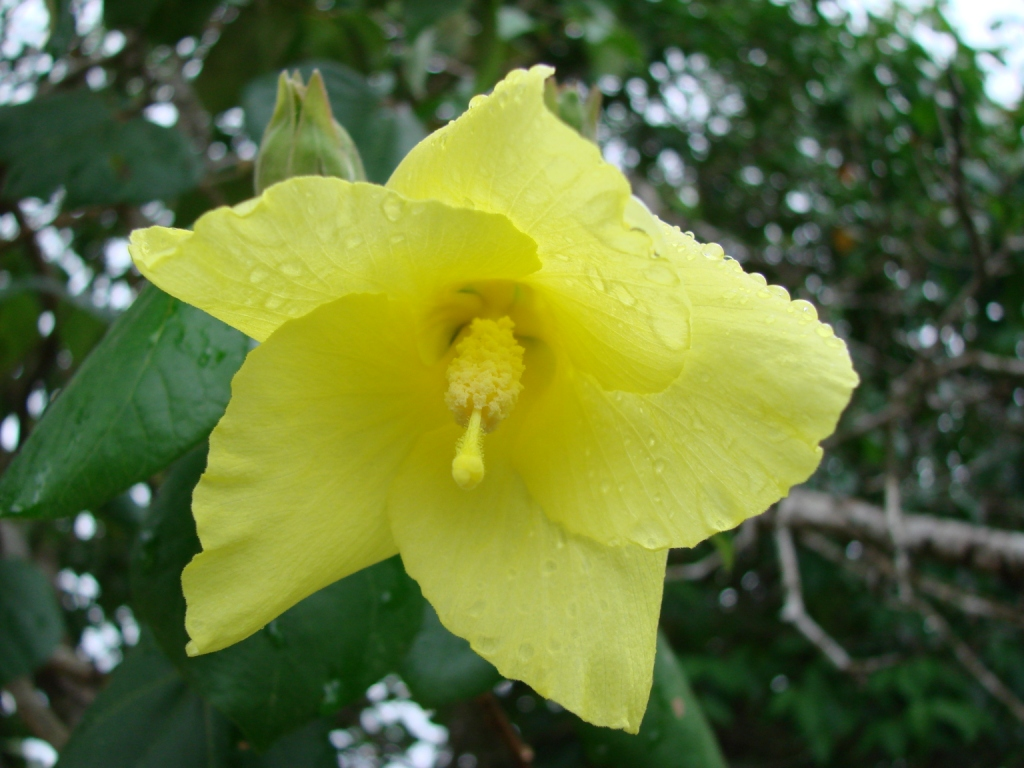
Hibiscus tiliaceus subsp. pernambucensis in Brazil

Hibiscus tiliaceus has a worldwide tropical distribution. In the Old World and Oceania, it is a common coastal plant in most of tropical Africa, South Asia (including the Maldives), Southeast Asia, parts of East Asia (as far north as central Japan, where it reaches its northernmost extent), eastern and northern Australia, and much of the Pacific Islands, including Hawaii (where its establishment status is uncertain). It has also been introduced to New Zealand. A separate subspecies, Hibiscus tiliaceus subsp. pernambucensis (formerly considered a separate species, H. pernambucensis), is native to the tropical New World, including Mexico, Central America, the Caribbean, and much of South America. This variety has also been introduced to Florida.

It is uncertain if the species is native to Hawaii, as it may have been introduced by Polynesians. It is considered native by Plants of the World Online, but the IUCN considers it of uncertain status. Hibiscus tiliaceus can be found at elevations from sea level to 800 m (2,600 ft) in areas that receive 900–2,500 mm (35–98 in) of annual rainfall. It is commonly found growing on beaches, by rivers, and in mangrove forests. Sea hibiscus is well adapted to grow in coastal environment as it tolerates salt and waterlogging and can grow in quartz sand, coral sand, marl, limestone, and crushed basalt. It grows best in slightly acidic to alkaline soils (soil pH of 5–8.5). Cotton Tree, Queensland, Australia and Balibago, Angeles, Philippines are named for the plant.

== Subspecies and varieties ==
Four subspecies and varieties are accepted.

- Hibiscus tiliaceus subsp. crestaensis Borss.Waalk. – Philippines
- Hibiscus tiliaceus subsp. pernambucensis (Arruda) A.Cast. (synonym Hibiscus pernambucensis Arruda) – tropical Americas, from Mexico through Central America and the Caribbean to Ecuador and southern Brazil.
- Hibiscus tiliaceus var. potteri (O.Deg. & Greenwell) H.St.John – Hawaiian Islands
- Hibiscus tiliaceus subsp. tiliaceus – west and west-central tropical Africa, east tropical Africa from Kenya to South Africa, Indian subcontinent, Indochina, southern China, Taiwan, Japan, Malesia, Papuasia, northern and eastern Australia, and the tropical Pacific islands.

== Uses ==
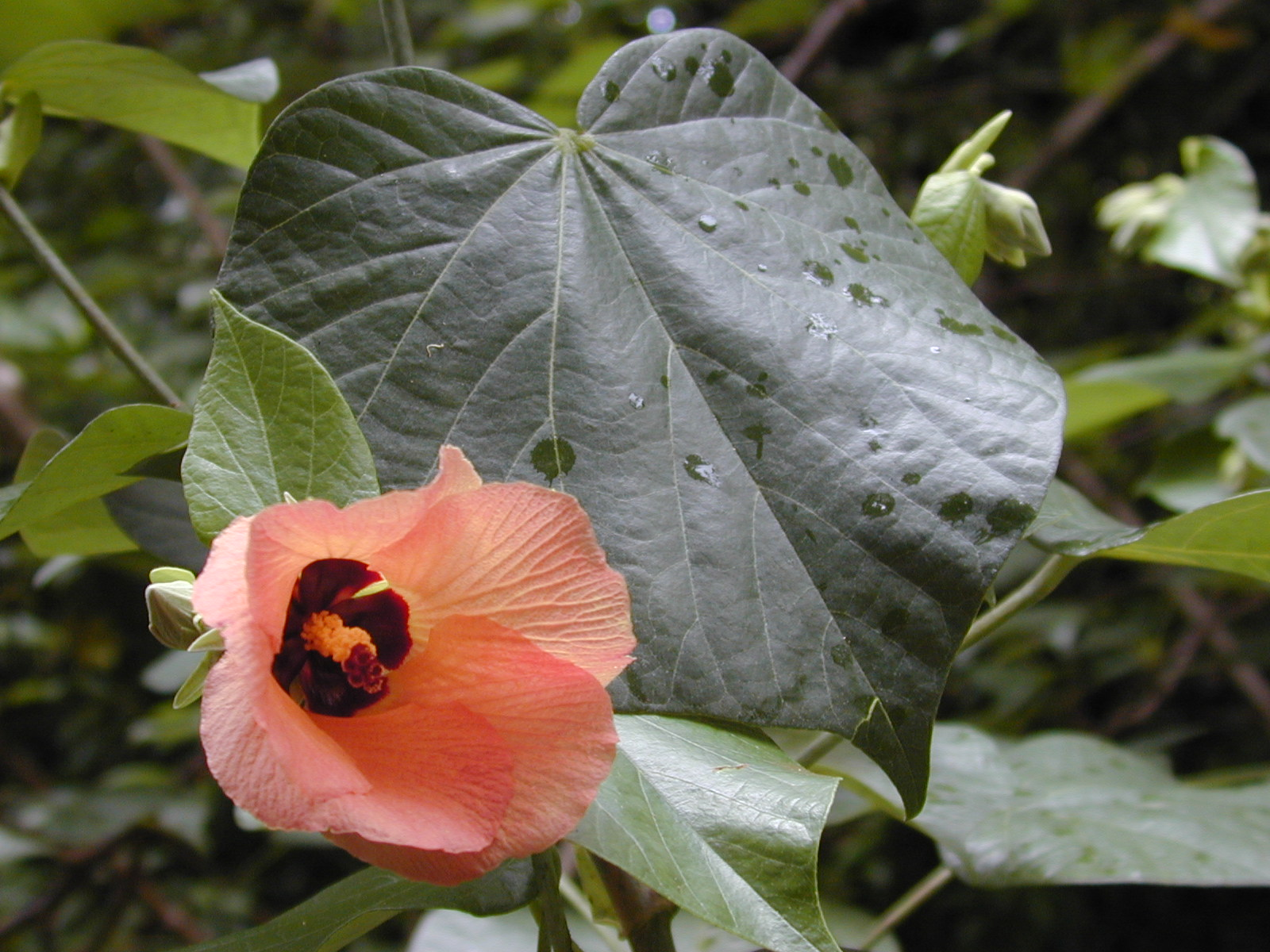
Sea hibiscus from Hawaii

The wood of H. tiliaceus has a specific gravity of 0.6. It has been used in a variety of applications, such as seacraft construction, firewood, and wood carvings. It is easy to plane and turns well, so it is regarded by many as a high quality furniture wood. Plant fibers taken from the stems have traditionally been used in rope making, while its bark has been used like cork, in sealing cracks in boats. The bark and roots may be boiled to make a cooling tea to cool fevers, and its young leafy shoots may be eaten as vegetables. Native Hawaiians used the wood to make ʻiako (spars) for waʻa (outrigger canoes), mouo (fishing net floats), and ʻau koʻi (adze handles). Kaula ʻilihau (cordage) was made from the bast fibers. Hau would be used to make ʻama (canoe floats) if the preferred wiliwili (Erythrina sandwicensis) was unavailable.

Hibiscus tiliaceus is widely used in Asian countries, especially Taiwan, as a subject for the art of bonsai. The finest specimens are taken from Kenting National Park. Lending itself to free grafting, the leaf size is reduced fairly quickly. Its leaves are also used in cooking, as trays for steamed rice cakes (粿).

In Indonesia H. tiliaceus is also used for fermenting tempeh. The undersides of the leaves are covered in downy hairs known technically as trichomes to which the mold Rhizopus oligosporus can be found adhering in the wild. Soybeans are pressed into the leaf, and stored. Fermentation occurs resulting in tempeh.

Indigenous Australians traditionally used the inner bark of the tree to craft fishing nets and ropes, particularly for use with dugong and turtle harpoons. The wood was also employed in the making of shields. Medicinally, the inner bark and sapwood were soaked in water and heated with hot stones, producing a liquid that was applied to wash wounds. Strips of bark were additionally used as natural bandages, wrapped around injuries to cover and close them.

=== Chemistry ===
Chrysanthemin (Cyanidin-3-glucoside) is the major anthocyanin found in flowers of H. tiliaceus. Leaves of H. tiliaceus displayed strong free radical scavenging activity and the highest tyrosinase inhibition activity among 39 tropical plant species in Okinawa Prefecture. With greater UV radiation in coastal areas, it is possible that leaves and flowers of natural coastal populations of H. tiliaceus have stronger antioxidant properties than planted inland populations.

== See also ==
- Domesticated plants and animals of Austronesia
- Thespesia populnea
