= Maroochydore State High School =

Location
- 160 Maroochydore Rd, Maroochydore, Queensland, Australia; 26.6543°S 153.0750°E

Information
- Type: Public, co-educational, secondary, day school
- Motto: Niti et Servire (Latin for To Strive and to Serve)
- Established: 1964
- Principal: David Samaha
- Staff: ~100
- Enrolment: ~1100
- Campus: Suburban
- Colours: Green and gold
- Mascot: Swan
- Publication: Maroochy High News
- Website: https://maroochydoreshs.eq.edu.au/

Maroochydore State High School (commonly abbreviated as 'MSHS') is a co-educational, state secondary school located on the Sunshine Coast in the town of Maroochydore, Queensland, Australia. It is a Cricket School of Excellence.

== History ==
The school opened in 1964 with an enrolment of 200 students.

In 2024, the school had an enrolment of 1,135 students with 99 teachers (92 full-time equivalent) and 49 non-teaching staff (36 full-time equivalent).

== Awards ==
- Queensland Schoolboy Cricket Champions 2007

== Notable alumni ==
- Leanne Evans (Commonwealth Games silver medalist)
- Eric Hipwood (AFL player for the Brisbane Lions)
- Grant Kenny OAM (Ironman title. Bronze in Olympic Kayaking)
- Mal Meninga AM (Rugby League)
