= Nicklin Way =

Road in Sunshine Coast, Queensland, Australia

Coordinates: 26°44′36.74″S 153°07′43.67″E

Nicklin Way Queensland
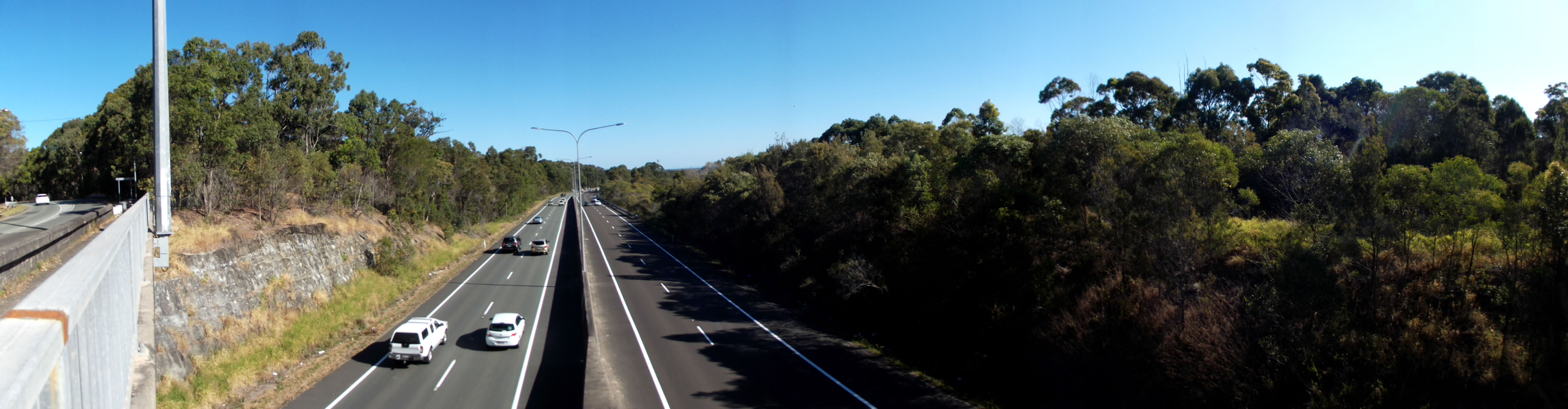
- Nicklin Way, from the Sugarbag Road overbride at Caloundra West

General information
- Type: Road
- Length: 12.8 km (8.0 mi)
- Opened: 5 June 1965
- Route number(s): State Route 6

Major junctions
- North end: Sunshine Motorway (State Route 70), Mooloolaba
- South end: Caloundra Road (State Route 6), Caloundra

Location(s)
- Major suburbs: Warana, Kawana Waters, Currimundi

Nicklin Way (SR6) is a major road in Sunshine Coast, Queensland, Australia. It is named after former Queensland Premier Frank Nicklin, who opened the road on 5 June 1965. It runs from the southern end of the Sunshine Motorway at Mooloolaba in the north to Caloundra in the south, with the route signed as State Route 6. With the population of Sunshine Coast growing quickly, the road is often prone to congestion.

The construction of the road included the construction of concrete bridges spanning the Mooloolah River, Currimundi Lake and Tucker's Creek at Mooloolaba. The bridges spanning Mooloolah River and Currimundi Lake are named McKenzies Bridge and Ahern Bridge respectively.

== Upgrades ==
=== Safety improvements ===
A project to improve safety and capacity on a section of the road, at a cost of $7 million, was completed in November 2020.

=== New intersection ===
A project to provide a new intersection with the road, at a cost of $18.2 million, was in the detailed design stage in August 2022.

== Major intersections ==
The entire road is in the Sunshine Coast local government area.

Location	km	mi	Destinations	Notes
Minyama, Parrearra border	0	0.0	Sunshine Motorway: north–west to Noosaville south–west to Sippy Downs; Brisbane Road (State Route 6): north to Mooloolaba	Northern end of Nicklin Way (State Route 6)
Buddina, Parrearra border	1.5	0.93	Point Cartwright Drive: north to Buddina and Point Cartwright Light	Access to Kawana Shoppingworld
Warana	3.4	2.1	Kawana Island Blvd: west to Parreara (Kawana Island) / Palkana Drive east to Warana	Access to Kawana Way (west) and Oceanic Drive (east)
Warana, Bokarina border	4.6	2.9	Main Drive: west to Birtinya / Wyandra Drive east to Warana and Bokarina	Access to Kawana Way (west) and Oceanic Drive (east)
Bokarina, Wurtulla border	6.3	3.9	Lake Kawana Boulevard: west to Birtinya	Access to Kawana Way and Sunshine Coast University Hospital
Currimundi	9.0	5.6	Creekside Boulevard: west, then north to Meridan Plains	Access to Kawana Way and Caloundra Mooloolaba Road
Currimundi, Battery Hill border	9.4– 9.6	5.8– 6.0	Bellara Drive: west to Currimundi / Buderim Street south–east to Dicky Beach	
Battery Hill, Aroona border	10.4	6.5	Beerburrum Street: west to Aroona, Little Mountain east to Dicky Beach	
Caloundra, Caloundra West, Golden Beach border	12.8	8.0	Caloundra Road: north–west to Little Mountain / Caloundra Road south–east to Caloundra / Pelican Waters Boulevard south to Golden Beach and Pelican Waters	Southern end of Nicklin Way. State Route 6 continues north–west as Caloundra Road.
1.000 mi = 1.609 km; 1.000 km = 0.621 mi
