= Parrearra, Queensland =

Parrearra
- Suburb
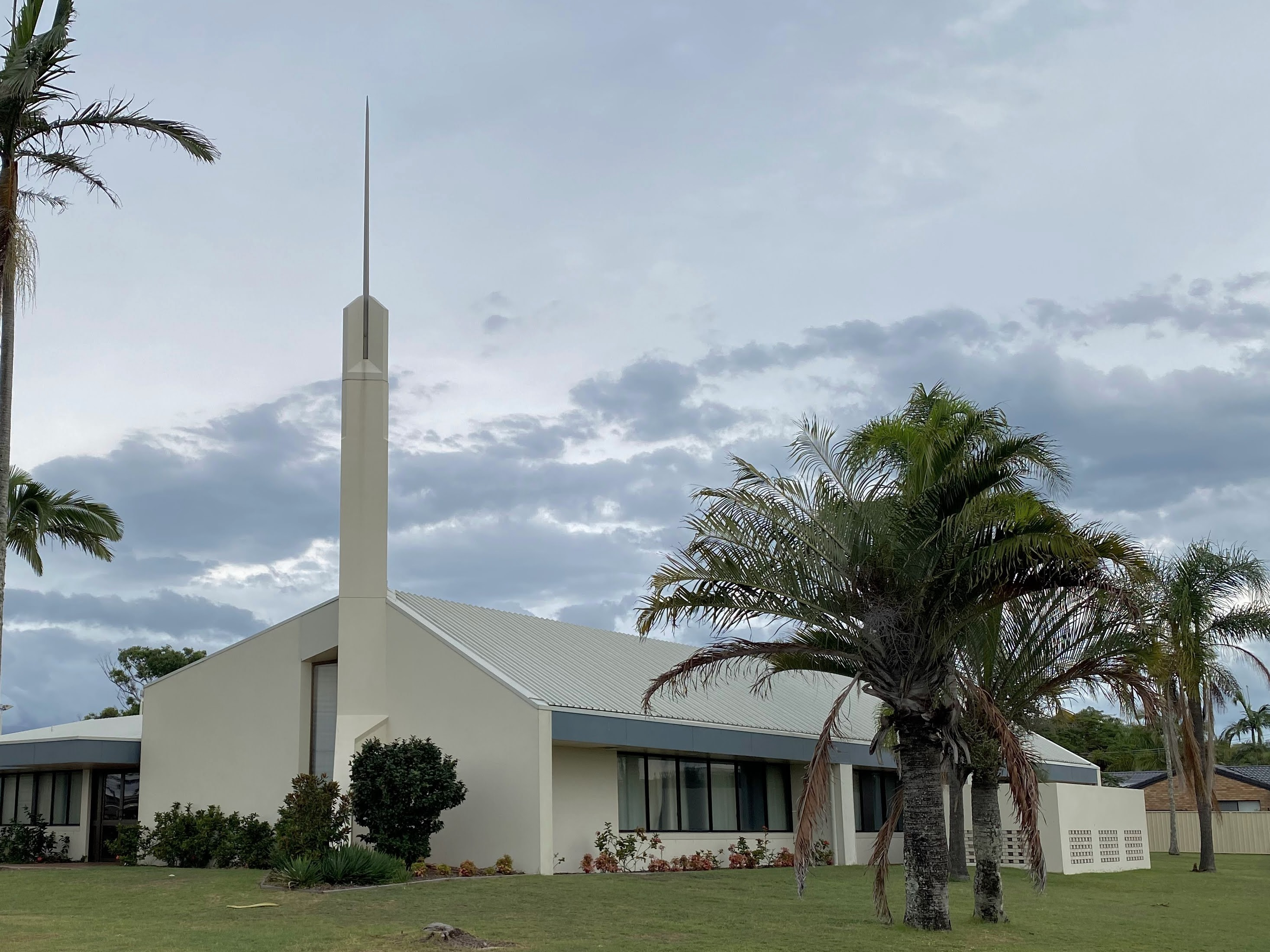
- The Church of Jesus Christ of the Latter-day Saints, 2023

- Interactive map of Parrearra
- Coordinates: 26.7111°S 153.1216°E}
- Country: Australia
- State: Queensland
- City: Sunshine Coast
- LGA: Sunshine Coast Region
- Location: 11.0 km (6.8 mi) SSE of Maroochydore; 12.9 km (8.0 mi) N of Caloundra; 96.3 km (59.8 mi) N of Brisbane
- Established: 1967

Government
  - State electorate: Kawana
  - Federal division: Fisher

Area
  - Total: 2.5 km^{2} (0.97 sq mi)

Population
  - Total: 4,661 (2021 census)
  - Density: 1,860/km^{2} (4,830/sq mi)
- Time zone: UTC+10:00 (AEST)
- Postcode: 4575
- County: Canning
- Parish: Mooloolah
Suburbs around Parrearra
| Mooloolaba | Minyama | Buddina |
| Mountain Creek | Parrearra | Warana |
| Sippy Downs | Warana | Warana |

Parrearra is a suburb in the Sunshine Coast Region, Queensland, Australia. In the 2021 census, Parrearra had a population of 4,661 people.

Parrearra is located within the Kawana Waters urban area and is informally referred to as Kawana Island.

== Geography ==
The suburb is bounded to the west by the Mooloolah River, to the north by Nicklin Way, to the north-east by the Parrearra Canal, to the south-east and south by the Wyuna Canal, making the suburb an island. The canals combined are unofficially known as Parrearra Lake. The primary purpose of the canals together with the associated locks and weirs is for flood mitigation in the Kawana Waters area, while recreational use of the waterways is a secondary purpose.

Access to the island suburb is principally via Kawana Way which enters the suburb from the east (Mountain Creek / Sippy Downs) crossing the Mooloola River and exits the suburb to the south via a bridge over the Wyuna Canal (Warana). Kawana Island Boulevard connects Kawana Way and exits the suburb to the east crossing a bridge over Wyuna Canal to Warana.

Nicklin Way travels the northern boundary of Parrearra from Mooloolaba to Minyama but there is no access from the Nicklin Way into Parearra.

The suburb is residential in character.

== History ==
The name of the suburb was one of several proposed in 1967 by the Kawana Waters developer, Alfred Grant, drawing on an unattributed reference by Justine Kenyon in her book on Aboriginal words, denoting a length of river. Parrearra was named as a town by the Queensland Place Names Board on 1 September 1967, but was redesignated and bounded as a suburb in 1989.

== Demographics ==
In the 2016 census, Parrearra had a population of 4,468 people.

In the 2021 census, Parrearra had a population of 4,661 people.

== Education ==
There are no schools in Parrearra. The nearest government primary schools are Brightwater State School in Mountain Creek to the west and Buddina State School in Buddina to the north-east. The nearest government secondary school is Kawana Waters State College in Bokarina.
