= Warana, Queensland =

Warana
- Suburb
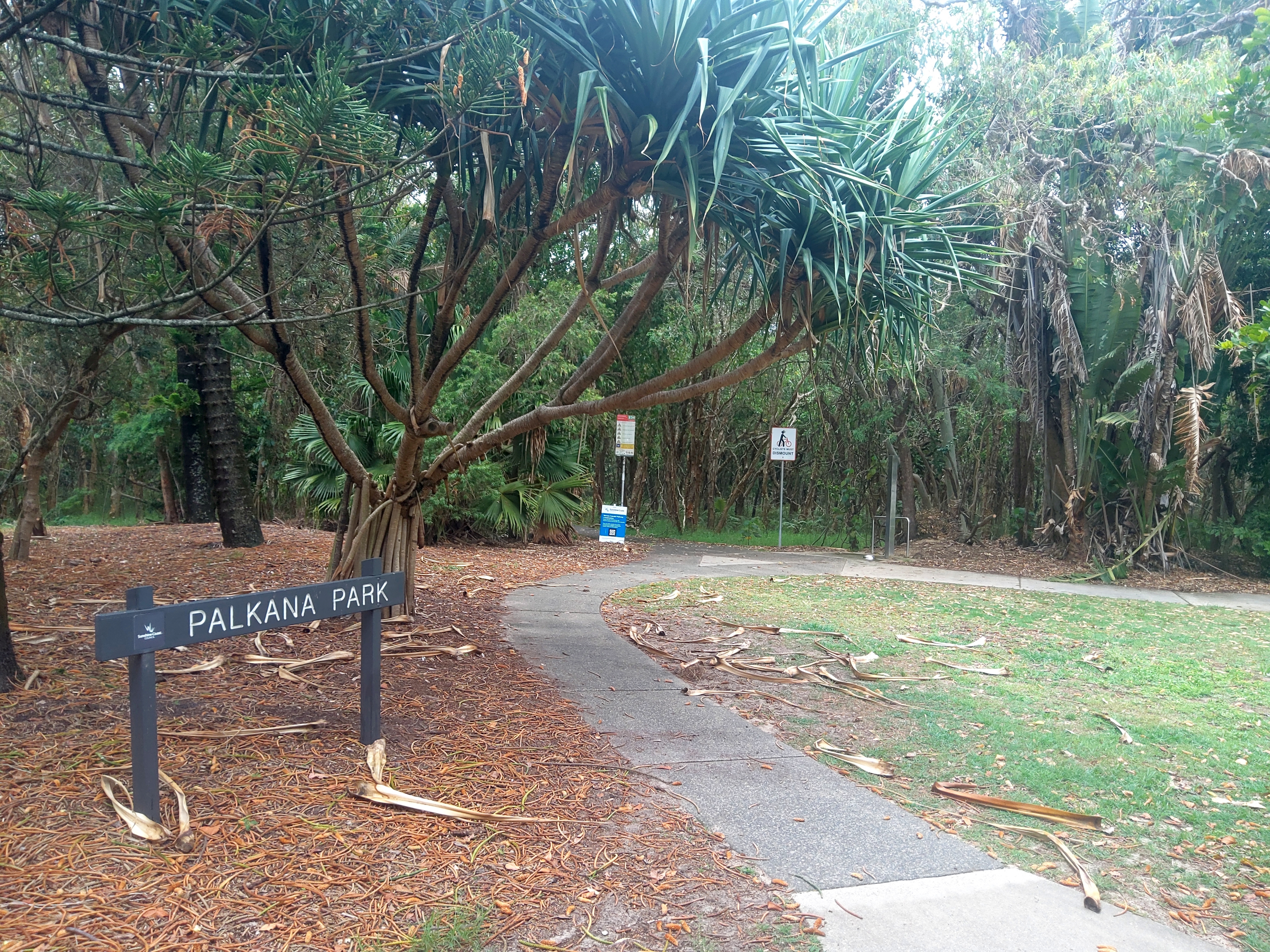
- Palkana Park, 2021

- Interactive map of Warana
- Coordinates: 26.72°S 153.1313°E
- Country: Australia
- State: Queensland
- City: Kawana Waters
- LGA: Sunshine Coast Region
- Location: 10.3 km (6.4 mi) N of Caloundra; 10.8 km (6.7 mi) SSE of Maroochydore; 102 km (63 mi) N of Brisbane

Government
  - State electorate: Kawana
  - Federal division: Fisher

Area
  - Total: 2.9 km^{2} (1.1 sq mi)

Population
  - Total: 3,831 (2021 census)
  - Density: 1,321/km^{2} (3,420/sq mi)
- Time zone: UTC+10:00 (AEST)
- Postcode: 4575
- County: Canning
- Parish: Bribie
Suburbs around Warana
Parrearra	Buddina	Coral Sea
Sippy Downs	Warana	Coral Sea
Birtinya	Bokarina	Coral Sea

Warana is a coastal suburb of Kawana Waters in the Sunshine Coast Region, Queensland, Australia. In the 2021 census, Warana had a population of 3,831 people.

== Geography ==
Warana is located within the Kawana Waters urban centre.

The western boundary of Warana follows the Mooloolah River and the middle of Wyuna Canal.

A coastal reserve, which extends southwards into Bokarina and Wurtulla, has been established along the foreshore preventing beachfront development. The area immediately west of the coastal reserve is residential. In the south-west of the suburb is an industrial estate, the Kawana Sewerage Treatment Plant and an undeveloped marsh area in the far south-west.

== History ==
The name Warana was proposed by land developer Alfred Grant on 31 March 1960 during negotiations with the Queensland Government to develop the land, an arrangement which was agreed in July 1960. Grant claimed that the name Warana meant blue skies in a Tasmanian dialect.

== Demographics ==
In the 2016 census, Warana had a population of 3,688 people.

In the 2021 census, Warana had a population of 3,831 people.

== Education ==
There are no schools in Warana. The nearest government primary schools are Buddina State School in neighbouring Buddina to the north and Kawana Waters State College in neighbouring Bokarina to the south. The nearest government secondary school is also Kawana Waters State College.
