= Minyama, Queensland =

Minyama
- Suburb
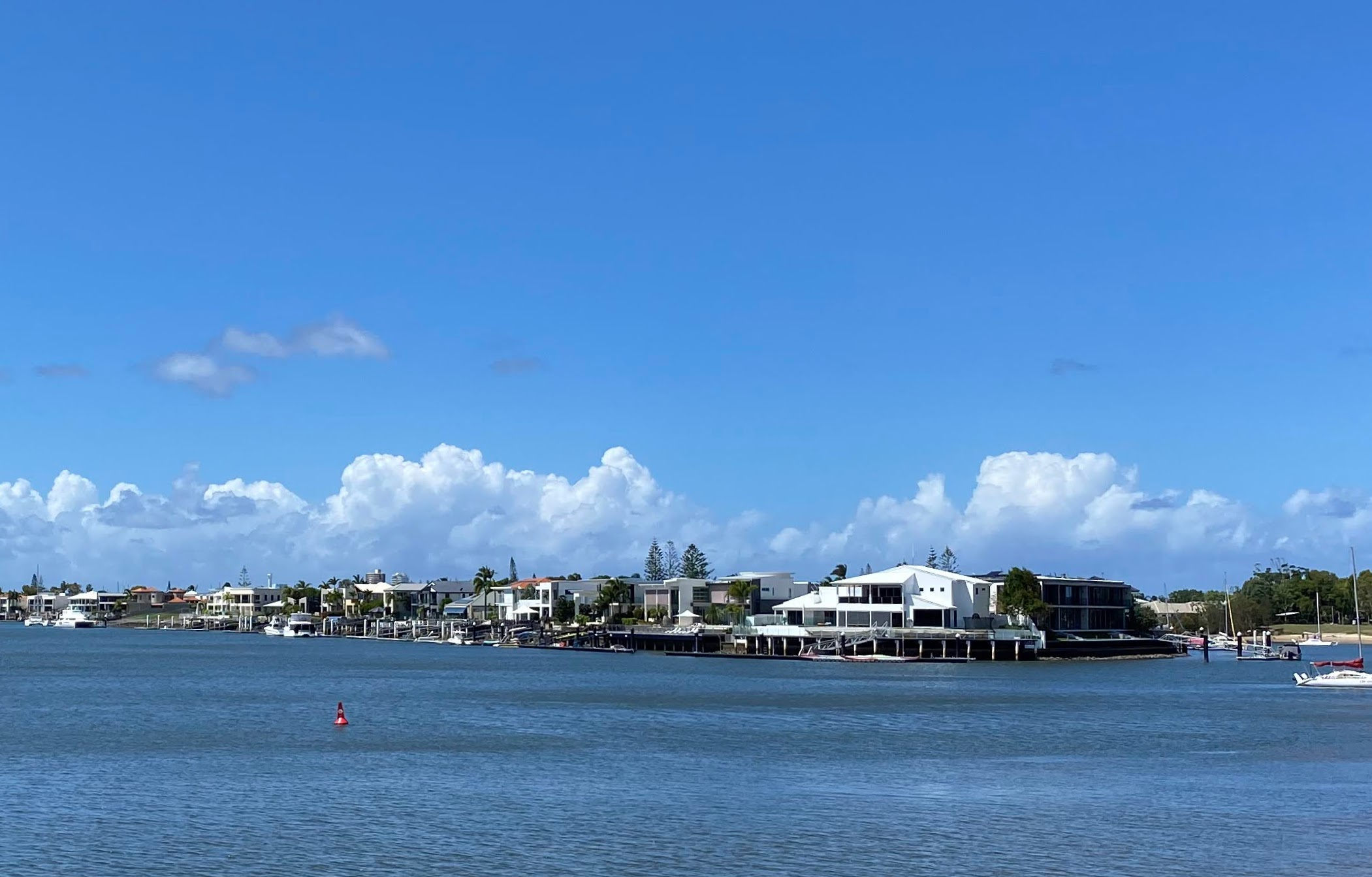
- Mooloolah Island on the Mooloolah River

- Interactive map of Minyama
- Coordinates: 26.6961°S 153.1219°E
- Country: Australia
- State: Queensland
- City: Kawana Waters
- LGA: Sunshine Coast Region
- Location: 7.7 km (4.8 mi) SE of Maroochydore; 14.4 km (8.9 mi) N of Caloundra; 98 km (61 mi) N of Brisbane

Government
  - State electorate: Kawana
  - Federal division: Fisher

Area
  - Total: 2.0 km^{2} (0.77 sq mi)

Population
  - Total: 2,726 (2021 census)
  - Density: 1,360/km^{2} (3,530/sq mi)
- Time zone: AEST
- Postcode: 4575
- County: Canning
- Parish: Mooloolah
Suburbs around Minyama
Mooloolaba	Mooloolaba	Buddina
Mountain Creek	Minyama	Buddina
Parrearra	Parrearra	Buddina

Minyama is a suburb of Kawana Waters in the Sunshine Coast Region, Queensland, Australia. In the 2021 census, Minyama had a population of 2,726 people.

== Geography ==
Minyama is located within the Kawana Waters urban centre. Situated on the Mooloolah River, the suburb is almost entirely surrounded by water, and artificially constructed harbours and waterways dominate the topography. The suburb's main thoroughfare, Nicklin Way, is the location of several large retail outlets. Kawana Shoppingworld is located just outside Minyama.

== History ==
Minyama was named as a town by the Queensland Place Names Board on 1 September 1967, but was re-designated as a suburb on 8 July 1989. The name was proposed by the land developers, Alfred Grant Pty Ltd., developers, and is believed to be an Aboriginal word meaning wildflowers.

In July 2008, McDonald's Australia applied to have a store opened in Minyama. The Sunshine Coast Regional Council rejected the development. Local member of federal parliament Peter Slipper has said that any new development be given serious and honest consideration to the various potential impacts on the community. The McDonald's restaurant was built, but it is not 24 hours, it now closes at 11 o'clock each night and opens at 5 o'clock every morning.

== Demographics ==
In the 2016 census, Minyama had a population of 2,542 people.

In the 2021 census, Minyama had a population of 2,726 people.

== Education ==
There are no schools in Minyama. The nearest government primary school is Buddina State School in neighbouring Buddina. The nearest government secondary school is Mountain Creek State High School in Mountain Creek.
