= Buddina, Queensland =

Buddina
- Suburb
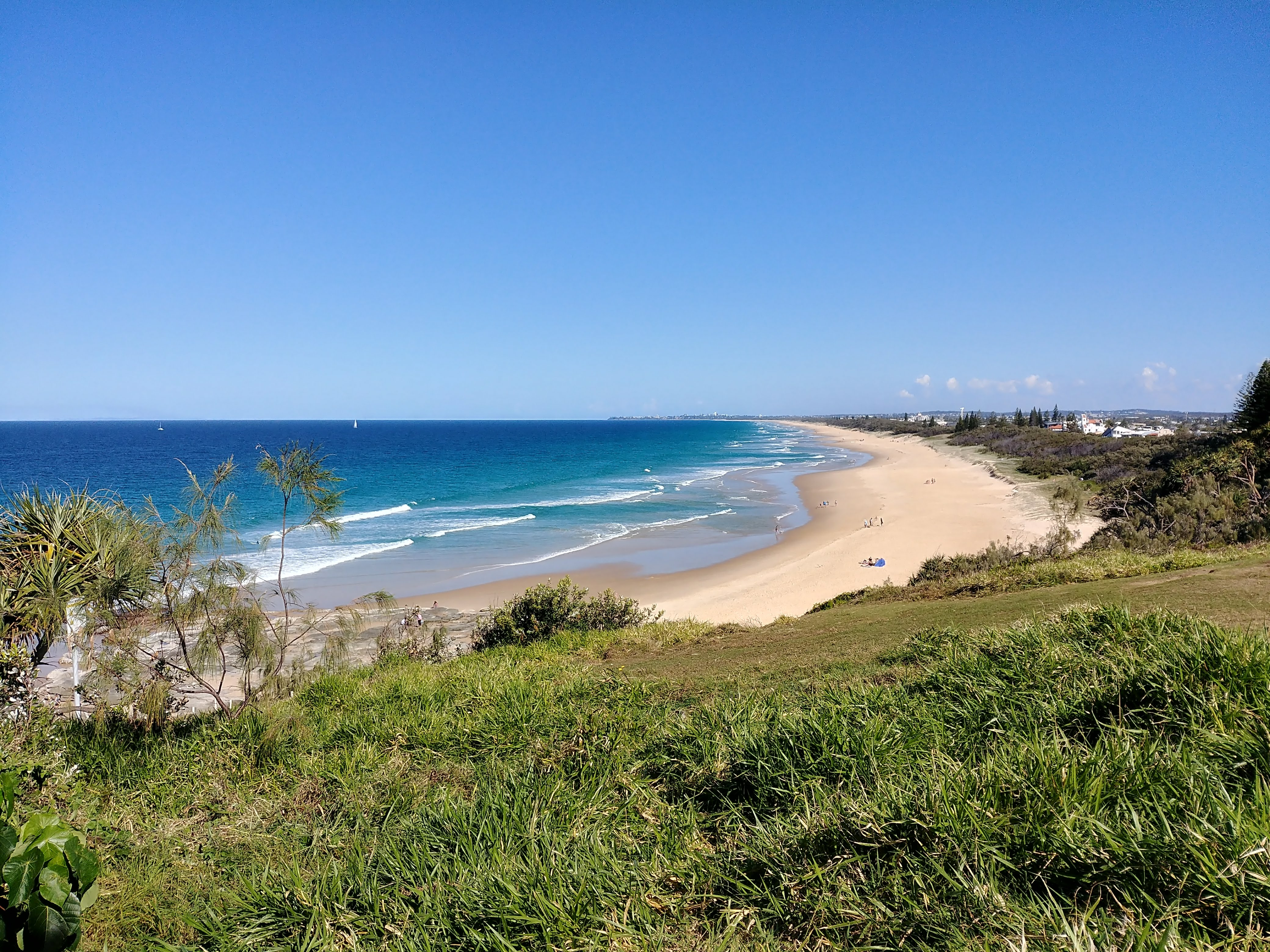
- Beach at Buddina

- Interactive map of Buddina
- Coordinates: 26.6938°S 153.1327°E
- Country: Australia
- State: Queensland
- City: Sunshine Coast
- LGA: Sunshine Coast Region
- Location: 8.7 km (5.4 mi) SE of Maroochydore; 13.4 km (8.3 mi) N of Caloundra CBD; 98.7 km (61.3 mi) N of Brisbane CBD

Government
  - State electorate: Kawana
  - Federal division: Fisher

Area
  - Total: 2.1 km^{2} (0.81 sq mi)

Population
  - Total: 4,236 (2021 census)
  - Density: 2,020/km^{2} (5,220/sq mi)
- Time zone: UTC+10:00 (AEST)
- Postcode: 4575
- County: Canning
- Parish: Mooloolah
Suburbs around Buddina
Mooloolaba	Coral Sea	Coral Sea
Minyama	Buddina	Coral Sea
Parrearra	Warana	Coral Sea

Buddina /bəˈdiːnə/ is a coastal suburb of Kawana Waters in the Sunshine Coast Region, Queensland, Australia. In the 2021 census, Buddina had a population of 4,236 people.

== Geography ==
Buddina includes the business district of the Kawana Waters urban centre.

The eastern half of Buddina fronts the Coral Sea with a long stretch of beaches, whilst the western half of the suburb is a canal neighbourhood.

== History ==
The suburb was named by the Queensland Place Names Board on 1 September 1967. The name was proposed by the land developer Alfred Grant Pty Ltd. Buddina is an Aboriginal word meaning sunbeam.

In 1977 a fatal shark attack was reported on Buddina Beach.

Buddina State School opened on 30 January 1979.

The Kawana Library opened in 1988 with a major refurbishment in 2016.

== Demographics ==
In the 2016 census, Buddina had a population of 3,885 people. 77.7% of people were born in Australia. The next most common countries of birth were New Zealand 5.1% and England 3.9%. 90.0% of people spoke only English at home. The most common responses for religion were No Religion 37.1%, Catholic 19.3% and Anglican 15.9%.

In the 2021 census, Buddina had a population of 4,236 people.

== Education ==
Buddina State School is a government primary (Prep-6) school for boys and girls on the corner of Tumut Street and Iluka Avenue (26.7021°S 153.1331°E). In 2018, the school had an enrolment of 748 students with 60 teachers (49 full-time equivalent) and 32 non-teaching staff (20 full-time equivalent). It includes a special education program.

There are no secondary schools in Buddina. The nearest government secondary schools are Mountain Creek State High School in Mountain Creek to the west and Kawana Waters State College in Bokarina to the south.

== Amenities ==
A notable feature of Buddina is the Kawana Shoppingworld shopping centre, which is one of the largest shopping centres on the Sunshine Coast and includes Big W, Woolworths, Coles, Aldi and over 150 specialty stores.

The Sunshine Coast Regional Council operates the Kawana public library at 30 Nanyima Street.
