= Mooloolaba Triathlon =

The Mooloolaba Triathlon is an annual triathlon held since 1993 in Mooloolaba, Queensland, Australia. It is reported to attract up to 4,000 competitors and includes open-water swimming, cycling, and running. USM EVENTS (now World Triathlon Corporation) owns and manages the Mooloolaba Triathlon Festival. The Mooloolaba Triathlon is the second-largest Olympic distance triathlon event in Australia.

The Mooloolaba Triathlon is the centerpiece of a three-day multi-sport festival. The festival includes events for both elite and beginning athletes, including the Age Group Triathlon, Asics Twilight 5-kilometer (3.1-mile) Run, the Peregian Springs Mooloolaba Ocean Swim, and for children, the Courier-Mail Mooloolaba Superkidz Triathlon.

Also staged in conjunction with the festival is the International Triathlon Union Mooloolaba Triathlon World Cup, the only Australian leg of the ITU Triathlon World Cup Series. As the first race of the season, the World Cup event consistently draws thousands of spectators and a talented international field. In 2011, the world’s top triathletes raced for a prize pool totaling US $100,000.

In 2013, the swim leg of the race was moved to the Mooloolah River for safety reasons after Tropical Cyclone Sandra created huge swells.

== ITU men ==
Year	Winner	Country	Time	Notes
2016	Mario Mola	Spain	52:55	Sprint distance race
2015	David Hauss	France	55:22	Sprint distance race
2014	Mario Mola	Spain	54:18	Sprint distance race
2013	Javier Gómez	Spain	1:54:32	
2012	Peter Kerr	Australia	1:49:29	
2011	Mitchell Robins	Australia	1:51:45	
2010	Brad Kahlefeldt	Australia	1:51:31	
2009	Courtney Atkinson	Australia	1:52:05	
2008	Javier Gómez	Spain	1:49:50	
2007	Brad Kahlefeldt	Australia	1:49:22	

== ITU women ==
Year	Winner	Country	Time	Notes
2016	Jodie Stimpson	(United Kingdom) Great Britain	58:31	Sprint distance race
2015	Tamara Gómez Garrido	Spain	1:01:42	Sprint distance race
2014	Gwen Jorgensen	United States	59:55	Sprint distance race
2013	Anne Haug	Germany	2:04:31	
2012	Sarah Deuble	Australia	2:02:52	
2011	Ashleigh Gentle	Australia	2:03:25	
2010	Vendula Frintová	Czech Republic	2:03:15	
2009	Kirsten Sweetland	Canada	2:01:59	
2008	Emma Snowsill	Australia	2:00:44	
2007	Emma Snowsill	Australia	1:59:20	

== See also ==
- Sport in Queensland
