= Kawana Waters State College =

Public school in Sunshine Coast, Queensland, Australia

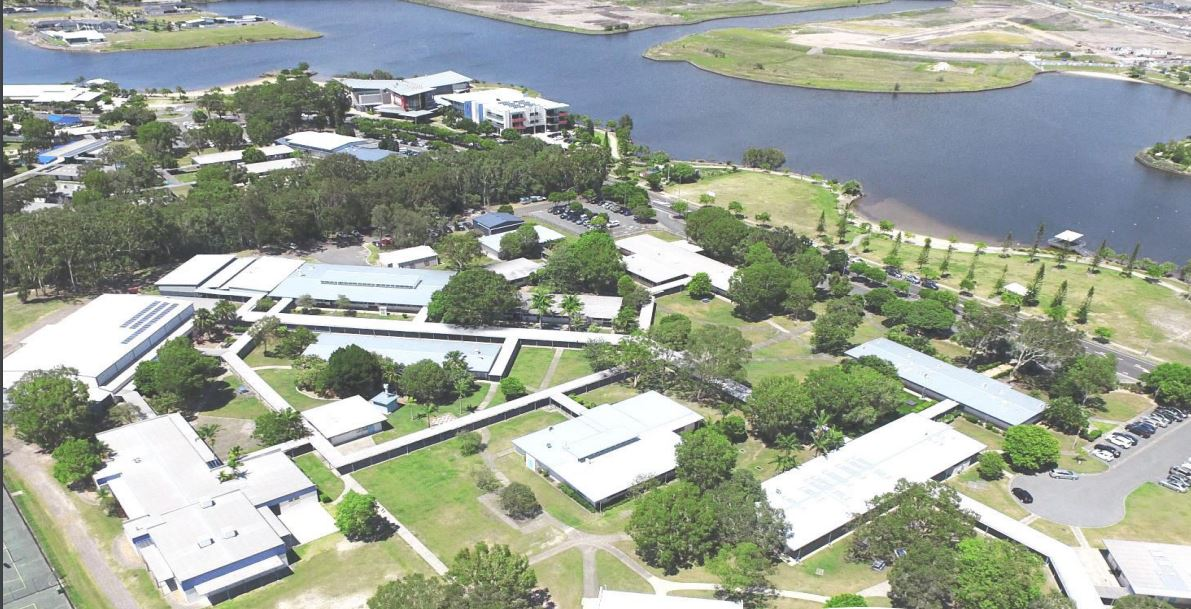

Location
- 119 Sportsman Parade; Bokarina, Queensland, 4575; Australia; 26°44′15.12″S 153°07′32.8″E

Information
- Type: State secondary day school
- Motto: Respect, Excellence, Diversity, Enjoyment
- Religious affiliation: Non-denominational
- Established: 1986
- Authority: Department of Education (Queensland)
- Executive Principal: Brett Burgess
- Principal: Elly Gerbo; Allison Bye
- Deputy Principals: Brett Allan (Secondary campus); Anne Allen (Secondary campus); Cloe Brown (Secondary campus); Amy Ferrington (Secondary campus); Dave Mayfield (Secondary Campus); Lise Carroll (Primary campus); Steve Olson (P-12 Special education)
- Staff: 166 (Teaching); 69 (Non-Teaching)
- Year levels: Prep Year – Year 12
- Gender: Coeducational
- Enrolment: 2,109 (August 2023)
- Capacity: 1,863
- Houses: Coral; Pacific; Tasman
- Colours: Blue; Black; White
- Website: kawanawaterssc.eq.edu.au

Kawana Waters State College is a coeducational state-run primary/secondary school in the suburb of Bokarina (Queensland, Australia). The college is situated on the coastal strip between Mooloolaba and Caloundra, adjacent to Lake Kawana, on the Sunshine Coast, approximately 100 km north of Brisbane.

== History ==
The senior campus of the school was opened on 28 January 1986 as Kawana Waters State High School, whilst the junior campus of the school was opened a year later on 27 January 1987. Effective from 1 January 2006, it merged with Bokarina State School, which was built in 1987, creating the P – 12 state school in its current form. The school still exists in it original campus buildings.

== Nomenclature ==
The school is named after Kawana Waters, an urban centre on the Queensland Sunshine Coast on which the school is located. In the 1960s, Alfred Grant, one of the initial developers of the region, named the area after "Kawana", an Aboriginal word, of unidentified dialect, meaning "wild flowers".

Kawana Waters State High School was chosen as the college's post-amalgamation name through an extensive community consultation process before being approved by Rod Welford as Minister for Education. The name was launched by Chris Cummins (Local Minister) at the 2006 Kawana Festival.

== Administration ==
=== Staff ===
As of 2024, the school has a teaching staff of 165 (Full Time Equivalent: 153) and a non-teaching staff of 70 (Full Time Equivalent: 52).

=== Principals ===
The current executive principal is Brett Burgess (2022–present), who took over from Colin Allen-Waters. Some of the most recent principals have been:

Timeline of principals
Principal	Start	Official appointment ^{†}	Finish
Brett Andrew Burgess	2021	18 January 2024.	present
Colin Allen-Waters	2015	11 May 2015	2021
Paul Bradley Williamson	2010	1 January 2011	2015
John Lockhart	2009	1 January 2010	2010
Joanne Elizabeth House ^{‡}	2006	3 July 2006	2008

† - The date in which the appointment was converted from an acting role to an official appointment.
‡ - Before 3 July 2006, House was the principal of Kawana Waters Senior Campus.

== Students ==
=== Years ===
In 1986, the college, as Kawana Waters State High School, provided services for years 7 to 12. In 2006, it merged with Bokarina State School, a school which provided services for primary to year 7. This produced the school in its current form, teaching the initial prep year to year 12 (P-12).

=== Student enrolments ===
In 2023, Kawana Waters State College was reported to have a maximum student enrolment capacity of 1,863 students. The number of students entering Prep in any given year must not exceed 75 in 3 classrooms, unless there are more than 75 students enrolling from within the catchment area.

The school's Programs of Excellence has the capacity to enrol:

- 104 students in the Arts Excellence Program of Excellence;
- 140 students in the Football Excellence Program of Excellence;
- 190 students in the Academic Curriculum Extension Program of Excellence;
- 198 students in the Aquatics Excellence Program of Excellence.

The trend in student enrolment has been:

Trends in student enrolment
Year	Years													Boys	Girls	Total	Ref
Year	Prep	1	2	3	4	5	6	7	8	9	10	11	12	Boys	Girls	Total	Ref
2005	50	50	64	42	45	56	77	62	186	203	186	192	155	-	-	1,344	
2008	23	57	42	53	69	50	64	75	213	210	211	200	153	-	-	1,420	
2010	-	-	-	-	-	-	-	-	-	-	-	-	-	712	609	1,321	
2011	-	-	-	-	-	-	-	-	-	-	-	-	-	705	628	1,333	
2012	-	-	-	-	-	-	-	-	-	-	-	-	-	732	628	1,360	
2013	-	-	-	-	-	-	-	-	-	-	-	-	-	720	618	1,338	
2014	-	-	-	-	-	-	-	-	-	-	-	-	-	776	705	1,481	
2015	-	-	-	-	-	-	-	-	-	-	-	-	-	813	725	1,538	
2016	-	-	-	-	-	-	-	-	-	-	-	-	-	817	707	1,524	
2017	-	-	-	-	-	-	-	-	-	-	-	-	-	835	721	1,556	
2018	61	77	58	68	79	72	74	213	207	172	206	160	167	833	781	1,614	
2019	75	67	70	59	68	78	73	185	227	219	175	249	116	830	831	1,661	
2020	59	77	66	73	66	83	81	207	196	232	210	238	200	862	926	1,788	
2021	71	59	77	63	83	70	87	231	215	195	241	291	186	896	973	1,869	
2022	59	77	66	73	66	83	81	207	196	232	210	238	200	895	1,038	1,933	
2023	73	57	80	62	86	78	96	249	256	224	316	281	251	999	1,110	2,109	
2024	62	74	65	78	64	89	90	236	256	263	399	368	205	1,065	1,184	2,249	
2025	TBA	TBA	TBA	TBA	TBA	TBA	TBA	TBA	TBA	TBA	TBA	TBA	TBA	1,156	1,339	2,495	
2026	TBA	TBA	TBA	TBA	TBA	TBA	TBA	TBA	TBA	TBA	TBA	TBA	TBA	TBA	TBA	TBA	

== Sports ==
=== Football Excellence Program ===
The Football Excellence Program was established in 1999. This school was funded by fees, sport's organisation sponsorship and government grants. The football Excellence Program provided an opportunity for players to further develop their football and futsal skills, while working through theory elements of skill acquisition and game training based on the Australian Curriculum. The program has an annual "Outstanding Player of the Year" award.

=== External facilities ===
The college is set between the Pacific Ocean and the world class sports and rowing precincts of Sunshine Coast Stadium, Kawana Aquatics Centre and Lake Kawana. Sport related events for the school are held in the adjacent areas of Wurtulla Beach and Lake Kawana.

== Infrastructure ==
=== Environmental footprint ===
Trends in class size
year	Electricity usage	Water usage	Ref
year	kW	kL	Ref
2008–2009	499,289	32,745	
2009–2010	457,263	26,604	
2010–2011	405,355	3,637	
2011–2012	408,203	4,450	
2012–2013	401,613	6,200	
2013–2014	404,348	3,707	
2014–2015	433,865	4,378	

== Cultural diversity ==
=== Indigenous ===
The school is located on the traditional Country of the Undumbi people, a coastal subgroup of the broader Kabi Kabi (Gubbi Gubbi) tribal nation.

=== Multiculturalism ===
The recent trends in multicultural composition been:

Student enrolment trends
Year	Indigenous	LBOTE	Ref
2014	5%	6%	
2015	5%	7%	
2016	5%	9%	
2017	4%	9%	
2018	4%	10%	
2019	4%	10%	
2020	6%	7%	
2021	6%	7%	
2022	6%	9%	
2023	7%	9%	
2024	6%	10%	
2025	TBA	TBA	

== Sports ==
=== Houses ===
The school's five sports houses are named after bodies of water around Australia:

Sports houses
House name	Body of water	Mascot	Colour	Ref
Coral	Coral Sea	Stingray	Red	
Pacific	Pacific Ocean	Swordfish	Blue	
Tasman	Tasman Sea	Sharks	Yellow	

== Voting booth venue ==
The school has been a venue for various state elections and referendums, hosted in the school's "Innovation Hall", including:

Election event details
Date	Event	District	Booth name	Ref
17 May 2025	Federal election	Fisher	Kawana Waters	
26 October 2024	State election	Kawana	Kawana Waters	
16 March 2024	Council elections	Sunshine Coast Region - Division 3	Kawana Waters	
14 October 2023	National referendum	Fisher	Kawana Waters	
21 May 2022	Federal election	Fisher	Kawana Waters	
31 October 2020	State election	Caloundra	Kawana Waters	
18 May 2019	Federal election	Fisher	Kawana Waters	
2 July 2016	Federal election	Fisher	Kawana Waters	
19 March 2016	State referendum	Kawana	Kawana Waters	
31 January 2015	State election	Caloundra	Kawana Waters	
21 August 2010	Federal election	Fisher	Kawana Waters	
9 September 2006	State elections	Kawana	Kawana Waters	

== Alumni ==
Name	Achievement	Ref
Emmanuel Byrd ("Manny")	Football Player (Sydney FC and International)	

== See also ==
- List of schools in Sunshine Coast, Queensland
- Education in Queensland
- Queensland state schools
- History of state education in Queensland
- List of schools in Queensland
- Lists of schools in Australia
