= Electoral district of Kawana =

State electoral district of Queensland, Australia

Kawana Queensland—Legislative Assembly
- Map of the electoral district of Kawana, 2017
- State: Queensland
- Dates current: 2001–present
- MP: Jarrod Bleijie
- Party: Liberal National
- Namesake: Kawana Waters
- Electors: 36,772 (2020)
- Area: 47 km^{2} (18.1 sq mi)
- Demographic: Provincial
- Coordinates: 26°44′S 153°5′E
Electorates around Kawana:
Buderim	Maroochydore	Coral Sea
Caloundra	Kawana	Coral Sea
Caloundra	Caloundra	Coral Sea

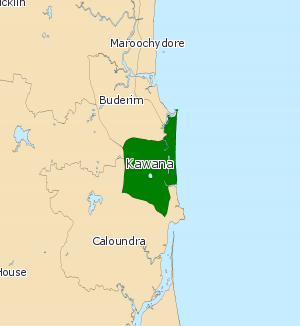
2008 map

Kawana is an electoral district of the Legislative Assembly in the Australian state of Queensland. Based on the Sunshine Coast, the district has been held by both sides of politics over its short history.

== Geography ==
A coastal urban electorate lying to the east of the Bruce Highway, Kawana includes the suburbs of Kawana Waters, Sippy Downs, Minyama, Buddina, Parrearra, Warana, Bokarina and Birtinya. It also includes Aroona, Little Mountain, Wurtulla and parts of Currimundi and Caloundra West, all of which were added to the district at the redistribution ahead of the 2009 state election.

Originally the district stretched further north and west to include the suburbs of Buderim, Mountain Creek and Tanawha. However, these parts were redistributed into the new district of Buderim by the aforementioned redistribution.

== History ==
First created for the 2001 state election, Kawana essentially replaced the abolished district of Mooloolah. The sitting member for Mooloolah, Bruce Laming of the Liberal Party, contested the seat, but was defeated by Chris Cummins of the Labor Party, who subsequently retained the seat at the 2004 state election. Cummins became a minister in the government of Peter Beattie before losing his seat to Liberal Party candidate Steve Dickson at the 2006 state election. Dickson transferred to the new seat of Buderim at the 2009 state election and was succeeded by Liberal National candidate Jarrod Bleijie.

== Members for Kawana ==
Member	Party	Term
Chris Cummins	Labor	2001–2006
Steve Dickson	Liberal	2006–2008
Steve Dickson	Liberal National	2008–2009
Jarrod Bleijie	Liberal National	2009–present

== Election results ==
2024 Queensland state election: Kawana
Party	Candidate	Votes	%	±%
Liberal National	Jarrod Bleijie	19,036	55.56	+4.72
Labor	Jim Dawson	9,717	28.36	−2.60
Greens	Ian Simons	3,263	9.52	+0.19
One Nation	Peter Hinton	2,247	6.56	+0.50
Total formal votes		34,263	96.54	−0.30
Informal votes		1,229	3.46	+0.30
Turnout		35,492	88.62	−0.59
Two-party-preferred result
Liberal National	Jarrod Bleijie	21,489	62.72	+3.41
Labor	Jim Dawson	12,774	37.28	−3.41
Liberal National hold		Swing	+3.41	

Primary vote results in Kawana (Parties that have never gotten 5% of the vote are omitted)
Liberal/Liberal National
Labor
Greens
One Nation
Katter's Australian
Palmer United/United Australia Party
Independent
View source data.
Two-party-preferred vote vote results in Kawana View source data.
