= Sunshine Coast Stadium =

Sports venue in Bokarina, Queensland, Australia

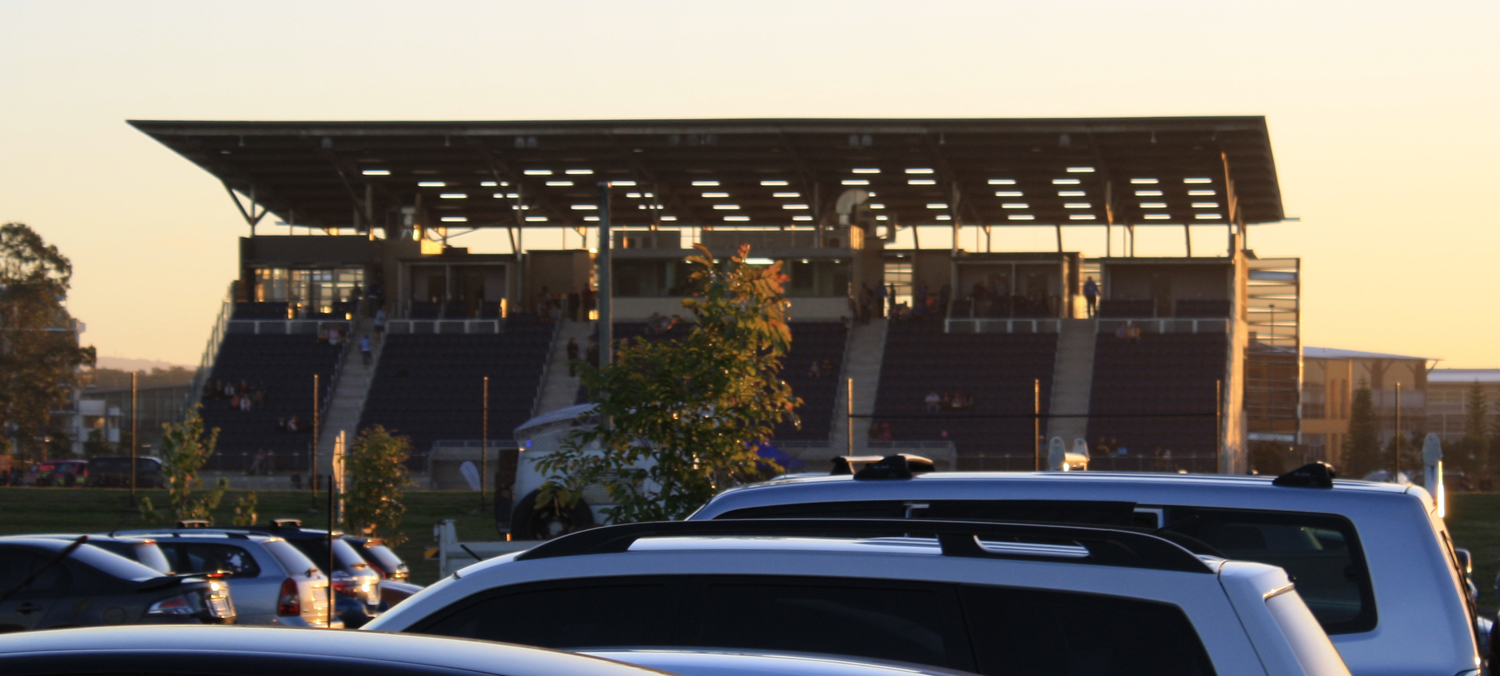
- Interactive map of Sunshine Coast Stadium
- Location: Bokarina, Queensland, Australia
- Coordinates: 26°44′2″S 153°7′34″E
- Owner: Queensland Government
- Capacity: 10,000 (2007–2025); 20,000 (2025–present)
- Executive suites: 4
- Surface: Grass
- Scoreboard: Yes, northern end
- Record attendance: 15,000

Construction
- Expanded: 2011, 2017, 2024
- Cost: $10 million (2011 expansion)

Tenants
- Dolphins (NRL) (2023–present); Sunshine Coast Falcons; Sunshine Coast FC; Sunshine Coast Rugby Union; Queensland Country (NRC) (2015–present); Melbourne Storm (NRL) (2020–2021); Brisbane Roar FC (A-League Men) (2025)

Website
- sunshinecoaststadium.com.au

Sunshine Coast Stadium is a multi-sport venue located at Bokarina in the Kawana Waters urban centre on the Sunshine Coast, Queensland, Australia. The stadium is the main venue in a sporting precinct that also includes seven fields.

== Development ==
Sunshine Coast Stadium was first expanded in 2007, at which time it became sponsored as Stockland Park. At the time, there were plans for the construction of a $22 million, 3,700 seat grandstand which would have allowed for the playing of both rectangular and oval based sports. However, following the withdrawal of State Government funds, the project was cancelled and plans were drawn up for a more modest stadium to be built on the site.

Following the cancellation of the earlier plan, a design was drawn up for the construction of a small grandstand on the western side of the main field. Following a construction period that lasted nearly nine months, the grandstand, named the Sunshine Coast Stadium, was opened on 3 June 2011. A main grandstand seating 1,050 spectators under cover is situated on the wing while temporary seating can be placed around the field for rectangular events pushing the seating capacity to 12,000. As part of the focus on sustainability at the stadium, it features a 30 kW solar power system on the stadium's roof.

The venue has hosted national events including a pre-season A-League fixture between the Brisbane Roar and Wellington Phoenix as well as its attendance breaking pre-season NRL match between Manly Sea Eagles and Melbourne Storm, which attracted 8,119 spectators. On 29 October 2011, the stadium hosted a Cold Chisel concert, attracting 15,000 patrons

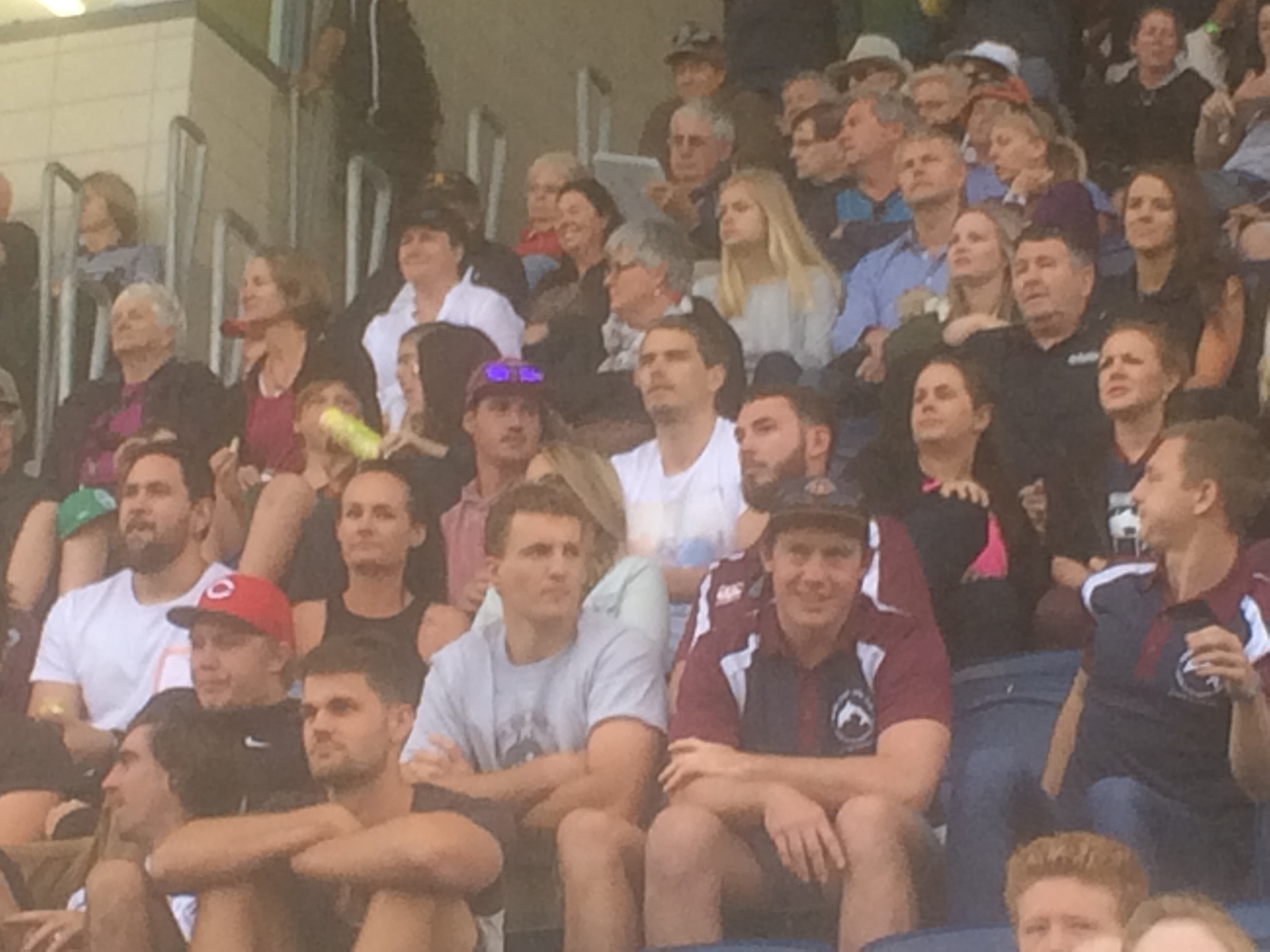
Grand Final Crowd, 2014

In early 2017, a $2.4 million upgrade will be completed. A further 2,500 seats were added bringing the total to 10,000. It opened on 11 February 2017 with a trial match between the Melbourne Storm and New Zealand Warriors.

The record sporting event crowd was set in round 5 of the 2019 NRL season on 13 April 2019 when the South Sydney Rabbitohs beat the New Zealand Warriors in the first ever NRL game on the Sunshine Coast for premiership points in front of 11,912 patrons.

In 2020 the stadium became a temporary home ground for the Melbourne Storm when on 8 July, the club announced that they would play their Round 10, 12 and 13 home fixtures at the Stadium. This was extended on 18 August when the club confirmed their remaining 3 home fixtures, Rounds 16, 18 and 19 would also be played there. The Storm had relocated to the Sunshine Coast in mid June due to the escalation of the COVID-19 pandemic in Victoria, preventing them from playing at AAMI Park in Melbourne. This continued in 2021 when the Storm along with the Panthers, Sea Eagles, Knights and Roosters all relocated home matches to the Stadium to continue the season after multiple state lockdowns occurred in the middle of the year forcing the entire competition to be staged in Queensland. In total, the Sunshine Coast Stadium ended up hosting seven matches in 2021 including the stadium's first ever NRL finals match on September 10 when Melbourne hosted Manly-Warringah.

As part of the Redcliffe Dolphins successful bid for a NRL license in 2021, the club intend to play some of their games at Sunshine Coast Stadium from their entry into the NRL in 2023.

=== Upgrades ===
International standard light towers were erected at the stadium in 2020. In February 2023, the Queensland Government announced an expansion of the stadium to accommodate Football at the 2032 Olympic Games alongside a new indoor sports facility to be built near the ground. A new Eastern stand will be built as well as an expanded Western stand to boost capacity to 16,000 with temporary stands on the Northern and Southern grass hills to boost capacity to 20,000 during the Olympics. Construction on the new stands is to begin in 2024.
