= Sea Life Sunshine Coast =

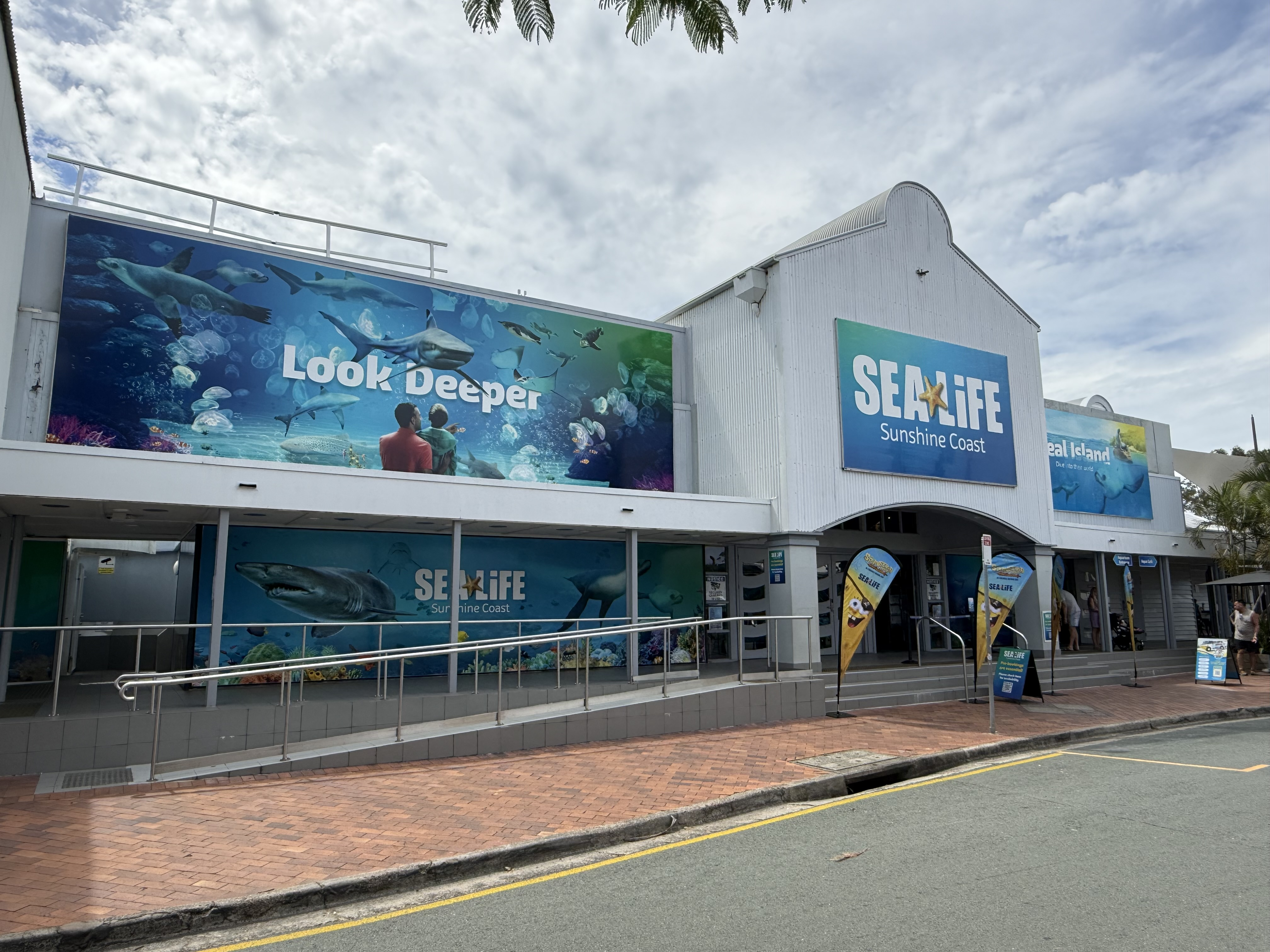
- Entrance to Sea Life Sunshine Coast, 2026
- Interactive map of Sea Life Sunshine Coast
- 26°40′58.25″S 153°07′16.6″E
- Location: Mooloolaba, Sunshine Coast, Queensland, Australia
- Volume of largest tank: 2,500,000 L (660,000 US gal)
- Memberships: ZAA
- Website: www.sealifesunshinecoast.com.au

Sea Life Sunshine Coast (formerly known as UnderWater World) is a marine mammal park, oceanarium and wildlife sanctuary at Mooloolaba, Sunshine Coast, Queensland, Australia. Sea Life Sunshine Coast is an institutional member of the Zoo and Aquarium Association (ZAA). The attraction is a Sea Life Centre owned by Merlin Entertainments, and is globally referred to as Sea Life Sunshine Coast by the firm.

== History ==
Sea Life Sunshine Coast officially opened in 1989.

Several scenes in the Jackie Chan 1996 film Police Story 4: First Strike were shot in the park, including a scene in the main aquarium. In one of the scenes, a tourist family is visible in the reflection on one of the tanks.

Between late 2006 and May 2008, UnderWater World had a giant squid preserved in a block of ice on display.

In July 2013, UnderWater World's owners, Merlin Entertainments, announced that they would be spending $6.5 million on the refurbishment of the facilities. As part of the process, the aquarium was rebranded as a Sea Life Centre and relaunched in December 2013.

== Exhibits ==
Some examples of the largest exhibits at the aquarium include:

Ocean Tunnel

There was a moving walkway in an 80-metre (260 ft) shark tunnel under the 2,500,000-litre (660,000 US gal) oceanariumwhich took visitors past several viewing windows, with fish swimming all around the walkway. This is now a carpeted walkway without the travelator. The exhibit includes three separate habitats: coral reef, cave and open ocean. Its residents include grey nurse sharks, tawny nurse sharks, grey reef sharks, whitetip reef sharks, blacktip reef sharks, leopard sharks, ornate wobbegongs, rays, giant groupers, potato cods, snappers and trevallies. One resident, a brown whipray has lived at the aquarium since 1989.

In November 2011, the shark tank and moving walkway were closed for an upgrade.

Seal Island

There are six seals at Sea Life Sunshine Coast: Long-nosed fur seals Birubi, Moana, Saturday and Sly; Subantarctic fur seal Nelson and Australian sea lion Teiko, who are the residents of the main Seal Island exhibit.

== Shows and talks ==
Sea Life Sunshine Coast presents seal shows and wildlife information talks, and has hands-on marine displays. Shows at the park include:

- Seal Shows in the Seal Stadium
- Stingray Reef talks
- Ocean Tunnel Tours
- Touch Pool
- Jellyfish Tours
- Behind the Scenes Tours

== Conservation ==
Sea Life Sunshine Coast is a rehabilitation centre for turtles, seals, and other marine animals.
