= Kawana Waters, Queensland =

Kawana Waters
- Town
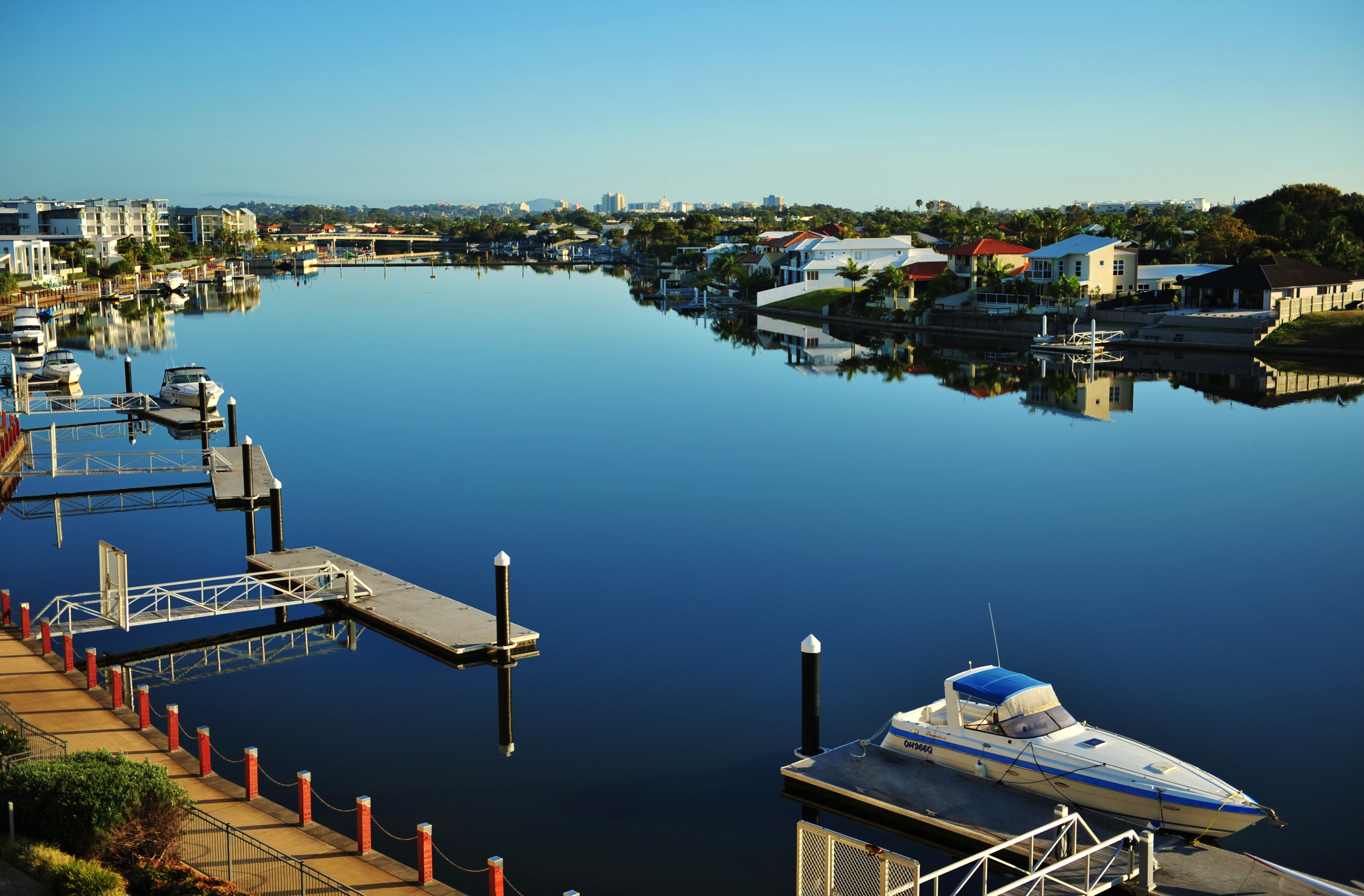
- View over the canal, 2011

- Interactive map of Kawana Waters
- Coordinates: 26.733°S 153.1333°E
- Country: Australia
- State: Queensland
- City: Sunshine Coast
- LGA: Sunshine Coast Region
- Location: 9.5 km (5.9 mi) N of Caloundra; 11.6 km (7.2 mi) SSE of Maroochydore; 95 km (59 mi) N of Brisbane
- Established: 1970s

Government
  - State electorate: Kawana
  - Federal division: Fisher
- Time zone: UTC+10:00 (AEST)
- Postcode: 4575

Kawana Waters is an urban centre on the Sunshine Coast in Queensland, Australia, between Caloundra and Maroochydore along the Coral Sea coast. It was originally the estate development name and has passed into common usage, but it is not officially a town nor a locality. The official suburbs (listed below) are connected by the Nicklin Way arterial road. It is sometimes abbreviated to Kawana, which is a suburb of Rockhampton.

Many shopping and sporting facilities, including Kawana Shoppingworld are located in the Kawana Waters estate area.

== Geography ==
Kawana Waters is a narrow urban area bounded roughly by Mooloolah River to the north and northwest, the ocean to the east and Currimundi Lake to the south.

The Kawana Waters urban centre consists of the following suburbs:

- Birtinya
- Bokarina
- Buddina
- Minyama
- Parrearra
- Warana
- Wurtulla

== History ==
According to Rex Ingamells, Kawana is an Aboriginal word meaning wildflowers. Construction work on Kawana Island commenced in 1960, with Nicklin Way officially opened in 1965. The area was officially named Kawana Waters on 1 November 1968, having previously been known as Kawana Island.

Earthmoving activities conducted during the development of the area uncovered more than 100 pieces of unexploded ordnance between 1970 and 1995. They were remnants of World War II live-fire training exercises.

According to primary agreements and documents, Kawana Waters introduced a new master planning framework in 1996 for the long-term development of nearby suburbs.

Along with a number of other regional Australian newspapers owned by News Corp Australia, the Kawana/Maroochy Weekly newspaper ceased publication in June 2020.

== Transport ==
The suburbs within the Kawana Waters estate area are served by Kinetic Sunshine Coast, who operate a bus interchange at Kawana Shoppingworld. Bus routes 600–619 connect Kawana Waters with Caloundra, Maroochydore, Buderim, Landsborough and Nambour.

Landsborough and Nambour stations on the North Coast line offer regular services to Brisbane, operated by Queensland Rail. There are also coach services from Kawana Waters to Brisbane Airport.

== Population ==
Census populations for the Kawana Statistical Local Area have been recorded since 1981 but covers more than just the area known as the Kawana Waters estate:

| Year | Population |
|---|---|
| 1981 | 5,261 |
| 1986 | 9,265 |
| 1991 | 14,393 |
| 1996 | 16,389 |
| 2001 | 17,041 |
| 2006 | 20,319 |
| 2011 | 22,593 |
