= Birtinya, Queensland =

Birtinya
- Suburb
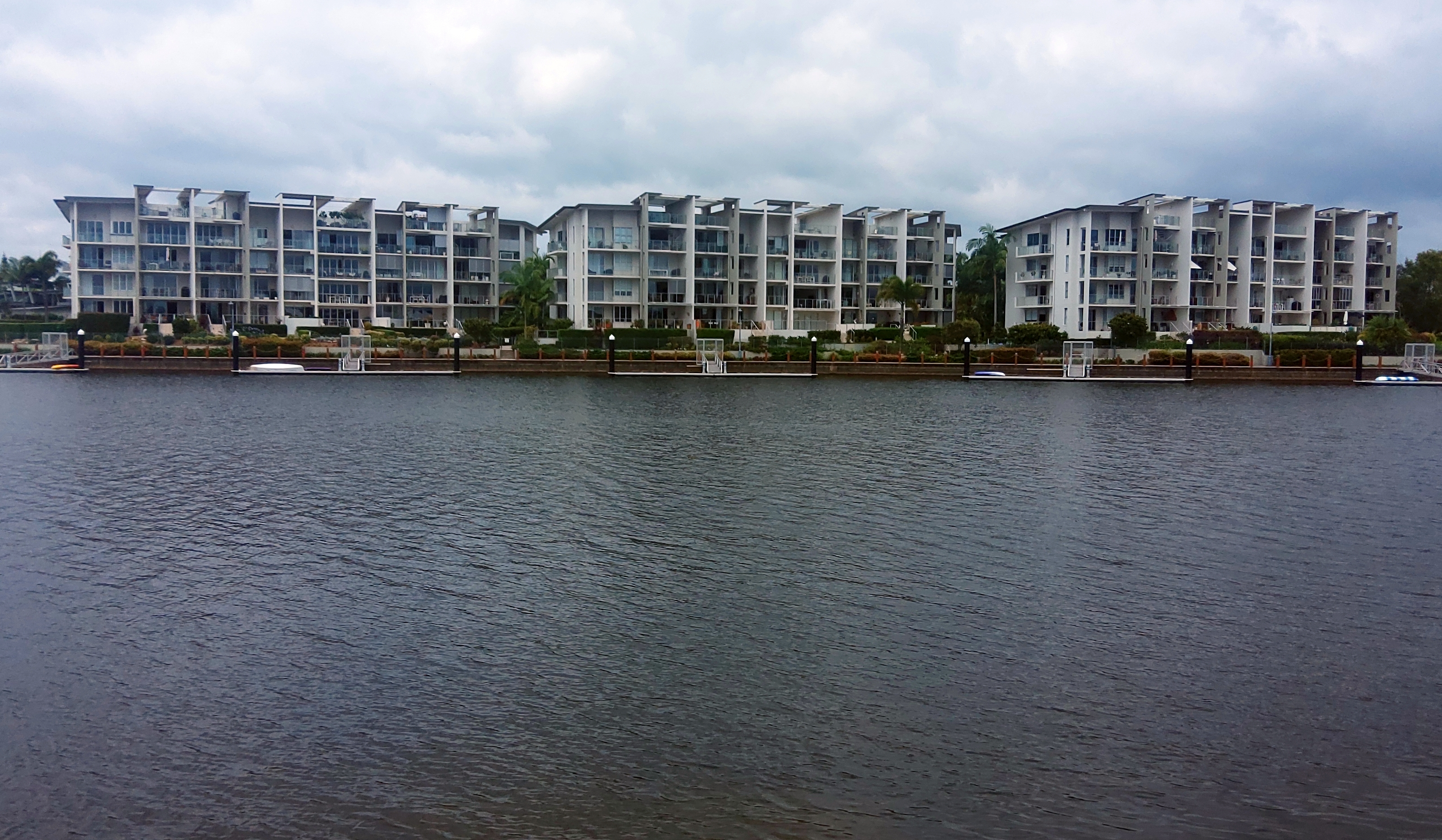
- Apartment buildings on Lake Kawana, 2021

- Interactive map of Birtinya
- Coordinates: 26.7452°S 153.1158°E
- Country: Australia
- State: Queensland
- City: Kawana Waters
- LGA: Sunshine Coast Region
- Location: 8.3 km (5.2 mi) N of Caloundra CBD; 13.9 km (8.6 mi) SSE of Maroochydore; 92.6 km (57.5 mi) N of Brisbane

Government
  - State electorate: Kawana
  - Federal division: Fisher

Area
  - Total: 5.3 km^{2} (2.0 sq mi)

Population
  - Total: 4,378 (2021 census)
  - Density: 826/km^{2} (2,139/sq mi)
- Time zone: UTC+10:00 (AEST)
- Postcode: 4575
- County: Canning
- Parish: Bribie
Suburbs around Birtinya
Sippy Downs	Warana	Warana
Palmview	Birtinya	Bokarina
Meridan Plains	Currimundi	Wurtulla

Birtinya is a suburb of Kawana Waters in the Sunshine Coast Region, Queensland, Australia. In the 2021 census, Birtinya had a population of 4,378 people.

== Geography ==
The suburb is a canal estate. The artificial Lake Kawana lies in the east of the locality, with a number of canals extending westward from it and creating a large central island. The west of the suburb remains as a wetland.

The main road access to the suburb is Lake Kawana Boulevard. It connects with Nicklin Way in neighbouring Bokarina to the east and runs west over the lake, across the central island to a junction with Kawana Way.

== History ==
The name Birtinya was proposed in March 1960 by the developer, Alfred Grant Pty Ltd., and was supposedly an Aboriginal word meaning neighbouring, but the specific language and dialect remains unknown.

Pacific Lutheran College opened on 26 September 2001; it is now within the boundaries of neighbouring Meridan Plains.

== Demographics ==
In the 2011 census, Birtinya had a population of 314 people. The 2016 census recorded a population of 1,933 people, and that had increased to 4,378 people by the 2021 census.

== Education ==
There are no schools in Birtinya. The nearest government primary and secondary school is Kawana Waters State College in neighbouring Bokarina, to the east.

== Amenities ==
Birtinya is built around Lake Kawana, which includes a 2-kilometre (1.2 mi) buoyed course for flat water competitions.

The Lake Kawana Community Centre, located beside the lake on Sportsmans Drive (26.74024°S 153.12492°E), provides 15 halls and meeting rooms for community events, together with commercial kitchen facilities and smaller kitchenettes. It is operated by the Sunshine Coast Regional council. The centre was officially opened on 5 November 2005 by City of Caloundra mayor Don Aldous.

Sunshine Coast University Hospital (SCUH) is located in Birtinya. It is a tertiary, teaching hospital serving all parts of the Sunshine Coast and Gympie Region. SCUH saw its first patients on 21 March 2017 and was officially opened on 19 April 2017 by the Queensland Premier and Minister for Health and Minister for Ambulance Services. SCUH opened with about 450 beds, with plans for services and capacity to continue expand over the coming years and the provision of 738 beds by 2021.

Birtinya is scheduled to be the terminus of the Sunshine Coast railway line, with connecting buses, similar to those used for the Brisbane Metro, to transport passengers on to Maroochydore.
