= Mooloolaba =

- Suburb
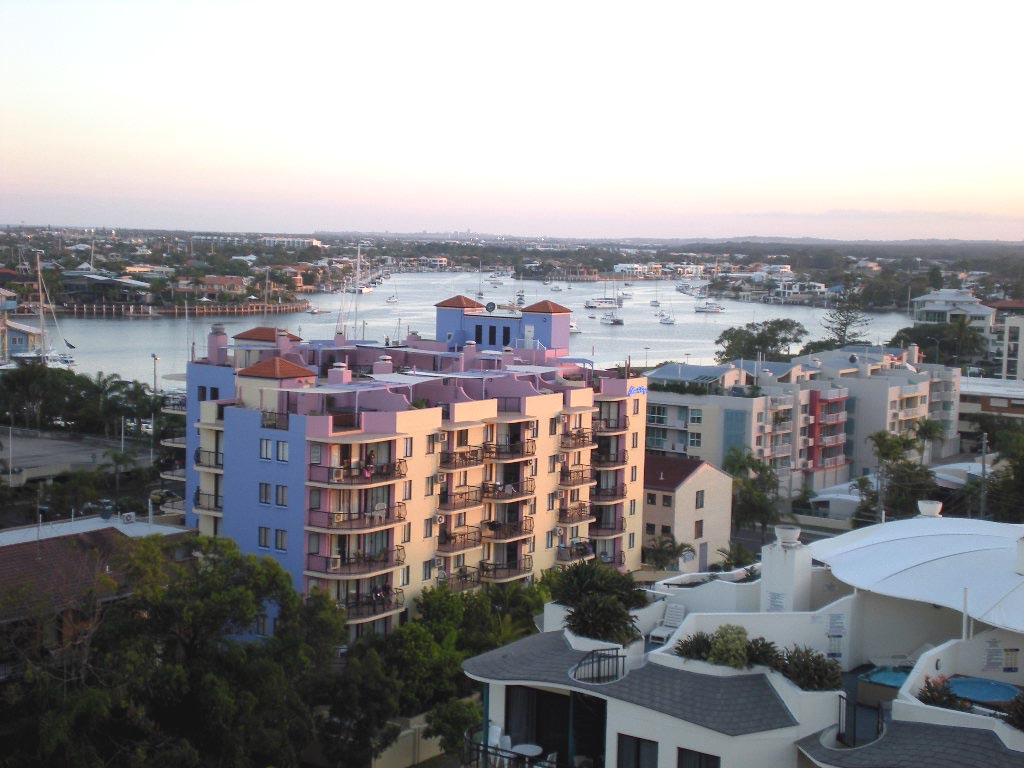
- Apartments, 2008

- Interactive map of Mooloolaba
- Coordinates: 26.6819°S 153.1177°E
- Country: Australia
- State: Queensland
- City: Maroochydore
- LGA: Sunshine Coast Region
- Location: 4.6 km (2.9 mi) SSE of Maroochydore; 97.3 km (60.5 mi) N of Brisbane CBD

Government
  - State electorate: Maroochydore
  - Federal division: Fisher

Area
  - Total: 4.0 km^{2} (1.5 sq mi)

Population
  - Total: 8,202 (2021 census)
  - Density: 2,051/km^{2} (5,310/sq mi)
- Time zone: UTC+10:00 (AEST)
- Postcode: 4557
- County: Canning
- Parish: Mooloolah
Suburbs around Mooloolaba
Alexandra Headland	Coral Sea	Coral Sea
Buderim	Mooloolaba	Buddina
Mountain Creek	Parrearra	Minyama

Mooloolaba is a coastal suburb of Maroochydore in the Sunshine Coast Region, Queensland, Australia. It is part of the Maroochydore urban centre. In the 2021 census, Mooloolaba had a population of 8,202 people.

== Geography ==
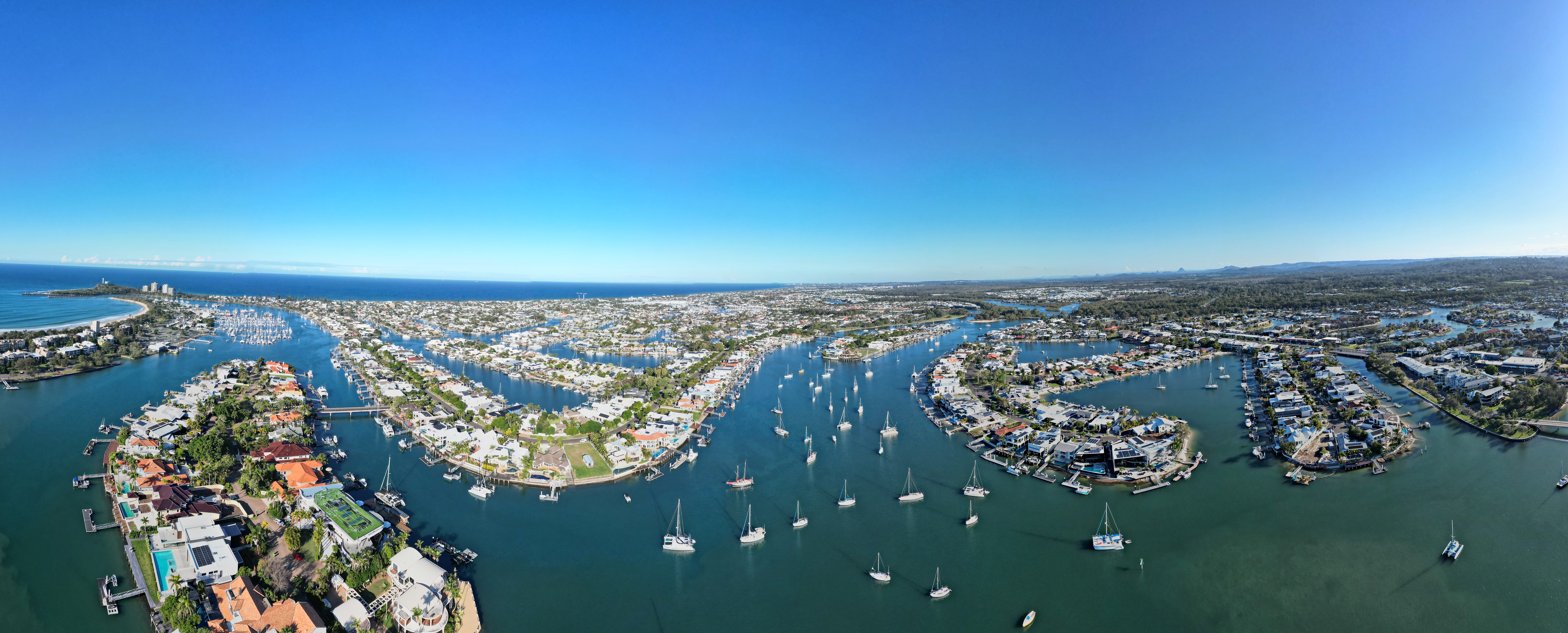
Aerial perspective of Mooloolaba's network of waterways

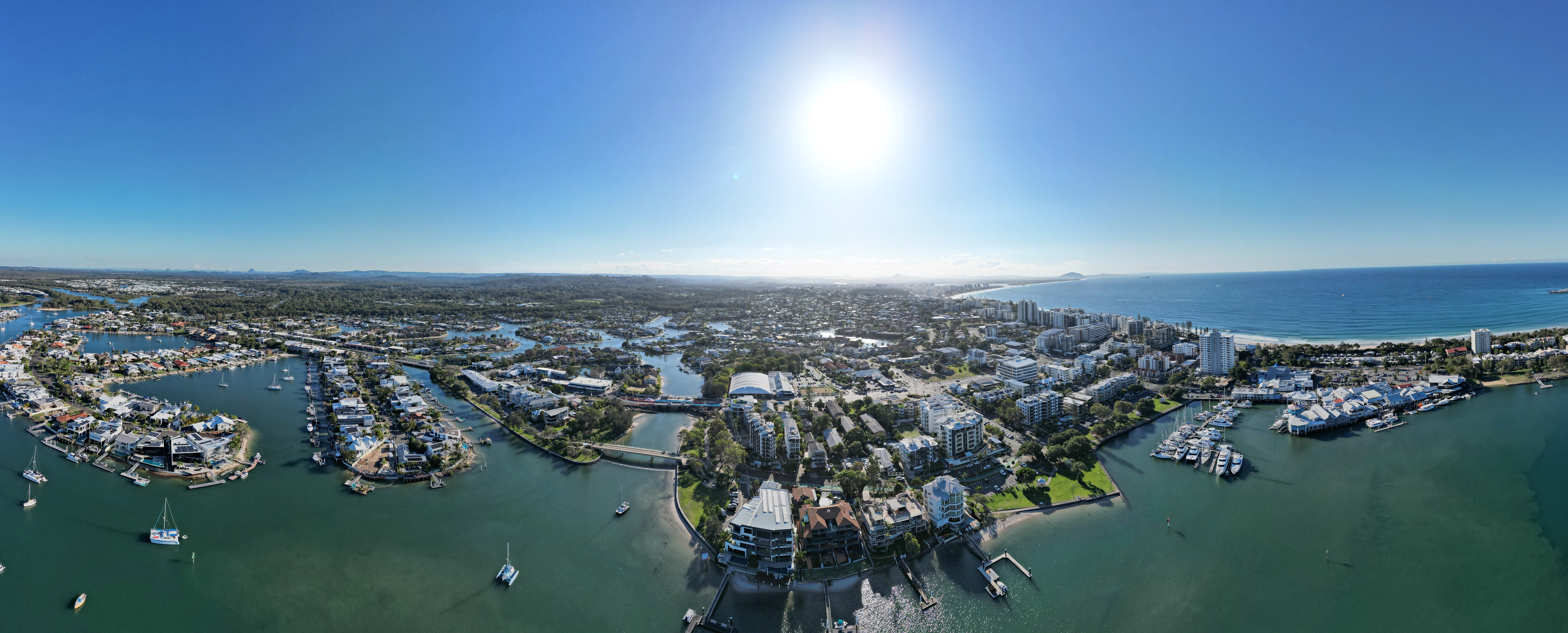
Aerial panorama of Mooloolaba

Mooloolaba is bounded on the east by the Coral Sea, on the south by the Mooloolah River, on the north by Alexandra Headland and to the west by Buderim. Mooloolaba Harbour (near the mouth of the Mooloolah River, 26.6858°S 153.1328°E) is the home of a large fleet of fishing vessels, as well as being the northern base for the pilot vessels that control shipping through Moreton Bay and the Port of Brisbane. Due to its sheltered location in the lee of Point Cartwright, it is an all-weather harbour favoured by recreational sailors.

The esplanade facing Mooloolaba beach is a centre for tourist activity, containing the Sea Life marine park, as well as many souvenir and clothing shops, bookshops, galleries and restaurants. Behind the apartments facing the Mooloolaba Beach (26.6811°S 153.1217°E) are camping grounds, backpacker hostels and canal villas. It is also a tourism destination, with cruise ships regularly anchoring outside the port.

Mooloolaba is serviced by coach from Brisbane, by train and connecting bus via Nambour, Woombye, Landsborough station, and by air from the Sunshine Coast Airport.

== History ==
Mooloolaba derives from the Aboriginal word mulu, meaning snapper fish, or mulla meaning Red-bellied Black Snake. Originally known as Mooloolah Heads, the name was changed to Mooloolaba by Thomas O'Connor in 1919 when he subdivided land for sale there.

Mooloolaba Surf Club was established in December 1922 by a group of individuals from the Mooloolah River Sports Club to oversee beach safety.

A Methodist church hall was opened on Saturday 28 January 1933.

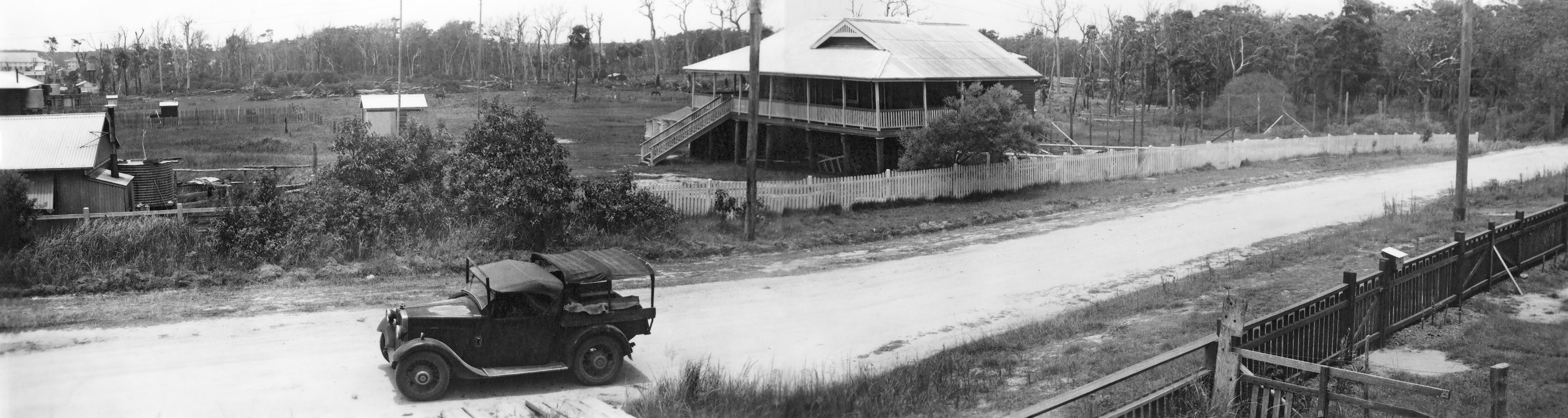
Original school building, Mooloolaba State School, 1949

Mooloolaba Provisional School opened on 2 May 1933. On 24 January 1938, it became Mooloolaba State School. It had less than 50 students in its early years. The original school building remains on the site, but has been extended over the years.

On the weekend of 8-9 December 1934, Prince Henry, Duke of Gloucester visited Mooloolaba where he enjoyed a private weekend including driving a speed boat, surfing, and horse riding.

In September 1954, Archbishop Reginald Halse performed a stump-capping ceremony for the new Anglican church at Mooloolaba. St Elizabeth's Anglican Church was dedicated on 2 November 1954 by Archbishop Halse. Its closure on 2 April 2006 was approved by Venerable R N Gowty, Archdeacon of Wide Bay. The congregation had dwindled to 17 people and a property developer offered a sum for the block in First Avenue (approx 26.6774°S 153.1152°E) described as "safely estimated to be in the millions" to combine the church land with other parcels to build a high-rise residential development. The plan was to combine St Elizabeth's with St Peter's Anglican in Maroochydore and have only one Anglican church in the area.

On 4 December 2007, a memorial statue of the "Crocodile Hunter", Steve Irwin was unveiled to the public in Mooloolaba.

== Demographics ==
In the 2016 census, Mooloolaba had a population of 7,730 people.

In the 2021 census, Mooloolaba had a population of 8,202 people.

== Education ==
Mooloolaba State School is a government primary (Prep–6) school for boys and girls on the corner of Meta and Douglas Streets (26.6784°S 153.1137°E). In 2017, the school had an enrolment of 677 students with 45 teachers (39 full-time equivalent) and 20 non-teaching staff (15 full-time equivalent). In 2018, the school had an enrolment of 703 students with 45 teachers (40 full-time equivalent) and 24 non-teaching staff (17 full-time equivalent). It includes a special education program. The school has a maximum student enrolment capacity of 822 students.

There are no secondary schools in Moloolaba. The nearest government secondary school is Mountain Creek State High School in neighbouring Mountain Creek.

== Amenities ==
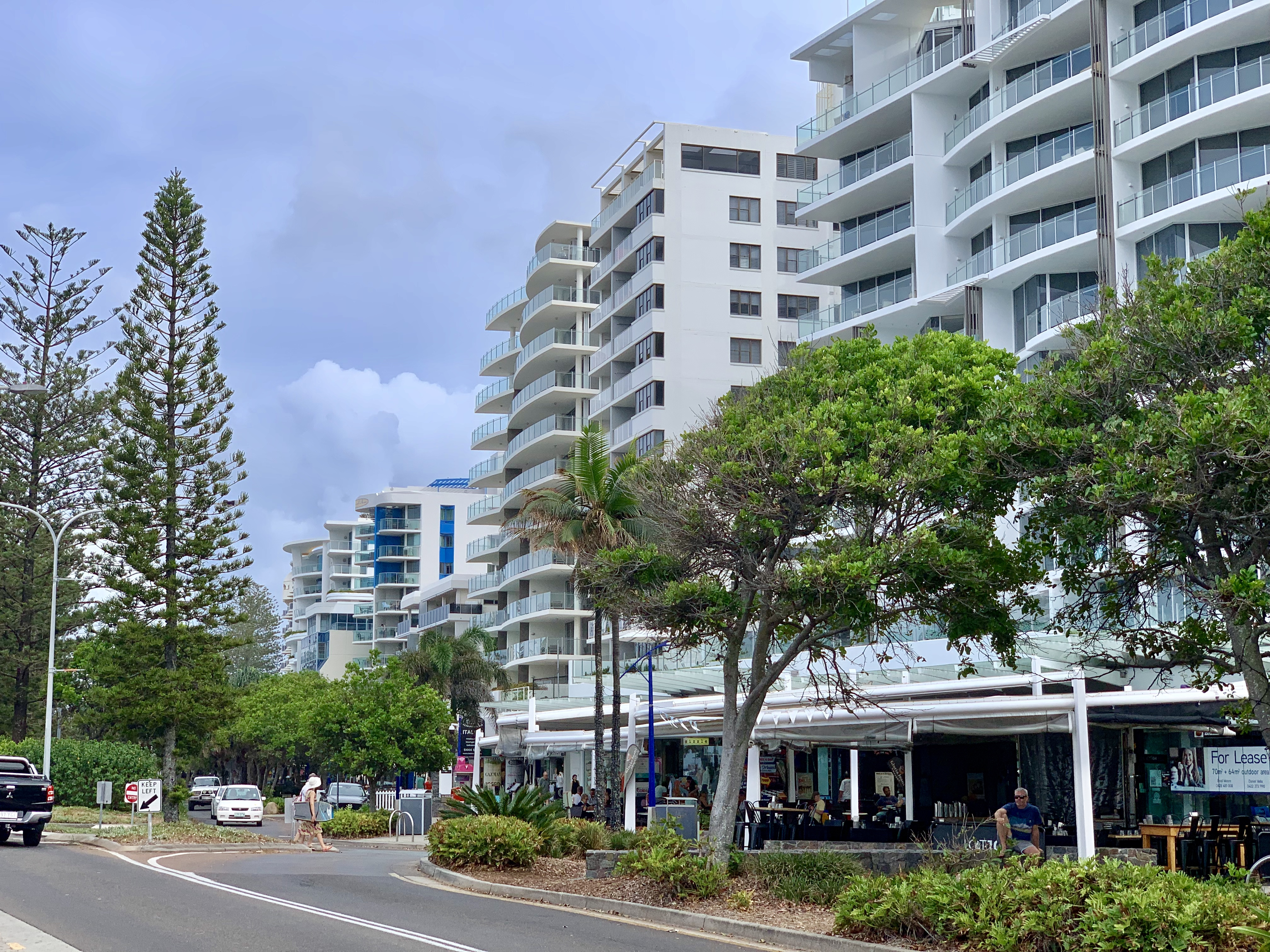
Mooloolaba Esplanade, 2019

The Sunshine Coast Council operates a mobile library service which visits Moondarra Drive.

The Mooloolaba Uniting Church is at 6 Meta Street (26.6771°S 153.1147°E).

The Greek Orthodox Parish of the Sunshine Coast meets at the Uniting Church at 6 Meta Street once a month.

There are two marinas, both on the northern bank of the Mooloolah River accessed from Parklyn Parade:

- The Wharf Marina, a 2.2-hectare (5.4-acre) marina (26.6840°S 153.1210°E.
- Mooloolaba Marina, a 12.1-hectare (30-acre) marina (26.6863°S 153.1301°E)

There are a number of boating facilities providing access to the Mooloolah State Boat Harbour which are managed by the Department of Transport and Main Roads:

- Parkyn Parade Upstream with floating walkway (26.6853°S 153.1265°E)
- Parkyn Parade Downstream with floating walkway (26.6856°S 153.1278°E)
- Parkyn Parade pontoon (between the two boat ramps) (26.6855°S 153.1271°E)

== Events ==
Mooloolaba is also home to the Mooloolaba Triathlon and the Sydney to Mooloolaba Yacht Race. It is also home to various on beach events.

== Attractions ==
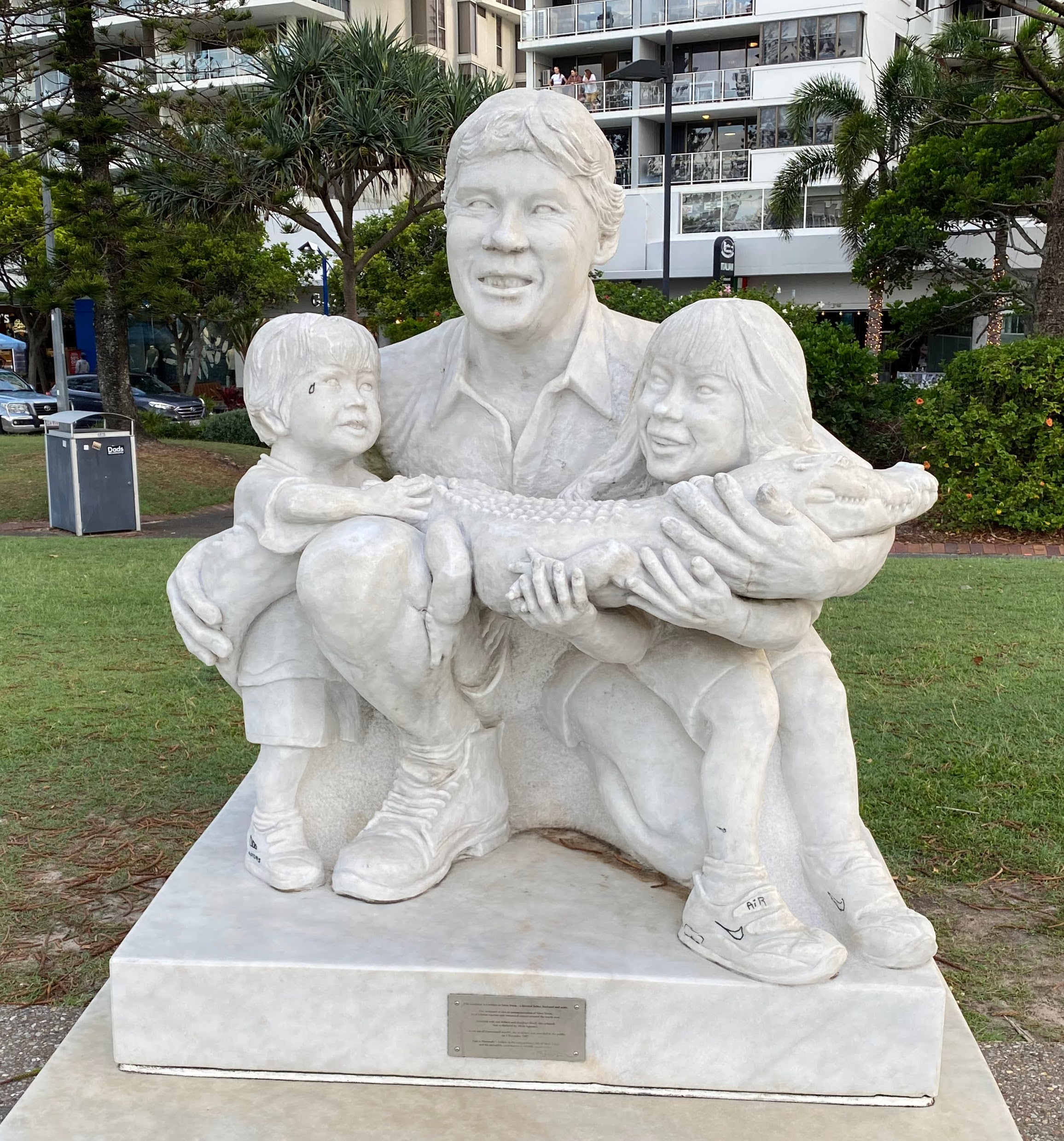
Steve Irwin Memorial, 2023

Sea Life Sunshine Coast is a tourist attraction in Parklyn Parade (26.6837°S 153.1221°E). It is an aquarium and zoo focussing on marine creatures, including sharks, stingrays, jellyfish, seals and penguins. It includes an 80-metre (260 ft) underwater viewing tunnel.

The Steve Irwin memorial is on the Mooloolaba Esplanade 26.6781°N 153.1183°E.

== In popular culture ==
Mooloolaba featured in the fourth season of The Amazing Race. Evangelist Peter Foxhall and Pastor Bill Furler pioneered an Assemblies of God church at the Mooloolaba Surf Lifesaving Club in the mid-1980s. The town was also the home of the Christian pop/rock band Newsboys and is mentioned in their song "RSL 1984" from In the Hands of God. It is the fifth town mentioned in the original Australian version of the song "I've Been Everywhere".

In August and September 2015, the town garnered media attention when a French woman recorded a video claiming to have had a one-night stand with a male resident of Mooloolaba, asking him to come forward. It turned out to have been a promotional advert for the town, masterminded by a British social media expert - the woman was a French university student and actress.

== Notable people ==
- Elliott Hagen, Rugby Union player
