= Wurtulla, Queensland =

Wurtulla
- Suburb
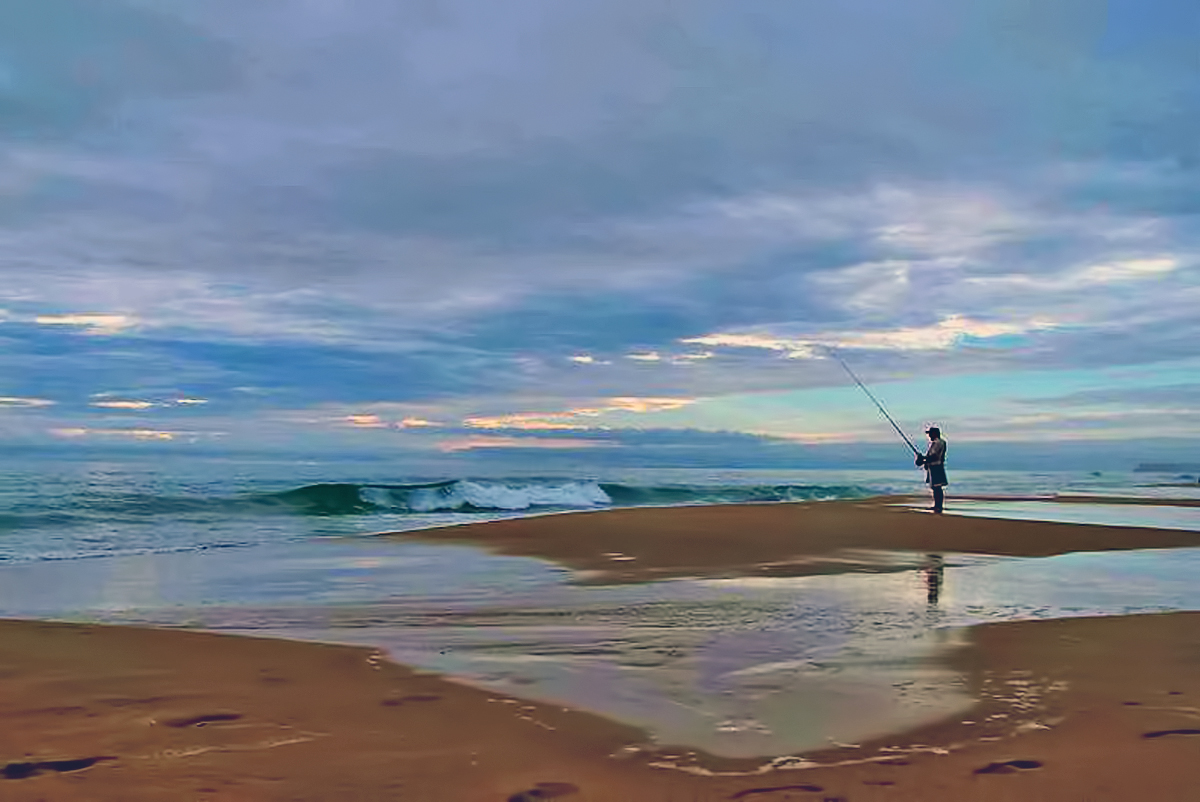
- Fisherman at Dawn, Wurtulla Beach, 2012

- Interactive map of Wurtulla
- Coordinates: 26.7555°S 153.1266°E
- Country: Australia
- State: Queensland
- City: Kawana Waters
- LGA: Sunshine Coast Region
- Location: 7.1 km (4.4 mi) S of Kawana Waters; 6.5 km (4.0 mi) N of Caloundra; 14.4 km (8.9 mi) S of Maroochydore; 97.3 km (60.5 mi) NNE of Brisbane

Government
  - State electorate: Kawana
  - Federal division: Fisher

Area
  - Total: 3.4 km^{2} (1.3 sq mi)

Population
  - Total: 6,254 (2021 census)
  - Density: 1,839/km^{2} (4,760/sq mi)
- Time zone: UTC+10:00 (AEST)
- Postcode: 4575
- County: Canning
- Parish: Bribie
Suburbs around Wurtulla
Birtinya	Bokarina	Coral Sea
Birtinya	Wurtulla	Coral Sea
Currimundi	Currimundi	Coral Sea

Wurtulla is a coastal suburb of Kawana Waters in the Sunshine Coast Region, Queensland, Australia. In the 2021 census, Wurtulla had a population of 6,254 people.

== Geography ==
Wurtulla is located within the Kawana Waters urban centre.

Wurtulla is bounded by the Coral Sea to the east, Currimundi Creek (also known as Currimundi Lake) to the south, Pangali Canal and Lake Kawana to the west and Lake Kawana Boulevarde and Wurley Drive to the north.

The Nicklin Way passes through the suburb from north (Bokarina) to south (Currimundi).

Currimundi Lake (Kathleen McArthur) Conservation Park is a protected area in the south-east of the locality of natural bushland, predominantly the wallum heath that was once commonplace in the coastal areas of South-East Queensland.

== History ==
Wurtulla was originally named as a town by Queensland Place Names Board on 1 September 1967 using a name suggested by the developer Alfred Grant Pty Ltd on 31 March 1960. The name is an Aboriginal word meaning southward. It was gazetted as a suburb and bounded on 8 July 1989.

== Demographics ==
In the 2016 census, Wurtulla had a population of 5,905 people.

In the 2021 census, Wurtulla had a population of 6,254 people.

== Education ==
There are no schools in Wurtulla. The nearest government primary schools are Kawana Waters State College in neighbouring Bokarina to the north and Talara Primary College in neighbouring Currimundi to the south. The nearest government secondary school is Kawana Waters State College in Bokarina.
