= Mitchell Robins =

Australian triathlete (born 1988)

Personal information
- Full name: Mitchell Paul Robins
- Nickname: Mitch,
- Born: 21 June 1988 (age 38) Port Macquarie, New South Wales, Australia
- Height: 1.88 m (6 ft 2 in)
- Weight: 74 kg (163 lb)
- Website: www.mitchrobins.com

Sport
- Country: Australia
- Sport: Triathlon
- Turned pro: 2010
- Coached by: Grant Giles

Mitchell Paul Robins (born 21 June 1988 in Port Macquarie, New South Wales) is an Australian professional triathlete who races primarily non-drafting Olympic distance and long-distance triathlons.

== Career ==
Robins was born and raised in Port Macquarie, NSW, where he grew up participating in a variety of sports. After competing in State and National cross-country championships throughout his early years, Robins was introduced to triathlon by friends competing in Ironman Australia in his hometown of Port Macquarie. He eventually signed up to compete in a team relay at the Port Macquarie Half Ironman in 2007.

Robins competed in his first Triathlon in late 2007 at his local triathlon club in Port Macquarie. 2009 saw Robins finish 2nd at his home race, the Port Macquarie Half Ironman, and followed this up with a win at the same event in 2010. While combining full-time study (Bachelor of Human Movement) at the University of Technology, Sydney, Robins began to compete at the ITU Draft-Legal style of racing at the Mooloolaba Oceania Cup in 2011. A win here earned Robins a spot at the Australian Team Camp in Aix les Bains, France. Robins won his first race in Europe at the Holten ITU Premium European Cup, which gained him a spot on the 2011 Elite Australia Team to compete in the Beijing ITU World Championships, and the short list for the 2012 London Olympic Games.

A foot injury sidelined Robins from April 2012 to November 2014. During this time he completed his University studies. Robins made his return to competition in November 2014 with a win at Challenge Foster. He has since won multiple Ironman 70.3 events and finished on the podium in 88% of all races started since 2014.
