= Mountain Creek, Queensland =

Mountain Creek
- Suburb
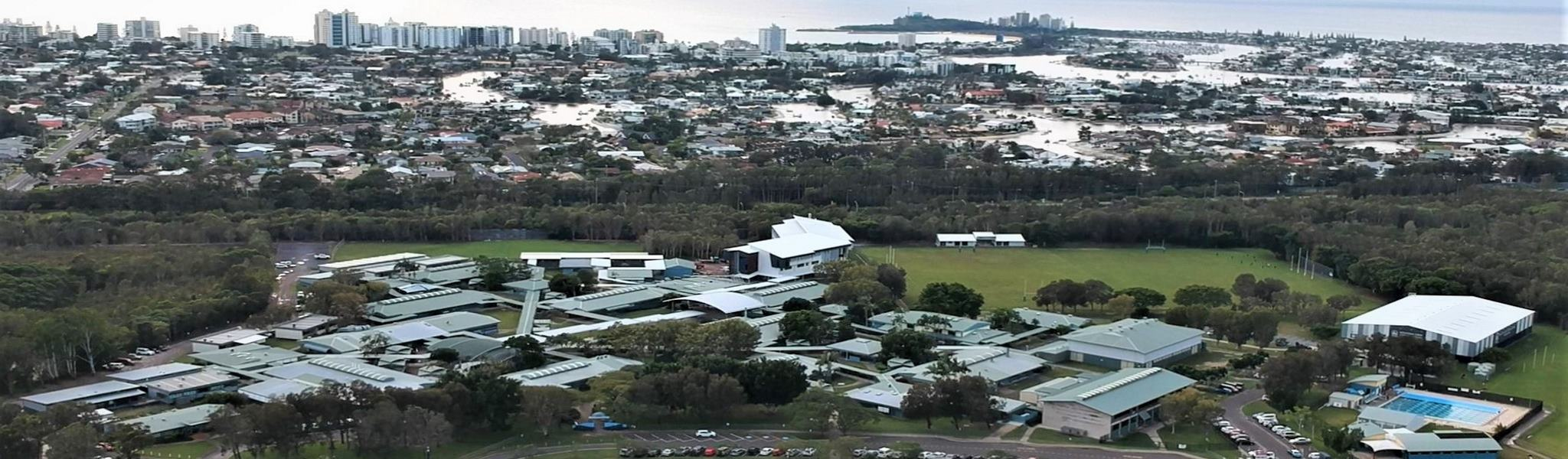
- Mountain Creek State High School (foreground) looking over Mooloolaba to the Coral Sea, 2019

- Interactive map of Mountain Creek
- Coordinates: 26.6986°S 153.1011°E
- Country: Australia
- State: Queensland
- City: Buderim
- LGA: Sunshine Coast Region
- Location: 8.6 km (5.3 mi) S of Maroochydore; 16.5 km (10.3 mi) N of Caloundra; 95.1 km (59.1 mi) NNE of Brisbane
- Established: 1986

Government
  - State electorate: Buderim
  - Federal division: Fairfax

Area
  - Total: 7.3 km^{2} (2.8 sq mi)

Population
  - Total: 11,950 (2021 census)
  - Density: 1,637/km^{2} (4,240/sq mi)
- Time zone: UTC+10:00 (AEST)
- Postcode: 4557
- County: Canning
- Parish: Mooloolah
Suburbs around Mountain Creek
Buderim	Mooloolaba	Mooloolaba
Buderim	Mountain Creek	Minyama
Sippy Downs	Sippy Downs	Parrearra

Mountain Creek is a suburb in the Sunshine Coast Region, Queensland, Australia. In the 2021 census, Mountain Creek had a population of 11,950 people.

== Geography ==
Mountain Creek was named after the creek of the same name that drains the southern slopes of Buderim. It is tidal for a short distance and flows into the Mooloolah River above the Cod Hole and the Traffic Bridge on the Nicklin Way.

== History ==
The suburb was named and bounded on 25 October 1986.

Mountain Creek State School opened on 1 January 1994.

Mountain Creek State High School on 27 January 1995.

Brightwater State School opened on 1 January 2012.

== Demographics ==
In the 2016 census, Mountain Creek had a population of 11,254 people.

In the 2021 census, Mountain Creek had a population of 11,950 people.

== Education ==
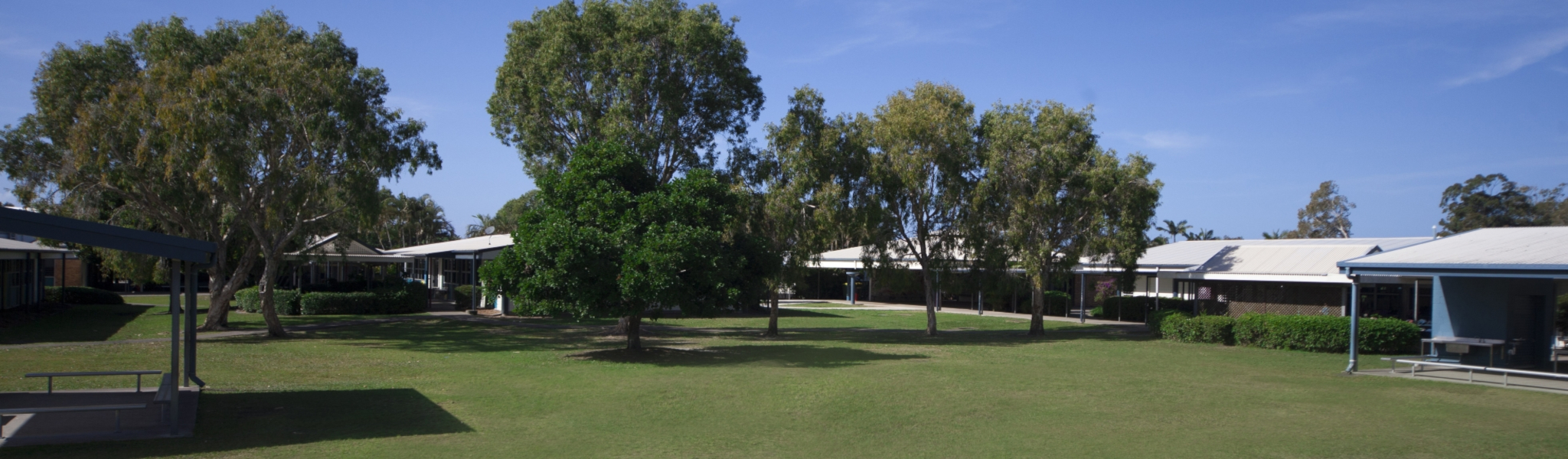
Mountain Creek State School, 2018

Mountain Creek State School is a government primary (Prep–6) school for boys and girls at Lady Musgrave Drive (26.6909°S 153.1033°E). It includes a special education program. In 2018, the school had an enrolment of 984 students with 68 teachers (59 full-time equivalent) and 48 non-teaching staff (31 full-time equivalent). In 2022, the school had an enrolment of 800 students with 63 teachers (52 full-time equivalent) and 40 non-teaching staff (26 full-time equivalent).

Brightwater State School is a government primary (Prep–6) school for boys and girls at 20 Dianella Drive (26.7091°S 153.1115°E). It includes a special education program. In 2018, the school had an enrolment of 1,055 students with 70 teachers (62 full-time equivalent) and 30 non-teaching staff (22 full-time equivalent). In 2022, the school had an enrolment of 909 students with 68 teachers (59 full-time equivalent) and 27 non-teaching staff (21 full-time equivalent).

Mountain Creek State High School is a government secondary (7–12) school for boys and girls at Lady Musgrave Drive (26.6881°S 153.1029°E). It includes a special education program. In 2018, the school had an enrolment of 2,111 students with 168 teachers (151 full-time equivalent) and 57 non-teaching staff (43 full-time equivalent). In 2022, the school had an enrolment of 2,179 students with 171 teachers (157 full-time equivalent) and 54 non-teaching staff (42 full-time equivalent).

Despite the name, the Mooloolaba campus of TAFE Queensland is at 34 Lady Musgrave Drive in Mountain Creek (26.6923°S 153.1068°E).

== Amenities ==
The Sunshine Coast Regional Council operates a mobile library service which visits Glenfields Boulevard near the park and Karawatha Drive near the shopping centre.

There are a number of parks in the area:

- Brightwater Community & Lake Park (26.7103°S 153.1075°E)
- Brightwater Park (26.7128°S 153.1090°E)
- Coomoo Crescent Park (26.6976°S 153.0919°E)
- Cootamundra Drive Park (26.7025°S 153.1075°E)
- Corkwood Circuit Park (26.7034°S 153.0990°E)
- Dardgee Park (26.7131°S 153.1021°E)
- Elsa Wilson Drive Walkway (26.6856°S 153.0990°E)
- Frogmouth Circuit Park (26.7118°S 153.0970°E)
- Glenfields Neighbourhood Park (26.7038°S 153.0963°E)
- Holbrook Park (26.6949°S 153.0899°E)
- Kawana Island Riparian Reserve (26.7065°S 153.1166°E)
- Lady Musgrave Drive Walkway (26.6855°S 153.1029°E)
- Loang Court Park (26.6972°S 153.0907°E)
- Lurnea Crescent Park (26.6957°S 153.0962°E)
- Mountain Ash Fire Break, Sauger Court (26.7054°S 153.0905°E)
- Mountain Creek Lake 1 Park (26.6932°S 153.0987°E)
- Mountain Creek Lake 2 Park (26.6979°S 153.0929°E)
- Mountain Creek Rodd Corner Park (26.6930°S 153.0937°E)
- Mountain Creek Riparian Reserve (26.6984°S 153.0937°E)
- Mountain Creek Road Natural Amenity Reserve (26.6935°S 153.0936°E)
- Parklea Esplanade Park (26.6973°S 153.0989°E)
- Parragundi Park (26.6906°S 153.1002°E)
- Philosophers Walk Reserve (26.6971°S 153.1008°E)
- Photinia Crescent Park (26.7138°S 153.1056°E)
- Pipi Place Park (26.6938°S 153.1023°E)
- Prelude Drive Park (26.6974°S 153.1031°E)
- Quota Hideaway Park (26.7014°S 153.1068°E)
- Redbud Bushland Park (26.6969°S 153.0969°E)
- Sailfish Drive Park (26.7044°S 153.0924°E)
- Saratoga Drive Park (26.6956°S 153.0999°E)
- Skua Place Park (26.7122°S 153.0979°E)
