= Kawana Shoppingworld =

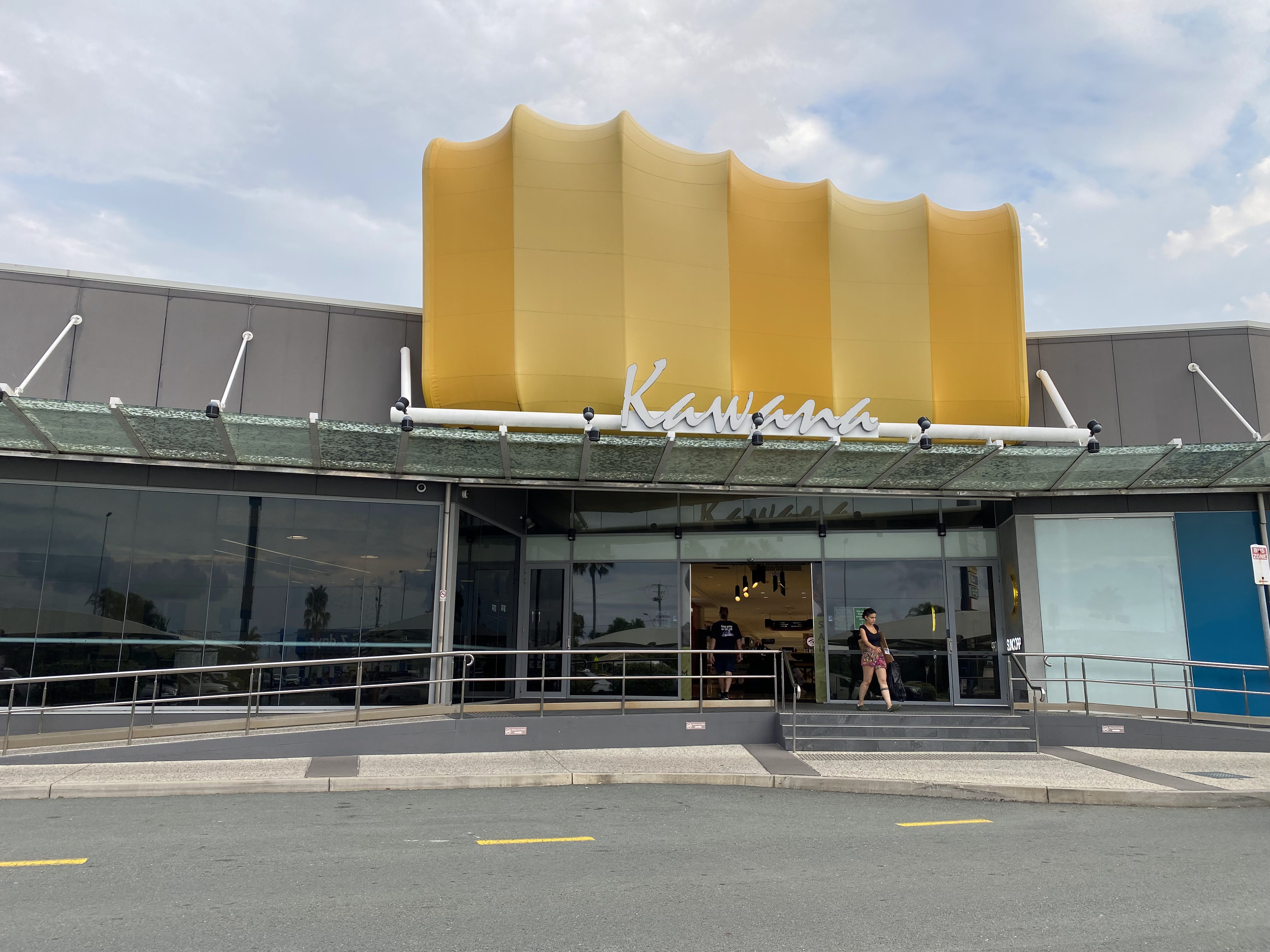
- Location: Buddina, Queensland, Australia
- Coordinates: 26°42′11″S 153°07′50.6″E
- Address: 119 Point Cartwright Drive
- Management: Mirvac
- Owner: Mirvac
- Stores: 157
- Anchor tenants: 4
- Floor area: 38,403 square metres (413,370 sq ft)
- Floors: 1
- Parking: 1828
- Website: kawanashoppingworld.com.au

Kawana Shoppingworld is a regional shopping centre located in Buddina, Queensland, Australia, that is operated by Mirvac. Anchor tenants include Coles Supermarkets, Aldi, Woolworths, Big W, and JB Hi-Fi.

== History ==
The centre opened in 1979 and was the first shopping centre to open on the Sunshine Coast. The centre has since undergone refurbishments. In 2002 a new food court was developed along with the addition of Bi-Lo (now Coles Supermarkets). Another extension began in January 2013 and included an Aldi supermarket and over 70 specialty stores which opened in mid-2014. In 2017 work began to add a 10-screen cinema and to expand the dining district and associated car park by 750 places.

== Public transport ==
Kawana Shoppingworld is serviced by multiple Kinetic Sunshine Coast bus routes from Maroochydore, University of the Sunshine Coast, Sippy Downs and Caloundra. A new station was built in 2014.
