= Sippy Downs, Queensland =

Sippy Downs
- Suburb
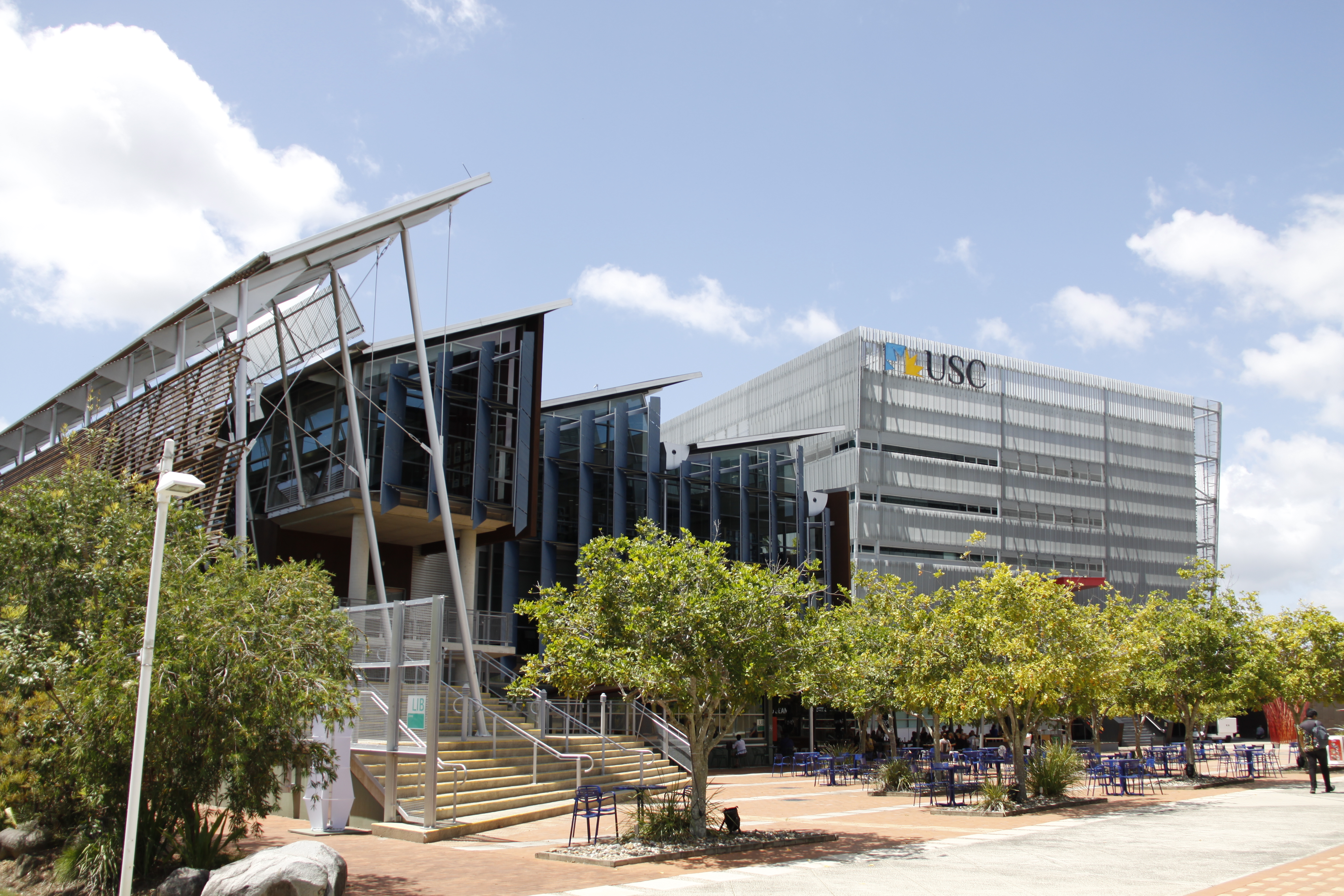
- University of the Sunshine Coast, 2019

- Interactive map of Sippy Downs
- Coordinates: 26.7233°S 153.0844°E
- Country: Australia
- State: Queensland
- City: Sunshine Coast
- LGA: Sunshine Coast Region
- Location: 5.4 km (3.4 mi) S of Buderim CBD; 18.0 km (11.2 mi) NW of Caloundra CBD; 93.6 km (58.2 mi) N of Brisbane CBD

Government
  - State electorate: Buderim
  - Federal division: Fisher

Area
  - Total: 14.5 km^{2} (5.6 sq mi)

Population
  - Total: 11,544 (2021 census)
  - Density: 796.1/km^{2} (2,062/sq mi)
- Time zone: UTC+10:00 (AEST)
- Postcode: 4556
- County: Canning
- Parish: Mooloolah
Suburbs around Sippy Downs
Buderim	Mountain Creek	Parrearra
Tanawha	Sippy Downs	Parrearra
Palmview	Palmview	Warana; Meridan Plains

Sippy Downs is a suburb of Buderim in the Sunshine Coast Region, Queensland, Australia. In the 2021 census, Sippy Downs had a population of 11,544 people.

== Geography ==
Sippy Downs is part of the Buderim urban centre. It contains the housing estate locality of Chancellor Park, and Australia's newest university, the University of the Sunshine Coast. Prior to development the area featured coastal forests and plains.

== History ==
The name 'Sippy' is derived from the Aboriginal word Dhippi or Jippi, a generic name for winged creatures and believed to mean a place of birds.

Sippy Downs was a part of the Moolooloo Plains pastoral run leased by John Westaway & Sons in the 1860s. In 1870 all runs ceased, and the land became available for lease. It was not occupied until 1938, when it was occupied as a perpetual lease selection until 1957. Sippy Downs was then purchased by Alfred Grant. A portion was then sold onto Frank Cunning who raised cattle there until it was sold to the INVESTA property group in 2002. Brahman cattle were still on the property as it was being surveyed for the housing development.

Sippy Downs was established as a suburb in 1993 following the decision by the Shire of Maroochy to rezone the area. Sugar cane farms continued to operate in Sippy Downs until the last, owned by Bundaberg Sugar, closed in 2003.

Harmony Montessori School opened in Sippy Downs in 1995 with 13 children and one teacher. In 2005 it was renamed Alcheringa Montessori College. In 2007, the land being leased for the school was scheduled for development and the school had to relocate. In 2015, the school purchased on 22 hectares (54 acres) in Forest Glen and re-opened the school as Montessori International College.

Siena Catholic College opened in 1997 with 98 Year 8 students. It is named after St Catherine of Siena.

Chancellor State School opened on 28 January 1997 as a primary (P-7) school. In 2004, secondary education was added and it was renamed Chancellor State College.

Siena Catholic Primary School opened on 26 September 2001 on a site immediately adjacent to Siena Catholic College.

The University of the Sunshine Coast opened on 26 February 1996 with 542 students; planning began in 1994.

== Demographics ==
In the 2016 census, Sippy Downs had a population of 10,298 people.

In the 2021 census, Sippy Downs had a population of 11,544 people.

== Economy ==
Sippy Downs has been designated as a 'Knowledge Hub' in the Queensland Government's South East Queensland Infrastructure Plan and Program and is master planned as Australia's first university town with the potential for over 6,000 workers in knowledge based businesses.

== Education ==
Siena Catholic Primary School is a Catholic primary (Prep–6) school for boys and girls at 58 Sippy Downs Drive (26.7158°S 153.0573°E). In 2018, the school had an enrolment of 624 students with 40 teachers (34 full-time equivalent) and 27 non-teaching staff (16 full-time equivalent).

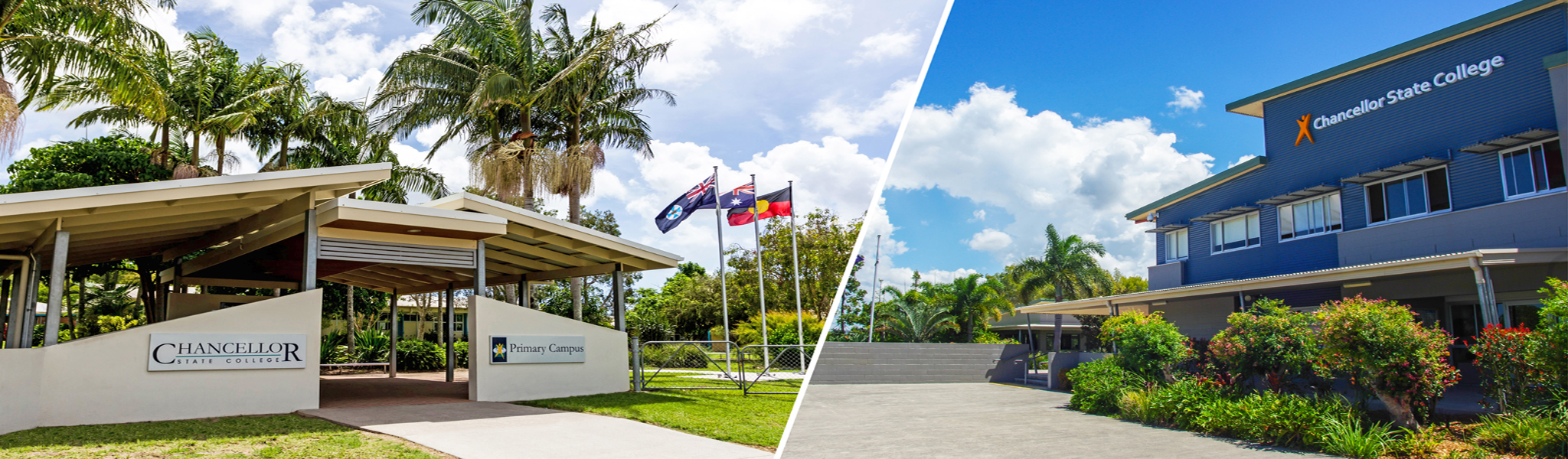
Chancellor State College (primary campus on left, secondary campus on right), 2019

Chancellor State College is a government primary and secondary (Prep–12) school for boys and girls. The school has two campuses: the primary school campus at Scholars Drive (26.7213°S 153.0594°E) and the secondary school campus at Sippy Downs Drive (26.7146°S 153.0683°E). In 2018, the school had an enrolment of 2,975 students with 227 teachers (209 full-time equivalent) and 99 non-teaching staff (69 full-time equivalent). It includes a special education program.

Siena Catholic College is a Catholic secondary (7–12) school for boys and girls at 60 Sippy Downs Drive (26.7160°S 153.0568°E). In 2018, the school had an enrolment of 908 students with 71 teachers (66 full-time equivalent) and 37 non-teaching staff (27 full-time equivalent).

The University of the Sunshine Coast is at 90 Sippy Downs Drive (26.7177°S 153.0625°E).

== Amenities ==
The Sunshine Coast Council operates a mobile library service which visits the Chancellor Park Marketplace on University Way.
