= Mooloolah River =

River in Queensland, Australia

Mooloolah
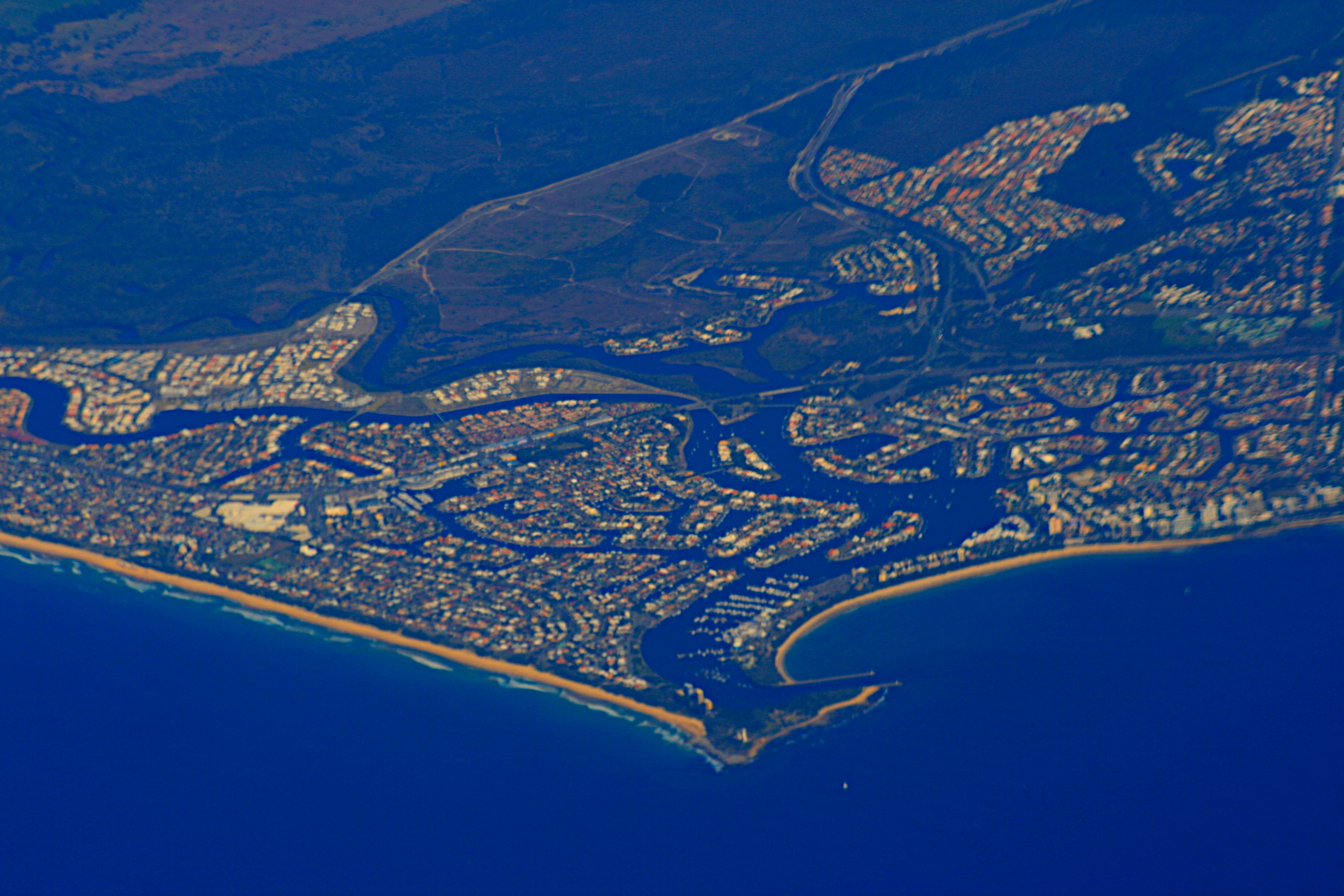
- Aerial photo of Mooloolaba showing river mouth and canals, 2007

Location
- Country: Australia
- State: Queensland
- Region: South East Queensland

Physical characteristics
- Source: Blackall Range
- Mouth: Pacific Ocean
  - location: Mooloolaba, Queensland
  - coordinates: 26°40′52″S 153°08′04″E
- Length: 69.8 km (43.4 mi)
- Basin size: 221 km^{2} (85 sq mi)

The Mooloolah River is a river in South East Queensland, Australia. The river rises from the eastern slopes of the Blackall Range and flows east-northeast, similar to the Maroochy River to the north. The mouth of the river is at southern Mooloolaba. The catchment area covers 221 km2.

Addlington Creek, a tributary of the Mooloolah River was dammed by the Ewen Maddock Dam in 1973. Mountain Creek is another tributary that rises on the Buderim mountain that divides the Mooloolah and Maroochy watersheds.

The gastric-brooding frog is a recently extinct frog that was discovered in only three catchments, the Mary River, Mooloolah River and Stanley Rivers.

Although the Mooloolah River doesn't experience major flooding often, a flood warning system was established in 2004 to inform the Sunshine Coast Regional Council with river height predictions from network of rainfall and river height field stations.

== See also ==
- List of rivers of Australia
- Mooloolah River National Park
