= Bokarina, Queensland =

Bokarina
- Suburb
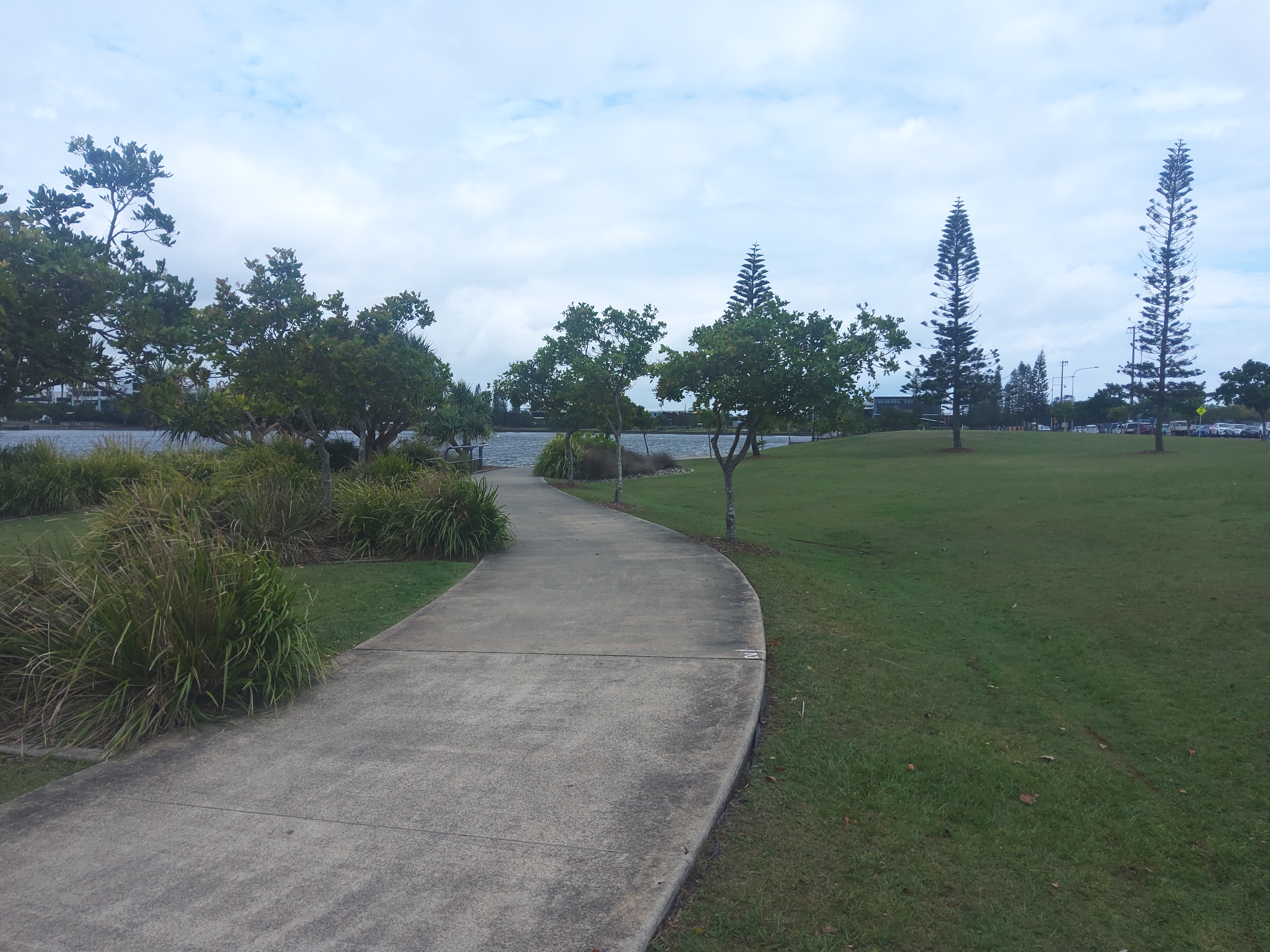
- Pathway along Lake Kawana, 2021

- Interactive map of Bokarina
- Coordinates: 26.7388°S 153.1294°E
- Country: Australia
- State: Queensland
- LGA: Sunshine Coast Region
- Location: 9.1 km (5.7 mi) N of Caloundra; 11.9 km (7.4 mi) SSE of Maroochydore; 26.2 km (16.3 mi) SE of Nambour; 104 km (65 mi) N of Brisbane

Government
  - State electorate: Kawana
  - Federal division: Fisher

Area
  - Total: 1.7 km^{2} (0.66 sq mi)

Population
  - Total: 1,935 (2021 census)
  - Density: 1,140/km^{2} (2,950/sq mi)
- Time zone: UTC+10:00 (AEST)
- Postcode: 4575
- County: Canning
- Parish: Bribie
Suburbs around Bokarina
Warana	Warana	Coral Sea
Birtinya	Bokarina	Coral Sea
Birtinya	Wurtulla	Coral Sea

Bokarina is a coastal suburb in the Sunshine Coast Region, Queensland, Australia, located within the Kawana Waters urban centre. In the 2021 census, Bokarina had a population of 1,935 people.

== Georgraphy ==
The suburb is bounded to the east by Bokarina Beach and the Coral Sea and to the west by the man-made Lake Kawana.

The road route Nicklin Way enters the suburb from the north (Warana) and exits to the south (Wurtulla).

The land use between the Nicklin Way and the beach is suburban housing. The land to the west of Nicklin Way is mostly used for community facilities such as the stadium, the school, and churches.

== History ==
Lake Kawana, 2021

The name Bokarina was bestowed at the request of the land developer, Alfred Grant Pty Ltd, in the belief that the name was an Aboriginal expression indicating middle i.e. half-way along the Kawana Waters land-development scheme in 1969.

In the early 1980s, Bokarina emerged as Bokarina Beach, with an initial subdivision between the foreshore reserve and the sports complex on Nicklin Way.

Holy Trinity Kawana Anglican Church opened in 1982.

Kawana Waters State High School opened 28 January 1986. Bokarina State School opened on 27 January 1987. On 1 January 2006 the two schools was amalgamated to form Kawana – Bokarina State College, which was renamed on 3 March 2006 to become Kawana Waters State College.

Kawana Waters Uniting Church was dedicated by Reverend Raymond F. Hunt (Moderator of the Uniting Church in Australia, Queensland Synod) on 20 July 1986.

The hm.church opened in 2025.

== Demographics ==
In the 2011 census, Bokarina had a population of 1,235 people, 50.9% female and 49.1% male. The median age of the Bokarina population was 38 years, 1 year above the national median of 37. 81.8% of people living in Bokarina were born in Australia. The other top responses for country of birth were England 5.1%, New Zealand 4.7%, Philippines 0.6%, Scotland 0.5%, Germany 0.5%. 93.9% of people spoke only English at home; the next most common languages were 0.6% German, 0.6% Mandarin, 0.4% Tagalog, 0.4% Cantonese, 0.3% Punjabi.

In the 2016 census, Bokarina had a population of 1,351 people.

In the 2021 census, Bokarina had a population of 1,935 people.

== Education ==
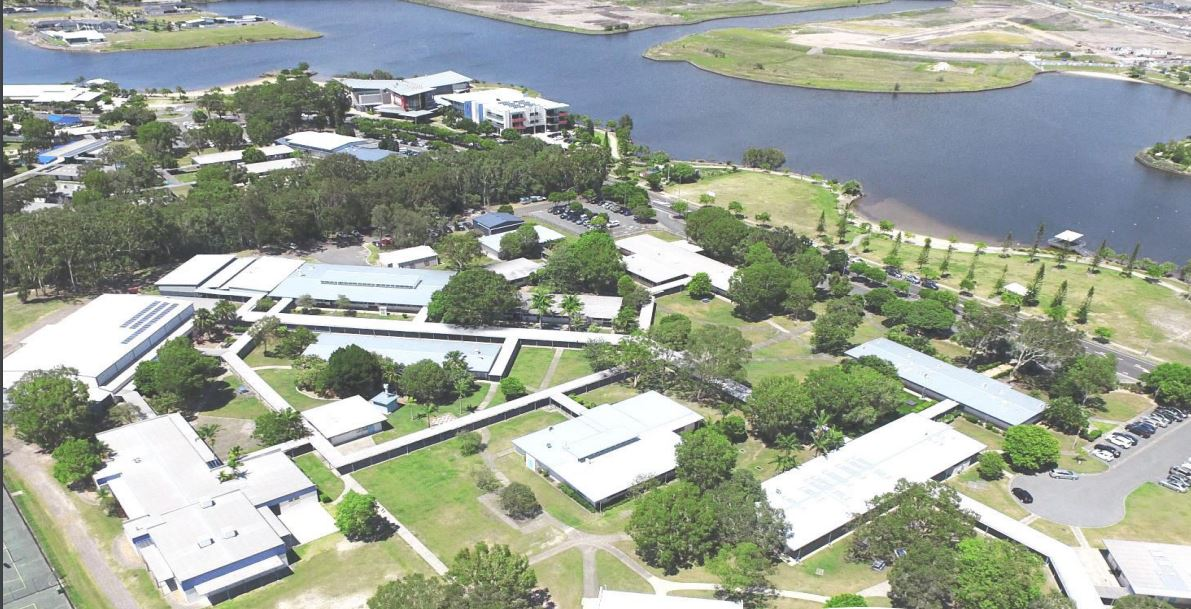
Kawana Waters State College, 2024

Kawana Waters State College is a government primary and secondary (Prep-12) school for boys and girls at 119 Sportsmans Parade (26.7409°S 153.1264°E). In 2018, the school had an enrolment of 1,614 students with 130 teachers (118 full-time equivalent) and 64 non-teaching staff (45 full-time equivalent). It includes a special education program.

== Amenities ==
The Sunshine Coast Stadium is at 31 Sportsmans Parade (26.7337°S 153.1261°E). It hosts sporting competitions, concerts, and other community events.

Kawana Aquatic Centre is at 45 Sportsman Parade (26.7353°S 153.1259°E) It has 5 heated pools available for leisure, lessons, and training for swimming, diving and water polo.

Kawana Waters Uniting Church is at 3 Honeysuckle Drive (26.7364°S 153.1317°E).

Holy Trinity Kawana Anglican Church is at 11 Meridan Street (26.7421°S 153.1279°E).

The hm.church is at 88 Sportsmans Parade (26.7385°S 153.1246°E).
