= Banya, Queensland =

Banya
- Suburb
- Interactive map of Banya
- Coordinates: 26.8302°S 153.0413°E
- Country: Australia
- State: Queensland
- LGA: Sunshine Coast Region
- Location: 5.4 km (3.4 mi) SW of Baringa; 11.3 km (7.0 mi) SW of Caloundra; 31.2 km (19.4 mi) S of Nambour; 91.9 km (57.1 mi) N of Brisbane
- Established: 2019

Government
  - State electorate: Caloundra
  - Federal division: Fisher

Area
  - Total: 3.4 km^{2} (1.3 sq mi)
- Time zone: UTC+10:00 (AEST)
- Postcode: 4551
Suburbs around Banya
Landsborough	Nirimba	Nirimba
Landsborough	Banya	Bells Creek
Landsborough	Coochin Creek	Gagalba

Banya is a locality in the Sunshine Coast Region, Queensland, Australia. It forms part of the Caloundra South Priority Development Area, a large-scale masterplanned community being developed by Stockland under the name Aura.

== Geography ==
Banya is bounded by Nirimba to the north, Bells Creek to the east, Gagalba to the south-east, and Landsborough to the west. The suburb lies within the Pumicestone Passage catchment, which drains into the Ramsar-listed Moreton Bay Marine Park.

The Aura Brook, a landscaped waterway and linear parkland, runs along the boundary between Banya and Nirimba. Modelled on Kedron Brook in Brisbane, this parkland incorporates water management systems including raingardens and bioretention basins, and connects several parks across a planned five-kilometre walking trail network. Features include the Enchanted Garden Park, which has glow-in-the-dark pathways, a dog park, pedestrian bridges, and a boardwalk crossing linking Banya to Nirimba State Primary School. Green links connect residents to the Bells Creek Conservation Area to the east.

== History ==
Banya is situated in the traditional country of the Gubbi Gubbi (Kabi Kabi) Aboriginal people. The name Banya is derived from the Gubbi Gubbi and Butchulla (Badtjala) languages, meaning bunya nut.

The area was cleared more than 50 years ago for pine plantation forestry, and was subsequently used for low-intensity cattle grazing. On 22 October 2010, the Queensland Government declared the Caloundra South area an urban development area under the Urban Land Development Authority Act 2007 to accelerate development. Following the transition of the Urban Land Development Authority to Economic Development Queensland on 1 February 2013, the area became a declared priority development area (PDA) under the Economic Development Act 2012.

On 14 June 2019, parts of the localities of Bells Creek and Meridan Plains were excised to create the new localities of Banya, Corbould Park, Gagalba and Nirimba.

The first residents moved into Banya in August 2022, following land releases that began in July of that year, making it the third suburb established within the Aura development after Baringa and Nirimba.

== Development ==
Banya forms part of the Aura masterplanned community, a $5 billion development by Stockland that spans 2,310 hectares across the Caloundra South Priority Development Area. When fully developed, the broader Aura area is planned to accommodate approximately 50,000 residents in 20,000 homes, along with 700 hectares of conservation land and parkland. Aura is marketed as the "City of Colour" due to its vibrant public art and design elements.

Development applications within the Caloundra South PDA are assessed by Economic Development Queensland rather than by Sunshine Coast Council. On 2 November 2015, a tripartite infrastructure agreement between Stockland, the council and the Minister for Economic Development Queensland was signed to coordinate the delivery of local government infrastructure.

Banya includes several residential precincts including Acacia and Rivus. Plans for the suburb include a proposed state primary school, a private P-12 school, two neighbourhood village centres, and up to three childcare centres. A 500-unit retirement resort on Western Drive, designed by Archipelago and Stockland Halcyon, was proposed in May 2023.

== Transport ==
Bells Creek Arterial Road provides access to the Bruce Highway and connections to Caloundra Road. Within the suburb, Nirimba Drive was extended across the Aura Brook in late 2025 to provide a direct connection between Banya Avenue and Nirimba.

A proposed railway station at Bells Creek (Aura), located adjacent to the planned Aura town centre, would serve the suburb as part of The Wave, a heavy rail project linking Beerwah to Birtinya via Caloundra. The project, announced by the Queensland Government in March 2025 as part of its 2032 Olympic and Paralympic Games delivery plan, will include approximately 19 kilometres of new dual-track rail line in Stage 1, with stations at Bells Creek (Aura) and Caloundra, and an upgrade to Beerwah station. The Australian and Queensland governments have each committed $2.75 billion to deliver Stage 1.

== Environment ==
The Caloundra South development area lies within the catchment of Pumicestone Passage, an internationally significant Ramsar wetland that forms part of the Moreton Bay Marine Park. The passage supports seagrass meadows, mangroves, and intertidal flats that provide habitat for threatened species including dugong, loggerhead and green turtles, and the water mouse.

Environmental conditions attached to the development's approval under the Environment Protection and Biodiversity Conservation Act 1999 require Stockland to manage stormwater quality and protect habitats for the vulnerable wallum sedge frog (Litoria olongburensis). Since 2012, habitat restoration work led by frog expert Dr Mark Bayley has resulted in the construction of 155 artificial wetlands across more than 200 hectares of conservation land within the Aura site, representing an Australian first in large-scale habitat creation for the species. Monitoring has confirmed successful breeding of the frogs in the created habitats.

== Demographics ==
The population of Banya was not separately reported in the 2021 Australian census. It was included in the 2021 census data for its neighbouring locality Bells Creek.

== Education ==
There are no schools in Banya. The nearest government primary school is Nirimba State Primary School in neighbouring Nirimba to the north. The nearest government secondary school is Baringa State Secondary College in Baringa to the north-east.

== See also ==
- Maroochydore railway line
- Pumicestone Passage
- Wallum sedge frog
