= Coochin Creek =

- Suburb
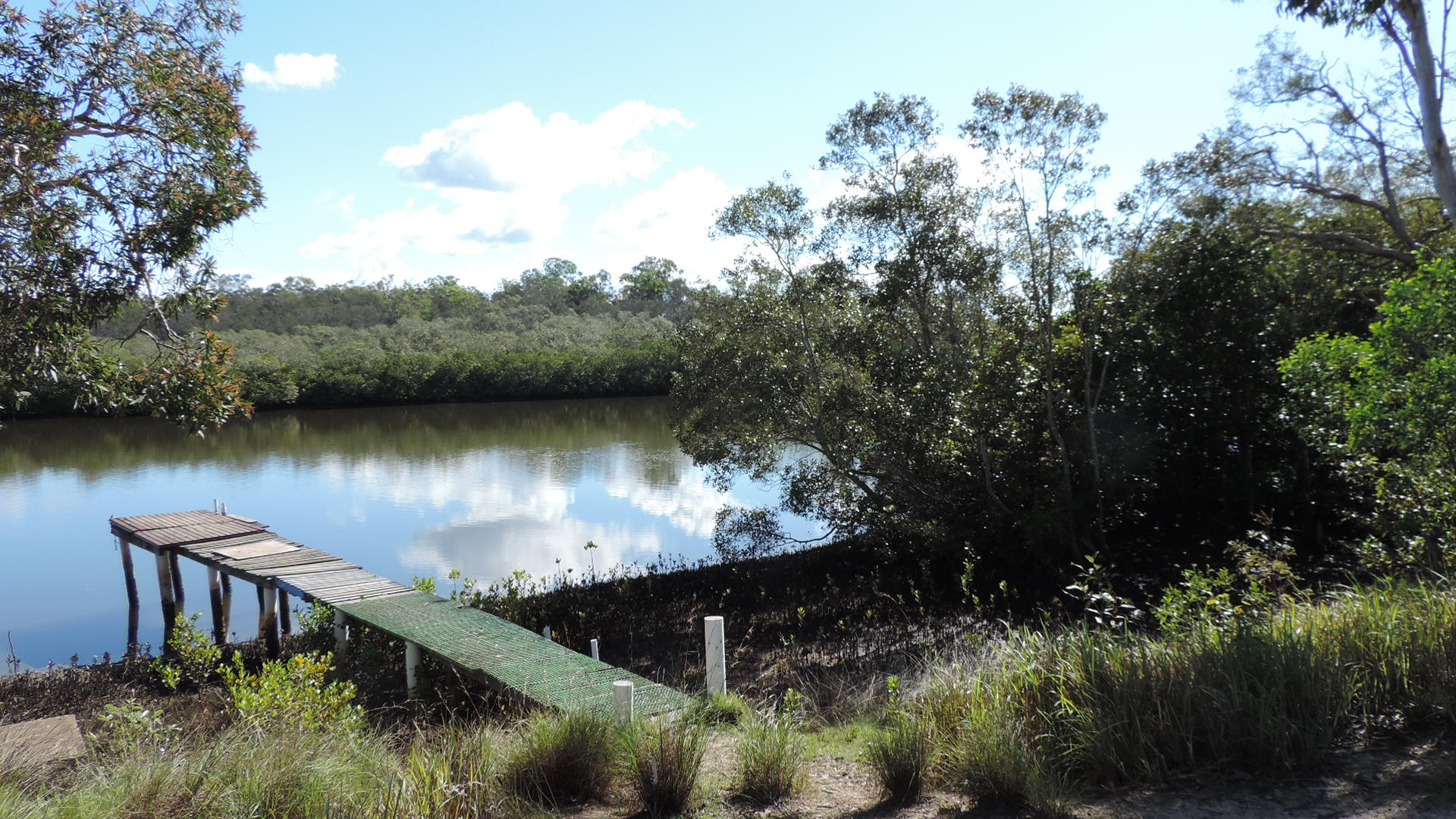
- Coochin Creek as seen from The Esplanade, 2019

- Interactive map of Coochin Creek
- Coordinates: 26.8894°S 153.0555°E
- Country: Australia
- State: Queensland
- City: Sunshine Coast
- LGA: Sunshine Coast Region
- Location: 19.6 km (12.2 mi) SE of Beerwah; 29.1 km (18.1 mi) SW of Caloundra; 40.4 km (25.1 mi) SSE of Nambour; 84.0 km (52.2 mi) N of Brisbane

Government
  - State electorates: Caloundra; Glass House
  - Federal division: Fisher

Area
  - Total: 82.3 km^{2} (31.8 sq mi)

Population
  - Total: 76 (2021 census)
  - Density: 0.923/km^{2} (2.392/sq mi)
- Time zone: UTC+10:00 (AEST)
- Postcode: 4519
- County: Canning
- Parish: Beerwah
Suburbs around Coochin Creek
Landsborough; Banya	Gagalba; Bells Creek	Pelican Waters; Golden Beach
Beerwah; Glass House Mountains	Coochin Creek	Bribie Island North
Beerburrum	Beerburrum	Bribie Island North

Coochin Creek is a coastal locality in the south of the Sunshine Coast Region, Queensland, Australia. The locality is named after the creek which flows through it. In the 2021 census, Coochin Creek had a population of 76 people.

== Geography ==
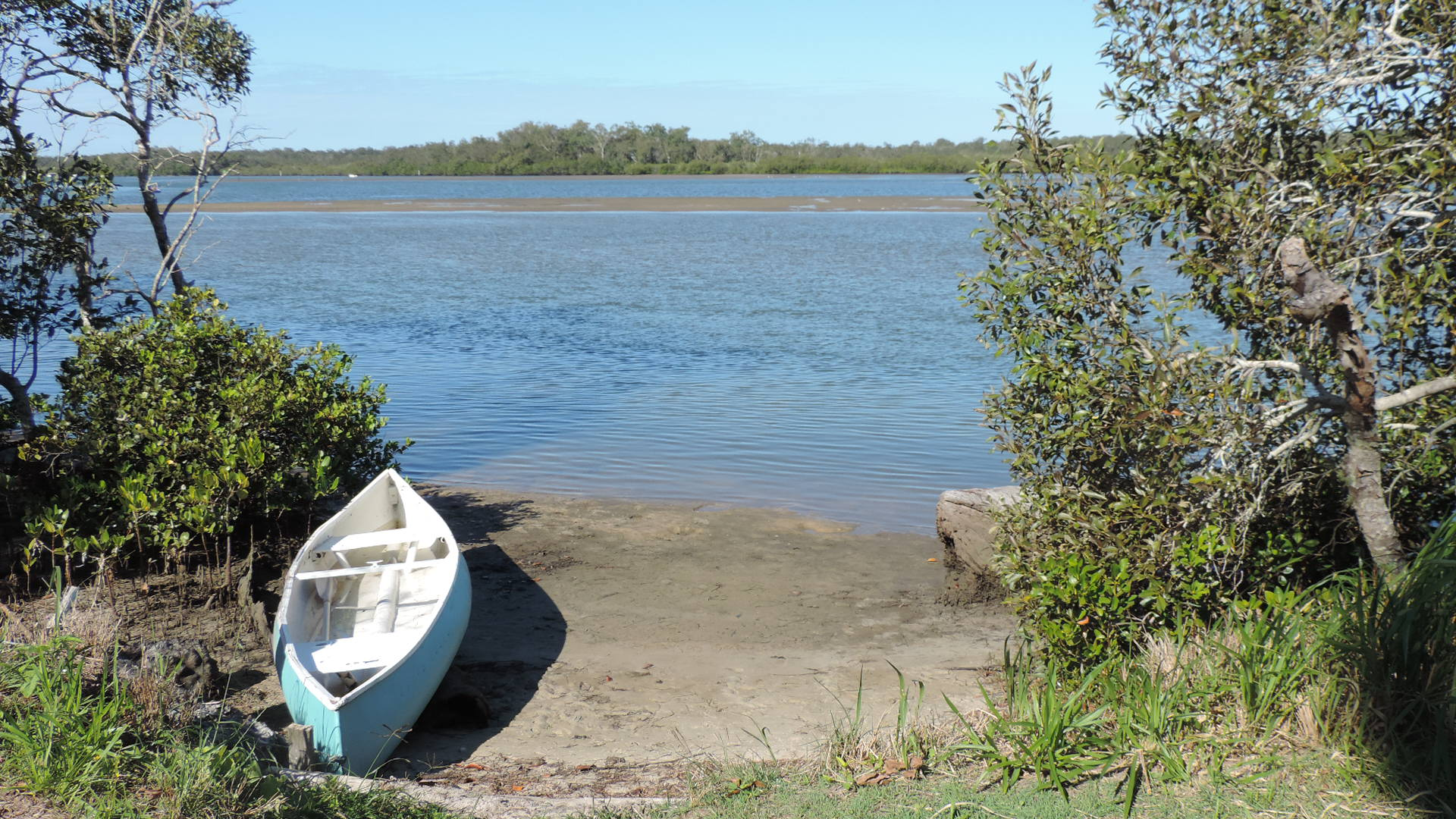
Looking from Coochin Creek across the Pumicestone Channel to Bribie Island North, 2019

Although bounded to the east by the Australian mainland coast, Coochin does not face towards the Coral Sea but rather it faces the Pumicestone Passage (26.9463°S 153.0751°E), which separates the mainland from Bribie Island. Pumicestone Passage is very narrow at that point and congested with low unnamed mangrove islands.

The creek Coochin Creek rises in Beerwah and enters the locality from the west of the locality and then flows towards the south-west of the locality where it enters the Pumicestone Passage at 26.9086°S 153.0683°E. The name Coochin is derived from the Kabi word kut'dhin referring to the red clay or pigment used for body painting.

Wild Horse Mountain is in the south-west of the locality (26.9303°S 152.9982°E) and rises to 123 metres (404 ft) above sea level.

The abandoned township of Campbellville is within the locality of Coochin Creek near the confluence of the creek Coochin Creek and Mellum Creek (26.8747°S 153.0380°E).

Much of the locality is within protected areas including Beerburrum State Forest in the north-west of the locality, Beerburrum East State Forest in the west and south-west of the locality. In the centre and east of the locality are seven sections of the Pumicestone National Park. The small area of developed land within the locality is on the northern bank of the creek Coochin Creek and the coast north of the confluence, consisting of farmland mostly used for horticulture and some residences. There are numerous areas of marshland along the creek and coast.

== History ==
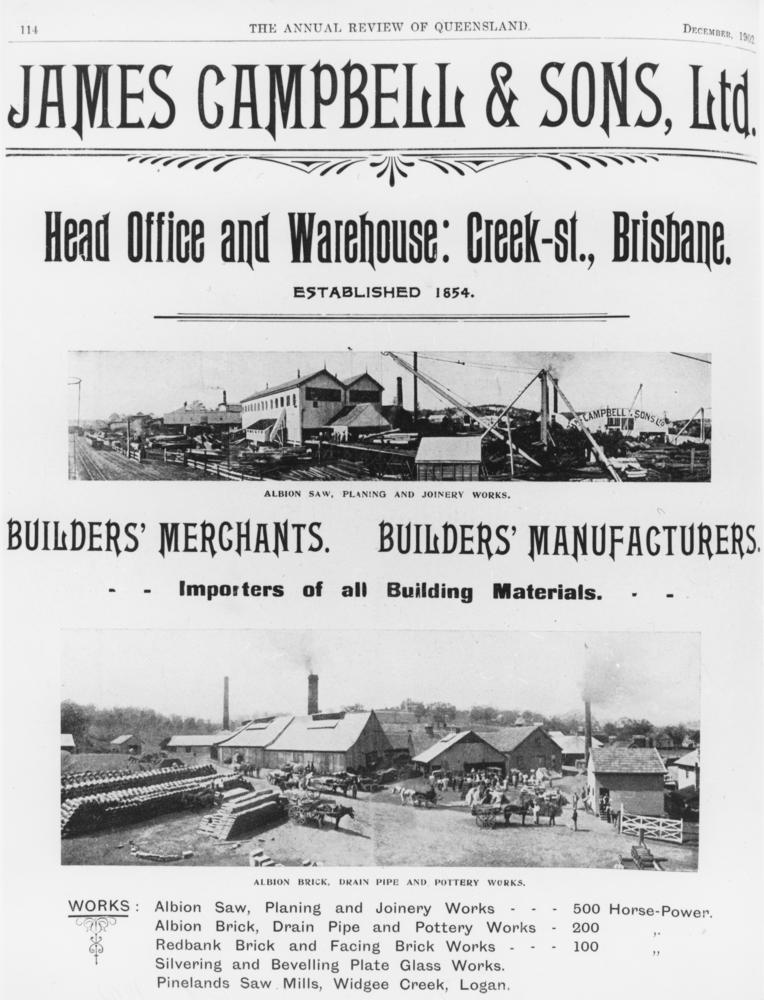
Advertisement for James Campbell and Sons Ltd, Creek Street, Brisbane, 1902

James Campbell had a sawmill in Creek Street, Brisbane. Logs were cut in the Blackall Range and upper Caboolture River and hauled to Mellum Creek from where they were rafted down the Pumicestone Passage to the Creek Street sawmill. In 1881, James Campbell decided to establish a sawmill on the Coochin Creek near the confluence with Mellum Creek, from where the sawn timber was transported to Brisbane, initially via sailing cutter and from 1883 by paddlesteamer.

The township of Campbellville of around 100 people developed around the sawmill. A mail service was established to Mellum Creek and Coochin saw-mills in January 1883. In August 1883 a Post Office was established at Campbellville in place of the receiving office at Coochin Saw-mills. The Post Office was closed in January 1891. There was a wharf with cranes and a provisional school and cemetery. Campbellville was a very social town. It is reported that James Campbell was a believer in improving the working conditions of his staff and gave his workers the "Eight-hour day" without delay, giving them 8 hours of rest, 8 hours of play and 8 hours of work. James Campbell was however opposed to unions – he believed that employers should be benevolent and should "do good for others". The town had a cricket team, an athletics club, a football team and the whole populace loved dancing. There were dances at Mellum Creek, Campbellville and Caboolture as well as Mooloolah and Beerwah. The social gatherings were reported in the Brisbane Courier frequently throughout the 1880s. The balls consisted of a grand supper, performances of singers and actors and then the floor was cleared for dancing.

Campbellville lasted until 1890 when the mill closed down. After the opening of the railway, James Campbell and his sons moved the mill to Albion in Brisbane. The North Coast railway line had made it easier to transport logs and timber by rail than by ship. With the work gone, families moved onto other mill or timber getting towns. Some of the buildings were then reportedly moved to Caloundra, and others taken by bushfire in the dry seasons of 1894 and 1902. The most obvious evidence remaining of the township is its cemetery.

James Campbell and Sons still logged softwoods and pine in the area up until the 1930s but the timber was railed to Brisbane for milling. The Campbell family kept a holiday house at the mouth of Coochin Creek, called "The Bar House". The Bar House was later leased for holiday accommodation.

During the 1930s depression, the land east of Beerwah was planted with exotic pine species by unemployed relief workers, using stock from a state plant nursery at Beerwah. The Pine forests gradually took over the land in the area previously known as Campbellville.

The Coochin Creek Provisional School opened in November 1888, becoming Coochin Creek State School on 1 January 1909. In about November 1928, it was renamed Beerwah State School. On 10 July 1952, another Coochin Creek State School opened, but it closed on 11 March 1962.

== Demographics ==
In the 2016 census, Coochin Creek had a population of 84 people.

In the 2021 census, Coochin Creek had a population of 76 people.

== Heritage listings ==
Coochin Creek has a number of heritage listings, including:

- Roys Road: Campbellville Settlement and Cemetery

== Education ==
There are no schools in Coochin Creek. The nearest government primary schools are Landsborough State School in neighbouring Landsborough to the north-west, Beerwah State School in neighbouring Beerwah to the west, and Beerburrum State School in neighbouring Beerburrum to the south-west. The nearest government secondary schools are Baringa State Secondary College in Baringa to the north and Beerwah State High School in Beerwah.

== Amenities ==
There is a camping area off Roys Rd run by Queensland Government.

== Attractions ==
Wild Horse Mountain Lookout is a tourist attraction (26.9303°S 152.9982°E).
