= Caloundra West, Queensland =

Caloundra West
- Suburb
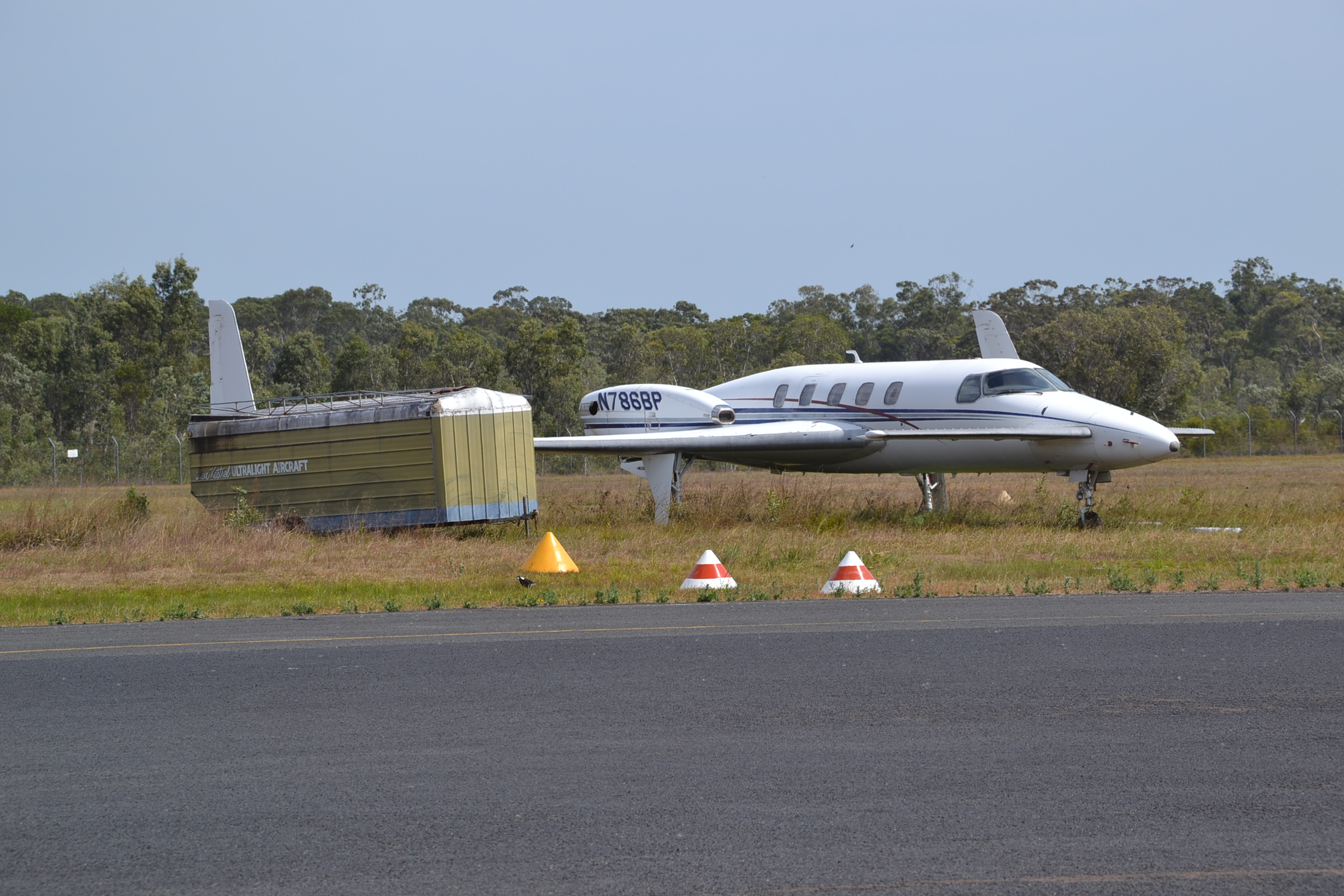
- Beech Starship at Caloundra Airport

- Interactive map of Caloundra West
- Coordinates: 26.8061°S 153.1022°E
- Country: Australia
- State: Queensland
- City: Caloundra
- LGA: Sunshine Coast Region
- Location: 4.5 km (2.8 mi) W of Caloundra; 89.5 km (55.6 mi) N of Brisbane CBD

Government
  - State electorates: Caloundra; Kawana
  - Federal division: Fisher

Area
  - Total: 8.3 km^{2} (3.2 sq mi)

Population
  - Total: 7,270 (2021 census)
  - Density: 876/km^{2} (2,269/sq mi)
- Time zone: UTC+10:00 (AEST)
- Postcode: 4551
- County: Canning
- Parish: Bribie
Suburbs around Caloundra West
| Little Mountain | Aroona | Caloundra |
| Baringa | Caloundra West | Golden Beach |
| Bells Creek | Pelican Waters | Pelican Waters |

Caloundra West is a mixed-use suburb of Caloundra in the Sunshine Coast Region, Queensland, Australia. In the 2021 census, Caloundra West had a population of 7,270 people.

== Geography ==
Caloundra West is within the Caloundra urban centre directly west of the Caloundra central business district.

The north of the suburb has some residential housing, an industrial estate, and undeveloped bushland. Caloundra Airport occupies the centre of the suburb. The west of the suburb is residential housing, while the south of the suburb is undeveloped marshland.

Caloundra Road runs through from west to east.

== History ==
The suburb was named and bounded on 18 June 1988. The name Caloundra is from the Kabi language Cullowundoor with Kal Owen meaning beech tree (Gmelina Leichhardtii) and Dha meaning place.

Unity College opened on 24 January 2006.

== Demographics ==
In the 2016 census Caloundra West had a population of 6,297 people.

In the 2021 census, Caloundra West had a population of 7,270 people.

== Education ==
Unity College is a Catholic primary and secondary (Prep to Year 12) school for boys and girls at 47 Lomond Crescent, Bellvista Estate (26.8029°S 153.0897°E). In 2018, the school had an enrolment of 1,405 students with 111 teachers (100 full-time equivalent) and 62 non-teaching staff (50 full-time equivalent).

There are no government schools in Caloundra West. The nearest government primary schools are Talara Primary College in Currimundi to the north, Meridan State College in Meridan Plains to the north-west, Golden Beach State School in neighbouring Golden Beach to south-east, and Baringa State Primary School in neighbouring Baringa to the west. The nearest government secondary schools are Meridan State College in Meridan Plains to the north-west and Caloundra State High School in Caloundra to the north-east.

== Facilities ==
Caloundra Airport is on Pathfinder Drive (26.8020°S 153.1055°E).

Caloundra Fire Station is at 18 Industrial Avenue (26.7960°S 153.1185°E).

== Amenities ==
The Sunshine Coast Regional Council operates a mobile library service which visits Lomond Crescent in the Bellvista Estate.

There are a number of parks in the suburb, including:

- Beau Vista Park (26.7885°S 153.1098°E)
- Bellvista Neighbourhood Park (26.7999°S 153.0903°E)
- Bellvista Western/East Pathway (26.7975°S 153.0849°E)
- Bimberi Circuit Park (26.7955°S 153.0859°E)
- Cougal Circuit Park (26.7938°S 153.0879°E)
- Dumbarton Drive Park (26.7985°S 153.0951°E)
- Enterprise Road Reserve (26.7964°S 153.1140°E)
- Exeter Way Park (26.7902°S 153.1097°E)
- Glennie Close Park (17.8634°S 102.0597°E)
- Grampion Drive Bushland Park (17.8694°S 102.0602°E)
- Grampion Drive Pump Station (26.8004°S 153.0875°E)
- Heritage Park (17.7154°S 101.9779°E)
- Huntley Place Walkway (26.7949°S 153.0950°E)
- Isabel Jordan Bushland Reserve (26.7968°S 153.1087°E)
- Newing Way Reserve (26.7893°S 153.1117°E)
- Northbrook Street Park (26.7987°S 153.0859°E)
- Queen Street Bushland Park (26.7924°S 153.1249°E)
- Rotary Park (26.8000°S 153.1148°E)
- Shannon Crescent Park (26.7999°S 153.0932°E)
- Springbrook Street Park (26.7951°S 153.0935°E)
- Sydal Street Park (26.7964°S 153.1029°E)
- Toolona Place Walkway (26.7936°S 153.0948°E)
- Tourist Information Park (26.7985°S 153.1142°E)
- Widgee Place Walkway (26.7932°S 153.0914°E)

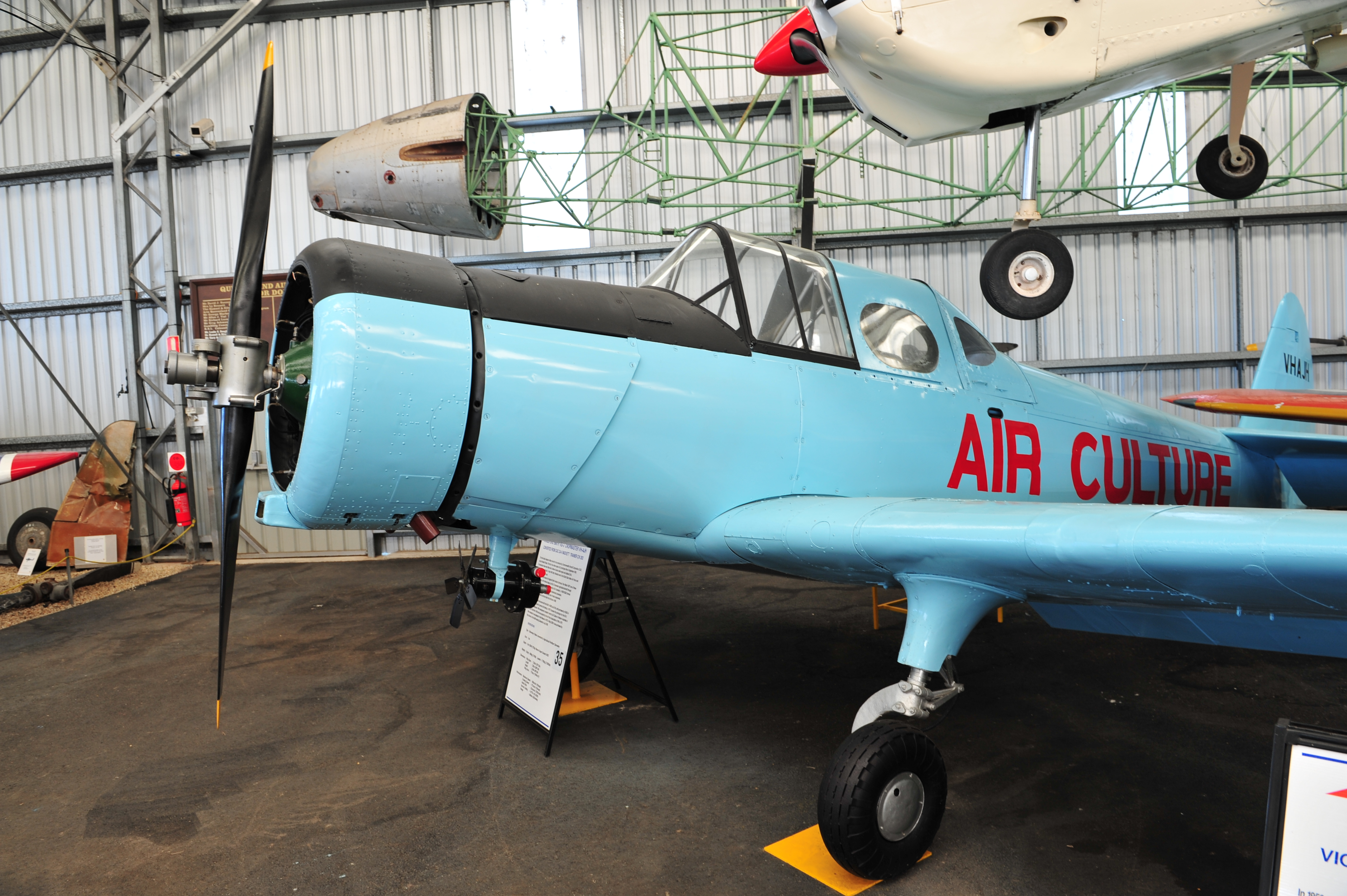
Kingsford Smith Cropmaster at Queensland Air Museum

== Attractions ==
The Queensland Air Museum is at Caloundra Airport on Pathfinder Drive (26.7979°S 153.1093°E).
