= Gagalba, Queensland =

Gagalba
- Suburb
- Interactive map of Gagalba
- Coordinates: 26.8411°S 153.0533°E
- Country: Australia
- State: Queensland
- LGA: Sunshine Coast Region
- Location: 11.7 km (7.3 mi) SW of Baringa; 17.5 km (10.9 mi) SW of Caloundra; 32.4 km (20.1 mi) SSE of Nambour; 84.7 km (52.6 mi) N of Brisbane
- Established: 2019

Government
  - State electorate: Caloundra
  - Federal division: Fisher

Area
  - Total: 5.4 km^{2} (2.1 sq mi)
- Time zone: UTC+10:00 (AEST)
- Postcode: 4551
Suburbs around Gagalba
Banya	Bells Creek	Bells Creek
Banya	Gagalba	Bells Creek
Coochin Creek	Coochin Creek	Coochin Creek

Gagalba is a developing locality in the Sunshine Coast Region, Queensland, Australia. When suburban development is complete, Gagalba will have approximately 6,000 homes with a secondary school and two primary schools.

== History ==
Gagalba is situated in the Gubbi Gubbi (Kabi) traditional Aboriginal country. The name Gagalba means shining place in the Gubbi Gubbi and Butchulla (Badtjala) languages.

On 14 June 2019, parts of the localities of Bells Creek and Meridan Plains were excised to create the localities of Banya, Corbould Park, Gagalba and Nirimba to accommodate future suburban growth in the Caloundra South Priority Development Area.

== Demographics ==
The population of Gagalba was not separately reported in the 2021 Australian census. It was included in the 2021 census data for its neighbouring locality Bells Creek.

== Education ==
As at 2025, there are no schools in Gagalba. The nearest government primary schools are Nirimba State Primary School in Nirimba to the north and Landsborough State School in Landsborough to the north-west. The nearest government secondary school is Baringa State Secondary College in Baringa to the north.
