= Bells Creek, Queensland =

Bells Creek
- Suburb
- Interactive map of Bells Creek
- Coordinates: 26.8286°S 153.0780°E
- Country: Australia
- State: Queensland
- LGA: Sunshine Coast Region
- Location: 9.2 km (5.7 mi) SW of Caloundra; 29.1 km (18.1 mi) SSE of Nambour; 88.1 km (54.7 mi) N of Brisbane

Government
  - State electorate: Caloundra
  - Federal division: Fisher

Area
  - Total: 5.6 km^{2} (2.2 sq mi)

Population
  - Total: 343 (2021 census)
  - Density: 61.3/km^{2} (158.6/sq mi)
- Time zone: UTC+10:00 (AEST)
- Postcode: 4551
- County: Canning
- Parish: Bribie
Suburbs around Bells Creek
Aura Central; Baringa	Baringa	Caloundra West
Aura Central	Bells Creek	Pelican Waters
Gagalba	Coochin Creek	Coochin Creek

Bells Creek is a rural locality in the Sunshine Coast Region, Queensland, Australia. In the 2021 census, Bells Creek had a population of 343 people.

== Geography ==
Bells Creek is located 6 kilometres (4 mi) south-west of Caloundra. The locality covers a small area surrounding the confluence of the northern and southern branches of Bells Creek (the suburb's namesake). The entirety of its western boundary runs along Bells Creek Arterial Road, while its eastern boundary is largely defined by Bells Creek. The northern part of the suburbs is largely undeveloped, while the land in the south is mostly freehold agricultural land.

The locality historically covered significantly more area than its current extent, stretching across the Bruce Highway and up to the Mooloolah River National Park (which was located in the north-western corner of the locality). The south-western corner of the locality formed part of the Beerwah State Forest boundary. This area was of similar character to the current locality, though much of it has since been developed.

== History ==
The locality takes its name from the creek, which in turn was named after Mary Alice Bell (later Eglington) who bought Portion 29 south of the creek. She was the governess of the children of explorer and pioneer William Landsborough. The creek had previously been known as Kelaher Creek and by the Indigenous people as Tooringoor.

On 18 August 2017, the north-eastern part of Bells Creek was excised to create the locality of Baringa to accommodate future suburban growth in the Caloundra South Priority Development Area.

On 14 June 2019, parts of the locality (along with parts of nearby Meridan Plains) were again excised, forming the localities of Banya, Corbould Park, Gagalba and Nirimba (again to accommodate future suburban growth in the Caloundra South Priority Development Area).

Notre Dame College, a Catholic primary-and-secondary school, opened in January 2025, initially admitting primary students in Years Prep to 3 and secondary students in Year 7. It is on a 7.9-hectare (20-acre) site and will be able accommodate 1,836 students once fully operational in 2030 .

On 24 July 2026, the part of Bells Creek to the west of Bells Creek Arterial Road was excised to create the locality of Aura Central. This reduced the locality's area from 8.1 km² to just 5.6 km², and removed Notre Dame College (the only school in the locality).

== Demographics ==
In the 2011 census, Bells Creek had a population of 317 people. The population was 52.1% female and 47.9% male. The median age of the Bells Creek population was 32 years, 5 years below the national median of 37. 79.6% of people living in Bells Creek were born in Australia. The other top responses for country of birth were New Zealand 3.8%, England 3.5%, Scotland 1.9%, Samoa 1.9%, United States of America 1.6%. 89.8% of people spoke only English at home; the next most common languages were 1.9% Arabic, 1.3% Afrikaans.

In the 2016 census, Bells Creek had a population of 94 people.

In the 2021 census, Bells Creek had a population of 343 people. This included the populations of neighbouring newly created localities of Banya and Gagalba.

== Education ==
There are no schools in Bells Creek.

Notre Dame College, a Catholic primary-and-secondary school at 20 Festival Street (26.8291°S 153.0634°E), was established within the locality. However, in July 2026 it became part of the newly-established locality of Aura Central.

The nearest government primary schools are Baringa State Primary School in neighbouring Baringa to the north, Nirimba State Primary School in neighbouring Nirimba to the west, and Landsborough State School in Landsborough to the west. The nearest government secondary schools are Baringa State Secondary College in Baringa and Beerwah State High School in Beerwah to the south-west.
