= Corbould Park, Queensland =

Corbould Park
- Suburb
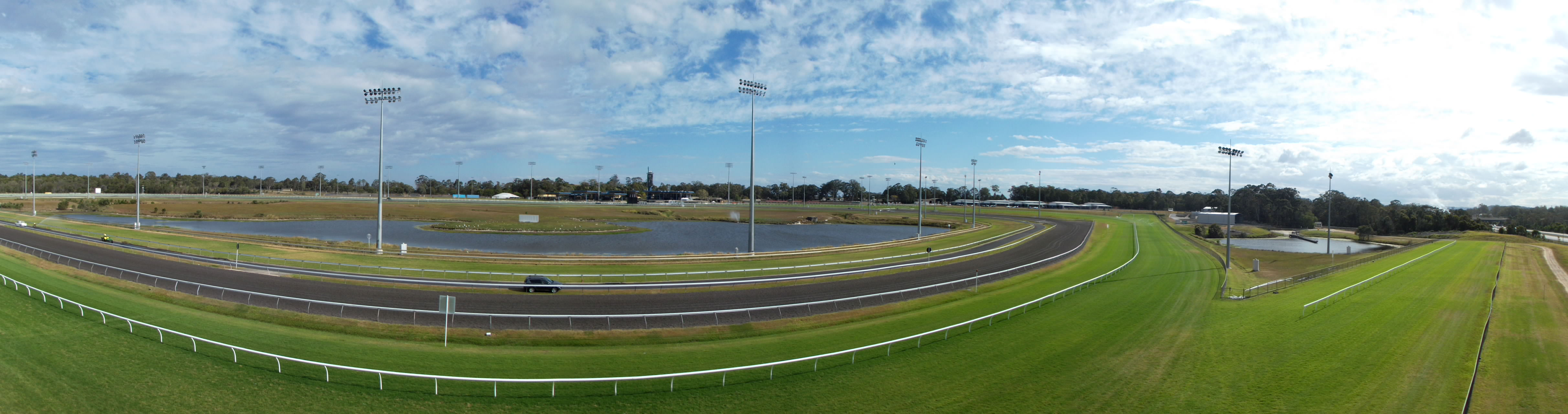
- Corbould Park Racecourse, 2013

- Interactive map of Corbould Park
- Coordinates: 26.7963°S 153.0586°E
- Country: Australia
- State: Queensland
- LGA: Sunshine Coast Region
- Location: 7.6 km (4.7 mi) W of Caloundra; 88.8 km (55.2 mi) N of Brisbane
- Established: 2019

Government
  - State electorate: Caloundra
  - Federal division: Fisher

Area
  - Total: 9.5 km^{2} (3.7 sq mi)

Population
  - Total: 0 (2021 census)
  - Density: 0.00/km^{2} (0.00/sq mi)
- Time zone: UTC+10:00 (AEST)
- Postcode: 4551
Suburbs around Corbould Park
Glenview	Meridan Plains	Little Mountain
Landsborough	Corbould Park	Little Mountain
Landsborough	Nirimba	Baringa

Corbould Park is a locality in the Sunshine Coast Region, Queensland, Australia. In the 2021 census, Corbould Park had "no people or a very low population".

== Geography ==
Caloundra Road runs along part of the northern boundary.

The northern part of the locality is occupied by the Corbould Park Racecourse. While much of the locality is undeveloped land, there are two industrial areas.

== History ==
Corbould Park is situated in the Gubbi Gubbi (Kabi) traditional Aboriginal country.

On 14 June 2019, parts of the localities of Bells Creek and Meridan Plains were excised to create the localities of Banya, Corbould Park, Gagalba and Nirimba to accommodate future suburban growth in the Caloundra South Priority Development Area.

The locality is named after grazier and philanthropist Harold Edward (Ted) Corbould.

== Demographics ==
In the 2021 census (the first for locality), Corbould Park had "no people or a very low population".

== Education ==
There are no schools in Corbould Park. The nearest government primary schools are Meridan State College (in neighbouring Meridan Plains to the north) and Baringa State Primary School (in neighbouring Baringa to the south-east). The nearest government secondary school is Meridan State College (in neighbouring Meridan Plains) and Baringa State Secondary College (in neighbouring Baringa).

== Amenities ==
Corbould Park Racecourse is in the north of the locality. It is operated by the Sunshine Coast Turf Club.
