= Caloundra (disambiguation) =

Caloundra is an urban centre in the southern Sunshine Coast region of Queensland, Australia.

Caloundra may also refer to:

- City of Caloundra, former local government area until 2008 in Caloundra, Queensland
- Caloundra (suburb), central business district in Caloundra, Queensland
- Electoral district of Caloundra, an electoral district of the Legislative Assembly of Queensland
