= Nirimba, Queensland =

Nirimba
- Suburb
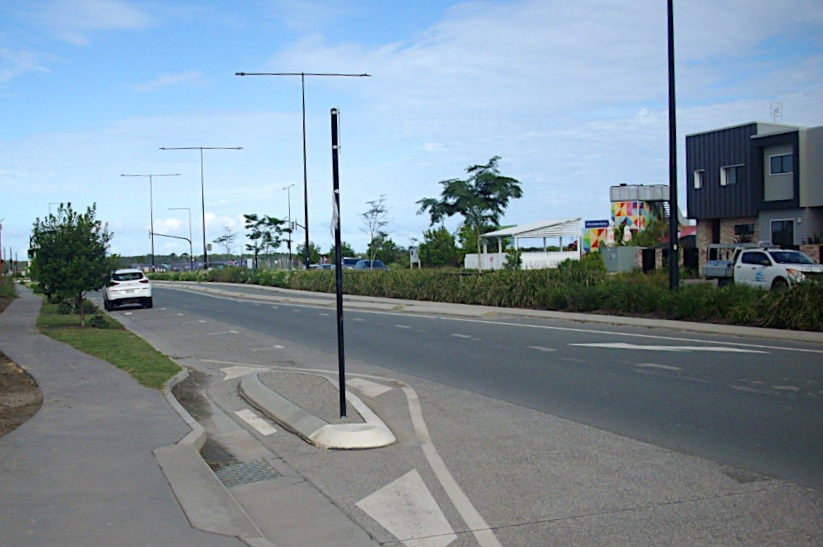
- Central Avenue, Nirimba

- Interactive map of Nirimba
- Coordinates: 26.8175°S 153.0494°E
- Country: Australia
- State: Queensland
- LGA: Sunshine Coast Region
- Location: 15.1 km (9.4 mi) NE of Beerwah; 15.8 km (9.8 mi) E of Landsborough; 25.8 km (16.0 mi) SW of Caloundra; 83.1 km (51.6 mi) N of Brisbane
- Established: 2019

Government
  - State electorate: Caloundra
  - Federal division: Fisher

Area
  - Total: 4.0 km^{2} (1.5 sq mi)

Population
  - Total: 2,229 (2021 census)
  - Density: 557/km^{2} (1,443/sq mi)
- Time zone: UTC+10:00 (AEST)
- Postcode: 4551
Suburbs around Nirimba
Landsborough	Corbould Park	Baringa
Landsborough	Nirimba	Bells Creek
Landsborough	Banya	Bells Creek

Nirimba is a developing locality in the Sunshine Coast Region, Queensland, Australia. It was created in 2019. In the 2021 census, Nirimba had a population of 2,229 people.

== Geography ==
Nirimba is identified as an area in transition. Historically a rural area, it is now being developed as a suburb.

== History ==
Nirimba is situated in the Gubbi Gubbi (Kabi) traditional Aboriginal country. The name Nirimba means middle in the Kabi language.

On 14 June 2019, parts of the localities of Bells Creek and Meridan Plains were excised to create the localities of Banya, Corbould Park, Gagalba and Nirimba to accommodate future suburban growth in the Caloundra South Priority Development Area.

Nirimba State Primary School opened in January 2022 with 160 foundation students.

== Demographics ==
In the 2021 census, Nirimba had a population of 2,229 people. This was the first census for Nirimba.

== Education ==
Nirimba State Primary School is a government primary (Prep–6) school for boys and girls at 100 Park Avenue (26.8222°S 153.0540°E). The school opened in 2022 with an initial enrolment of 160 students with a maximum capacity of 1,200 students.

The nearest government secondary schools are Baringa State Secondary College in neighbouring Baringa to the north-east, Meridan State College in Meridan Plains to the north and Beerwah State High School in Beerwah to the south-west.
