= Little Mountain, Queensland =

Little Mountain
- Suburb
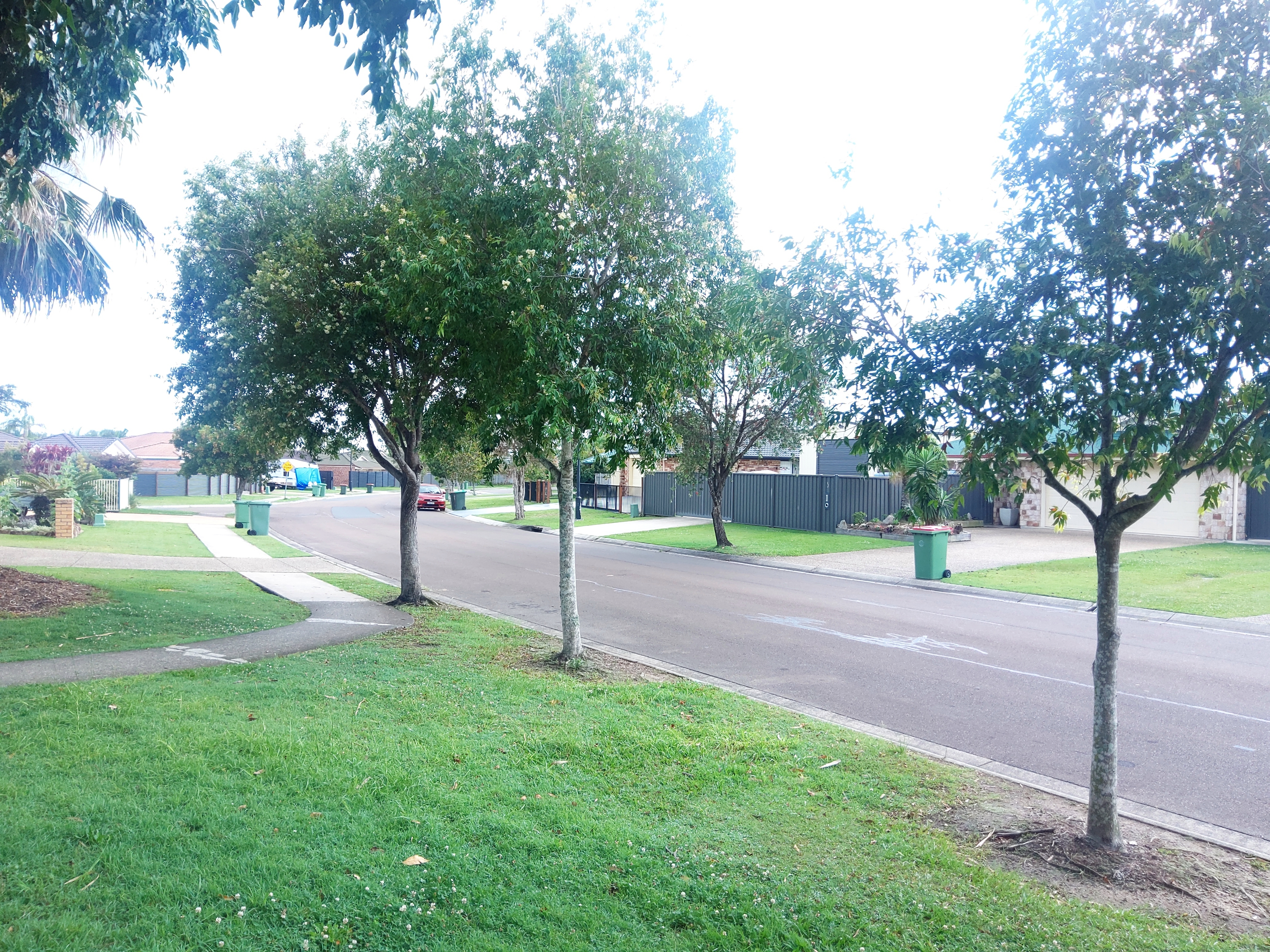
- Springs Drive, 2021

- Interactive map of Little Mountain
- Coordinates: 26.7855°S 153.0927°E
- Country: Australia
- State: Queensland
- City: Sunshine Coast
- LGA: Sunshine Coast Region
- Location: 5.5 km (3.4 mi) NW of Caloundra CBD; 86.6 km (53.8 mi) N of Brisbane

Government
  - State electorates: Caloundra; Kawana
  - Federal division: Fisher

Area
  - Total: 7.6 km^{2} (2.9 sq mi)

Population
  - Total: 11,068 (2021 census)
  - Density: 1,456/km^{2} (3,772/sq mi)
- Time zone: UTC+10:00 (AEST)
- Postcode: 4551
- County: Canning
- Parish: Bribie
Suburbs around Little Mountain
Meridan Plains	Meridan Plains	Currimundi
Corbould Park	Little Mountain	Aroona
Baringa	Caloundra West	Caloundra West

Little Mountain is a suburb of Caloundra in the Sunshine Coast Region, Queensland, Australia. In the 2021 census, Little Mountain had a population of 11,068 people.

== Geography ==
Little Mountain is 5.5 kilometres (3 mi) by road north-west of Caloundra CBD. Caloundra Road runs through from west to south-east.

== Demographics ==
In the 2016 census, Little Mountain had a population of 10,212 people.

In the 2021 census, Little Mountain had a population of 11,068 people.

== Amenities ==
The Sunshine Coast Regional Council operates a mobile library service which visits Karawatha Drive near the shopping centre.

== Education ==
There are no schools in Little Mountain. The nearest government primary schools are Meridan State College in neighbouring Meridan Plains to the north, Baringa State Primary School in neighbouring Baringa to the south, and Golden Beach State School in Golden Beach to the south-east. The nearest government secondary schools are Meridan State College and Caloundra State High School in Caloundra CBD.
