= Caloundra =

- Town
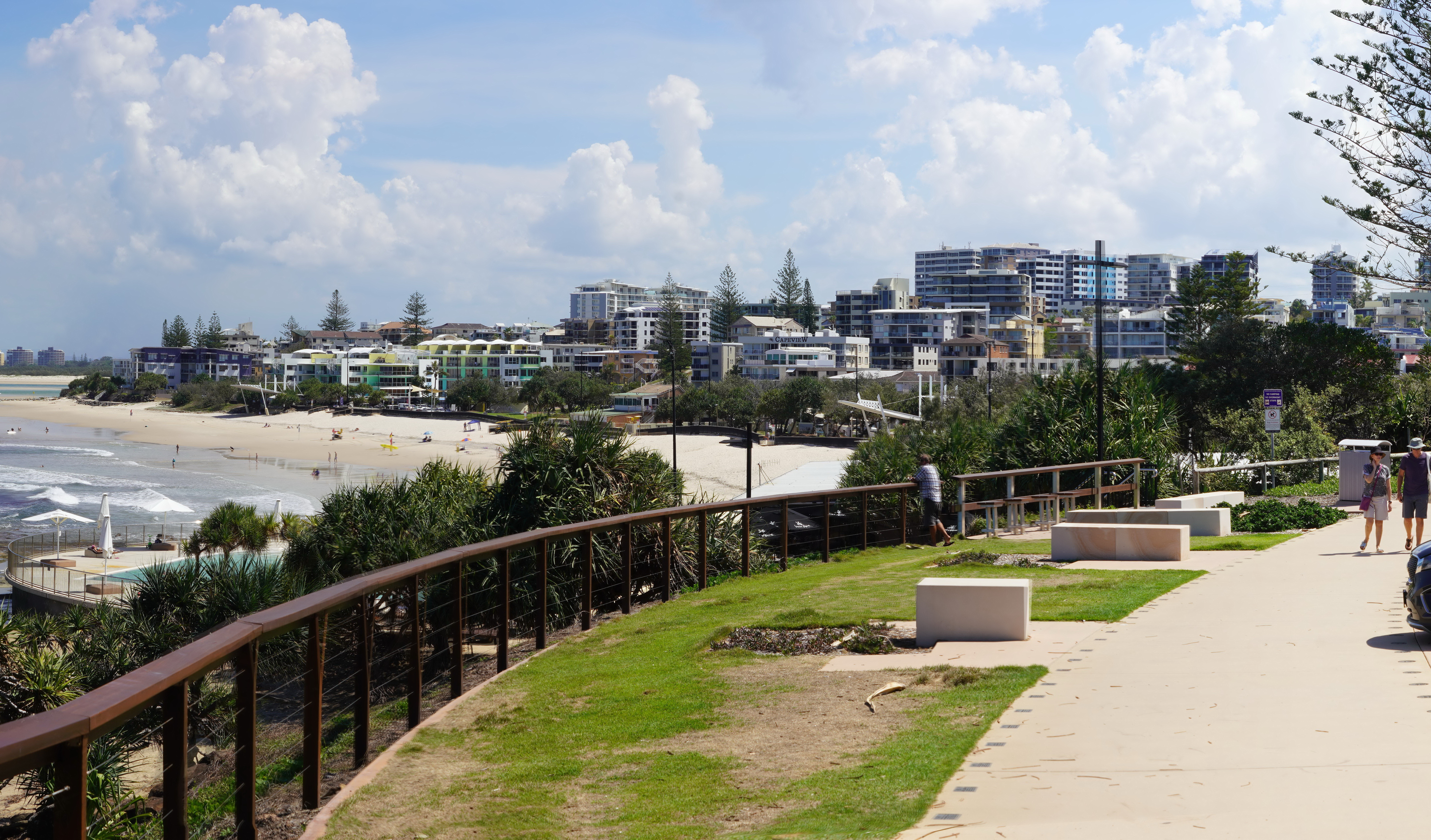
- King's Beach

- Interactive map of Caloundra
- Coordinates: 26.8047°S 153.1338°E
- Country: Australia
- State: Queensland
- City: Sunshine Coast
- LGA: Sunshine Coast Region
- Location: 29.3 km (18.2 mi) SE of Nambour; 91.3 km (56.7 mi) N of Brisbane

Government
  - State electorates: Caloundra; Kawana
  - Federal division: Fisher

Area
  - Total: 113.1 km^{2} (43.7 sq mi)

Population
  - Total: 96,305 (2021 census)
  - Density: 851.5/km^{2} (2,205.4/sq mi)
- Time zone: UTC+10:00 (AEST)
- Postcode: 4551
- Website: Caloundra

Caloundra (/kəˈlaʊndrʌ/ kə-LOWN-druh) is a coastal town in the Sunshine Coast Region, Queensland, Australia. In the 2021 census, the town of Caloundra had a population of 96,305 people.

== Geography ==
Caloundra is 90 kilometres (55.9 mi) north of the Brisbane central business district. Caloundra is accessible from Landsborough railway station, 21 kilometres (13.0 mi) away, and the Caloundra bus station.

Bribie Island is located across the Pumicestone Passage to the south.

Caloundra marks the coastal northern extent of the Moreton Bay Marine Park.

== History ==
Caloundra lies within the Aboriginal Gubbi Gubbi (Kabi Kabi, Cabbee, Carbi, Gabi Gabi) language region. The name Caloundra is from the Gubbi Gubbi language Cullowundoor with Kal Owen meaning 'beech tree' (Gmelina leichhardtii) and Dha meaning 'place'.

Caloundra Head was previously known as Petrie Point and Point Wickham (or Wickham Point). Point Wickham takes its name from John Clements Wickham, who did a hydrographic survey of the northern section of Moreton Bay in 1846 and was later the Government Resident of Moreton Bay from 1853 to 1859. Point Wickham was in use by 1860, where it was noted on official maps. In an 1892 map it is named "Caloundra Head (Wickham Point)" and at some time later the use of Caloundra Head became dominant and the use of the name Point Wickham seems to have discontinued.

In 1875, Robert Bulcock, an English immigrant who founded a Brisbane newspaper and later represented the Brisbane electorate of Enoggera in the Legislative Assembly of Queensland from 1885 until 1888, bought 277 acres (1.12 km^{2}) of land in the region. A town was surveyed in the 1870s, and land sales commenced in 1883. The first allotments of land in Caloundra were advertised for public auction on 28 August 1883. The map states 'the land is of a sandstone nature, undulating and ridgy, heavily timbered with Gum, Bloodwood, Tea-tree and Oak'. A 1907 map shows several sections from George Street to Ernest St advertised for auction on 7 January 1907 by the Government Land Office.

With its proximity to beaches, the area became popular with tourists and a number of hotels and guest houses were set up to accommodate them.

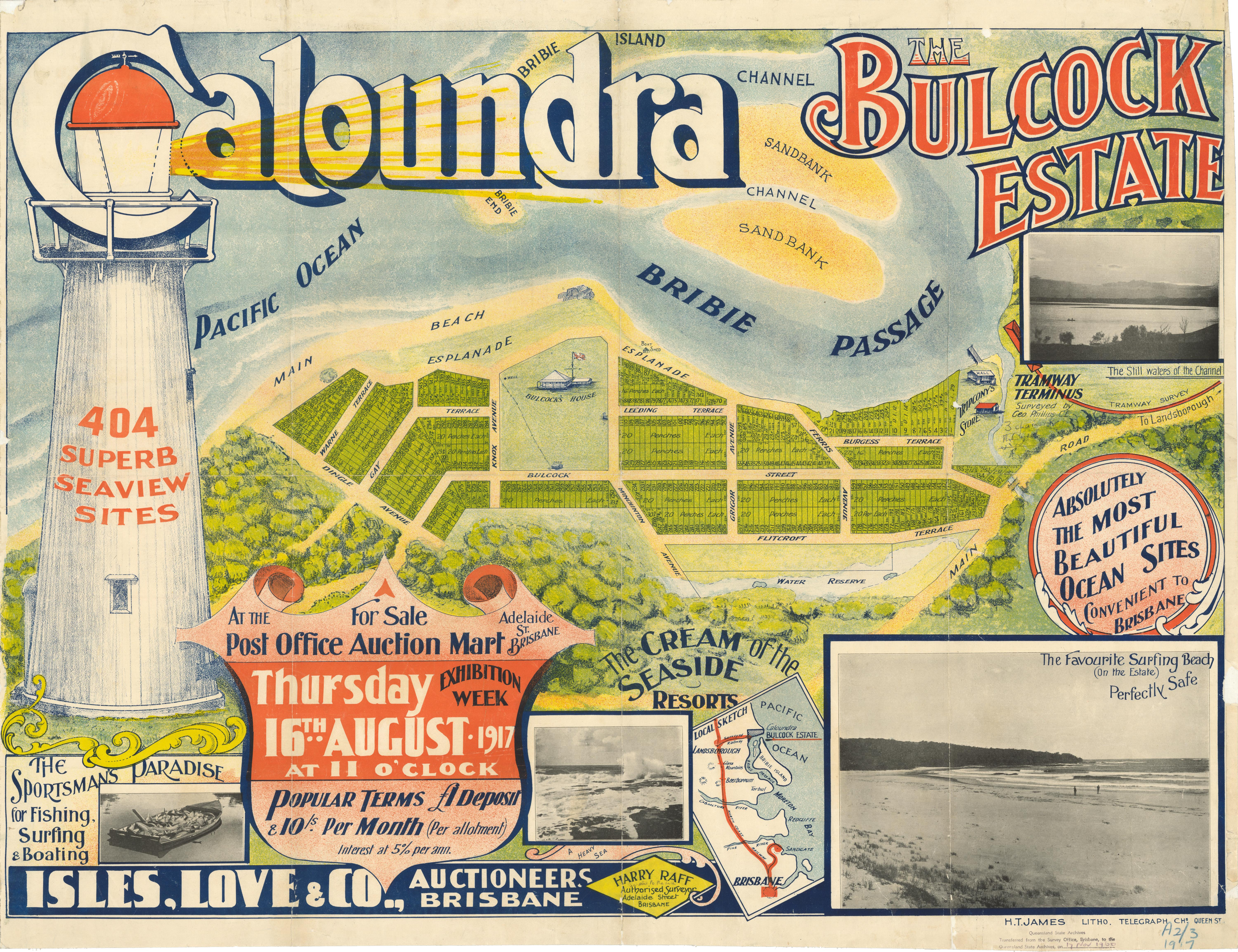
Real estate subdivision of Bulcock Beach, 1917

In 1917, Bulcock's son, Robert Bulcock Jr, who was a councillor in the Shire of Landsborough, subdivided part of the land into 404 lots. This area became known as Bulcock Beach. 404 allotments of 'Bulcock Estate' were advertised for auction on 16 August 1917 by Isle, Love and Co, auctioneers, with an edge of the Estate mapped as adjacent to Tripcony's store and the Tramway terminus.

In 1919, 29 subdivided allotments of 'Caloundra Heads Estate' were advertised to be auctioned on 20 December 1919 by Cameron Bros. in Brisbane. A map advertising the auction shows the majority of blocks were on Albert Street between King Street and Kings Beach. Another undated map shows more blocks of this estate were advertised for auction on King Street towards Ernest Street.

On Saturday 29 December 1934, Caloundra Methodist Church was opened and dedicated by the President of the Methodist State Conference, C. C. Truman. It was the first church in Caloundra.

The Caloundra branch of the Queensland Country Women's Association was established in July 1937.

St Andrew's Anglican Church was dedicated on Sunday 22 January 1939 by Archbishop William Wand. The construction of the church had been strongly encouraged by Wand who holidayed at Caloundra with his friend Queensland Governor Leslie Wilson. The Governor also attended the church's dedication. On 10 December 1966 the foundation stone of the new church was laid Archbishop Philip Strong, who opened and dedicated the new church on 8 December 1967. The new church was consecrated in 1974.

The first female councillor was Miriam Westaway, who represented Division 5 from 29 April 1961 to 30 March 1973. She was one of the first teachers at Caloundra State School. She was active in community groups such as the RSL Women's Auxiliary and a founder of the Caloundra Branch of the Queensland Country Women's Association and the local branch of the Red Cross.

During World War II, the area became key to Australian defence due to defensive positions along the beaches. Radar stations and machine gun pits were mounted, and Australian and US armed forces came to the area. From the early 1950s onwards, Caloundra experienced a boom in development and population, and by 1968, it had come to dominate the Shire of Landsborough so completely that the council chambers were relocated to Caloundra.

In 1971, Aboriginal nurse Isobelle Mary Ferguson, along with her second husband Francis Kent, bought Aminya Nursing Home in Caloundra. They expanded it and sold it in 1974, with Ferguson continuing to work there as matron (Kent) until her retirement in 1986. Ferguson was the daughter of Indigenous leader and activist Bill Ferguson, and had herself been active in the Indigenous rights movement in New South Wales in the 1960s.

The Caloundra Library opened in 1986 with a major refurbishment in 2017.

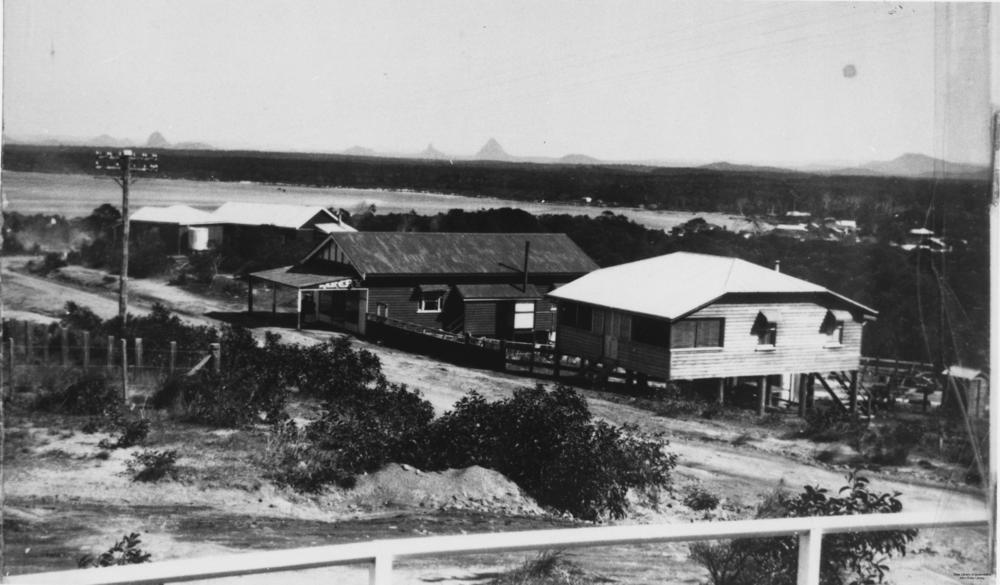
Caloundra in 1934

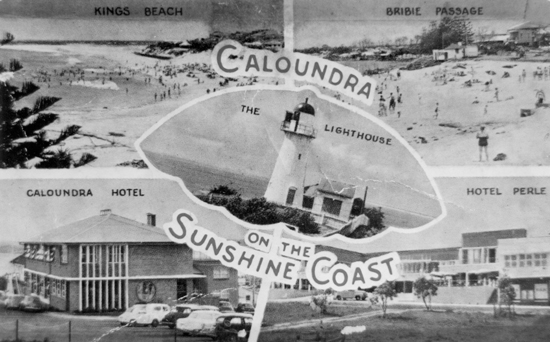
Postcard promoting Caloundra in the 1950s

== Demographics ==
In the 1933 census, the locality of Caloundra had a population of 271 people.

In the 2016 census, the suburb of Caloundra had a population of 3,917 people.

In the 2021 census, the town of Caloundra had a population of 96,305 people.

== Heritage listings ==
Caloundra has a number of heritage-listed sites, including:

- Tripcony Hibiscus Caravan Park, Bowman Road, Caloundra
- Caloundra Lighthouses, 6 Arthur Street and 3 Canberra Terrace, Kings Beach
- Kings Beach Bathing Pavilion, Ormonde Terrace, Kings Beach

== Suburbs ==
Caloundra is not strictly defined, but the boundary used by the Australian Bureau of Statistics for census purposes and the urban zone defined by the Sunshine Coast Council (formerly the Caloundra City Council) almost exactly coincide. This region is bounded roughly by Currimundi Creek, Rainforest Drive and the Mooloolah River to the north, Beerwah State Forest and Bruce Highway to the west, the Pumicestone Passage (separating the area from Bribie Island) and the ocean to the east, and Bells Creek to the south. The central business district (CBD) for the area is located on Bulcock Street, Caloundra.

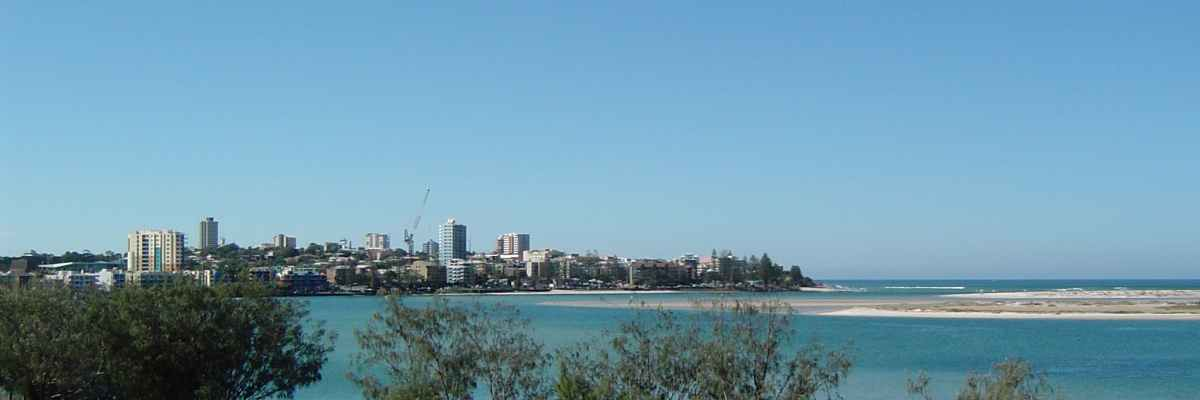
Panoramic view of Caloundra

The Caloundra urban centre consists of the following suburbs:

- Aroona
- Banya
- Baringa
- Battery Hill
- Bells Creek
- Caloundra (suburb)
- Caloundra West
- Corbould Park
- Currimundi (part)
- Dicky Beach
- Gagalba
- Golden Beach
- Kings Beach
- Little Mountain
- Nirimba
- Meridan Plains (part)
- Moffat Beach
- Pelican Waters
- Shelly Beach

== Climate ==
Climate data for Caloundra, Queensland
Month	Jan	Feb	Mar	Apr	May	Jun	Jul	Aug	Sep	Oct	Nov	Dec	Year
Record high °C (°F)	37.6 (99.7)	35.2 (95.4)	33.8 (92.8)	32.5 (90.5)	29.6 (85.3)	26.5 (79.7)	27.0 (80.6)	28.4 (83.1)	33.3 (91.9)	32.2 (90.0)	34.6 (94.3)	35.5 (95.9)	37.6 (99.7)
Mean daily maximum °C (°F)	27.6 (81.7)	27.2 (81.0)	26.4 (79.5)	24.6 (76.3)	22.2 (72.0)	19.8 (67.6)	19.3 (66.7)	20.3 (68.5)	22.3 (72.1)	24.1 (75.4)	25.4 (77.7)	27.0 (80.6)	23.8 (74.8)
Mean daily minimum °C (°F)	21.4 (70.5)	21.2 (70.2)	19.9 (67.8)	17.4 (63.3)	14.9 (58.8)	11.7 (53.1)	10.8 (51.4)	11.6 (52.9)	13.9 (57.0)	16.5 (61.7)	18.5 (65.3)	20.3 (68.5)	16.5 (61.7)
Record low °C (°F)	15.0 (59.0)	15.3 (59.5)	13.4 (56.1)	9.3 (48.7)	6.4 (43.5)	4.3 (39.7)	3.3 (37.9)	5.0 (41.0)	6.8 (44.2)	9.2 (48.6)	11.7 (53.1)	12.7 (54.9)	3.3 (37.9)
Average precipitation mm (inches)	174.0 (6.85)	202.4 (7.97)	208.0 (8.19)	172.9 (6.81)	170.3 (6.70)	102.4 (4.03)	89.2 (3.51)	60.8 (2.39)	54.3 (2.14)	81.1 (3.19)	113.3 (4.46)	147.4 (5.80)	1,578.3 (62.14)
Source: Bureau of Meteorology

== Transport ==
The region of the Sunshine Coast, including Caloundra, is serviced by the Sunshine Coast Airport, located at Marcoola. A smaller regional airport is also located at Caloundra.

Caloundra's suburbs are served by Kinetic Sunshine Coast, who operate the Caloundra bus station in Cooma Terrace. Bus routes 600, 602, 603, 605, 607, 609 connect Caloundra to Kawana Waters, Maroochydore, Buderim and Landsborough. Of residents aged 15 and over, 0.5% report using public transport to commute to work.

Landsborough railway station on the Sunshine Coast line has regular services to Roma Street railway station in Brisbane, operated by Queensland Rail. There are several bus companies providing coach services from Caloundra to Brisbane Airport.

== Industry ==
=== Tourism ===
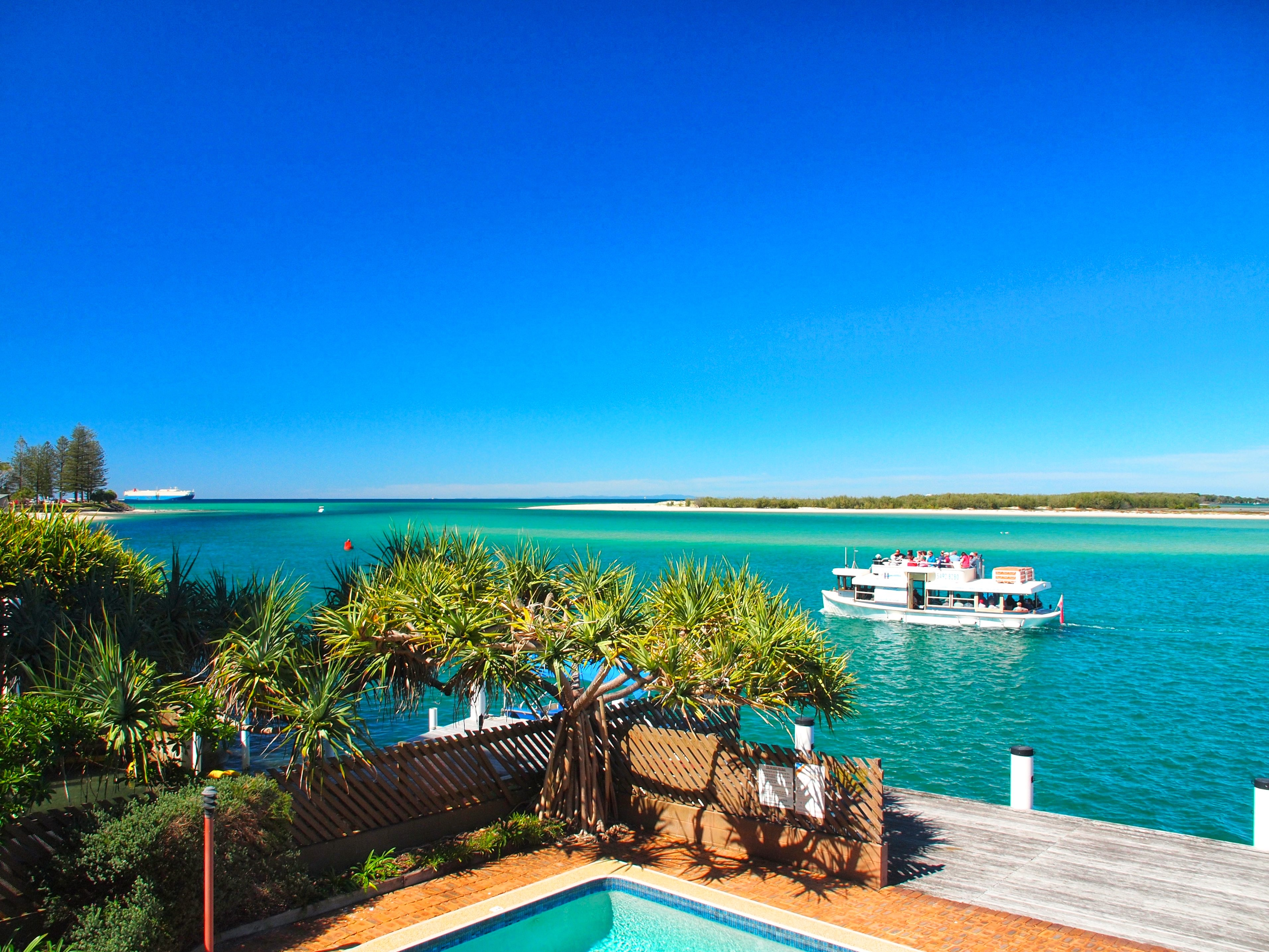
Bullcock Beach, Pumicestone Passage and the Northern tip of Bribie Island

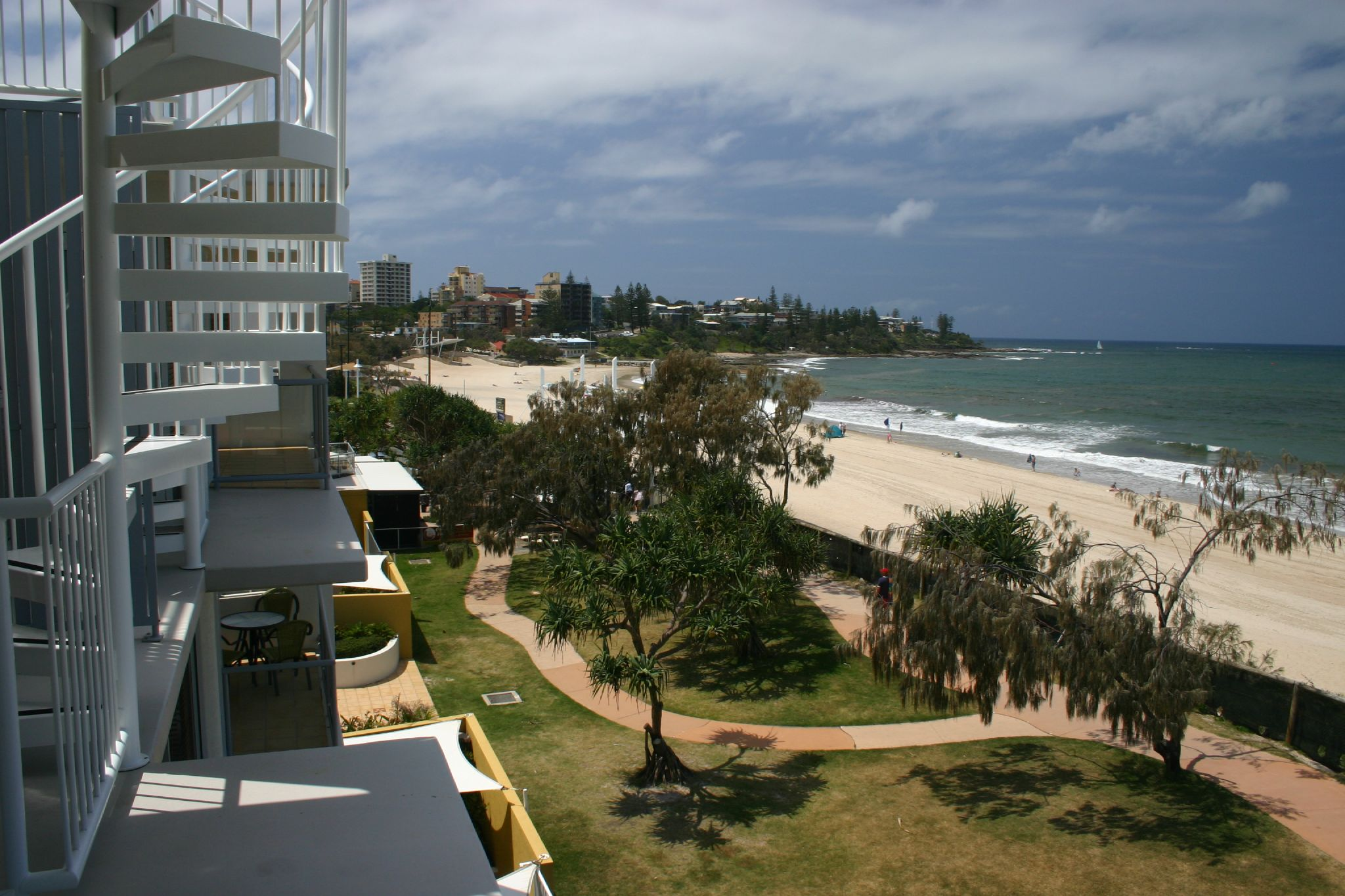
Apartments along Kings Beach

Caloundra has a variety of beaches, providing amenity to the local residents and tourists.

- Golden Beach is protected by Bribie Island to the east, and is used for swimming, windsurfing, boating and fishing. At low tide, Golden Beach and Bribie Island are relatively close.
- Bulcock Beach is a still water beach, has board-walks, piers and numerous restaurants, and is situated opposite the northern end of Bribie Island. The Des Dywer walking track is an oceanway that starts at Bulcock beach and follows the coastline on cliffs and boardwalks. The walking track ends at Moffat Beach north-east of Bulcock, and is about a one-hour walk. Bulcock Beach is patrolled by volunteer lifesavers from Ithaca–Caloundra City Life Saving Club.
- Kings Beach, named for Allan King who ran a guest house in the area in 1888, is the main beach of Caloundra. Kings Beach is patrolled all year round by Metropolitan – Caloundra Surf Life Saving Club and has a picnic and children's play area. Kings Beach also has a swimming pool which, whilst built to be separate from the ocean, is fed directly from seawater.
- Shelly Beach is not a swimming beach, with the danger of wild rough waves and rocks. However, the northern and southern ends are safer for more advanced or supervised swimmers. Locals often find these places appropriate as, not only is it remote from the crowds of the adjacent King's Beach, but local council laws allow dogs on the sand. On low tide, shells and rock pools can be found along the beach. Shelly is surrounded by residential housing with a maximum of five storeys.
- Moffat Beach is not a patrolled beach, but Dicky Beach, located one kilometre north, has a surf lifesaving club and is patrolled year-round. Moffat Beach is surrounded by residential housing, cafes, a post office, a newsagent, parkland and apartments.
- The surf beaches are Kings Beach and Dicky Beach which commence at the eastern end of Bulcock Beach, namely
  - Happy Valley (full east/south-east exposure) – officially Happy Valley is part of and shown on maps as Bulcock Beach.
  - Kings Beach (E/SE)
  - Shelly Beach (E/NE)
  - Moffat Beach (E/NE)
  - Dicky Beach (E/NE)
- On Caloundra's outskirts is Aussie World, located at the Glenview turnoff on the Bruce Highway.
- Corbould Park Racetrack – home of Sunshine Coast Turf Club which holds an important race meet during the Queensland Winter Racing Carnival, with the Group 3 Sunshine Coast Guineas and Listed Caloundra Cup.

== Amenities ==
The Sunshine Coast Council operates a public library at 8 Omrah Avenue.

The Caloundra branch of the Queensland Country Women's Association meets at 17 Kalinga Street.

St Andrew's Anglican Church is at 46 Upper Gay Terrace, Kings Beach (26.8032°S 153.1381°E). Some of the church's locum staff of retired priests are part of the Progressive Christianity movement. Caloundra Uniting Church also has links to the Progressive Christianity movement.

== Awards ==
Caloundra has won the Australian Tidy Town Award in 2012. The Queensland Tourism Industry Council named Caloundra the 2023 Queensland Top Tourism Town.

== Notable residents ==
- Robert Bulcock, pastoralist and Queensland politician
- James C. Moffat, chemist and pastoralist
