= Caloundra bus station =

Bus station in Queensland, Australia

Caloundra
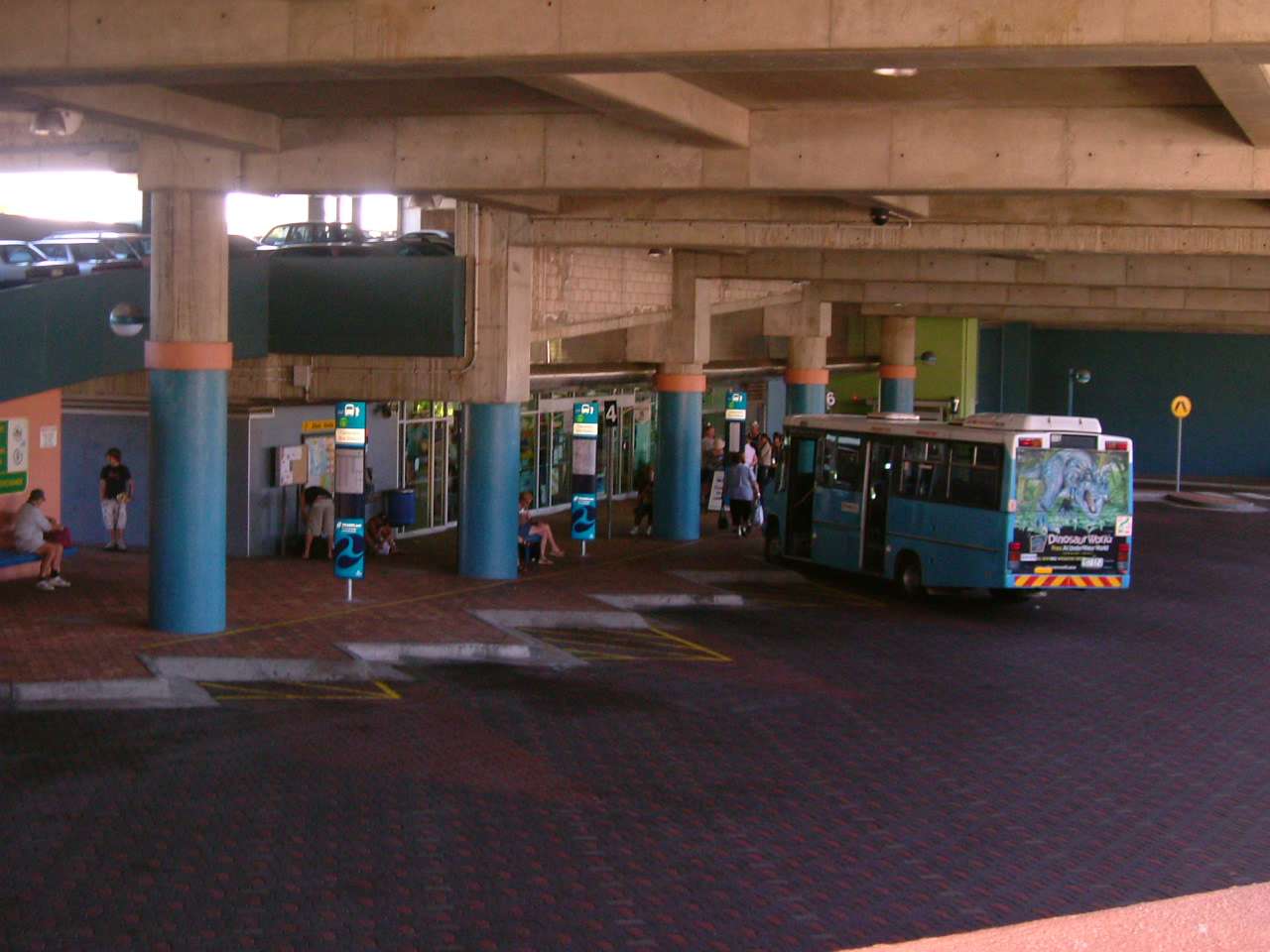
- Caloundra bus station in October 2006

General information
- Location: 23 Cooma Terrace, Caloundra, Queensland; Australia
- Coordinates: 26°48′21.08″S 153°07′58.38″E
- Owner: Sunshine Coast Regional Council
- Operator: Translink
- Platforms: 1
- Bus stands: 4

Construction
- Accessible: Yes

History
- Opened: 16 April 1992; 34 years ago
Location

Caloundra is a bus station operated by Translink. It opened in 1992 and serves the Sunshine Coast suburb of Caloundra. It is a ground level station, featuring one side platform with four bus stands.

Located in Cooma Terrace, Caloundra, the interchange features an air-conditioned waiting room. A two-storey car park is located above the bus station.

== Services ==
Kinetic Sunshine Coast operate six routes via Caloundra bus station:

- 600: to Maroochydore via Mooloolaba
- 602: to Maroochydore via Mountain Creek
- 603: Bellavista to Corbould Park
- 605: to Landsborough station
- 607: to University of the Sunshine Coast
- 609: to Pelican Waters
