= Meridan Plains, Queensland =

Meridan Plains
- Suburb
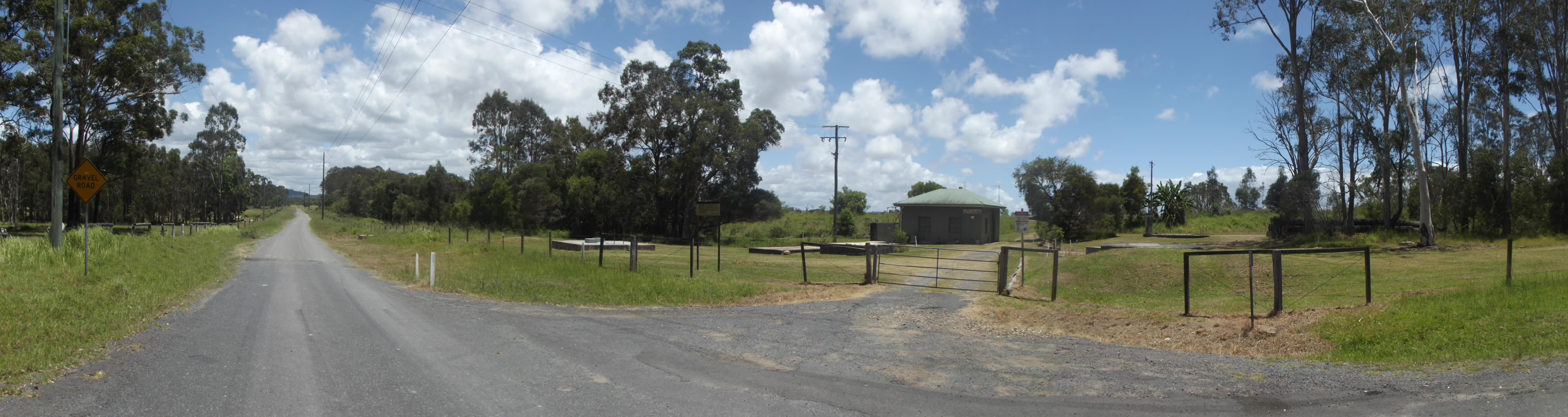
- Meridan Plains, 2015

- Interactive map of Meridan Plains
- Coordinates: 26.7633°S 153.0788°E
- Country: Australia
- State: Queensland
- City: Caloundra
- Location: 7.9 km (4.9 mi) N of Caloundra; 18.3 km (11.4 mi) S of Maroochydore; 28.8 km (17.9 mi) SE of Nambour; 94.1 km (58.5 mi) N of Brisbane

Area
  - Total: 19.0 km^{2} (7.3 sq mi)

Population
  - Total: 4,589 (SAL 2021)
- Time zone: UTC+10:00 (AEST)
- Postcode: 4551
Suburbs around Meridan Plains
Palmview	Palmview	Birtinya
Glenview	Meridan Plains	Currimundi
Corbould Park	Little Mountain	Aroona

Meridan Plains is a locality on the north-western edge of the Caloundra urban area in the Sunshine Coast Region, Queensland, Australia. Traditionally a rural area, the locality is attracting residential development from the expansion of Caloundra. In the 2021 census, Meridan Plains had a population of 4,589 people.

== Geography ==
Meridan Plains is 8 kilometres (5 miles) west-northwest of Caloundra. A large portion of the western boundary follows the Mooloolah River, while a small section aligns with the Bruce Highway. Caloundra Road passes through from west to south-east.

== History ==
Meridan Plains is named either using a corruption of a Kabi language word meaning place of kangaroos or dingoes, or after the birthplace of John Westaway in Devonshire, England.

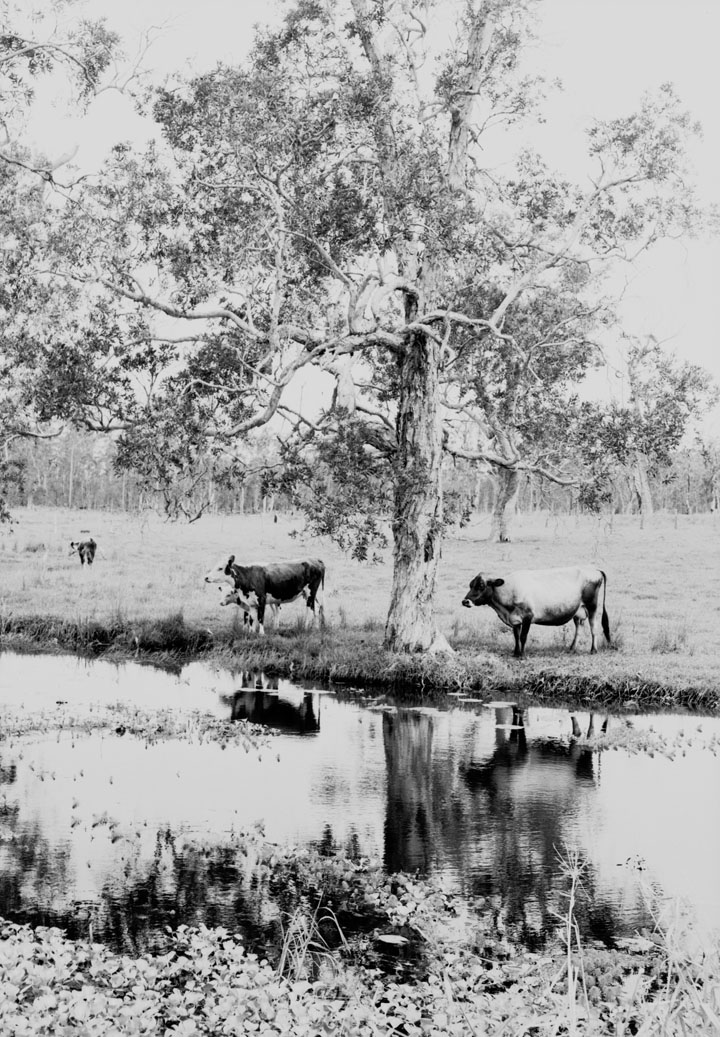
Westaway's cattle property "Meridan Plains"

In early 1861 the tender of Edmund Lander was accepted, by the Commissioner for Crown Lands, for the 25-square-mile (65-square-kilometre) pastoral run of Mooloolah Plains in the Wide Bay and Burnett District. A year later the lease was transferred to John Westaway.

Lander went on to select 80 acres (32 hectares) in 1869 on the main coach road between Brisbane and Gympie at the Mooloolah Bridge. On this property the Mooloolah Post Office was conducted.

A postal receiving office was established at Mooloolah Plains in charge of Mr. W. H. Westaway in 1874, and in 1890 the office's name was changed to Meridan.

Pacific Lutheran College opened on 26 September 2001.

The primary campus of Meridan State College opened on 1 January 2006, junior secondary in 2008 and the senior secondary campus in 2010.

On 14 June 2019 the boundaries of the localities of Bells Creek and Meridan Plains were reduced to create the new localities of Banya, Corbould Park, Gagalba and Nirimba to accommodate future suburban growth in the Caloundra South Priority Development Area.

== Demographics ==
In the 2016 census, Meridan Plains had a population of 3,675 people.

In the 2021 census, Meridan Plains had a population of 4,589 people.

== Education ==
Meridan State College is a government primary and secondary (Prep-12) school for boys and girls at 214 Parklands Boulevard (26.7737°S 153.1028°E). In 2017, the school had an enrolment of 2,711 students with 194 teachers (182 full-time equivalent) and 94 non-teaching staff (64 full-time equivalent). It includes a special education program.

Pacific Lutheran College is a private primary and secondary (Prep-12) school for boys and girls at Woodlands Boulevard (26.7565°S 153.1053°E). In 2017, the school had an enrolment of 948 students with 75 teachers (69 full-time equivalent) and 60 non-teaching staff (45 full-time equivalent).
