= Caloundra Airport =

Airport in Queensland, Australia

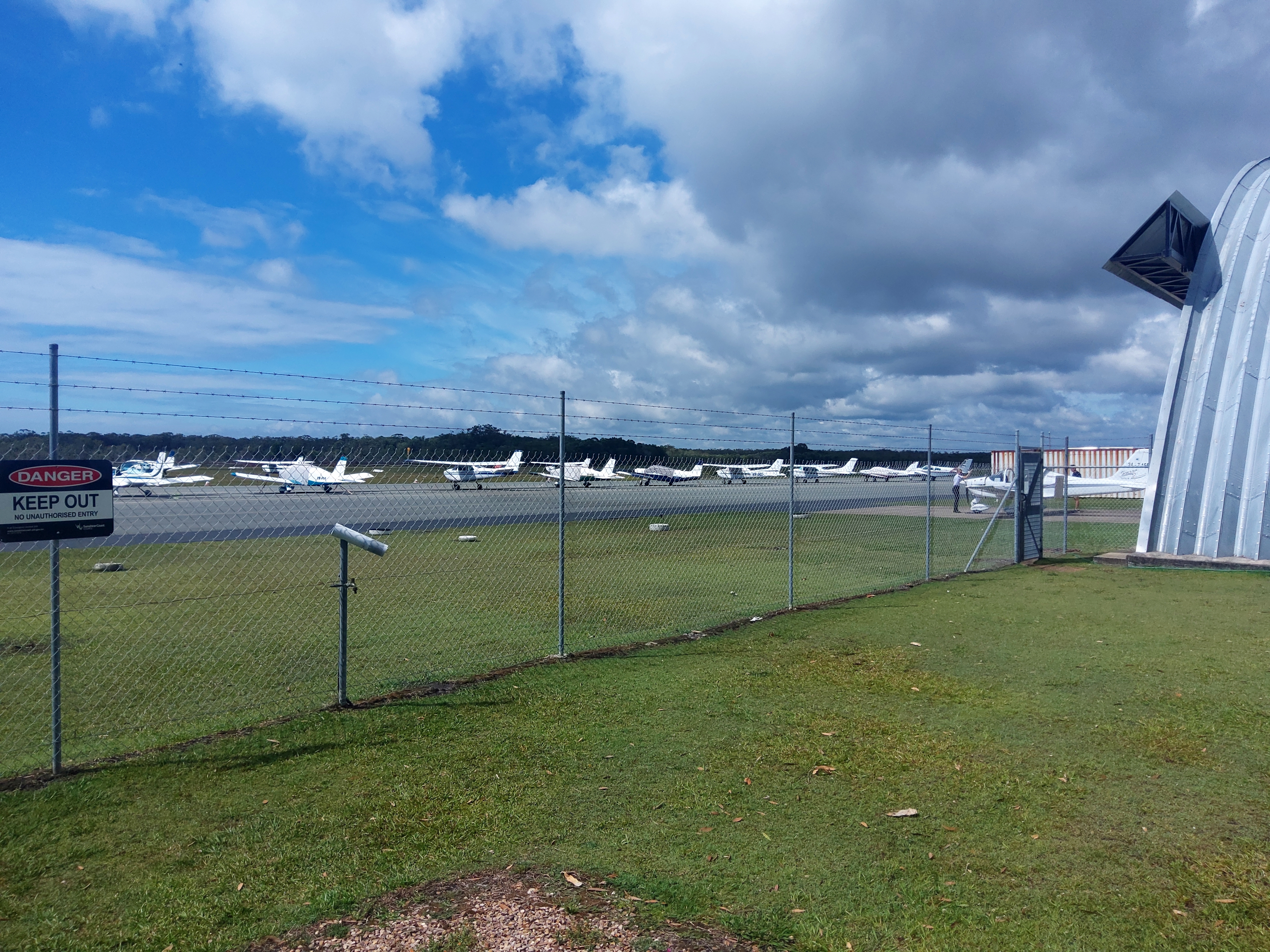
- Planes on the apron, 2021
- IATA: CUD; ICAO: YCDR

Summary
- Airport type: Public
- Owner: Sunshine Coast Council
- Operator: Sunshine Coast Airports
- Serves: Caloundra, Sunshine Coast
- Location: Caloundra West, Queensland, Australia
- Opened: 1931 (95 years ago)
- Elevation AMSL: 38 ft / 12 m
- Coordinates: 26°48′06″S 153°06′18″E

Map
- Location in Queensland

Runways
Direction	Length		Surface
Direction	m	ft	Surface
05/23	795	2,608	Asphalt
12/30	795	2,608	Asphalt

Statistics (2011)
- Aircraft operations: approx 40,000 p.a.
- Sources: AIP

Caloundra Airport (IATA: CUD, ICAO: YCDR) is a public general aviation airport located in Caloundra West serving the Sunshine Coast in the Australian state of Queensland. The airport is located on a 130 ha (320 acres) site, of which 74 ha (180 acres) is occupied by the current facilities. Further growth and expansion of the airport is limited by urban encroachment as much of the surrounding land has been developed into residential estates. The airport has been managed by Sunshine Coast Airports, a business unit of the Sunshine Coast Council which is also responsible for the operations of the Sunshine Coast Airport at Maroochydore since 2008.

== History ==
Early aircraft operations in the Caloundra area used the sandy beaches for takeoffs and landings; however, as early as 1927, community groups were calling for the construction of an airport. The current site was reserved as a landing ground in 1931. The modern airport facilities were built by the now defunct Landsborough Shire Council and were officially opened on 19 August 1972 by Premier Joh Bjelke-Petersen. New hangar facilities were constructed on airport land to accommodate the Queensland Air Museum in the 1980s.

On 19 August 2010, Sunshine Coast council voted to retain Caloundra Airport in the current location. Both council and the Queensland Government had proposed relocating the airport to allow the land to be sold and redeveloped. A report to council recommended the creation of a master plan, environmental and business strategy to secure the long-term future of the facility. Following this decision, consultation with aviation businesses and the release of a preliminary master plan called for a 400 m (1,300 ft) extension of runway 05/23 and expanded facilities for general aviation businesses. In September 2011, however, the state government approved a new housing estate at Caloundra South which will see new homes are built directly under the flight path for the airport, as close as 80 m (260 ft) from the runways. This caused delays in the tender process for leases at the site, and renewed uncertainty for businesses over their future tenure at Caloundra Airport.

In 2024, the Sunshine Coast Council announced construction of stage one of the Caloundra Aerospace Park development on land at the airport. The development was intended to diversify the local economy by encouraging aviation maintenance, repair and advanced manufacturing businesses to establish at the airport. It also provided an alternative site for aerospace businesses after the redevelopment of Sunshine Coast Airport constrained these uses.

== Operations ==
The airport is home to 19 businesses, providing 220 jobs for the local area. As well as aviation related services, the airport offers tourist attractions including skydiving, scenic flights and a museum. Several companies offer flight training for general aviation and recreational pilots including Inspire Aviation, GoFly Aviation and Airways Aviation Academy.

The Queensland Institute for Aviation Engineering's main campus has been located at the airport since 2000. The institute is an internationally accredited training provider for aircraft maintenance and engineering students.

Caloundra is one of two bases for Airways Aviation (formerly Chopperline Flight Training) (The other being Gold Coast Airport), a provider of flight training, maintenance and corporate charter services for helicopters and fixed wing aircraft. Airways Aviation also contribute to local tourism offering scenic flights and corporate transfers from the airport.

The Queensland Air Museum was established in 1973, moving to a permanent facility at Caloundra Airport on 14 June 1986 at the invitation of the Landsborough Shire Council. The museum is a tourist drawcard for the area, and since moving to Caloundra the collection has grown from five to over forty aircraft on display. Major exhibits include a GAF Canberra bomber, a DHC-4 Caribou as well as many smaller military and civilian types significant to aviation in Queensland. The museum now has a F-111C following the retirement of the aircraft from active service with the RAAF.

== Airport facilities ==
Caloundra airport has two sealed runways, 795 m × 18 m (2,608 ft × 59 ft). Only one runway is equipped with Pilot Controlled Lighting which can be turned on and off by radio as required. Fuel and aircraft maintenance facilities are available. There is no control tower and pilots are required to co-ordinate aircraft movements using a Common Traffic Advisory Frequency (CTAF). Circuit training for student pilots in not permitted after 2100 hours on weekdays and after last light on weekends as the airport is in a noise sensitive area. The nearest navigation aid for aircraft is the Maroochydore VOR installation 11.8 nautical miles (21.9 km; 13.6 mi) to the north.

As of June 2026 there are no airlines serving Caloundra and there are no plans for regular passenger flights in the immediate future.

== Accidents and incidents ==
- On 2 September 1990, a Jodel D11 aircraft, registration VH-FTY crashed into a swamp shortly after takeoff from Caloundra. The aircraft was destroyed by post-impact fire; however, the two occupants survived the crash with serious injuries. The pilot reported the engine lost power during the initial climb.
- On 15 August 2004, a Mooney M20 aircraft, registration VH-DXZ crashed into the ocean off Bokarina while approaching Caloundra Airport at night. The wreckage was not located for 13 days following the accident, which killed the pilot. A subsequent investigation by the Australian Transport Safety Bureau cited spatial disorientation and a lack of visual reference while over water in darkness as contributing factors in the crash.
- On 12 August 2017 a Sling 4 aircraft (built by the pilot), registration VH-BEG crashed and flipped on the runway. All four people on board were injured and taken to hospital, two of the passengers with minor injures; the remaining passenger and the pilot with serious injuries. The aircraft stalled, flipped and came to a halt upside-down above the runway.

== See also ==
- List of airports in Queensland
