= Stockland =

Australian property development company

Stockland Corporation Limited
- Type: Public
- Traded as: ASX: SGP
- Industry: Property development
- Founded: As Stocks & Holdings (1952; 74 years ago)
- Headquarters: 133 Castlereagh Street; Sydney, Australia
- Area served: Australia
- Key people: Albert Scheineberg, Ervin Graf (Founders) Tarun Gupta (Managing Director); Tom Pockett (Chairman)
- Products: Housing estate; shopping centre management; industrial precincts; manufactured housing communities
- Total assets: ▲ A$14.1 billion at 30 June 2013
- Website: www.stockland.com.au

Stockland Corporation Limited is one of the largest residential property development companies in Australia. According to Morningstar, Inc., it specializes in master-planned communities. It owns and develops retail town centers, logistics, business parks, office assets, residential communities, and retirement living villages.

== History ==
Stockland was founded in 1952 by Albert Scheinberg and Ervin Graf. In 1957, Stockland listed on the Australian Securities Exchange by acquiring a controlling interest in Simon Hickey Industries Ltd, the smallest company then listed.

In the same year, Stockland's activities became more diversified, moving into commercial development, initially with retail projects in suburbs of Sydney. In 1965 Stockland opened its first big commercial development - the redeveloped Imperial Arcade, Sydney in Sydney's CBD, which offered the first underground link to David Jones, four retail levels and six levels of office space.

Its current activities include:

- management of shopping centres, 41 centres valued at $5 billion across Australia.
- development of 65 residential communities with end-market value of approximately $21.2 billion.
- ownership and management of 16 offices in Australian capital cities
- 13 distribution and industrial centres
- 59 established retirement living villages.

In 2022, Stockland launched its ecommerce platform, Stockland Marketplace, expanding its retail operations to e-commerce.

== List of shopping centres ==
=== New South Wales ===
- Stockland Forster
- Stockland Green Hills
- Stockland Merrylands
- Stockland Piccadilly
- Stockland Shellharbour
- Stockland Wetherill Park

=== Queensland ===
- Stockland Baringa
- Stockland Birtinya
- Stockland Burleigh Heads
- Stockland Hervey Bay
- Stockland Rockhampton

=== Victoria ===
- Stockland Point Cook
- Stockland Wendouree

=== Western Australia ===
- Stockland Baldivis
- Stockland Harrisdale

== See also ==
- Shopping property management firms
