= Pumicestone Channel =

Strait in Queensland, Australia

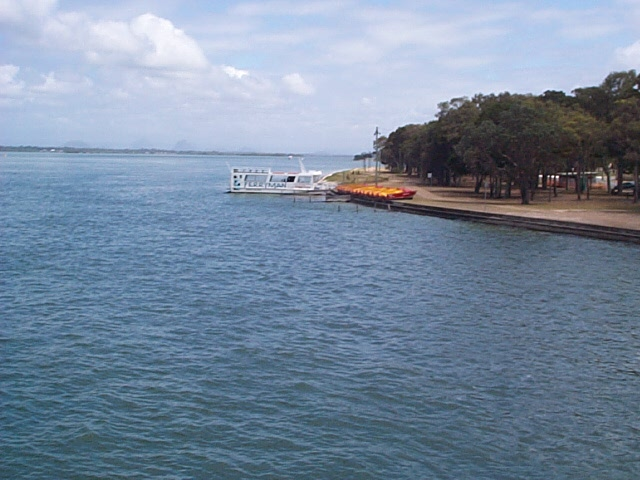
- High tide at Bellara, Pumicestone Channel

Details
- Location: Queensland, Australia
- Coordinates: 26.9394°S 153.0698°E
- Length: 35km
- North end: Caloundra
- South end: Deception Bay

Glasshouse Mountains from Bongaree

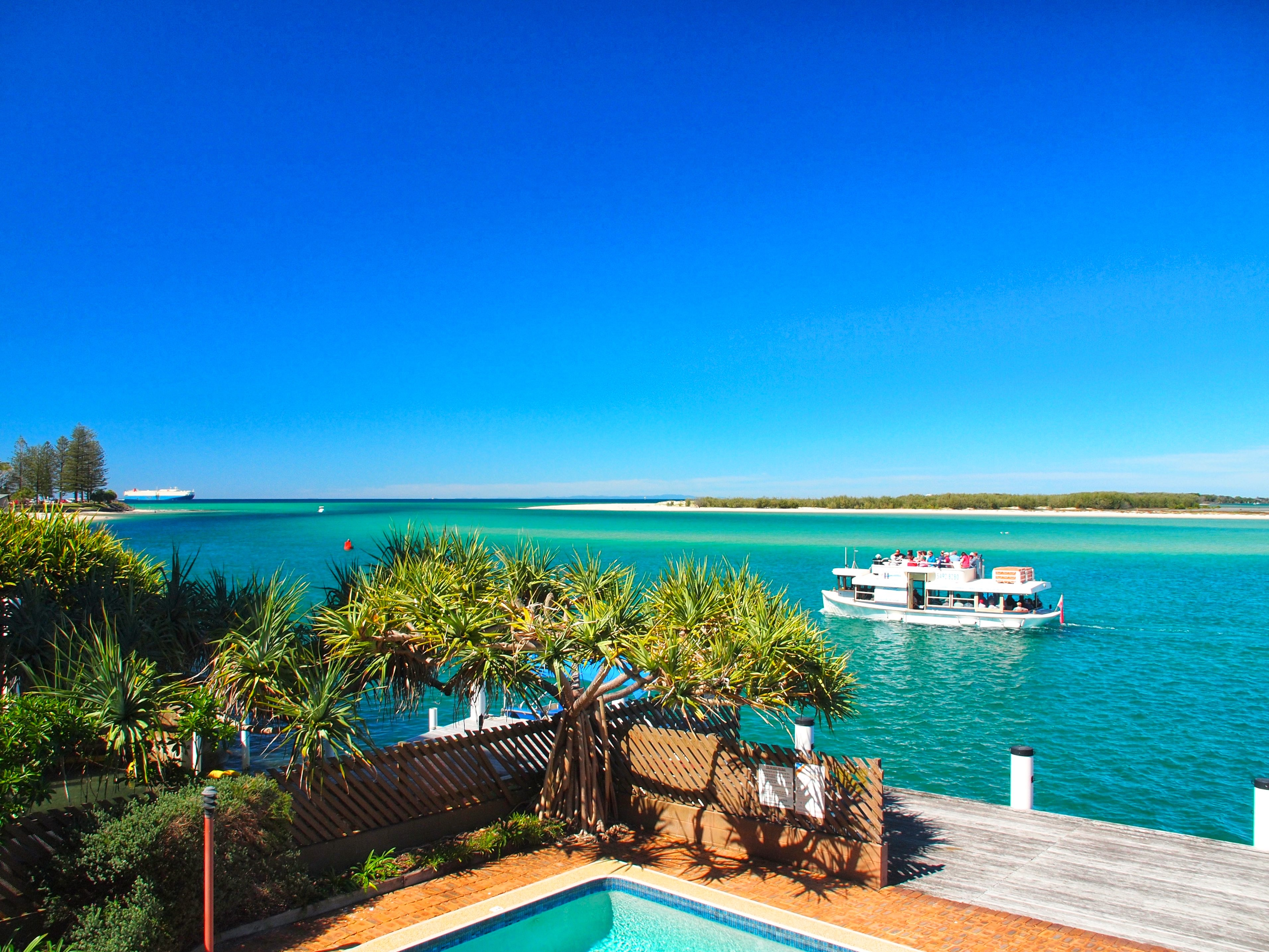
The passage at Caloundra

Pumicestone Channel, which is also known as the Pumicestone Passage, is a narrow, mesotidal waterway around 45 kilometres in length, between Bribie Island and the mainland in Queensland, Australia. The northern extent of the passage is at Caloundra, while at the south is Deception Bay. The waterway is a two-way tidal estuary that has 11 creeks flowing into it. At each end of the passage the channels are the deepest and widest.

During periods of unusually high tides and large waves, the passage is infiltrated by inflows through channels in dunes at the northern tip of Bribie Island.

== History ==
The channel was originally shown as Pumice-stone River on the maps of Matthew Flinders as he found an abundance of pumice stone lining the shoreline. He was the first European explorer to enter Moreton Bay in 1799 on the Sloop H. M. 'Norfolk' and spent two weeks exploring the bay and surrounds and naming Point Skirmish and Pumice-stone River.

In January 2022, large waves caused by ex-Tropical Cyclone Seth caused a breakthrough on Bribie Island, severing the island into two parts. The main channel for Pumicestone Passage moved south to the inflow. Since then the Caloundra Bar has become filled with sand. The changes have raised concerns with water quality at the northern end of the passage as a result of the reduced tidal exchange. Since 2023, the Queensland Department of Environment and Science has intensified its water quality monitoring in this area. Monitoring at the five northernmost sites in Pumicestone Passage has been increased to a monthly schedule, and an additional monitoring site has been set up within the new bar opening. The monitoring now includes the measurement of Enterococci bacteria levels as part of the regular monthly water quality checks.

== Environment ==
Gazetted in 1986, Pumicestone Passage Marine Park (now part of the Moreton Bay Marine Park), extends from the southern entrance at the towns of Bribie Island and Sandstone Point, north to the Caloundra bar. It is just over 35 kilometres long and has a surface area of 63 km². The town of Bribie Island comprises suburbs of Bongaree, Woorim, Bellara, Banksia Beach and White Patch. Bribie Island is reached by a Bridge of 800 meter length over the Pumicestone Passage. The marine park has 24 islands and is bounded by 240 kilometres of shoreline. Eighty percent of the channel is less than two metres deep and dugongs frequent its waters seasonally to feed on the seagrass on the bottom of the channel. Dolphins and turtles also make the channel home as do over 350 species of birds. Habitats within and adjoining the channel include mangroves and saltmarshes, sand flats and mud flats, coastal dunes and seagrass meadows. The channel forms part of the Moreton Bay and Pumicestone Passage Important Bird Area, so identified by BirdLife International because it supports large numbers of migratory waders, or shorebirds.

== See also ==
- Donnybrook
- Deception Bay
