= Caloundra Road =

Road in Queensland, Australia

Caloundra Road Queensland

General information
- Type: Road
- Length: 9.3 km (5.8 mi)
- Route number(s): (Meridan Plains – Nicklin Way); No shield (Nicklin Way – Bowman Road)

Major junctions
- West end: Bruce Highway, Meridan Plains
- Kawana Way Link Road; Bells Creek Arterial Road; Nicklin Way
- East end: Bowman Road, Caloundra

Location(s)
- Major suburbs: Little Mountain, Caloundra West

Caloundra Road is a continuous 9.3-kilometre (5.8 mi) road route in the Sunshine Coast local government area of Queensland, Australia. Most of it is designated as part of State Route 6. It is a state-controlled district road (number 132), part of which is rated as a local road of regional significance (LRRS).

== Route description ==
Caloundra Road commences as State Route 6 at an intersection with the Bruce Highway in Meridan Plains. It runs east through Meridan Plains until it reaches the exit to Racecourse Road. Racecourse Road crosses Caloundra Road by an overbridge and runs to the south, providing access to Corbould Park Racecourse. Caloundra Road then runs between Meridan Plains and the locality of Corbould Park, and then between Little Mountain and Corbould Park, where it reaches a roundabout intersection. This intersection provides access to Kawana Way Link Road to the north and Bells Creek Arterial Road to the south.

The road continues east and reaches the exit to Parklands Boulevard to the north-east and Pierce Avenue to the south-west. It then runs through Little Mountain, climbing the range until it reaches the exit to Sugar Bag Road to the north-east. Next it turns south-east and descends, passing through two more roundabouts as it transits Little Mountain and Caloundra West, and reaching another roundabout intersection as it enters Caloundra. This intersection provides access to Nicklin Way to the north-east and Pelican Waters Boulevard to the south.

Continuing south-east it reaches an intersection with West Terrace and Baldwin Street, where the road name changes to Bowman Road. It then turns east and passes the exit to Park Terrace, which leads to Landsborough Parade and then to the Esplanade, to the south. The road continues east until it reaches an intersection where Bowman Road turns north-east, where it ends. The physical road continues east as Bulcock Street.

Land use along the road is mainly rural in the west and industrial/retail in the east.

== Road condition ==
The road is fully sealed, and all of it is four-lane divided road. A distance of 1.5-kilometre (0.93 mi) is steeper than 5%. The highest elevation along the road is 71.6-metre (235 ft) and the lowest is 7.13-metre (23.4 ft).

=== Upgrade projects ===
A project to upgrade the intersection of Caloundra Road and Ridgewood Road, at a cost of $3.75 million, was completed in November 2021.

A project to plan the upgrade of the intersection of Caloundra Road, Kawana Way Link Road and Bells Creek Arterial Road, at a cost of $2 million, was expected to complete a business case in 2023.

=== Related Bruce Highway project ===
The intersection with the Bruce Highway at Meridan Plains was upgraded in 2021 as part of a project to expand the highway to six lanes at that point and to improve traffic flow through the intersection.

== History ==
Meridan Plains pastoral run was established circa 1870. In 2019 Corbould Park was excised from Meridan Plains to become a separate locality.

The first sale of alottments in Caloundra took place in 1883. The first school opened in 1899, and further land sales were conducted in 1907, 1917 and 1919.

The first lighthouse in Caloundra was constructed in 1896.

== Intersecting state-controlled roads ==
The following state-controlled roads intersect with Caloundra Road:

- Bells Creek Arterial Road
- Caloundra–Mooloolaba Road (Kawana Way Link Road)

=== Bells Creek Arterial Road ===
Bells Creek Arterial Road
- Location: Caloundra Road, Corbould Park to Bruce Highway, Coochin Creek, via Roys Road
- Length: 11.7 km (7.3 mi)
- Existed: 2023–present

Bells Creek Arterial Road is a state-controlled district road (number 139). It runs from Caloundra Road on the Corbould Park / Little Mountain midpoint to the Bruce Highway on the Coochin Creek / Beerwah midpoint, a distance of 11.7 kilometres (7.3 mi). It has no intersections with other state-controlled roads. It runs concurrent with Roys Road for the last 800 metres (870 yd).

Bells Creek Arterial Road was completed in 2023, with the southern section being officially opened on 19 September 2023.

=== Caloundra–Mooloolaba Road ===
Caloundra–Mooloolaba Road
- Location: Caloundra Road, Corbould Park to Kawana Way, Birtinya
- Length: 4.8 km (3.0 mi)

Caloundra–Mooloolaba Road (Kawana Way Link Road) is a state-controlled district road (number 151). It runs from Caloundra Road on the Corbould Park / Little Mountain midpoint to Kawana Way on the Meridan Plains / Birtinya midpoint, a distance of 4.8 kilometres (3.0 mi). It has no major intersections.

== Associated state-controlled road ==
Kawana Way intersects with Caloundra–Mooloolaba Road.

=== Kawana Way ===
Kawana Way
- Location: Caloundra–Mooloolaba Road, Birtinya to Sunshine Motorway, Mountain Creek
- Length: 8.5 km (5.3 mi)

Kawana Way is a state-controlled district road (number 152) rated as a local road of regional significance (LRRS). It runs from Caloundra–Mooloolaba Road on the Meridan Plains / Birtinya midpoint to the Sunshine Motorway on the Sippy Downs / Mountain Creek midpoint, a distance of 8.5 kilometres (5.3 mi). From its southern end the road continues as Creekside Boulevard and Errang Street through Currimundi to Nicklin Way. It has no intersections with other state-controlled roads.

== Major intersections ==
All distances are from Google Maps. The entire road is within the Sunshine Coast local government area.

Location	km	mi	Destinations	Notes
Meridan Plains	0	0.0	Bruce Highway – north – Nambour – south – Caboolture	Western end of Caloundra Road (State Route 6). This road is an extension of Glass House Mountains Road (Steve Irwin Way).
Meridan Plains / Corbould Park midpoint	2.5	1.6	Racecourse Road – south – Corbould Park Racecourse	Road continues east.
Corbould Park / Little Mountain midpoint	3.8	2.4	Kawana Way Link Road – north – Birtinya; Bells Creek Arterial Road – south – Baringa	Road continues east.
Little Mountain	6.3	3.9	Bellvista Boulevard – south–west – Caloundra West	Road continues south-east.
Caloundra West / Caloundra midpoint	8.3	5.2	Nicklin Way – north–east – Aroona, Battery Hill, Currimundi; Pelican Waters Boulevard – south – Golden Beach, Pelican Waters	Road continues south-east with no route number.
Caloundra	8.8	5.5	West Terrace – north – Caloundra; Baldwin Street – south – Golden Beach	Name changes to Bowman Road and continues south-east.
Caloundra	9.2	5.7	Park Place, to Landsborough Parade and then to the Esplanade – south – Golden Beach	Road continues east.
Caloundra	9.3	5.8	Bowman Road – north–east – Kings Beach, Moffat Beach	Eastern end of Caloundra Road. Road continues east as Bulcock Street.
1.000 mi = 1.609 km; 1.000 km = 0.621 mi: Route transition

== See also ==
- List of road routes in Queensland
- List of numbered roads in Queensland
