= Landsborough, Queensland =

Landsborough
- Town
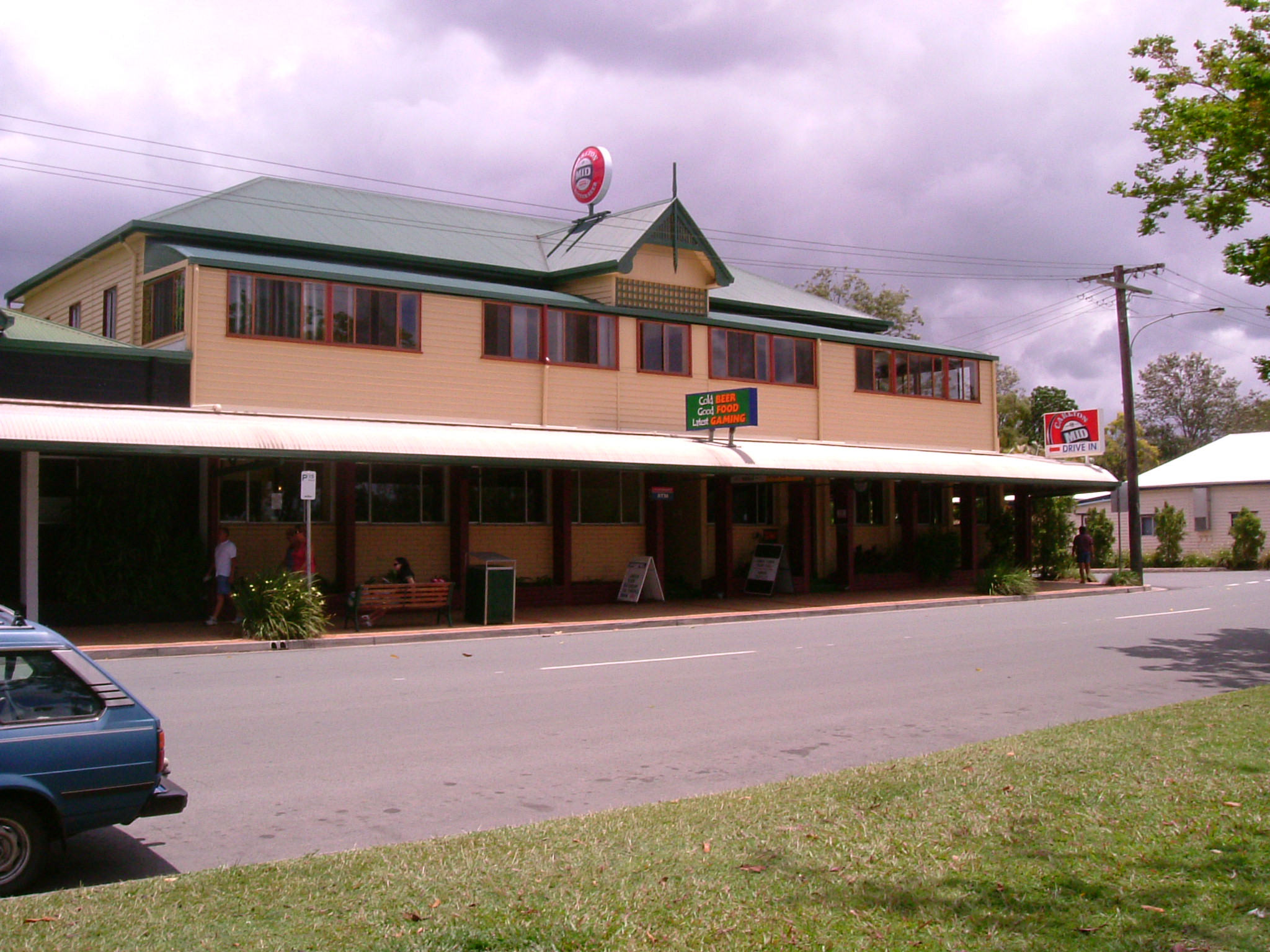
- Landsborough Pub, opposite the Landsborough railway station

- Interactive map of Landsborough
- Coordinates: 26.8091°S 152.9655°E
- Country: Australia
- State: Queensland
- LGA: Sunshine Coast Region
- Location: 20.3 km (12.6 mi) W of Caloundra; 29.9 km (18.6 mi) N of Caboolture; 75.3 km (46.8 mi) N of Brisbane CBD
- Established: 1871

Government
  - State electorate: Caloundra
  - Federal division: Fisher

Area
  - Total: 60.0 km^{2} (23.2 sq mi)

Population
  - Total: 4,446 (2021 census)
  - Density: 74.10/km^{2} (191.92/sq mi)
- Time zone: UTC+10:00 (AEST)
- Postcode: 4550
Localities around Landsborough
Mooloolah Valley	Glenview	Corbould Park
Bald Knob	Landsborough	Nirimba; Banya
Mount Mellum	Beerwah	Coochin Creek

Landsborough is a town and a locality in the Sunshine Coast Region, Queensland, Australia. In the 2021 census, the locality of Landsborough had a population of 4,446 people.

== Geography ==
Landsborough is in the Sunshine Coast hinterland. It is situated north of the Glasshouse Mountains just off Steve Irwin Way, 82 kilometres (51 mi) north of Brisbane at the base of the southern end of the Blackall Range.

The North Coast railway line enters the locality from the south (Beerwah), passes through the town in the west of the locality, and then exits the locality to the north-west (Mooloolah Valley). The town is served by Landsborough railway station (26.8082°S 152.9664°E).

The Bruce Highway passes along the eastern boundary of the locality. Steve Irwin Way passes through from south to north-east, and the Landsborough–Maleny Road exits to the north-west.

Landsborough has the following mountains, all in the east of the locality:

- Alfs Hill (26.8282°S 153.0196°E) 104 metres (341 ft)
- Deans Hill (26.8198°S 153.0032°E) 107 metres (351 ft)
- Maggies Hill (26.8095°S 153.0066°E) 142 metres (466 ft)

Ewen Maddock Dam is a reservoir in the north-east of the locality (26.7783°S 152.9955°E).

== History ==
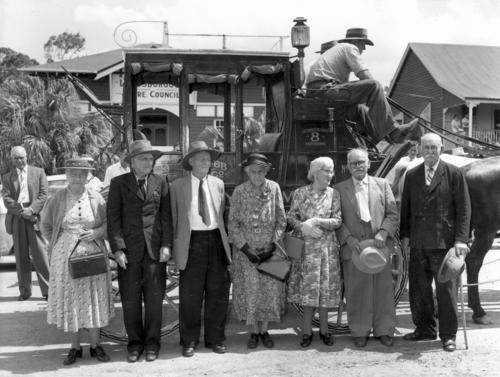
North Coast pioneers standing near Cobb & Co coach outside Landsborough Shire Chambers, which was then located on Landsborough Maleny Road

Landsborough was named for the British-born explorer William Landsborough, who was the first European to cross Australia north to south. The earliest European settlers arrived in the area in 1871. Originally called Mellum Creek ("mellum" is an Aboriginal word for "volcano"), it dates from 1871 when Isaac Burgess erected a slab hut with bark roof as "port of call" for Cobb and Co coaches stopping for refreshments and a change of horses.

Mellum Creek Provisional School opened on 29 September 1879 and closed in 1882. It reopened in 1884 and, in 1891, was renamed Landsborough Provisional School. On 1 January 1909, it became Landsborough State School.

Mellum Creek Post Office opened on 23 January 1881. It was renamed Landsborough in 1890.

In the past Landsborough was one of the larger towns of the Sunshine Coast having a large logging industry.

In 1912, the town became the administrative centre for the Landsborough Shire after separating from the Caboolture Shire. Advertisements for the September 1927 auction of land in the Landsborough Township Estate emphasized the prosperity and fast-growing nature of the town. Landsborough Shire merged into the City of Caloundra in 1968.

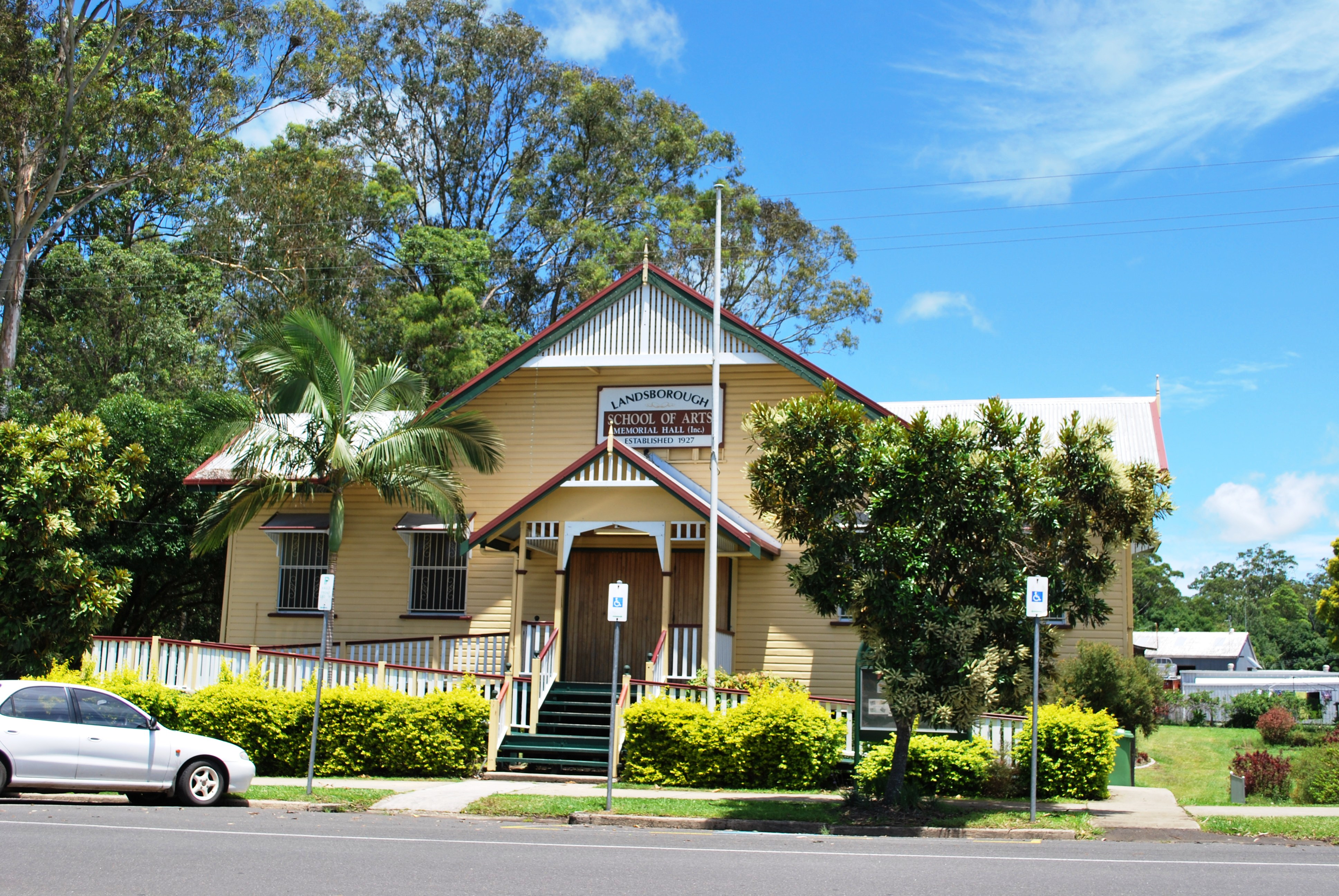
Landsborough School of Arts Memorial Hall, 2008

The Landsborough School of Arts Memorial Hall was celebrated with a stump capping ceremony on 24 November 1923 involving Member of the Queensland Legislative Assembly for Murrumba, Richard Warren. The hall was officially opened on 4 May 1924 by Queensland Governor, Matthew Nathan.

St John's Anglican Church was dedicated on 13 October 1956 by Archbishop Reginald Halse. It closed circa 1987. The building was sold for removal.

Glasshouse Country Uniting Church opened its church at Beerwah on 16 December 2000. It was a result of the merger of the Glasshouse Uniting Church, Beerwah Uniting Church, Landsborough Uniting Church and Mooloolah Uniting Church.

== Demographics ==
In the 2011 census, the town of Landsborough had a population of 3,706 people.

In the 2016 census, the locality of Landsborough had a population of 3,812 people.

In the 2021 census, the locality of Landsborough had a population of 4,446 people.

== Heritage listings ==
Landsborough has a number of heritage-listed sites, including:

- Landsborough Air Raid Shelter, Cribb Street
- former Landsborough Shire Council Chambers, 4-6 Maleny Street
- North Coast Roadside Rest Area, Steve Irwin Way in Glenview

== Education ==
Landsborough State School is a government primary (Prep-6) school for boys and girls at 41 Gympie Street North (26.8040°S 152.9645°E). In 2018, the school had an enrolment of 353 students with 27 teachers (23 full-time equivalent) and 20 non-teaching staff (13 full-time equivalent). It includes a special education program.

There are no secondary schools in Landsborough. The nearest government secondary school is Beerwah State High School in neighbouring Beerwah to the south.

== Attractions ==
Landsborough is a popular tourism stop off due to the fact it is the first stop and is often regarded as the Gateway to the hinterland Tourist Trail. Landsborough features parks and playgrounds, such as Pioneer Park. Landsborough's economy mostly derives from small businesses, with many cafés and small eateries.

The Landsborough Shire Museum is located in the former Landsborough Shire Council Chambers at 4-6 Maleny Street (26.8093°S 152.9647°E). It contains a large number of historical artefacts from the local area, including from the pre-colonial and the early pioneer years of the former Landsborough Shire and the former Caloundra City region. Of note are the artefacts belonging to explorer William Landsborough.

== Transport ==
The Landsborough railway station is on the North Coast railway line, providing access to Brisbane, Nambour and Gympie via train and is the major bus transport hub for the coastal regions of the Sunshine Coast. This is also the closest railway station to the Sunshine Coast University Hospital.

== See also ==
- Blackall Range road network
