= Meridan State College =

Location
- Meridan Plains, Caloundra, Queensland; Australia; 26.7728°S 153.1028°E

Information
- Type: public
- Motto: Learning today, creating tomorrow
- Established: 2006
- Principal: Tony Roberts
- Enrolment: 2532 (2021)
- Colours: Purple, cyan, lavender
- Website: meridansc.eq.edu.au

Meridan State College is a state school governed by the Queensland Department of Education located at 214 Parklands Boulevard, Meridan Plains, Caloundra, Queensland, Australia. The school was founded in 2006 for students from Prep to year 6, and in 2008 it opened to be available to year 8, year 10 in 2010, and year 12 in 2012. It is one of the largest schools on the Sunshine Coast, Queensland

== School awards ==
In November 2015, Meridan State College received the Jack Pizzey School of the Year Award. This award no longer exists.

== Sporting communities ==
Meridan State College has four sporting houses (referred to as "communities") within the school. These communities are named after Australian athletes.

Community	Mascot	Colour	Namesake
Bradman	Bulls	Green	Donald Bradman
Freeman	Flames	Yellow	Cathy Freeman
O'Neill	Eels	Purple	Suzie O'Neill
Rafter	Redbacks	Red	Pat Rafter
