= Baringa, Queensland =

Baringa
- Suburb
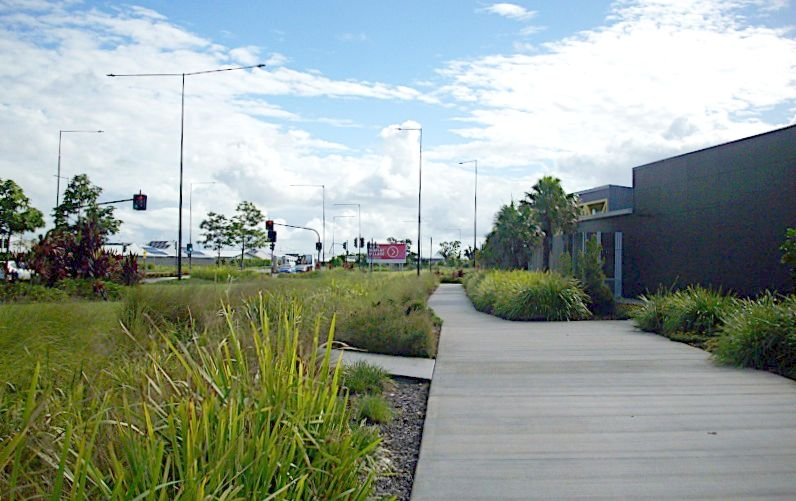
- Aura Boulevard, Baringa

- Interactive map of Baringa
- Coordinates: 26.8097°S 153.0780°E
- Country: Australia
- State: Queensland
- LGA: Sunshine Coast Region
- Location: 7.2 km (4.5 mi) W of Caloundra CBD; 24 km (15 mi) S of Maroochydore; 28.1 km (17.5 mi) SSE of Nambour; 89.6 km (55.7 mi) N of Brisbane
- Established: 2017

Government
  - State electorate: Caloundra
  - Federal division: Fisher

Area
  - Total: 4.1 km^{2} (1.6 sq mi)

Population
  - Total: 4,604 (2021 census)
  - Density: 1,123/km^{2} (2,910/sq mi)
- Time zone: UTC+10:00 (AEST)
- Postcode: 4551
Suburbs around Baringa
Corbould Park	Little Mountain	Caloundra West
Corbould Park	Baringa	Caloundra West
Nirimba	Bells Creek	Caloundra West

Baringa is a new suburb in the Sunshine Coast Region, Queensland, Australia. It was established in 2017. In the 2021 census, Baringa had a population of 4,604 people.

== Geography ==
Aura Boulevard enters the locality from the south-west (Nirimba / Bells Creek) and Bells Creek Arterial Road enters from the south (Bells Creek). The two roads intersect at a roundabout in Baringa with Bells Creek Arterial Road continuing to the north and exiting to Corbould Park to the north-west, while Aura Boulevard continues to the east and exits to the east (Caloundra West).

== History ==
Baringa is situated in the Gubbi Gubbi (Kabi) traditional Aboriginal country. The name Baringa comes from the Gubbi-Gubbi language and means summit or little mountain.

The locality of Baringa was excised from Bells Creek on 18 August 2017. It was created to accommodate residential population growth in the Caloundra South Priority Development Area. The first residential land sales commenced in August 2016 with the expectation of homes being occupied from 2017. Baringa is part of a $5 billion master-planned community being developed by Stockland and is expected to accommodate 50,000 people after 30 years.

Baringa State Primary School opened in 2018 on the highest point in the residential area. The school had an initial capacity of 470 students with plans to accommodate 1,100 students within its first 5 to 8 years. The founding principal was Noel Baggs. The school was designed to have an emphasis on science, technology, engineering, and mathematics (STEM).

The Baringa Community Centre, a central meeting hub which was created in partnership with the Queensland Government, Sunshine Coast Council, and Stockland, opened in 2019 and 'provides a dedicated space for local people to gather and connect with each other', according to the Sunshine Coast Council.

Construction of Baringa State Secondary College commenced in March 2020. The school opened at the start of 2021 for its first student intake of Years 7 and 8 students. 2025 was the first year in which the college provided the full range of secondary school from Years 7 to 12.

== Amenities ==
Baringa offers a variety of amenities including a shopping center which includes stores like IGA, and a park named Baringa Forest Park modeled off the local blackbutt forest.

== Demographics ==
In the 2021 census, Baringa had a population of 4,604 people. This was the first census for Baringa.

== Education ==
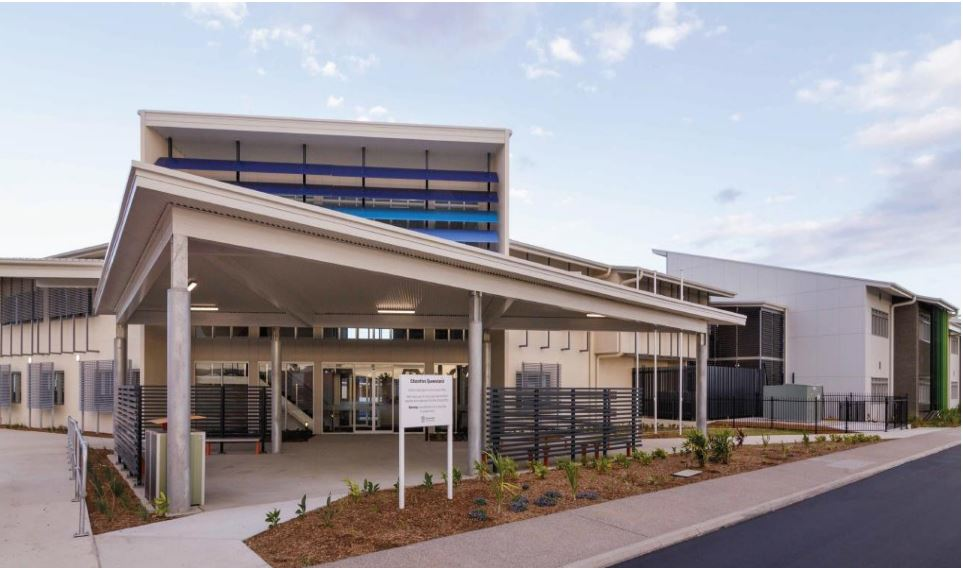
Baringa State Primary School, 2018

Baringa State Primary School is a government primary (Prep–6) school at 30 Baringa Drive (26.8081°S 153.0825°E). In 2024, the school had an enrolment of 982 students with 72 teachers (64 full-time equivalent) and 38 non-teaching staff (29 full-time equivalent).

Baringa State Secondary College is a government secondary (7–12) school at 10 Griffith Place (26.8051°S 153.0770°E).
