= Tripcony Hibiscus Caravan Park =

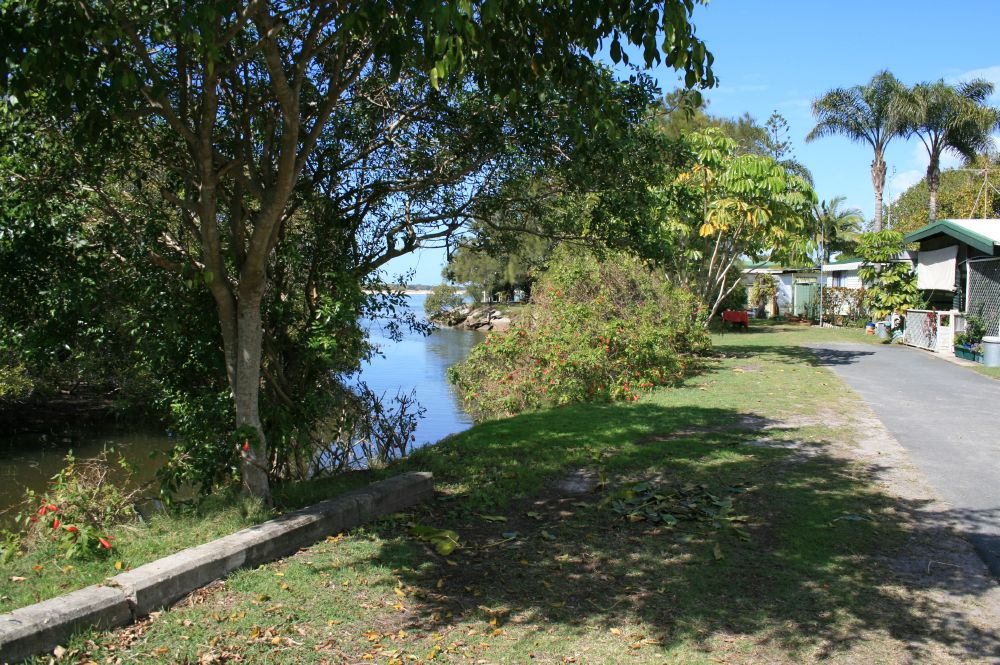
- Tripcony Hibiscus Caravan Park, 2007

- Location within Queensland Location within Australia
- 26.8055°S 153.1248°E
- Location: Bowman Road, Caloundra CBD, Sunshine Coast Region, Queensland, Australia

History
- Design period: 1900–1914 (early 20th century)
- Built: 1912–

Queensland Heritage Register
- Official name: Tripcony Hibiscus Caravan Park
- Type: state heritage (built)
- Designated: 3 April 2009
- Reference no.: 602708
- Significant period: 1912–
- Significant components: other – recreation/entertainment: component

Tripcony Hibiscus Caravan Park is a heritage-listed caravan park at Bowman Road, Caloundra CBD, Sunshine Coast Region, Queensland, Australia. It was built from 1912 onwards. It was added to the Queensland Heritage Register on 3 April 2009.

== History ==
Tripcony Hibiscus Caravan Park is located between Bowman Road and Pumicestone Passage on a site long recognised as the entrance to Caloundra. The caravan park has two sections separated by Pumicestone Creek. Tripcony is located on the coast guard (eastern) side of Pumicestone Creek while Hibiscus is situated on the Leach's Park (western) side of the Creek. The whole of this land (20 acres) was reserved for wharf purposes by 1877, demonstrating the importance of transportation to the early township. It was later re-designated as a camping reserve in 1912 as the settlement's popularity as a seaside resort increased. As motorised transport became dominant and leisure time increased, particularly post-World War II, this site was converted into a caravan park to meet the needs of the growing number of caravanning holiday-makers whose destination was the North Coast (later Sunshine Coast). Its still-water seaside location close to a major road with easy access for cars, and its range of accommodation and amenities, which have evolved over time, demonstrate all the features of a typical caravan park.

The North Coast region including Caloundra began to develop as a holiday destination at the end of the 19th century. Caloundra and other sites in south-east Queensland such as Tewantin, the Redcliffe Peninsula and Southport developed as resorts. This reflected the preferences of the Victorian era for a calm shallow stretch of river or still-water seaside location which allowed safe bathing, boating and fishing. Camping along rivers and on reserves occurred especially over the Christmas-New Year period. These resort settlements became more popular as accessibility was improved.

The history of the Tripcony Hibisicus Caravan Park site is linked to the development of transport to this region. Originally 20 acres of land, it was set aside as a wharf reserve by 1877. Shortly afterwards in 1879, the Pumicestone Passage was surveyed and beaconed by the crew of the Shadow for Thomas Tripcony, oystergetter, of Cowie Bank. Initially all stores were brought from Brisbane and passengers for Caloundra arrived via Bribie Island making this site (known as Black Flat or Tripcony Flat) an important entry-point for Caloundra. Passengers from Brisbane arrived at Bongaree Jetty on Bribie Island on the steamer Koopa. From there the Tripcony boat brought visitors to Caloundra. The first store in Caloundra, located at Black Flat near the wharf reserve, was started by family member, Andrew Tripcony in about 1912.

In 1912 the Wharf Reserve was gazetted as a Camping Reserve and functioned as this for the next four and a half decades. It was referred to by various names including Black Flat Camping Reserve, Tripcony Camping Reserve and South End Reserve. The Landsborough Shire Council erected a windmill and tank to provide a water supply for campers.

Initially North Coast tourists arrived by train at stations between Landsborough and Cooroy before using local forms of motorised transport to reach coastal destinations from railway stations between Landsborough to Cooroy but the interwar period saw substantial improvements to the region's road transport network. From the early 1920s, road works by local councils and the Main Roads Commission improved connections between inland and coastal settlements. Subdivision and sale of the Bulcock Estate to the north of the Camping Reserve c. 1917 brought settlers and holiday-makers to Caloundra. Guesthouses opened and by the 1920s, several boat hire businesses were operating, and the township had a general store, butcher and baker.

Continued improved road access from Brisbane and inland towns during the 1930s increased the popularity of the North Coast as a resort. Development accelerated after the new road to Caloundra was built in 1935 and most of the Bruce Highway to Nambour was bituminised during the 1930s. With improved access for visitors from Brisbane, it was not unusual to see 600 or 700 cars parked on Caloundra's foreshores. Building activity reflected this popularity and included: a new subdivision of housing allotments at Moffat Head; the Amusu picture theatre (1935) in Bulcock Street; the Kings Beach Bathing Pavilion with kiosk and changing sheds (1937); the Queensland Governor's Curramundi House at Dicky Beach (1936); and the Semloh, cafe, store and guesthouse (c. 1937). Land was resumed from the Bulcock Beach Esplanade in 1935 for recreational purposes and a camping ground was established in the water reserve.

In the immediate post-war period the Landsborough Shire Council intended to improve the Black Flat Camping Reserve. It proposed in its post-war plan to level, drain and grass the camping reserve and in 1947 the Shire Council applied for a £1000 loan for improvements to the camping areas at Black Flat and Kings Beach. During the summer of 1949–50 it was observed that Black Flat (South End) Reserve could be improved. It was capable of accommodating more campers if campsites were better organised. Traffic on a dirt road on the eastern side churned up dust that went throughout the camp area. Improvements were made to the camping area in subsequent years. Trees were planted in 1952 and an additional water supply to Black Flat reserve was requested in March 1953.

The popularity of the site was evident in the early 1950s. The Assembly of God ran a "Camp and Campaign" in 1953 at Black Flat. In the following year the Nambour Chronicle noted that Black Flat was popular among caravan owners who were enthusiastic black fish anglers.

With the considerable growth of car ownership during the interwar period caravans began appearing on Queensland roads. Caravans offered freedom for the affluent motor tourist, without sacrificing comfort. As a "home away from home", fitted with modern conveniences, caravans were markedly different from the simplicity of camping under a canvas tent. Caravans were an alternative to local hotels and guesthouses, the latter being in high demand during peak seasons, and providing varying levels of quality.

Post-World War II the popularity of caravans became more noticeable as the tourist industry resumed its pre-war expansion predicated on improved roads. The growth of motor tourism during the 1950s was stimulated by the lifting of petrol rationing by the Menzies government, the increased affordability of cars for the wider population and longer paid holidays. In 1946, The Road Ahead was noting the numbers of motor tourists from Victoria and New South Wales holidaying in Queensland. There was estimated to be 12,000 caravans on Australia roads by 1948–1949. The Caravan Club of Australia was formed in 1948 and a Brisbane branch had been established by 1951, offering advice to visitors.

The popularity of caravanning in Queensland was fostered by the RACQ which pushed for changes to restrictive road laws and improved caravanning facilities. The 1950 Queensland Traffic Act limited cars towing caravans to 25 miles per hour (40 km/h), compared to 50 miles per hour (80 km/h) for cars. By 1960 this speed had been lifted to 40. From 1949 when increasing numbers of caravans were appearing on North Coast roads the RACQ was urging local authorities on tourist routes to provide 'well equipped camps "to prepare for the boom". In 1954, RACQ Secretary Len King drew attention to the poor state of Queensland's caravan parks, noting that the average caravanner spent £5 in the local area in which they stayed.

The increasing number of caravan users in turn stimulated development of caravan parks. Private developers were the first to offer caravan parks from the late 1930s with modern facilities and structured layout. However, in the early 1950s, relatively few sites in Queensland offered the necessary infrastructure to accommodate caravanning needs. Calls for improvements to sites and facilities accompanied increased caravan usage. Advocates looked to the United States and the United Kingdom for examples of best practice in caravan parks. Caravanning guides and journals offered suggestions for layout and features. The publication Modern Caravan Parks offered advice to local authorities and others interested in establishing caravan parks. Suggestions included a more formal arrangement of space than camping required, characterised by grid or circular layouts and landscaped grounds. Features of caravan parks became a location near a main road, a prominent entrance, recreation room, brick amenities block, levelled concrete slabs, landscaping, hose connections, hot showers and electricity. They also had on-site caretakers/proprietors. Many parks offered on-site vans for rental. "Tradespeople" called to deliver essentials like bread and milk. A common characteristic of public (and private) camping grounds and caravan parks has been the continual updating of their facilities.

Requests for development of the Black Flat site as a caravan park started as early as 1950. In October that year a formal application from E.G. Sinclair of Sydney to the Landsborough Shire Council to develop Black Flat Camping Reserve as a modern caravan park and holiday area was considered, but did not proceed. In 1955 the Caloundra Development Association suggested that Black Flat camping area be developed by private enterprise as a camping and caravan park thus saving expense to ratepayers. The Landsborough Shire Council advised that the area was reserved and could not be leased. In 1957, G.F.R. Nicklin, MLA and Leader of the Opposition, presented the Lands Department with a request to develop a caravan park at the entrance to Caloundra, on behalf of Caloundra public bodies. The request was granted and this reserve became Hibiscus Caravan Park.

By 1960, a mix of public and private parks had been established on the North (Sunshine) Coast. Development of these caravan parks expanded during the 1960s. An inspection by RACQ club officials in 1962 of the state's caravan and camping grounds noted the progress through local government efforts, especially advancements by privately owned parks. Many council camping grounds became known as "caravan parks" as site facilities became more geared to their use. Names of parks could evoke the exotic history of caravanning, while others, like Hibiscus, highlighted natural features.

By the 1970s, caravanning was a well established and common leisure practice. A self-contained holiday in a caravan became an annual ritual for many campers, often returning to the same park year after year, members of a holiday community linked by shared experiences of place. After private houses, caravans were the most popular form of holiday accommodation in Australia in 1976. They were significant contributors to local economies in tourist regions, through accommodation fees and flow on effects to other local businesses.

Over time, the affordability of caravan park accommodation has attracted more long term residents. This has included retirees, people experiencing economic hardship and seasonal or temporary workers. In accordance with this trend, the Tripcony Hibiscus Caravan Park moved into this sphere of accommodation and currently has about 80 permanent residents on the Hibiscus side of the caravan park.

During the last 25 years development on the North Coast has been especially rapid with the population of the Sunshine Coast growing at around twice the rate of the State as a whole. The Sunshine Coast is now Queensland's third largest tourist destination in terms of holiday accommodation after the Gold Coast and Cairns. This has meant that although there is still strong demand for caravan park accommodation, there is also increased pressure for these strategically and attractively located, undeveloped sites to be utilised for other accommodation types or returned to parkland. In 1979 the Reserve for Camping (106) was divided into two portions with the establishment of portion 566 (Hibiscus) and Leach Park, while portion 764 became the remainder (Tripcony).

The closure of caravan parks in coastal areas began in the 1970s as more intensive commercial and residential development occurred in the region. On the coastal strip between Noosa and Caloundra in 1968, there were 24 sites operating as caravan parks and five out of the six council camping reserves offered facilities for caravans, including power. In 2007, there are 16 caravan parks remaining on the coastal strip and no council camping reserves.

In the late 1980s the Hibiscus Caravan Park lease was obtained from the Caloundra City Council by a private developer. The Caloundra City Council requested that the Queensland Government cancel the Reserve for Camping for the land on which the Tripcony Caravan Park was located as it did not require, and would not in the future, require the land for public purposes. This was approved by Cabinet and a lease for the land issued to the land developer who already held the Hibiscus Caravan Park lease. Later the development company became insolvent and the company's creditor, the Bank of South Australia, sold the lease to SEQ Properties. This company requested a lease to continue operating the caravan park. Subsequently the Department of Natural Resources and Water issued a lease to SEQ Properties for 15 years from 1993. Since then the company has upgraded and operated it a tourist caravan park comprising 190 sites with a selection of waterfront ensuite units, cabins, backpackers units, powered sites and tent sites. Today the Tripcony Hibiscus Caravan Park is one of only four remaining caravan parks in Caloundra.

In 2009, future land use of caravan park sites, particularly on Crown land, remains a contentious topic. Local communities and visitors have come to attach special significance to caravan parks as places of leisure, which has been demonstrated by their efforts to protect council-operated caravan parks on Crown land along the Queensland coast. The current lessee of the Tripcony Hibiscus Caravan Park site, SEQ Properties, has been offered a new 30-year lease of the site for caravan park purposes. This followed an exhaustive investigation into options for the future use of the site culminating in the announcement by the Premier of Queensland, Anna Bligh, that the continuing use of the site as a caravan park demonstrated her Government's commitment to retaining caravan parks on State-owned land for low-cost tourism.

== Description ==
Screened from the road by rows and clumps of leafy trees and shrubs, the Tripcony Hibiscus Caravan Park stands on the busy four-laned Bowman Road opposite the large Stockland shopping complex at the south end of Caloundra. Nestled into the cove at the north end of the Pumicestone Channel, the caravan park has expansive views across to Bribie Island, views southeast to Bulcock Beach and southwest to Golden Beach. The caravan park terminates a strip of high-rise apartments to the east and is separated by a drain from Leach Park to the south.

Pumicestone Creek runs through the property dividing it into two sections: Tripcony to the east and Hibiscus to the west.

The main entrance is from Bowman Road where there is a skillion roof, two-storey, concrete block and fibro office and a number of temporary car parking bays. A boom gate south of the Bowman Road entrance marks the entry to the Hibiscus side of the caravan park and the Tripcony side is entered from the east off Tripcony Lane.

Both parts of the caravan park are organised around a grid of bituminised roadways. Both grids have the main roadways running north/south. Hibiscus has a circular section off grid to the southeast and the east/west roadways on the Tripcony side are slightly off the perpendicular.

The park offers a mix of temporary and permanent accommodation sites. The temporary sites include on-site vans and single-storey cabins, concrete slabs to take vans brought on site and grassed areas for tent camping. The permanent sites accommodate a variety of structures including vans, cabins and sheds with a range of extensions and personalising elements like gardens, low fences, outdoor areas and decorative features.

Both sides of the park have a large masonry ablutions block.

A grassed strip runs around the south and southeast end of the Hibiscus side and accommodates seats, a barbeque area and a concrete slipway boat ramp. Pine and pandanas trees are prominent along the waterfront and a range of vegetation including palms and cotton trees is scattered across the park.

== Heritage listing ==
Tripcony Hibiscus Caravan Park was listed on the Queensland Heritage Register on 3 April 2009 having satisfied the following criteria.

The place is important in demonstrating the evolution or pattern of Queensland's history.

Tripcony Hibiscus Caravan Park is important in demonstrating the pattern of development of the Sunshine Coast, an important region for the development of seaside tourism in Queensland. Originally gazetted as a Wharf and Water reserve in 1877 and re-gazetted for Camping and Recreation purposes in 1912, Tripcony Hibiscus Caravan Park has sustained its use as a seaside camping ground. It illustrates the policy of colonial Queensland governments of reserving Crown land for public purposes, a practice which was common but is now rare.

Tripcony Hibiscus Caravan Park is important in demonstrating the evolution of tourist accommodation on the Sunshine Coast, an historically important region for the development of caravan parks in Queensland. It does this through it beginnings as a seaside camping ground dating from 1912 to its reconfiguration as a caravan park in 1957 at the vanguard of the boom period for caravanning (late 1950s and 1960s), and later through periodic updating of its facilities in response to contemporary demands. This development was intrinsically linked to the phenomenon of caravanning that resulted from the rise of mass motoring Australia-wide in the second half of the 20th century.

The place is important in demonstrating the principal characteristics of a particular class of cultural places.

Tripcony Hibiscus Caravan Park represents a land use and custom that has made a strong contribution to the pattern and evolution of Queensland's tourism history. It is an excellent example of a camping and caravanning site that has been used by Queensland holiday-makers since 1912. Located adjacent to an area of quiet water allowing easy access for swimming, boating and fishing activities, Tripcony Hibiscus Caravan Park is important in illustrating the essential characteristics of early camping reserves.

Tripcony Hibiscus Caravan Park demonstrates the principal characteristics of a waterside caravan park. On a prime waterfront location with immediate access to still water, the place offers opportunities to interact with, and appreciate the natural beauty of its setting. Easily accessed by motor vehicles, and organised around a simple grid of streets and landscaping, the Park offers a range of accommodation types, which are served by a range of facilities that include ablutions blocks, barbeques and picnic areas. The range of accommodation and amenities has evolved over time to meet the changing needs of its clientele, while remaining low-scale and relatively affordable for holidaymakers.
