= Kathleen McArthur =

Australian artist and conservationist (1915–2000)

- Born: 1915; Brisbane, Australia
- Died: 2000 (aged 84–85); Caloundra, Australia
- Known for: Author, botanical illustrator, naturalist

Kathleen McArthur (1915 – 2000) was an Australian naturalist, writer, botanical illustrator and conservationist. She was born in Brisbane, Queensland, to Catherine and Daniel Evans. Her mother was a daughter of the Durack pastoral family, her father a co-founder of the engineering firm Evans Deakin and Company. She married Malcolm McArthur in 1938 and had three children before divorcing in 1947. From 1942, she lived at Caloundra on the Sunshine Coast, Queensland.

== Environmental activist ==
McArthur was a strong environmentalist and a co-founder, with Judith Wright, David Fleay and Brian Clouston, of the Wildlife Preservation Society of Queensland in 1962, and served as vice-president from then until 1965. In 1963, she founded the Caloundra branch of the society.

She was involved in several campaigns during the 1960s and 1970s to preserve landscapes threatened by economic development, including the Pumicestone Passage, the Great Barrier Reef and the Cooloola section of the Great Sandy National Park. Much campaign work was funded through her growing and selling native plants as well as through exhibitions of her wildflower paintings. She was especially concerned for the Wallum country of South East Queensland, a habitat characterised by floristically rich coastal heath and swamps on deep sandy soils.

The spider, Ozicrypta mcarthurae, was named after her for her outstanding contribution to conservation. In 1996, she was awarded an honorary doctorate by James Cook University of North Queensland.

Currimundi Lake (Kathleen McArthur) Conservation Park in Currimundi, Queensland is named after her.

== Writing ==
McArthur wrote a weekly column, "Wildlife and Landscape", for her local paper. She also started the Lunch Hour Theatre in Caloundra, a monthly event for which she wrote scripts based on environmental, biographical and historical subjects. Books authored (and illustrated) by McArthur include:

- 1959 – Queensland Wildflowers – A Selection. Jacaranda Press: Brisbane.
- 1978 – Pumicestone Passage: A Living Waterway. Bacchus Printing: Brisbane.
- 1981 – Bread and Dripping Days: An Australian Growing Up in the 20s. Kangaroo Press: Kenthurst.
- 1982 – The Bush in Bloom: A Wildflower Artist’s Year in Paintings and Words. Kangaroo Press: Kenthurst.
- 1985 – The Little Fishes of Pumicestone Passage. Artworks: Brisbane.
- 1986 – Looking at Australian Wildflowers. Kangaroo Press: Kenthurst.
- 1989 – Living on the Coast. Kangaroo Press: Kenthurst.

== See also ==
- List of Australian botanical illustrators
