= Ozicrypta mcarthurae =

Scientific classification
- Kingdom: Animalia
- Phylum: Arthropoda
- Subphylum: Chelicerata
- Class: Arachnida
- Order: Araneae
- Infraorder: Mygalomorphae
- Family: Barychelidae
- Genus: Ozicrypta
- Species: O. mcarthurae

Binomial name
- Ozicrypta mcarthurae Raven & Churchill, 1994

Species of spider

Ozicrypta mcarthurae is a species of mygalomorph spider in the Barychelidae family. It is endemic to Australia. It was described in 1994 by Australian arachnologists Robert Raven and Tracey Churchill. The specific epithet mcarthurae honours naturalist, author and wildflower painter Kathleen McArthur, cofounder of the Wildlife Preservation Society of Queensland.

== Distribution and habitat ==
The species occurs in the Fraser Coast Region of south-east Queensland in rainforest habitats. The type locality is Mount Bauple.
