= Currimundi Lake (Kathleen McArthur) Conservation Park =

Park near Currimundi, Caloundra, Queensland, Australia

- Location within Queensland
- Interactive map of Currimundi Lake (Kathleen McArthur) Conservation Park
- Location: Queensland
- Nearest city: Currimundi
- Coordinates: 26°45′41″S 153°7′56″E
- Established: 1994

Currimundi Lake (Kathleen McArthur) Conservation Park is a protected area in Wurtulla, north of Currimundi, approximately 4 km (2.5 mi) north of Caloundra, Queensland, Australia.

The park is named after Kathleen McArthur, a local artist, conservationist and founding member of the Wildlife Preservation Society of Queensland in 1962.

The park's total area is 50 hectares (124 acres). It was first declared as a conservation park in 1994. A large percentage of the park is wallum heath, which in turn then supports a large and diverse number of fauna; 353 species, 14 of which are introduced, 25 species are rare or threatened. A vast array of wildflowers may be seen in the park at any time of the year, but are most abundant in late winter to early spring. A local volunteer group currently visits the park every month to engage in activities such as removing of weeds and revegetating. The park has two well-mapped walking tracks with information signs. Picnic facilities are provided in the Crummunda Park; facilities include picnic tables, barbecues and toilets.

The altitude of the terrain is 2 meters.
