= Kings Beach Bathing Pavilion =

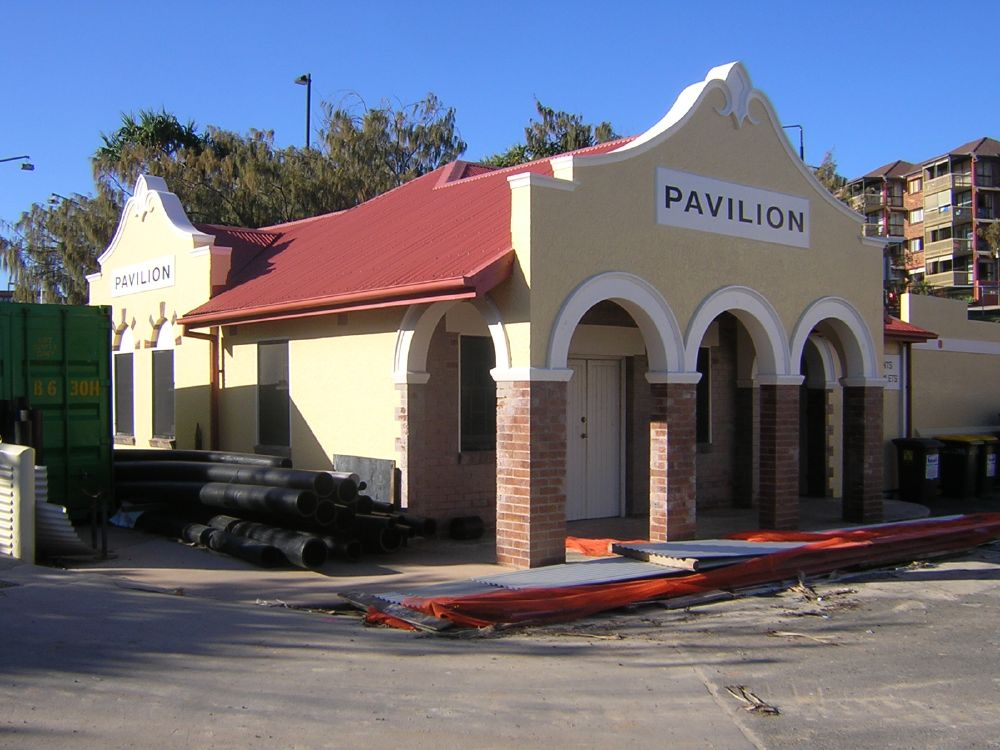
- Kings Beach Bathing Pavilion, 2006

- Location within Queensland Location within Australia
- 26.8027°S 153.1431°E
- Location: Ormonde Terrace, Kings Beach, Sunshine Coast Region, Queensland, Australia

History
- Design period: 1919–1930s (interwar period)
- Built: 1937

Site notes
- Architect: Clifford Ernest Plant
- Architectural style: Spanish Mission

Queensland Heritage Register
- Official name: Kings Beach Bathing Pavilion
- Type: state heritage (built)
- Designated: 23 April 1999
- Reference no.: 601513
- Significant period: 1937 (fabric); 1937–1992 (historical)
- Builders: Ralph Alexander Lind

Kings Beach Bathing Pavilion is a heritage-listed changing rooms at Ormonde Terrace, Kings Beach, Sunshine Coast Region, Queensland, Australia. It was designed by Clifford Ernest Plant and built in 1937 by Ralph Alexander Lind. It was added to the Queensland Heritage Register on 23 April 1999.

== History ==
This one storey masonry building was constructed in 1937 by the Landsborough Shire Council to provide public bathing and kiosk facilities for those using Kings Beach. The architect of the pavilion was Clifford Ernest Plant and the contractor was Ralph Alexander Lind. It was built at a cost of £3,030.

The Landsborough Shire Council built the pavilion in 1937 as part of a large development scheme designed to make Kings Beach, the principal beach in Caloundra, a premier holiday attraction. During the 1930s several local councils in south east Queensland, including the councils at the South Coast (now known as the Gold Coast) and Redcliffe, were developing their foreshore areas to encourage holiday makers, thereby increasing trade and land value. Resources were made available by the Queensland Government for these schemes through the unemployment relief initiatives. Unlike the councils at the South Coast who were developing already popular and long established beaches, the development at Kings Beach was the first major effort by the local council to establish Caloundra as a sea-side resort.

Queensland has a long tradition of establishing sea-side resorts. Sandgate, and, to a lesser extent Cleveland, were popular destinations in the 1860s for beach-goers. The south coast regions, particularly Southport, developed during the 1880s when transport and roads improved. During the 1920s when public bathing in sea water became widely accepted, various councils became competitive in their quest for holiday makers. The north coast regions, including Caloundra and Redcliffe, developed as holiday destinations during this period.

Caloundra was opened for selection in 1860, by 1875 a large parcel of land within Caloundra was purchased by Robert Bulcock a prominent Brisbane politician and temperance advocate. Bulcock and his family retained this land for many years prohibiting further development of part of Caloundra, including what was to become Kings Beach. The first subdivision in 1917 saw the development of land to the south the Kings Beach area. It was not until 1926, with the second subdivision that the land adjacent to Kings Beach was opened for settlement and commercial interests.

Interest in Caloundra as a seaside resort was well established by the 1930s. From 1888 guest houses were operating with guests including the Queensland Governor, Thomas McIlwraith. The North Coast railway line was extended to Landsborough, eight miles west of Caloundra, in 1889. However lack of roads between the towns hindered further development of Caloundra for many years. Mr Allan King, a local resident, constructed a guest house near Bulcock's land in 1899, which was to lend its name to the popular beach where the house guests bathed, Kings Beach. The guesthouse was extended in 1930 after the second subdivision of Bulcock's land allowed further settlement and the opening of shops and kiosks further increased holiday trade.

With the improvement of roads Caloundra became more popular and the Landsborough Shire Council implemented a scheme for the development of the Kings Beach area, which was the premier beach in the district by this stage. In 1928 the Council enhanced the natural rock pools on the foreshore increasing their popularity with families. The Metropolitan Surf Life Saving Club started patrolling the beach in 1933, after moving from Bribie Island. By 1937 a large development scheme was undertaken which involved the expenditure of £12,290, for dressing sheds and kiosk, extensive car-parking facilities and landscaping of the Kings Beach area. The scheme also involved the beautification of other less popular beaches in the area, including Golden Beach, Dicky Beach, Bulcock Beach and Shelley Beach, but the combined sum of this expenditure was £610. The money for the scheme was subsidised by the Queensland Government, £9,251 being loan and £3,039 being subsidy.

The council commissioned Clifford E. Plant as the architect for the pavilion, and the tender was accepted for RA Lind in February 1937. The Redcliffe City Council employed a similar scheme to attract visitors in 1937 which involved the construction of five pavilions designed by Clifford E. Plant. The design of these pavilions is influenced by a Mediterranean style of architecture, dissimilar in layout and form to the pavilion at Kings Beach, although some detailing such as the glazed brick columns and windows sills and heads are similar . At least four of these pavilions exist in 1994.

According to the local press of the day, the dressing sheds were designed as to be an adornment to the beach. They were built of brick and plaster with a red roof, adding a touch of vivid colour to the already picturesque scene. It was designed to be an L-shaped building but this initial scheme was not realised due to financial constraints and the pavilion was built with the toilet wings lying adjacent to one another extending north from the principal core. The building contained a small kiosk, a small spare room to the rear of the kiosk, an entrance vestibule with ticket box and the open air toilet wings.

When opened, the pavilion was leased by a Mr T. Fiege, who ran the kiosk and maintained the toilet areas. Various alterations were made to the building during the time of Mr Fiege's lease including the replacement of the grille doors into the hall with timber doors and the addition of a small timber room to the rear of the pavilion. During the 1940s the tenants struggled to meet the lease payments required by the council, due to constraints on quantity and type of merchandise able to be sold in the kiosk. This by-law was imposed by the council at the behest of surrounding businesses. For several years during the 1950s the Surf Life Saving Club were stationed in the pavilion while a new club house was built adjacent to the pavilion. The Surf Life Saving Nippers were housed in the building from 1971 until 1980 when the kiosk was re-opened. In 1977 a public pool was opened on the east side of the building on the beach front. During the 1980s the kiosk tenants again struggled to meet lease requirements and it was closed by 1992 when the space was leased by the surf life saving club for use as a gymnasium. The public toilets and change rooms have remained in use since 1937. Alterations were carried out in 1966, replacing existing sanitary and shower fittings, seating and cubicle doors.

== Description ==
The pavilion is a one-storey brick and concrete building, roofed with large gauge corrugated fibrous cement tiles and surrounded on two sides by retaining walls. A simple timber fence encircles sections of the pavilion and grounds. The foreshore area features natural rock pools

The pavilion has a principal core containing a large room with adjoining smaller rooms. A projecting decorative parapeted gable on the east facade forms the entrance to these areas. Another entrance opens onto a vestibule through which the toilet wing is accessed.. The toilet wings have open air central walkways with skillion awnings over the toilets and change rooms on either side of the walkway. The external walls are generally cavity brick rendered with roughcast stucco and internal walls are of painted single and double brickwork.

The asymmetrically arranged east facade features a decorative parapeted gable with loggia of round head arches with edge detailing supported on glazed brick columns which sit on a concrete slab. The gable has edge detailing which integrates a central cartouche-like element. An arched opening adjacent to the loggia on this face opens onto the entrance vestibule. The openings house double timber doors which are framed and braced. The side wing is a simple structure with external parapet walls which step up the ends of the east and west faces. These walls are decorated with a high level band of smooth render, upon which are inscribed hexagonal shapes at regular intervals. The southern facade features a projecting decorative parapeted gable, similarly detailed to that found on the eastern face. The gable houses two round head arched window openings. The windows throughout the pavilion have glazed brick sills and heads, some of which have been painted over.

The interior of the pavilion has a concrete slab floor throughout, which is gently sloped in the toilet areas. The ceiling is timber braced fibrous cement sheeting in the principal areas and exposed to the roof sheeting in the toilet space. The entrance vestibule has evidence of the layout of early ticket boxes in the concrete floor and early signs near the two openings to the toilets. The toilet, shower and changing cubicles sit on a concrete plinth on either side of a central walkway which is open air. A rendered masonry wall which project above the level of the external walls divide the original toilet areas from the general change rooms and locker areas. The cubicles are roofed with thin gauge fibrous cement and corrugated iron sheeting. The toilet cubicles have been extended into the corridor increasing their overall length.

== Heritage listing ==
Kings Beach Bathing Pavilion was listed on the Queensland Heritage Register on 23 April 1999 having satisfied the following criteria.

The place is important in demonstrating the evolution or pattern of Queensland's history.

The bathing pavilion is evidence of the development of Caloundra as a holiday resort, and provides one of the first examples of the local council's provision of public facilities to enhance the growth of the region as a holiday destination. It has a strong association with the Caloundra Surf Life Saving Club.

The place demonstrates rare, uncommon or endangered aspects of Queensland's cultural heritage.

The building is a rare example of the built environment at Caloundra of the 1930s.

The place is important in demonstrating the principal characteristics of a particular class of cultural places.

The pavilion has evidence of the layout of a 1930s changing and open air toilet facility. The building is an example of the work of Brisbane architect Clifford E. Plant, and of Spanish Mission architectural influence.
