= Kings Beach, Queensland =

Kings Beach
- Suburb
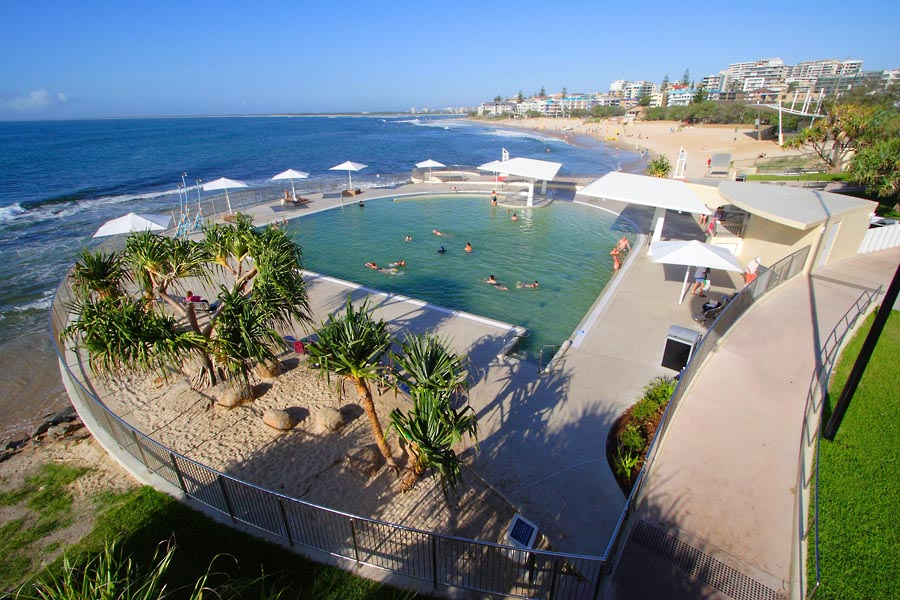
- Pool at Kings Beach

- Interactive map of Kings Beach
- Coordinates: 26.8019°S 153.1436°E
- Country: Australia
- State: Queensland
- City: Caloundra
- LGA: Sunshine Coast Region
- Location: 1.0 km (0.62 mi) E of Caloundra CBD; 93 km (58 mi) N of Brisbane

Government
  - State electorate: Caloundra
  - Federal division: Fisher

Area
  - Total: 0.6 km^{2} (0.23 sq mi)

Population
  - Total: 3,042 (2021 census)
  - Density: 5,100/km^{2} (13,100/sq mi)
- Time zone: UTC+10:00 (AEST)
- Postcode: 4551
- County: Canning
- Parish: Bribie
Suburbs around Kings Beach
Moffat Beach	Shelly Beach	Coral Sea
Caloundra CBD	Kings Beach	Coral Sea
Caloundra CBD	Coral Sea	Coral Sea

Kings Beach is a coastal suburb of Caloundra in the Sunshine Coast Region, Queensland, Australia, located directly east of Caloundra CBD. In the 2021 census, Kings Beach had a population of 3,042 people.

== Geography ==
The suburb faces the Coral Sea from its north-east to its south, with a sandy beach to the south and south-east and a rocky headland to the north and north-east. The suburb locality is quite hilly ranging from the beach at sea level to the north-west of the locality at over 40 metres (130 ft) and the headland is at 20 metres (66 ft).

The suburb has medium-density housing, both permanently occupied and for holiday accommodation. The commercial development is mostly along the beach front where there are also amenities for beach visitors (showers and toilets). There is parkland along the beach front and a walking path around the headland.

== History ==
Kings Beach was named after the King family, the first European residents in the area. After living at Moffat Head in James Moffat's home for a while, they moved to the Kings Beach area in 1893.

St Andrew's Anglican Church was dedicated on Sunday 22 January 1939 by Archbishop William Wand. The construction of the church had been strongly encouraged by Wand who holidayed at Caloundra with his friend Queensland Governor Leslie Wilson. The Governor also attended the church's dedication. On 10 December 1966 the foundation stone of the new church was laid Archbishop Philip Strong, who opened and dedicated the new church on 8 December 1967. The new church was consecrated in 1974.

Within Kings Beach's boundaries is Wickham Head, a headland off which the hospital ship AHS Centaur is believed to have been sunk by Japanese submarines in 1943.

== Demographics ==
In the 2016 census, Kings Beach had a population of 2,788 people.

In the 2021 census, Kings Beach had a population of 3,042 people.

== Heritage listings ==
Kings Beach has a number of heritage-listed sites, including:

- Caloundra Lighthouses, 6 Arthur Street and 3 Canberra Terrace
- Kings Beach Bathing Pavilion, Ormonde Terrace

== Education ==
There are no schools in Kings Beach. The nearest government are primary and secondary schools are Caloundra State School and Caloundra State High School, both in neighbouring Caloundra CBD to the west.

== Amenities ==
St Andrew's Anglican Church is at 46 Upper Gay Terrace, Kings Beach (26.8032°S 153.1381°E).
