= David Fleay =

Australian scientist (1907–1993)

David Howells Fleay AM MBE
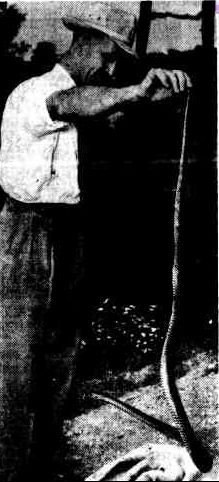
- David Fleay and a brown snake, 1954
- Born: 6 January 1907; Ballarat, Victoria, Australia
- Died: 7 August 1993 (aged 86)
- Education: Ballarat Grammar School
- Occupation: Biologist
- Known for: Captive breeding of endangered species

David Howells Fleay AM MBE (/ˈflaɪ/; 6 January 1907 – 7 August 1993) was an Australian scientist and biologist who pioneered the captive breeding of endangered species, and was the first person to breed the platypus (Ornithorhynchus anatinus) in captivity.

He died on 7 August 1993 aged 86.

== Early life ==
Fleay was born in Ballarat, Victoria, and had an aesthetic upbringing. His mother, Maude Edith Victoria Fleay, was a notable wildlife artist and had studied painting under Fred McCubbin; his father, William Henry Fleay, was a manufacturing chemist in Ballarat. After education at a state primary school and later a private high school, Ballarat Grammar School, Fleay was first employed in his father's chemist shop and then was briefly a teacher at Ballarat Grammar.

He left for Melbourne in 1927 to study for a Bachelor of Science degree and Diploma of Education at Melbourne University. There, he met another student, Mary Sigrid Collie, and they married in 1931, the same year that Fleay graduated having majored in zoology, botany and education.

== Work in natural science ==
Fleay's interest in the natural world coincided with the awakening of scientific interest in endangered species, and the realisation by the public that Australian animals were worthy of attention other than as a source of food.

He realised the importance of endangered species early in his career when, in 1933, he was the last person to photograph a captive thylacine or Tasmanian tiger at the Hobart Zoo. In the process he was bitten on the buttocks, the scar from the injury carried proudly throughout his life.

In 1934, Fleay was asked to design and establish the Australian animal section at Melbourne Zoo, and worked there for four years. During this time he had several scientific achievements, including the first breeding in captivity of the emu, several bird species including the tawny frogmouth, and marsupials including the koala. He also commenced research into the breeding habits of the platypus. His next public education efforts were nature talks on a Melbourne radio station, in 1937. Later that year, disagreements with the zoo's management came to a head and Fleay was dismissed, principally because of his belief that native birds and animals should be fed what they would eat in the wild.

In 1962 Fleay co-founded the Wildlife Preservation Society of Queensland with Judith Wright, Brian Clouston and Kathleen McArthur.

=== Healesville Sanctuary ===
Coincidentally, the Healesville Sanctuary some 90 km from Melbourne was in need of a director and he was appointed. The animals there included quolls, Tasmanian devils, dingoes and various birds of prey, to which he added tiger snakes that were milked for antivenene, and platypus. Many animals were housed in large paddock-like areas with swing-weighted gates so that visitors could freely interact with the animals. He also conducted daily 'feeding' displays of the platypuses.

His greatest achievement at Healesville was in 1943, when he bred the first platypus in captivity. His platypusary (platypus enclosure) incorporated features of their native streams. On about 5 November 1943, "Corrie" was born. No-one other than Fleay successfully bred and reared a platypus until 1998 when Healesville Sanctuary again had success. Since then, breeding has occurred only twice more: at Healesville and Taronga Zoo (twins).

Between 1945–1947, Fleay led an expedition to Tasmania in an attempt to capture a breeding pair of thylacines; however, he returned empty handed.

In 1947, he took three platypuses to New York for the Bronx Zoo where they occupied a platypusary built to his specifications. He studied animal husbandry at various zoos and wildlife sanctuaries across the US, returning to Healesville in October to discover that the Board had dismissed him for supposed unauthorised donations of animals to various foreign zoos. While untrue, this caused considerable hurt: He was demoted and remained at Healesville as a consultant.

He was also keeping a private collection of animals, but in 1951 the Government of Victoria legislated to prevent private individuals from charging fees for the public to see animal collections. This caused him to decide to move the collection.

=== Burleigh, Queensland ===
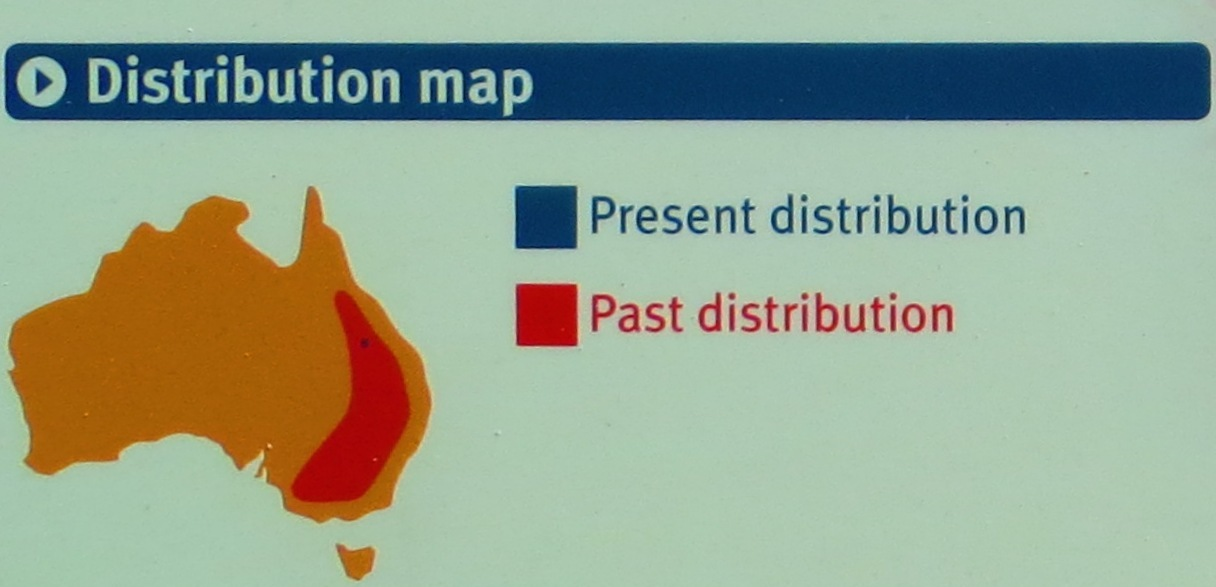
Map showing past and present distribution of the bridled nailtail wallaby. This map is an inset from a sign located at David Fleay Wildlife Park in Burleigh Heads, Queensland.

After extensive research, the Tallebudgera Estuary in the hinterland behind Burleigh on the Gold Coast in Queensland was selected, the reasons including that it offered an untouched natural habitat for koalas apart from already having cleared areas (then farmland) for development of animal enclosures. The Fleays gradually acquired land and by 1958 had enclosures for people to see platypuses, snakes, dingoes, plain turkeys, ospreys, crocodiles and alligators; in contrast, bandicoots, flying foxes, sea eagles, wallabies and koalas, were free to visit from adjoining the forest. However, his focus was on the scientific study of the animals.

The area also included middens used by earlier generations of the Gold Coast's Kombumerri Aboriginal people. Fleay retained these heritage areas, and maintained good relationships with the Kombumerri.

The animals were fed partly from donations from local bakers and butchers, with local residents donating dead animals to feed the owls (or the goannas if no longer fresh); mice and rats were collected frequently from the McKerras Research Institute behind the hospital; worms were collected fresh daily for the platypuses; eels, pigeons and flying foxes were also killed to provide food for the owls, snakes and crocodiles.

Injured or sick animals from as far away as New Guinea and Central Queensland were accommodated at the sanctuary. Those that lived were kept for research or breeding; native animals, when recovered, were released into the wild; deceased animals were fed to the survivors.

In 1982, 37 acres (150,000 m²) of the land owned by David and Sigrid Fleay was sold to the Queensland Government and became a Conservation Park. The following year, the 20 acre (81,000 m²) main Fauna Reserve with its animal enclosures was also sold to the Government. The remainder of the site 7.5 acres (30,000 m²) was transferred in 1985. Under the terms of this arrangement, David and Sigrid Fleay continued to live and work at the park: In 1983 it closed for five years for redevelopment and re-opened in 1988. The government retains the property as the David Fleay Wildlife Park.

== Achievements ==
- First captive breeding of the platypus (1943), mulgara (1955), planigale (midget marsupial) (1958), taipan (snake) (1960), powerful owl Ninox strenua (1968), greater sooty owl Tyto tenebricosa (1969), grey goshawk (1971), Australian masked owl Tyto novaehollandiae (1971), Australasian grass owl Tyto longimembris (1972), crested hawk (1975), wedge-tailed eagle Aquila audax (1977), and fluffy glider Petaurus australis (1988).
- Extensive snake venom production, including death adders, brown snakes, mulga snakes and tiger snakes for Dr C.H. Kellaway of The Walter and Eliza Hall Institute of Medical Research.

== Honours ==
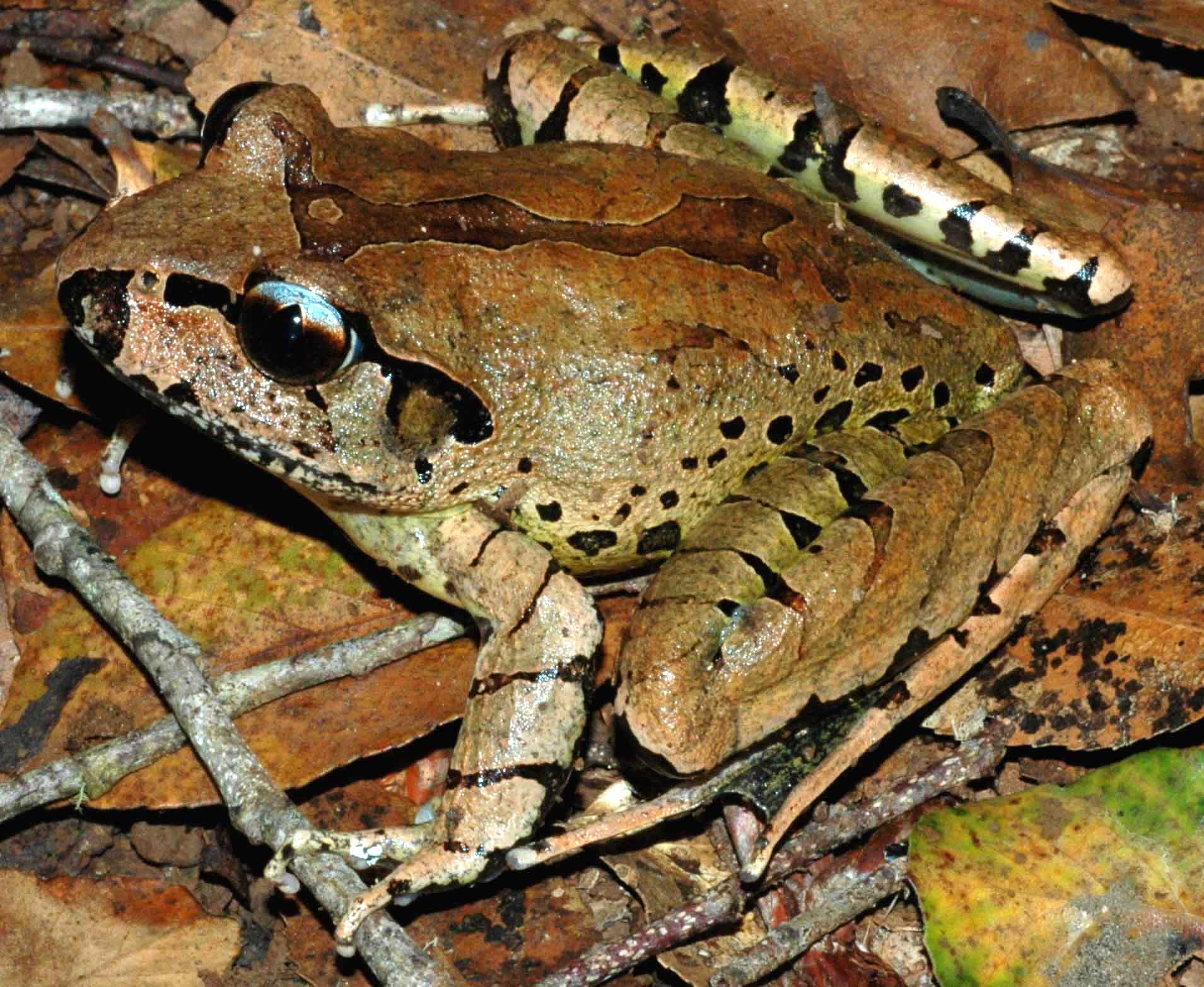
Fleay's barred frog (Mixophyes fleayi) was named after David Fleay.

- Australian Natural History Medallion for 1940, inaugural awardee
- elected as a Corresponding Member of the Zoological Society of London in 1945
- elected as a Corresponding Member (Life) of the New York Zoological Society in 1947
- Appointed Member of the Order of the British Empire (MBE) in 1960
- Associate of the Queensland Museum in 1978
- Fellow of the Explorers Club in New York in 1979
- Member of the Order of Australia (AM) in 1980
- Advance Australia Award in 1980
- honorary Doctorate of Science by the University of Queensland in 1984
- appointed a Rotary Paul Harris Fellow in 1984

=== Animals bearing his name ===
- Fleay's barred frog (Mixophyes fleayi)
- the Tasmanian wedge-tailed eagle (Aquala audax fleayii), a separate sub-species identified by Fleay

== Publications ==
- We Breed the Platypus (1944)
- Gliders of the gum trees: the most beautiful and enchanting Australian marsupials (1947)
- Talking of Animals (1956, reprinted 1960)
- Living with Animals (1960)
- Nightwatchmen of Bush and Plain (1968)
- Paradoxical Platypus (1980)
- Looking at Animals (1981)
- photographs featured in E. Byrne's The Unique Animals of Australia (1961)
- Extensive writing as a newspaper columnist on natural history topics
- Scientific papers including in The Victorian Naturalist, The Australian Zoologist, Walkabout and Wild Life
