= Aroona, Queensland =

Aroona
- Suburb
- Interactive map of Aroona
- Coordinates: 26.7830°S 153.1169°E
- Country: Australia
- State: Queensland
- City: Caloundra
- LGA: Sunshine Coast Region
- Location: 4.4 km (2.7 mi) N of Caloundra CBD; 89.9 km (55.9 mi) N of Brisbane

Government
  - State electorate: Kawana
  - Federal division: Fisher

Area
  - Total: 1.9 km^{2} (0.73 sq mi)

Population
  - Total: 3,466 (2021 census)
  - Density: 1,820/km^{2} (4,720/sq mi)
- Time zone: UTC+10:00 (AEST)
- Postcode: 4551
- County: Canning
- Parish: Bribie
Suburbs around Aroona
Meridan Plains	Currimundi	Battery Hill
Little Mountain	Aroona	Battery Hill
Little Mountain	Caloundra West	Caloundra

Aroona is a suburb of Caloundra in the Sunshine Coast Region, Queensland, Australia. In the 2021 census, Aroona had a population of 3,466 people.

== Geography ==
Aroona is located within the urban centre 4.4 kilometres (3 mi) north of Caloundra.

== History ==
Aroona is an Aboriginal word meaning "place of refreshing" or "place of running water".

== Demographics ==
In the 2016 census, Aroona recorded a population of 3,287 people, 50.2% female and 49.8% male. The median age of the Aroona population was 43 years, 5 years above the national median of 38, with 79% of people born in Australia. The other top responses for country of birth were England 5.6%, New Zealand 4.4%, Scotland 0.7%, South Africa 0.6% and Netherlands 0.5%. 93.5% of people spoke only English at home; the next most common languages were 0.5% German, 0.3% Dutch, 0.3% Swedish, 0.3% Italian, 0.2% Dari.

In the 2021 census, Aroona had a population of 3,466 people.

== Education ==
There are no schools in Aroona. The nearest government primary schools are in Currimundi State School in neighbouring Currimundi, Caloundra State School in Caloundra, and Meridan State College in Meridan Plains. The nearest government secondary schools are Caloundra State High School in Caloundra and Meridan State College in Meridan Plains.

== Facilities ==
Sugarbag Road Reservoir is a water treatment plant (26.7848°S 153.1150°E).

== Amenities ==
There are a number of parks in Aroona:

- Aroona Park (26.7816°S 153.1184°E)
- Bapaume Park (26.7796°S 153.1247°E)
- Juno Park (26.7812°S 153.1229°E)
- Kalana Park (26.7790°S 153.1257°E)
- Kestrel Park (26.7889°S 153.1212°E)
- Michael Olm Park (26.7769°S 153.1127°E)
- Ocean Ridge Park (26.7851°S 153.1215°E)
- Ridgehaven Natural Amenity Reserve (26.7792°S 153.1097°E)
- Ridgehaven Park (26.7764°S 153.1163°E)
- Rothfall Chase Reserve (26.7756°S 153.1098°E)
- Sharyn Bonney Bushland Reserve (26.7842°S 153.1097°E)
