= Battery Hill, Queensland =

Battery Hill
- Suburb
- Interactive map of Battery Hill
- Coordinates: 26.7791°S 153.1291°E
- Country: Australia
- State: Queensland
- City: Caloundra
- LGA: Sunshine Coast Region
- Location: 4.3 km (2.7 mi) N of Caloundra CBD; 91.3 km (56.7 mi) N of Brisbane

Government
  - State electorate: Caloundra
  - Federal division: Fisher

Area
  - Total: 0.9 km^{2} (0.35 sq mi)
- Elevation: 10 to 28 m (33 to 92 ft)

Population
  - Total: 2,596 (2021 census)
  - Density: 2,880/km^{2} (7,500/sq mi)
- Time zone: UTC+10:00 (AEST)
- Postcode: 4551
- County: Canning
- Parish: Bribie
Suburbs around Battery Hill
Currimundi	Currimundi	Currimundi
Aroona	Battery Hill	Dicky Beach
Aroona	Caloundra	Dicky Beach

Battery Hill is a suburb of Caloundra in the Sunshine Coast Region, Queensland, Australia. In the 2021 census, Battery Hill had a population of 2,596 people.

== Geography ==
Battery Hill is 4 kilometres (2 mi) north of Caloundra.

The suburb is bounded to the north by Buderim Road, to the east by Coonowrin Drive, to the south by Cooroora Street, and to the west by the Nicklin Way.

Battery Hill is a hill in the south-east of the locality (26.7810°S 153.1298°E) at 28 metres (92 ft) above sea level.

== Demographics ==
In the 2011 census, Battery Hill recorded a population of 2,588 people, 53.1% female and 46.9% male. The median age of the Battery Hill population was 40 years, 3 years above the national median of 37. 78.7% of people living in Battery Hill were born in Australia. The other top responses for country of birth were New Zealand 5%, England 3.9%, South Africa 0.8%, United States of America 0.8%, Netherlands 0.6%. 92.3% of people spoke only English at home; the next most common languages were 0.3% Dutch, 0.3% German, 0.3% Portuguese, 0.3% Greek, 0.3% Spanish.

In the 2016 census, Battery Hill had a population of 2,536 people.

In the 2021 census, Battery Hill had a population of 2,596 people.

== Education ==
There are no schools in Battery Hill. The nearest government primary schools are Currimundi State School in neighbouring Currimundi to the north-east and Talara Primary College also in Currimundi but to the north-west. The nearest government secondary schools are Caloundra State High School in neighbouring Caloundra to the south and Meridan State College in Meridan Plains to the west.

== Amenities ==
There are a number of parks in the suburb, including:

- Andra Ahern Park (26.7832°S 153.1271°E)
- Andrea Ahern Bushland Park (26.7837°S 153.1275°E)
- Enfield Park (26.7810°S 153.1291°E)
- Jack Keleher Park (26.7772°S 153.1294°E)
- Nicklin Way Buffer 6 (26.7799°S 153.1259°E)
- Nicklin Way Buffer 8 (26.7827°S 153.1243°E)
