= Shelly Beach, Queensland (Sunshine Coast) =

Shelly Beach
- Suburb
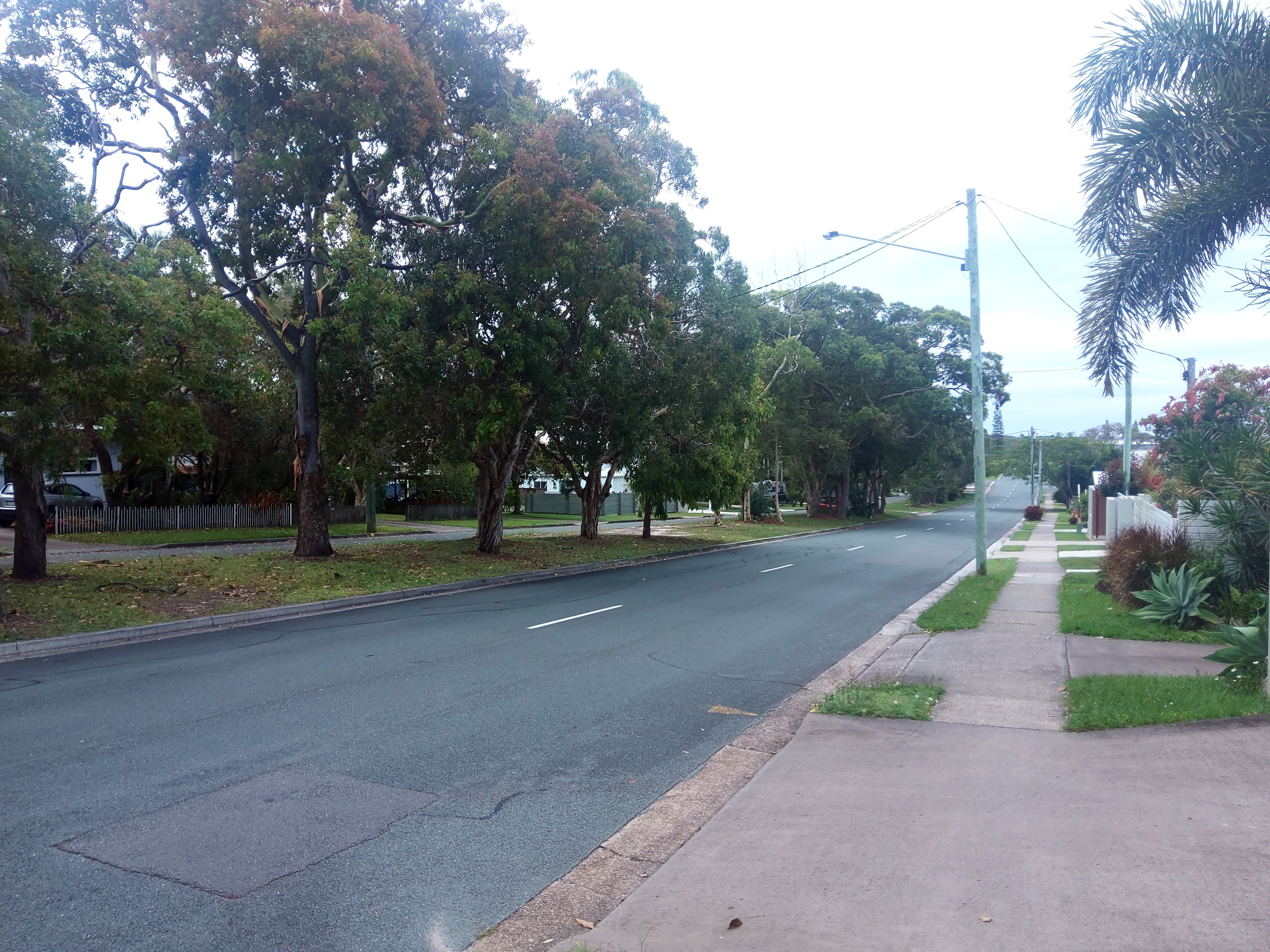
- Albert Street, 2021

- Interactive map of Shelly Beach
- Coordinates: 26.7963°S 153.1458°E
- Country: Australia
- State: Queensland
- City: Caloundra
- LGA: Sunshine Coast Region
- Location: 2.6 km (1.6 mi) NE of Caloundra CBD; 111 km (69 mi) NNE of Brisbane CBD

Government
  - State electorate: Caloundra
  - Federal division: Fisher

Area
  - Total: 0.5 km^{2} (0.19 sq mi)

Population
  - Total: 925 (2021 census)
  - Density: 1,850/km^{2} (4,800/sq mi)
- Time zone: UTC+10:00 (AEST)
- Postcode: 4551
- County: Canning
- Parish: Bribie
Suburbs around Shelly Beach
Moffat Beach	Moffat Beach	Coral Sea
Moffat Beach	Shelly Beach	Coral Sea
Kings Beach	Kings Beach	Coral Sea

Shelly Beach is a coastal suburb of Caloundra in the Sunshine Coast Region, Queensland, Australia. In the 2021 census, Shelly Beach had a population of 925 people.

== Geography ==
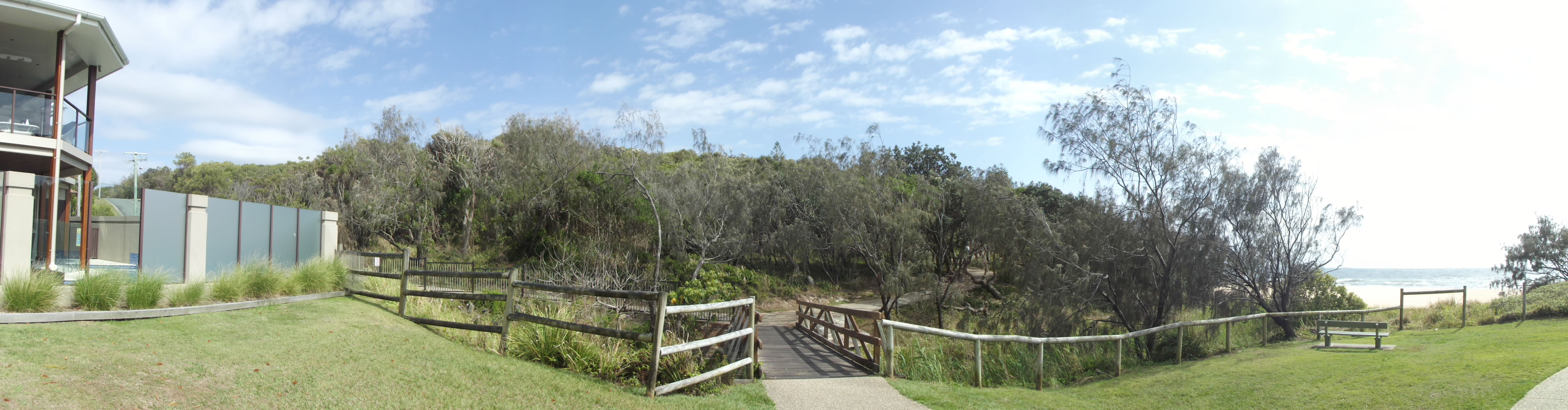
Foot bridge at Shelly Beach connecting to neighbouring Moffat Beach

The suburb presumably takes its name from the beach known as Shelly Beach (26.7964°S 153.1484°E) along the suburb's coastline.

== History ==
Our Lady of the Rosary Catholic School opened on 29 January 1980 by the Sisters of St Joseph, but is now under lay leadership.

== Demographics ==
In the 2016 census, Shelly Beach had a population of 854 people.

In the 2021 census, Shelly Beach had a population of 925 people.

== Education ==
Our Lady of the Rosary School is a Catholic primary (Prep–6) school for boys and girls at 63 Edmund Street (corner of Alfred Street, 26.7972°S 153.1437°E). In 2017, the school had an enrolment of 313 students with 22 teachers (19 full-time equivalent) and 14 non-teaching staff (8 full-time equivalent). In 2018, the school had an enrolment of 334 students with 23 teachers (20 full-time equivalent) and 15 non-teaching staff (10 full-time equivalent). In 2022, the school had 348 students with 24 teachers (19.1 full-time equivalent) and 17 non-teaching staff (12.8 full-time equivalent).

There are no government schools in Shelly Beach. The nearest government primary and secondary schools are Caloundra State School and Caloundra State High School, both in Caloundra CBD to the west.
