= Wildlife Preservation Society of Queensland =

- Wildlife Preservation Society of Queensland Logo
- Founded: 1962; 64 years ago
- Founder: Judith Wright; Brian Clouston; David Fleay; Kathleen MacArthur
- Type: Not-for-profit
- Purpose: Wildlife conservation
- Location: Brisbane, Australia
- Method: Protecting wildlife Influencing choices Engaging communities
- Key people: Simon Baltais; Margaret Thorsborne
- Website: wildlife.org.au

The Wildlife Preservation Society of Queensland (Wildlife Queensland) based in Queensland, Australia is a not-for-profit organisation which aims to engage communities to deliver conservation outcomes.

Founded in 1962, Wildlife Queensland works with community groups, schools, government, private landholders and businesses to achieve conservation goals. With over 5,000 supporters, members and dedicated volunteers at head office in Brisbane and branches throughout the state, Wildlife Queensland draws attention to wildlife's plight and conservation and by consulting with government departments, raises awareness at every level.

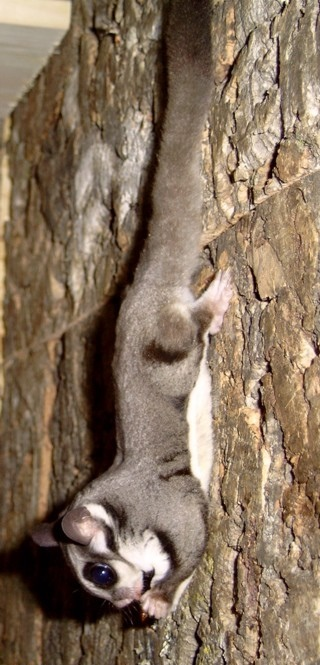
Sugar Glider

== Background ==
Wildlife Queensland is the oldest and largest wildlife-focused conservation group in Queensland, and been a part of all the major conservation issues in Queensland for 50 years.

Early campaigns protected important places such as the Great Barrier Reef, the Hinchinbrook Channel and Fraser Island. The organisation has encouraged governments to protect important habitats from the coast to the rainforests through planning and legislation. Founded to educate the community about wildlife and wildlife issues, and sharing information via the Wildlife Queensland website, publications, nature journal Wildlife Australia and regular special events such as the Batty Boat Cruises. All campaigns and submissions are based on policies created, debated and written by members, such as biodiversity, population and water policies.

== History ==
The first members were concerned about the increasing destruction of the natural environment and felt that by establishing an organisation to work for conservation and continuing environmental education, the community could be encouraged to be aware of, and accept, sound conservation ideals. The society was created as a community-based, non-profit organisation, founded in 1962 by Judith Wright, Brian Clouston, David Fleay and Kathleen MacArthur. Current patron, Margaret Thorsborne, is an eminent veteran conservationist who worked alongside Judith Wright in the original campaign to protect the Great Barrier Reef in 1967.

Currimundi Lake (Kathleen McArthur) Conservation Park in Currimundi, Queensland is named was named after founding member Kathleen MacArthur.

== Objectives ==
Wildlife Queensland's objectives as set out in the constitution are:

- To preserve the fauna and flora of Australia by all lawful means.
- To educate by all means possible all sections of the community, particularly the young, in an understanding of the principles of conservation and preservation of the natural environment.
- To discourage by all legal means possible the destruction, exploitation and unnecessary development of any part of the natural environment.
- To encourage rational land use and proper planning of future development and use of the natural environment and management thereof.

== Current projects ==
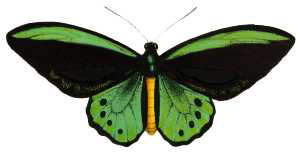
Richmond birdwing butterfly

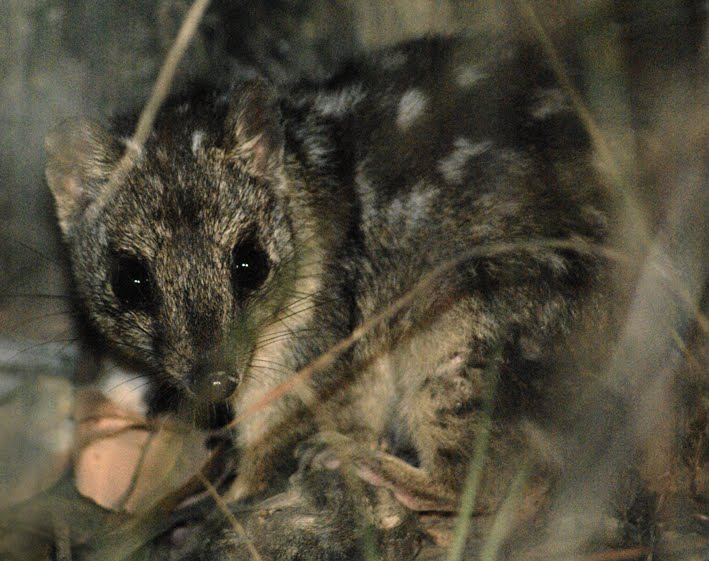
Northern quoll, 2009

Wildlife Queensland has numerous ongoing projects aimed at the conservation of various forms of wildlife, involving members and communities. These include the following:

- Queensland Glider Network (QGN) raises awareness of gliders, their habitat requirements, and to improve community knowledge and research of gliders.
- QuollSeekers Network (QSN) was established to gather information on quoll populations and support their continued existence.
- Richmond birdwing Conservation Network (RBCN) is an affiliation of individuals, groups and organisations dedicated to the conservation of the Richmond birdwing butterfly and its host plants, the Richmond birdwing vine and mountain aristolochia.
- EchidnaWatch collates information on the distribution of this elusive monotreme in Queensland, sharing this information with Wildlife Online, the public and other organisations.
- PlatypusWatch is a community-based program that aims to document where platypus occur to develop a reliable 'snapshot' of platypus populations.
- MangroveWatch is a community monitoring program that will help keep track of the health of the mangroves in Moreton Bay.
- Seagrass-Watch raises awareness of the condition and trends of seagrass populations and to provide an early warning of major coastal environmental changes.
- FaunaWatch is a program which collects and compiles sighting information submitted by community volunteers to identify changes as early as possible, so that fauna protection plans can be established.
- Ornate Rainbowfish Project aims to save the ornate rainbowfish from extinction by identifying the location of populations of this species and potential suitable habitats.

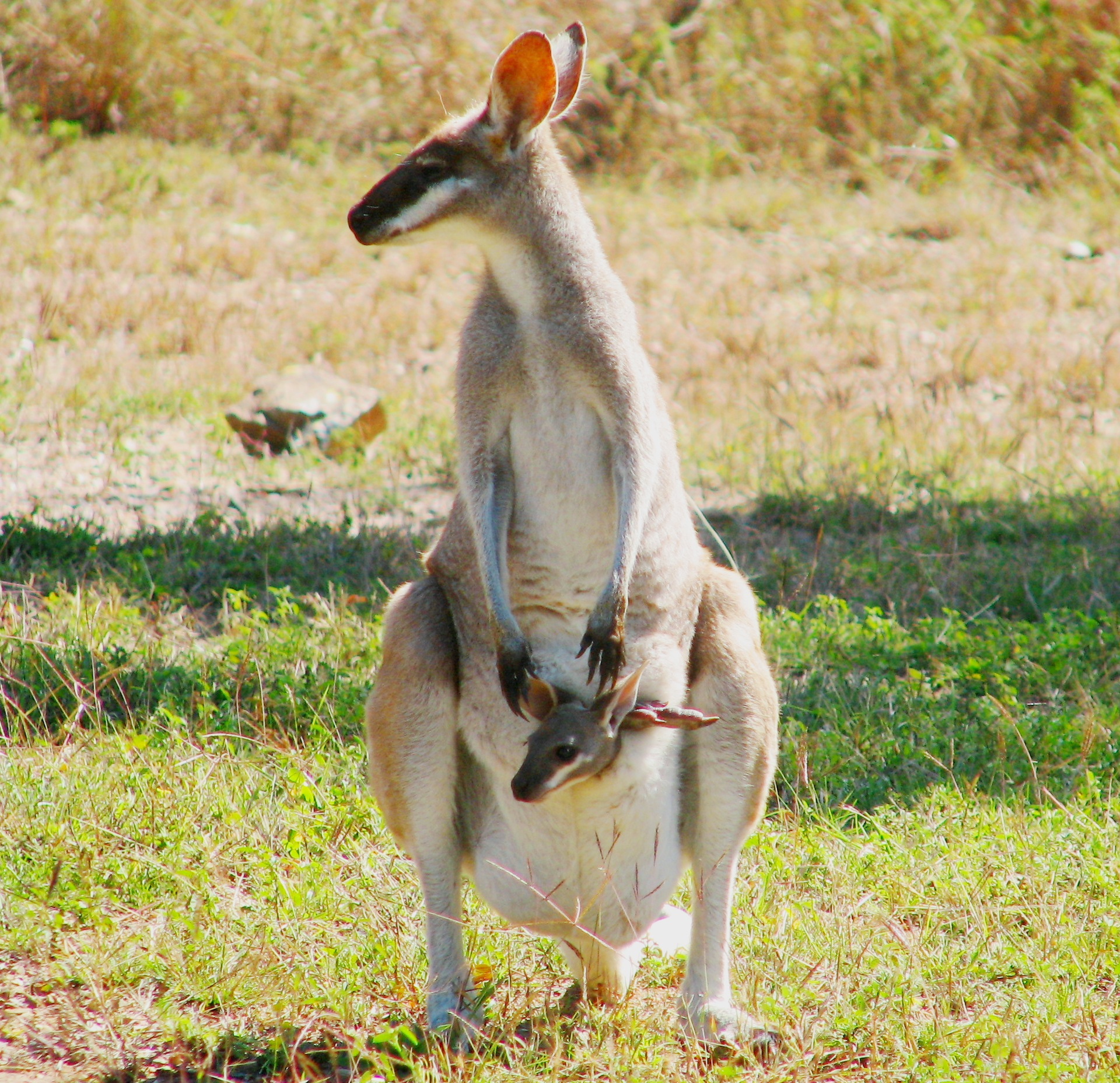
Whiptail Wallaby

== Achievements ==
Achievements include;

- The whiptail wallaby no longer being shot commercially in Queensland.
- Successfully helping to stop the recreational hunting of duck and quail in Queensland.
- The conservation, profiling and protection of platypus, quolls, echidnas, and gliders.
- Campaigning against the introduction of gillnetting and the proposal for targeted killing of rays and sharks.
- Wildlife Queensland campaigned for the protection of the Great Barrier Reef against limestone mining and oil drilling, resulting in the listing of the Great Barrier Reef as a World Heritage area in 1981.
- Successful campaigning to stop logging and sand-mining on Fraser Island.

== Investing in the future ==
Wildlife Queensland runs a ‘Student Research Grants Program’ available to students at Queensland universities. Five grants of $1,000 each are awarded each year. Eligible research projects are those which investigate methods of addressing or reversing the decline in threatened native plant and animal species or their habitat, or other applied conservation outcomes in Queensland. This incorporates biodiversity conservation including endangered species, vegetation communities and regional ecosystems.

== Awards ==
Every year Wildlife Queensland recognises the achievements and efforts of members through a special award ceremony held at an annual dinner in September. The categories are:

- A successful Wildlife Queensland campaign in your region.
- A new or ongoing Wildlife Queensland project involving the community.
- The Margaret Thorsborne Award for an outstanding contribution by a member.

== Community engagement ==
Community engagement is facilitated through free participation in projects involving research, field work, and community education days, as well as formal events, excursions, educational presentations, branch memberships and organisational memberships. This aims to educate and raise awareness of current issues and projects, and along with voluntary contributions and donations, contributes to the ongoing process of conserving Queensland’s wildlife.

== See also ==
- Conservation in Australia
