= SS Dicky =

1883 German steamship

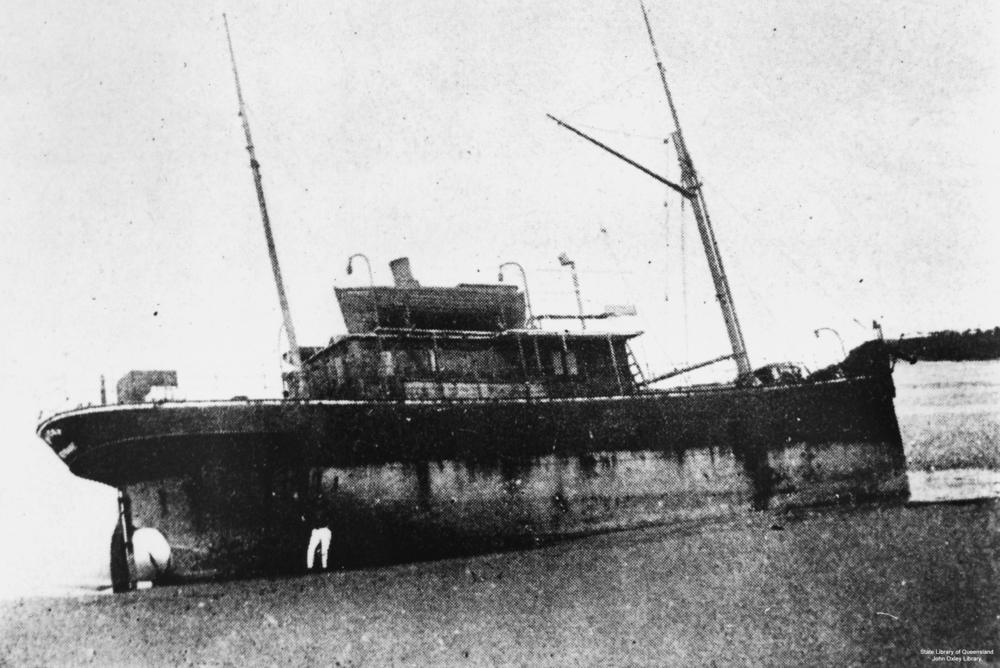
- Dicky grounded near Caloundra Head in 1893.

History
- Name: Dicky
- Builder: Gebruder Howdalt, Kiel, Germany
- Launched: 1883
- Fate: Wrecked 4 February 1893

General characteristics
- Tonnage: 226 gross

Dicky was a 226-gross ton steamer, built by Gebruder Howdalt, Kiel in 1883.

== Fate ==
On 4 February 1893, while steaming in bad weather off the coast of Queensland, Australia, Dicky was blown ashore at Caloundra, on a stretch of coast now known as Dicky Beach.

== Partial wreck removal ==
The Sunshine Coast Council began removing the visible parts of the wreck on 30 July 2015.
