= Moffat Beach, Queensland =

Moffat Beach
- Suburb
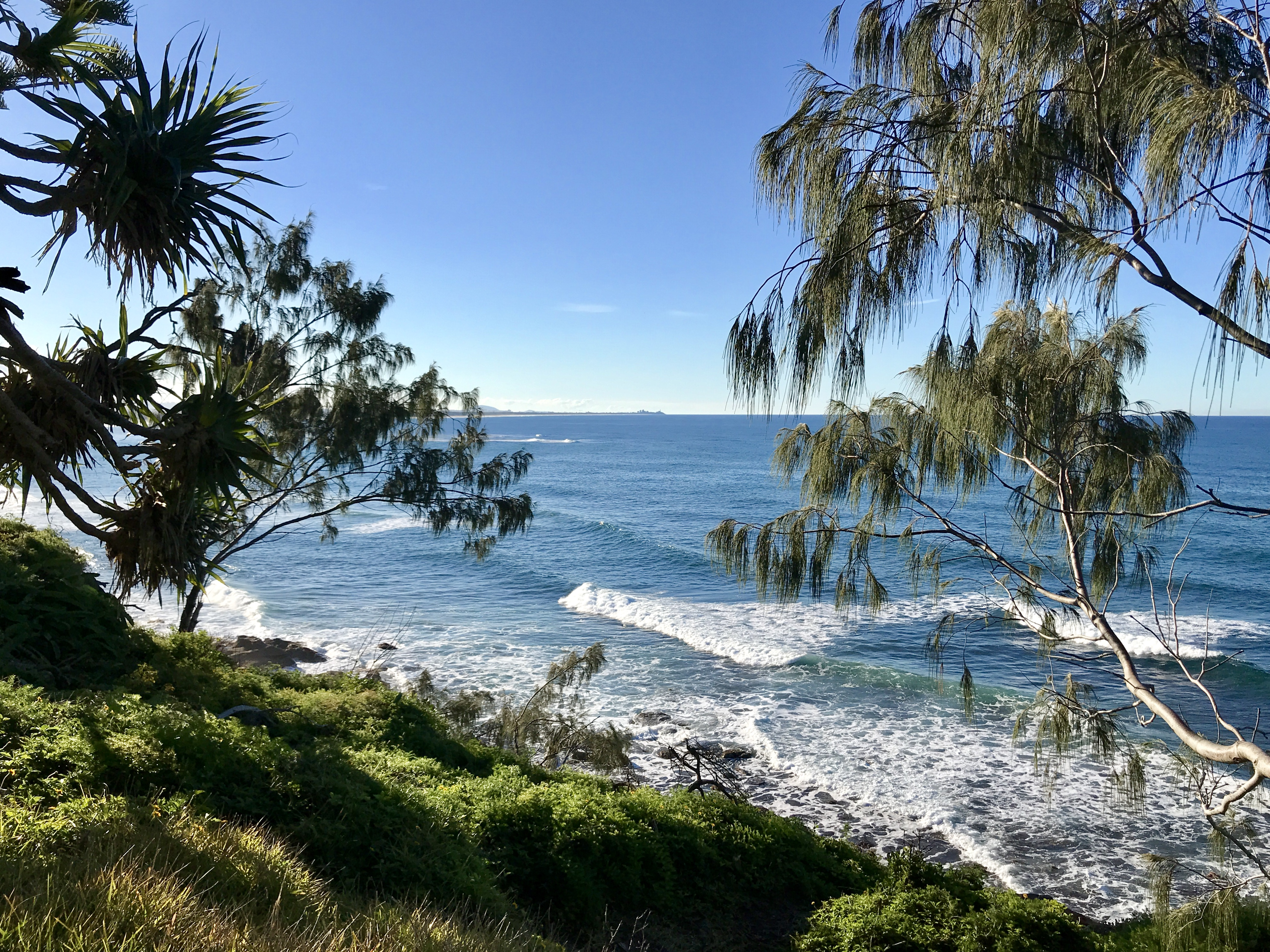
- Views from Moffat Head, 2018

- Interactive map of Moffat Beach
- Coordinates: 26.7933°S 153.1386°E
- Country: Australia
- State: Queensland
- City: Caloundra
- LGA: Sunshine Coast Region
- Location: 2.1 km (1.3 mi) NE of Caloundra; 93.4 km (58.0 mi) N of Brisbane

Government
  - State electorate: Caloundra
  - Federal division: Fisher

Area
  - Total: 1.4 km^{2} (0.54 sq mi)

Population
  - Total: 2,691 (2021 census)
  - Density: 1,920/km^{2} (4,980/sq mi)
- Time zone: UTC+10:00 (AEST)
- Postcode: 4551
- County: Canning
- Parish: Bribie
Suburbs around Moffat Beach
Caloundra	Dicky Beach	Coral Sea
Caloundra	Moffat Beach	Shelly Beach
Caloundra	Caloundra	Kings Beach

Moffat Beach is a coastal suburb in the Sunshine Coast Region, Queensland, Australia. In the 2021 census, Moffat Beach had a population of 2,691 people.

== Geography ==
Moffat Beach is within the Caloundra urban centre, located directly north-east of Caloundra CBD.

Moffat Beach has the following coastal features (from north to south):

- the beach at Moffat Beach (26.7892°S 153.1423°E)
- the headland Moffat Head (26.7915°S 153.1484°E)

The land use is predominantly residential. There is an industrial estate in the west of the locality.

== History ==
The suburb and beach were named after James Campbell Moffat, a chemist from Brisbane, who acquired 20 acres (8.1 ha) of coastal land at Caloundra on 18 August 1882. A year later, he built a holiday house c. 500 metres south-east of Moffat Beach on the headland which now also bears his name.

The Queen of the Colonies pandanus tree stood on the headland above the site where 13 passengers from the Queen of the Colonies shipwreck were cast ashore in a small boat during stormy weather in April 1863 while returning from Moreton Island. In 1963, a concrete memorial was erected on the site.

In 1888, Caloundra's first guesthouse "Sea Glint" opened on a ridge overlooking present-day Moffat Beach. During this time Sir Thomas McIllwraith, Premier of Queensland, was a regular visitor to Sea Glint on the shore of Tooway Lake or Wilson's Lake as it was then known

The Caloundra Cemetery opened in 1910. The location was the site of lone grave, believed to be of the tutor to the Landsborough family, who had died in 1888 and was buried on their property. In 2024, the cemetery had run out of land for new adult burial plots, but burials can still be conducted in other circumstances.

== Demographics ==
In the 2016 census, Moffat Beach had a population of 2,553 people, made up of 1245 (48.8%) male and 1307 (51.2%) female. The median age of the Moffat Beach population was 44 years, above both the Queensland median of 37 and the Australian median of 38. 77.4% of people were born in Australia. The next most common countries of birth were England (5.1%) and New Zealand (4.5%). 92% of people only spoke English at home. Religious affiliations in Moffat Beach were predominantly No Religion (33.5%), Catholic (23.1%) and Anglican (15.4%).

In the 2021 census, Moffat Beach had a population of 2,691 people.

== Education ==
There are no schools in Moffat Beach. The nearest government primary school is Caloundra State School in neighbouring Caloundra. The nearest government secondary school is Caloundra State High School also in Caloundra.

== Parks and recreation ==
Moffat Beach Park lies between Seaview Terrace and the base of Moffat Head. Overlooking the beach, this park provides a naturally sheltered surf themed playground, as well as shelters with picnic and barbecue facilities. Off-street car parking is provided. Shade along the beachfront in the park is provided by a line of iconic Norfolk pines, believed to have been planted around 1928, that the local council notes have cultural and heritage significance to the Caloundra region.

Eleanor Shipley Park stretches from Tooway Lake through to the cafes of Seaview Terrace. Barbecue facilities and picnic shelters are provided, as well as a children's play area and easy access to Moffat beach.

On Moffat Beach, dogs are allowed off-leash before 8am and after 4pm. The beach itself is unpatrolled.

The Des Dwyer walking track is an oceanway that runs from Moffat Beach to Bulcock beach, following the coastline on cliffs and boardwalks.

== Surfing ==
Moffat Beach is protected from southerly winds by Moffat Headland which provides a point break.

One of Australia's longest-running surf competitions, the Pa and Ma Bendall Surfing Classic is held every Easter in honour of local surfing legends Charles "Pa" and Marjorie "Ma" Bendall.

== Facilities ==
Caloundra Cemetery is on Queen Street in the south-west of the locality (26.7934°S 153.1304°E). It has about 2,600 burials.
