= Currimundi, Queensland =

Currimundi
- Suburb
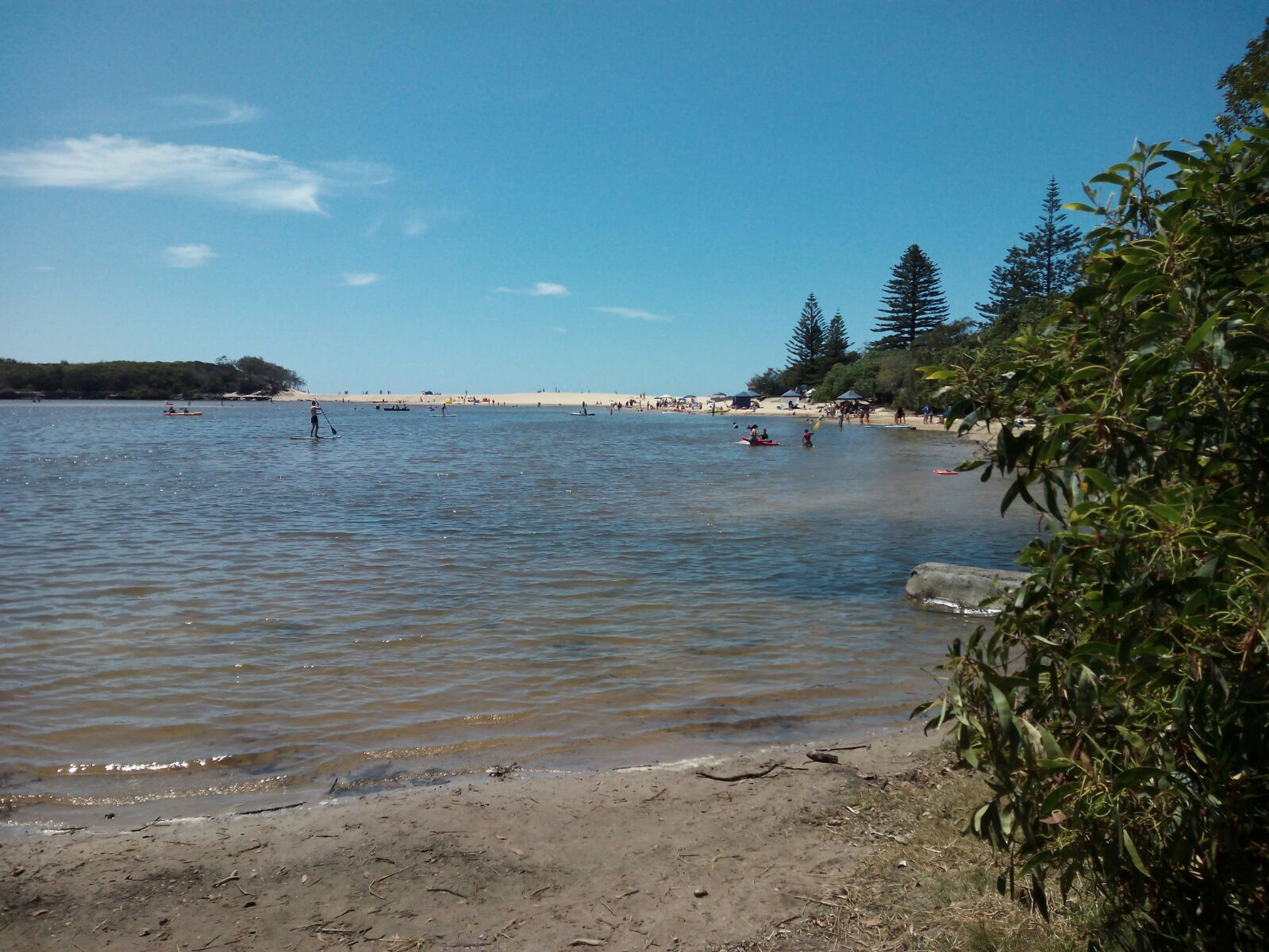
- Lake Currimundi and beach, 2016

- Interactive map of Currimundi
- Coordinates: 26.7658°S 153.1222°E
- Country: Australia
- State: Queensland
- City: Caloundra
- LGA: Sunshine Coast Region
- Location: 5.4 km (3.4 mi) N of Caloundra; 15.8 km (9.8 mi) SSE of Maroochydore; 90.2 km (56.0 mi) NNE of Brisbane

Government
  - State electorate: Kawana
  - Federal division: Fisher

Area
  - Total: 3.6 km^{2} (1.4 sq mi)

Population
  - Total: 6,570 (2021 census)
  - Density: 1,825/km^{2} (4,730/sq mi)
- Time zone: UTC+10:00 (AEST)
- Postcode: 4551
- County: Canning
- Parish: Bribie
Suburbs around Currimundi
Birtinya	Wurtulla	Coral Sea
Meridan Plains	Currimundi	Coral Sea
Little Mountain	Aroona; Battery Hill	Dicky Beach

Currimundi is a coastal suburb of Caloundra in the Sunshine Coast Region, Queensland, Australia. In the 2021 census, Currimundi had a population of 6,570 people.

The area is noted for its diverse environment and is one of Queensland's top five ecotourism destinations.

== Geography ==
Currimundi is located on the northern boundary of the Caloundra area.

Currimundi Lake is a saltwater lake situated beside Currimundi Beach. North of the lake is the Kathleen McArthur Conservation Park. Nicklin Way, the main road between Caloundra and Maroochydore, crosses Ahern Bridge over Currimundi Lake. The Ahern Bridge was named after John Ahern, a firefighter who saved many lives and won a bravery award. Currimundi attracts many tourists in the holidays and the beach is patrolled by Surf Life Saving Australia on weekends and school holidays.

The shopping centre at Currimundi is called the Currimundi Markets.

== History ==
Prior to the colonisation of Australia, Currimundi was the traditional home of the Kabi Kabi peoples.

It was named by Queensland Governor Sir Leslie Wilson, in which he used the local Aboriginal name for the area, Garamandah or Girramundi, meaning "place of flying foxes".

During World War II, Currimundi Lake and the beach areas to its north were used for defence purposes and artillery practice.

== Demographics ==
In the 2016 census, Currimundi had a population of 6,786 people.

In the 2021 census, Currimundi had a population of 6,570 people.

== Education ==
Currimundi State School (opened 24 January 1977) is a government primary (Prep to Year 6) school for boys and girls at 17 Buderim Street (26.7776°S 153.1355°E). In 2018, the school had an enrolment of 579 students with 48 teachers (38 full-time equivalent) and 26 non-teaching staff (17 full-time equivalent). It includes a special education program.

Talara Primary College (opened 22 January 1998) is a government primary (Early Childhood to Year 6) school for boys and girls at Talara Street (26.7724°S 153.1179°E). In 2018, the school had an enrolment of 1,132 students with 79 teachers (69 full-time equivalent) and 47 non-teaching staff (31 full-time equivalent). It includes a special education program.

The nearest government secondary schools are Caloundra State High School, Kawana Waters State College and Meridan State College.

== Environment and ecotourism ==
Currimundi is noted for its natural beauty and is home to the Currimundi Lake (Kathleen McArthur) Conservation Park which is a popular location for bushwalks.

The area has a high degree of biodiversity and includes coastal heath, open forest, woodland, low closed forest with rainforest species, sedgeland and casuarina dune plant communities.

Currimundi Lake is recognised by the Sunshine Coast Region Council as an important coastal asset for both the community and the local wildlife, and so regular maintenance is undertaken in order to protect waterways and manage erosion. Furthermore two local community groups, Currimundi Catchment Care Group Inc and Friends of Currimundi Lake work in cooperation and with the Sunshine Coast Council to improve the Currimundi Catchment and care for the environment.

In 2004 Currimundi won the annual "Queensland's Cleanest Beach" award.

In 2023 Currimundi Lake was identified as one of Queensland's top five 'ecotourism' destinations, having experienced a 325% increase in visitors post the COVID-19 pandemic.

== In popular culture ==
The lake features in a children's book, The Oobleegooblers of Lake Curramundi by Kath Dewhurst, published in 1977, which is based on a local Aboriginal story.
