= Caloundra Christian College =

Independent school in Queensland, Australia

Location
- 7 Gregson Place; Caloundra, Queensland, 4551; Australia

Information
- Type: Independent, co-educational, day school
- Denomination: Christian
- Established: 1983
- Principal: Vince Wakefield
- Grades: Pre-Kindy to Year 12
- Enrolment: ~450
- Houses: Bilyara (Yellow), Matumba (Green), Pinyali (Red)
- Website: calcc.qld.edu.au

Caloundra Christian College is an independent Christian school located in Caloundra on the southern end of Queensland's Sunshine Coast.

The school has a student body of approximately 450 students, from pre-kindy to year 12. The school was established in 1983 and was founded by Caloundra CityLife Baptist Church. It is affiliated with Independent Schools Queensland and Christian Schools Australia.

== History ==
The School was originally started as a non-denominational educational institute, by the founding headmaster Allan Mullaly.

In June, 2013 the school celebrated 30 years of operation. In recent years several new facilities have been built, including:

- the Early Learning Centre located at the entrance of the College
- a new purpose built Primary Learning Centre, with vertical playgrounds
- an Undercover Sports Area, used for sports such as basketball, volleyball, netball and indoor soccer
- new and refurbished Science facilities
- refurbishment of the Home Economics kitchen into a fully functional commercial Hospitality kitchen
- a new three-storey general learning to house the Colleges Middle School students
- a new Tuckshop and Dance Studio, adjacent to the Undercover Sports Area
- a new double-storey 21st Century Library
- multiple undercover links and a new undercover bus bay

== Academic information ==
Caloundra Christian College separates its student body into three parts: Primary School for Prep to Year 6 students, Middle School for students in Years 7, 8 and 9 and Senior School students in Years 10, 11 and 12. In the Senior School, Year 10 students undergo work experience and create "Senior Education and Training Plan", which leads students to set their direction, i.e., choose a career area. Senior students have the opportunity to complete school-based traineeships and complete TAFE level certificates, imbedded in several subjects, including:

- Certificate II Business
- Certificate II Network Administration
- Certificate I Hospitality (Kitchen Operations)

== International Student Program ==
The College takes an active approach to Global Citizenship Education (GCE) by participating in the corresponding Independent Schools Queensland Internationalisation forum , via various entity affiliations on and off shore, and more visibly through inbound and outbound individual or group student placements. In recent years, CCC has partnered with other private, predominantly Christian, SEQ schools to significantly increase the capacity and quality of education export offered. Annually, approximately 600 International school age students from Years 1–12 attend programs run by CCC from between one week to the full academic year.

== Houses ==
The school has three sporting houses which the students are divided into. They are as follows:

- Bilyara (yellow)
- Matumba (green)
- Pinyali (red)

== Music and performance ==
The College has a Secondary choir for students in Years 7 to 12 and a Primary Choir for students in Years 4 to 6. In addition to the choirs, the school also has a band for each sub-school, which plays at Chapel every week and at college events. The College also offers an instrumental music program for students interested in playing instruments such as violin, guitar, bass, piano or drums.

Several performances are undertaken throughout the year, including a Primary School Concert, which is performed by all the students from Prep to Year 6 and also a Year 12 Drama Production.

A group of several previous students also formed a band, called "No Mercy Marg", who won the December 2009 Sunshine Coast Battle of the Bands. The group was named after the Colleges Tuckshop Manager, Margaret Thompson (Margaret has since left the school). The band broke up in 2011.

== Sport ==
The College has a sporting program which allows for all students in the College to compete in an alternate sport every week. Students in Primary and Middle Schools are also required to undertake Health and Physical Education lessons every week. The College has out of school teams in Rugby, Netball and Basketball.

== Discrimination case ==
On 1 May 2012, it was reported that kindergarten teacher Jess Davidson, a teacher at a Sunshine Coast Christian College, claimed that she had been fired for breaking the "lifestyle agreement" part of her contract by having a child out of wedlock. brisbanetimes.com.au obtained a copy of the Lifestyle Agreement and reported that it claimed: "it is a genuine occupational requirement" that nothing in the deliberate conduct of the staff "should be incompatible with the intrinsic character of their position, especially, but not only, in relation to the expression of human sexuality through heterosexual, monogamous relationships, expressed intimately through marriage". Jess has had external advice that she should not talk to media. Former principal of Caloundra Christian College Mark Hodges has stated "These beliefs are set out in College policies and documents, including the agreement under which all staff are employed. This requirement is also made clear to staff prior to appointment".

== See also ==
- List of schools in Queensland
