= Dicky Beach, Queensland =

Dicky Beach
- Suburb
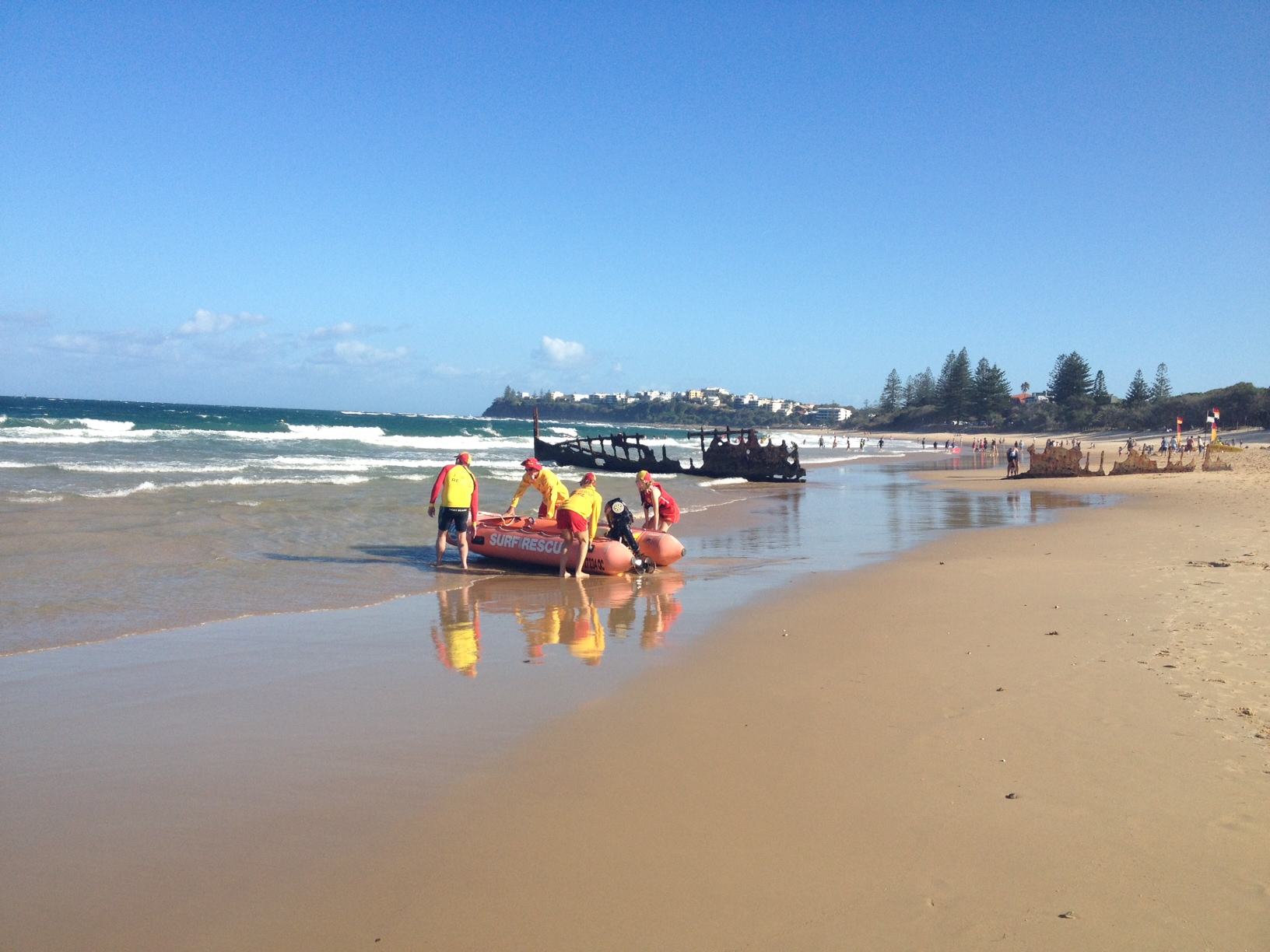
- Dicky Beach

- Interactive map of Dicky Beach
- Coordinates: 26.7838°S 153.1355°E
- Country: Australia
- State: Queensland
- City: Caloundra
- LGA: Sunshine Coast Region
- Location: 2.8 km (1.7 mi) N of Caloundra; 95.6 km (59.4 mi) N of Brisbane

Government
  - State electorate: Caloundra
  - Federal division: Fisher

Area
  - Total: 1.0 km^{2} (0.39 sq mi)

Population
  - Total: 1,921 (2021 census)
  - Density: 1,920/km^{2} (4,980/sq mi)
- Time zone: UTC+10:00 (AEST)
- Postcode: 4551
- County: Canning
- Parish: Bribie
Suburbs around Dicky Beach
Battery Hill	Currimundi	Coral Sea
Battery Hill	Dicky Beach	Coral Sea
Caloundra	Moffat Beach	Coral Sea

Dicky Beach is both a beach and coastal suburb of Caloundra in the Sunshine Coast Region, Queensland, Australia. In the 2021 census, Dicky Beach had a population of 1,921 people.

== Geography ==
The suburb is bounded by the Coral Sea to the east, Buderim Street to the north, Coonowrin Street to the west, and Tooway Creek to the south.

The land use is residential, apart from the caravan park facing the beach (26.7823°S 153.1371°E).

== History ==
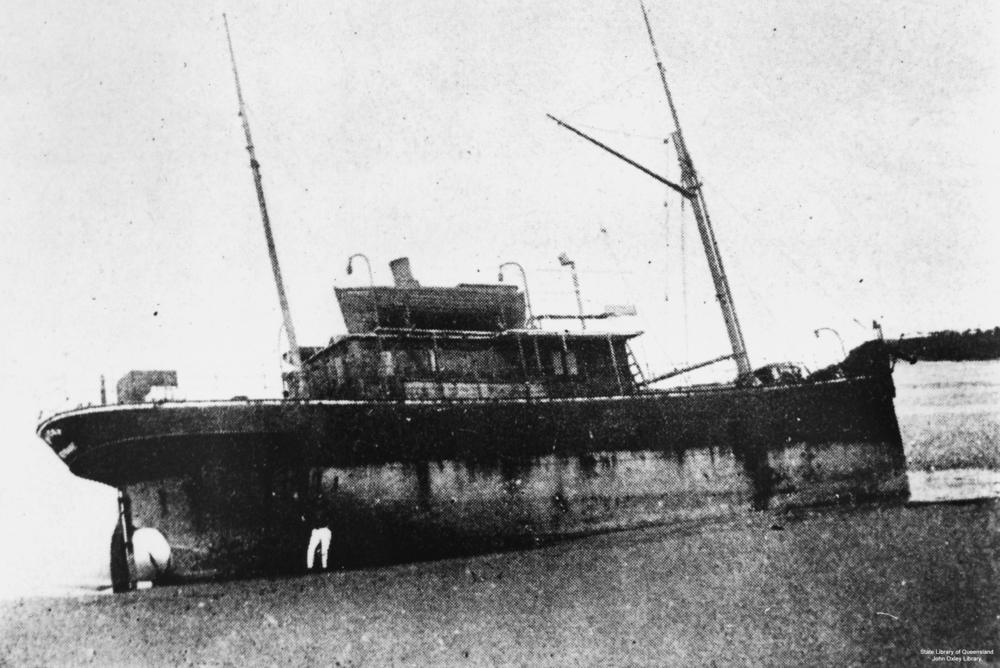
SS Dicky, aground at Caloundra

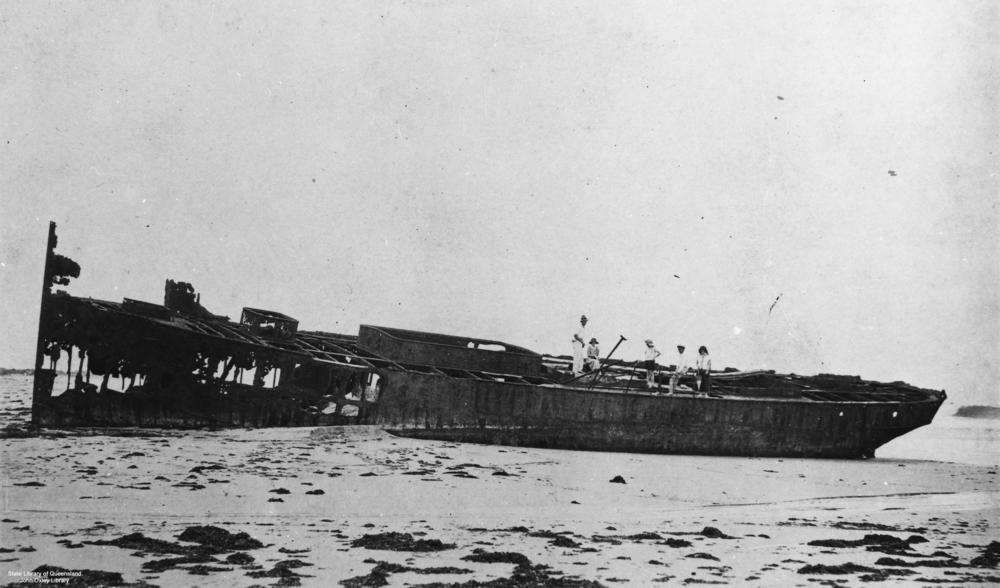
SS Dicky, 1925

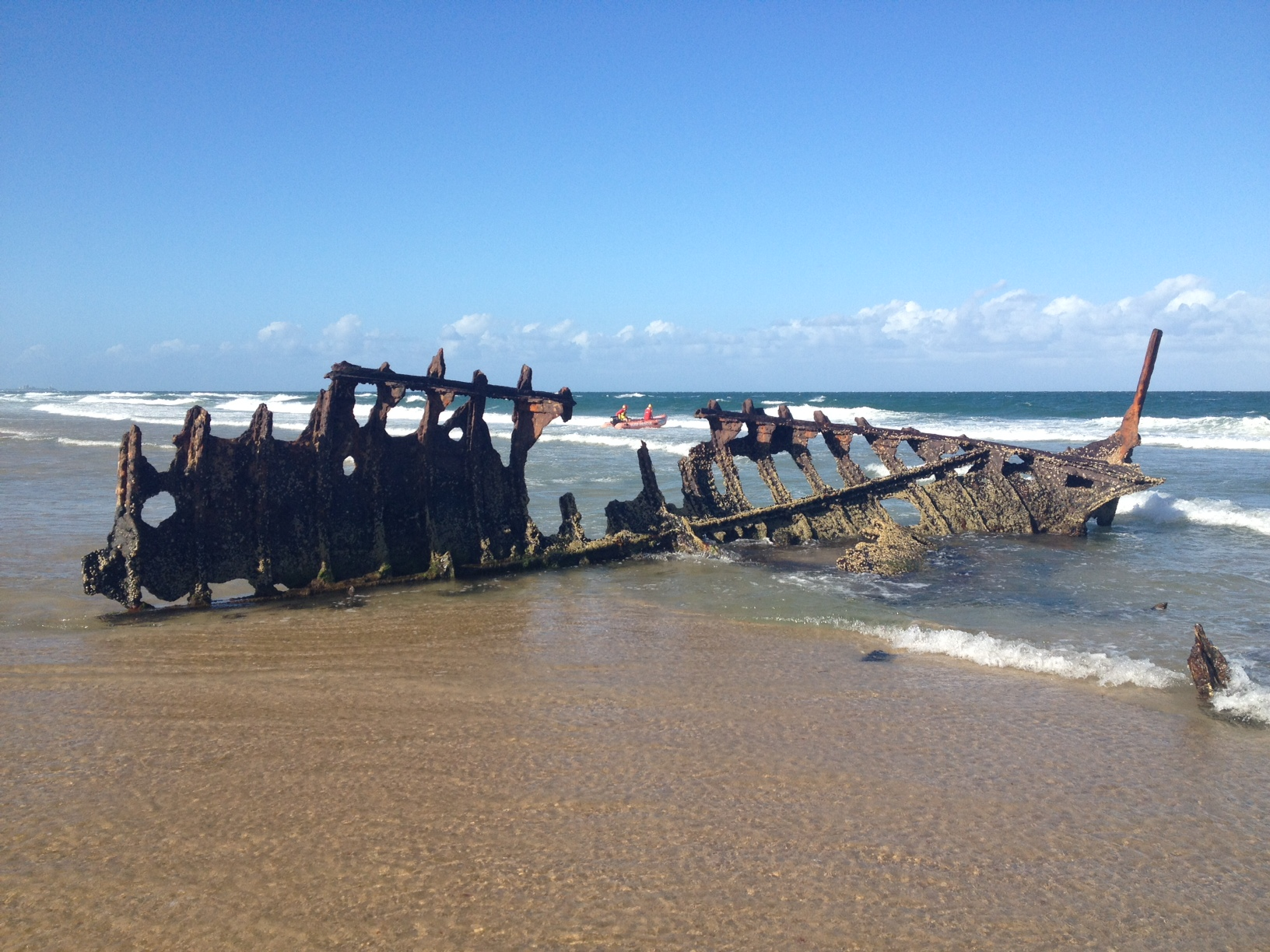
SS Dicky, 2012

The area was named after the iron steamboat, the SS Dicky (226 gross tons), which ran aground during heavy seas on 12 February 1893. It was refloated, but again, heavy seas turned the ship about and back onto the sand where it remained.

The ship was used as a venue for dances until a kerosene lamp overturned and burned out the ship.

In April 1963, the propeller was removed by the Landsborough Shire Council to use on a memorial cairn, accompanied by a plaque provided by the Queensland Women's Historical Association. The opening ceremony was performed by Queensland Premier Frank Nicklin on 24 November 1963.

Currimundi Special School opened on 23 January 1984.

In 2014, the Sunshine Coast Regional Council decided that the deterioration of the Dicky wreck had created a hazard for swimmers due to sharp edges becoming revealed by shifting sand. The decision was taken to relocate the wreck away from the beach. Some deeply buried parts of the wreck will remain on the beach; other parts will be relocated into a foreshore park with an interpretive display, while other parts will be conserved and stored. It is expected that over time more of the wreck will be exposed and will be progressively removed.

== Demographics ==
In the 2011 census, Dicky Beach had a population of 1,758 people with a median age of 48.

In the 2016 census, Dicky Beach had a population of 1,895 people.

In the 2021 census, Dicky Beach had a population of 1,921 people.

== Education ==
Currimundi Special School is a special government primary and secondary (Prep-12) school for boys and girls at Buderim Street (26.7779°S 153.1359°E). In 2018, the school had an enrolment of 215 students with 62 teachers (54 full-time equivalent) and 71 non-teaching staff (43 full-time equivalent).

There are no mainstream schools in Dicky Beach. The nearest government primary school is Currimundi State School in neighbouring Currimundi to the north. The nearest government secondary school is Caloundra State High School in neighbouring Caloundra to the south-west.

== Amenities ==
Dicky Beach is a patrolled beach, and is home to the Dicky Beach Surf Life Saving Club. It has been awarded numerous awards, including the 'DHL Queensland Surf Life Saving Club of the Year' in 2009. There is also a caravan park in the area.
