= Caloundra (suburb) =

- Suburb
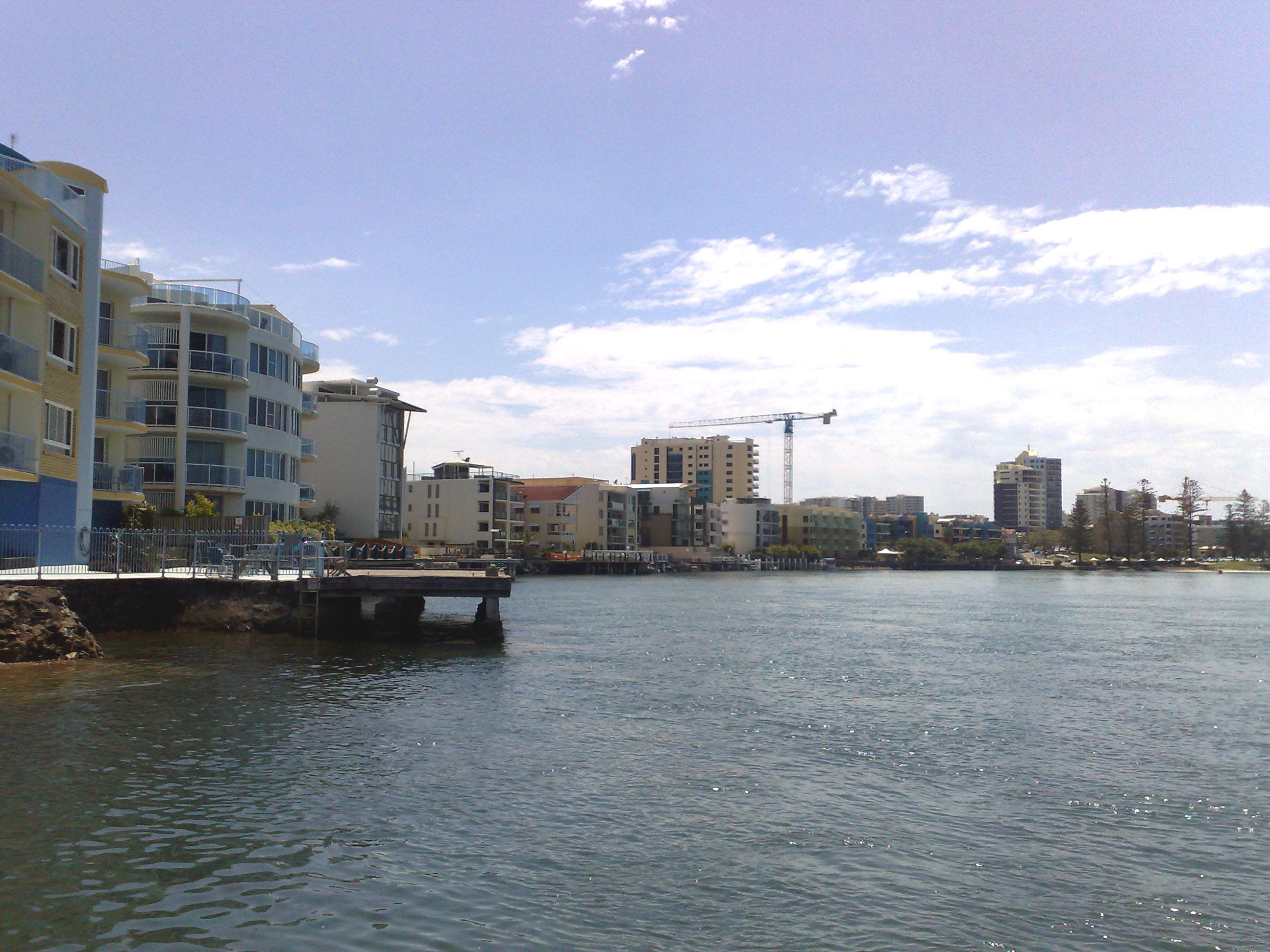
- Caloundra waterfront, 2008

- Interactive map of Caloundra
- Coordinates: 26.7975°S 153.12806°E
- Country: Australia
- State: Queensland
- City: Sunshine Coast
- LGA: Sunshine Coast Region
- Location: 29.4 km (18.3 mi) SSE of Maroochydore; 29.3 km (18.2 mi) SE of Nambour; 94.6 km (58.8 mi) N of Brisbane

Government
  - State electorate: Caloundra
  - Federal division: Fisher

Area
  - Total: 3.2 km^{2} (1.2 sq mi)

Population
  - Total: 3,932 (2021 census)
  - Density: 1,229/km^{2} (3,180/sq mi)
- Time zone: UTC+10:00 (AEST)
- Postcode: 4551
- County: Canning
- Parish: Bribie
Suburbs around Caloundra
Aroona	Battery Hill	Dicky Beach
Caloundra West	Caloundra	Moffat Beach
Golden Beach	Coral Sea	Kings Beach

Caloundra is a coastal suburb and the central business district of the town of Caloundra in the Sunshine Coast Region, Queensland, Australia. In the 2021 census, the suburb of Caloundra had a population of 3,932 people.

== Geography ==
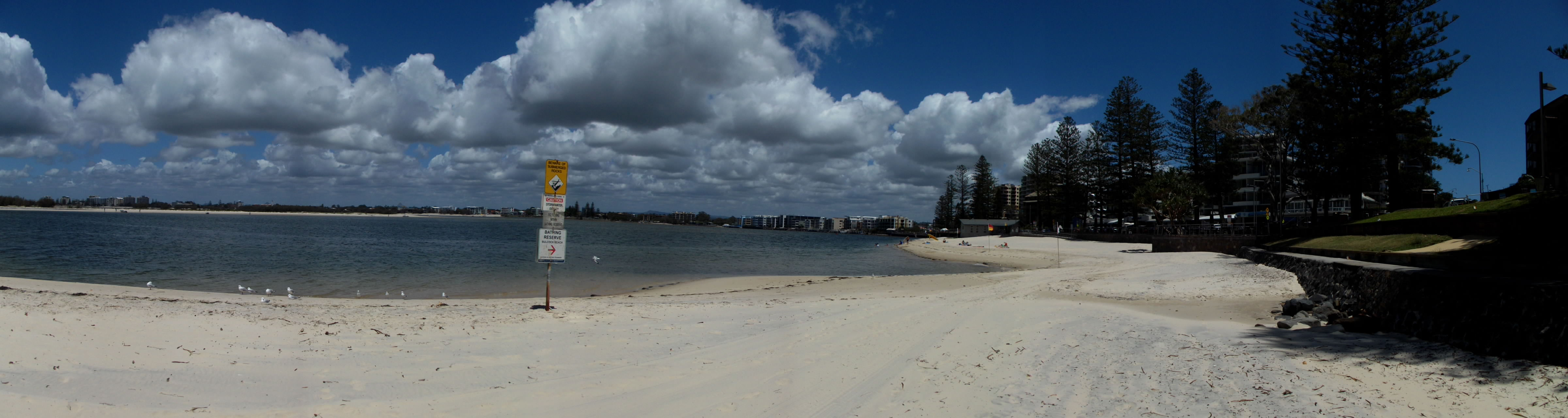
Bulcock Beach, 2012

Bulcock Street is the central business district of the Caloundra urban centre.

In the south of the suburb is a headland (Deep Water Point at 26°48′34″S 153°08′05″E) and a sandy beach (Bulcock Beach at 26°48′25″S 153°07′55″E) which face the Coral Sea with the northern tip of Bribie Island about 200 metres (660 ft) away. Bulcock Beach is named after Robert Bulcock, who served in both the Queensland Legislative Assembly and the Queensland Legislative Council and was a resident of Caloundra in 1878.

== History ==
The suburb takes its name from the headland Caloundra Head (in the neighbouring suburb of Kings Beach), which in turn comes from the Kabi language words "kal/owen" meaning beech tree (Gmelina leichhardtii) and "dha" meaning place.

In 1883 the first allotments of land in Caloundra were advertised for public auction on 28 August 1883. The map states 'the land is of a sandstone nature, undulating and ridgy, heavily timbered with Gum, Bloodwood, Tea-tree and Oak'. A 1907 map shows several sections from George Street to Ernest St advertised for auction on 7 January 1907 by the Government Land Office.

404 allotments of 'Bulcock Estate' were advertised for auction on 16 August 1917 by Isle, Love and Co, auctioneers, with an edge of the Estate mapped as adjacent to Tripcony's store and the Tramway terminus.

In 1919, 29 subdivided allotments of 'Caloundra Heads Estate' were advertised to be auctioned on 20 December 1919 by Cameron Bros. in Brisbane. A map advertising the auction shows the majority of blocks were on Albert Street between King Street and King's Beach. Another undated map shows more blocks of this estate were advertised for auction on King Street towards Ernest Street.

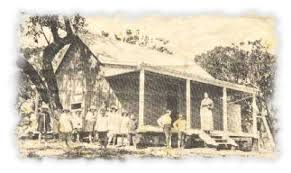
Historic building at Caloundra State School

Caloundra Provisional School opened on 8 March 1899 and became Caloundra State School on 1 June 1912. From 1963 to 1966, it progressively offered secondary schooling on a new site.

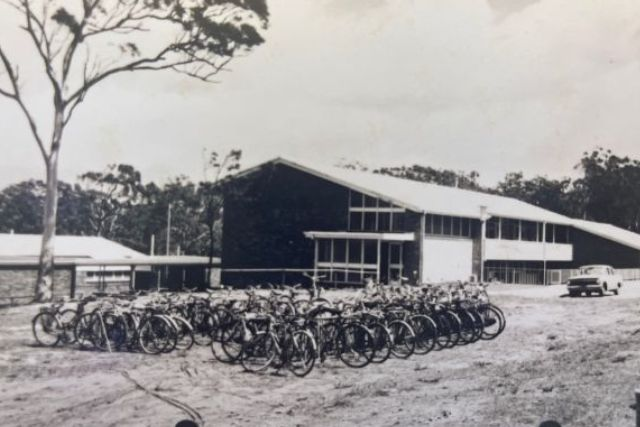
Caloundra State High School buildings, 1967

On 23 January 1967, the new site officially became Caloundra State High School.

Our Lady of the Rosary School opened on 29 January 1980 by the Roman Catholic teaching order, the Sisters of St Joseph of the Sacred Heart.

The Sir Francis Nicklin Memorial Uniting Church was officially opened on Saturday 20 September 1980 by Mike Ahern, the Member of the Queensland Legislative Assembly for Landsborough. It commemorates former Queensland Premier, Frank Nicklin, who was previously the Member for Landsborough.

Caloundra Christian College opened on 2 February 1983 by the Caloundra CityLife Baptist Church, which meets for worship at the college.

== Demographics ==
In the 2016 census, the suburb of Caloundra had a population of 3,917 people.

In the 2021 census, the suburb of Caloundra had a population of 3,932 people.

== Heritage listings ==
The suburb of Caloundra has a number of heritage-listed sites, including:

- Tripcony Hibiscus Caravan Park, Bowman Road (26.8055°S 153.1248°E)

== Education ==
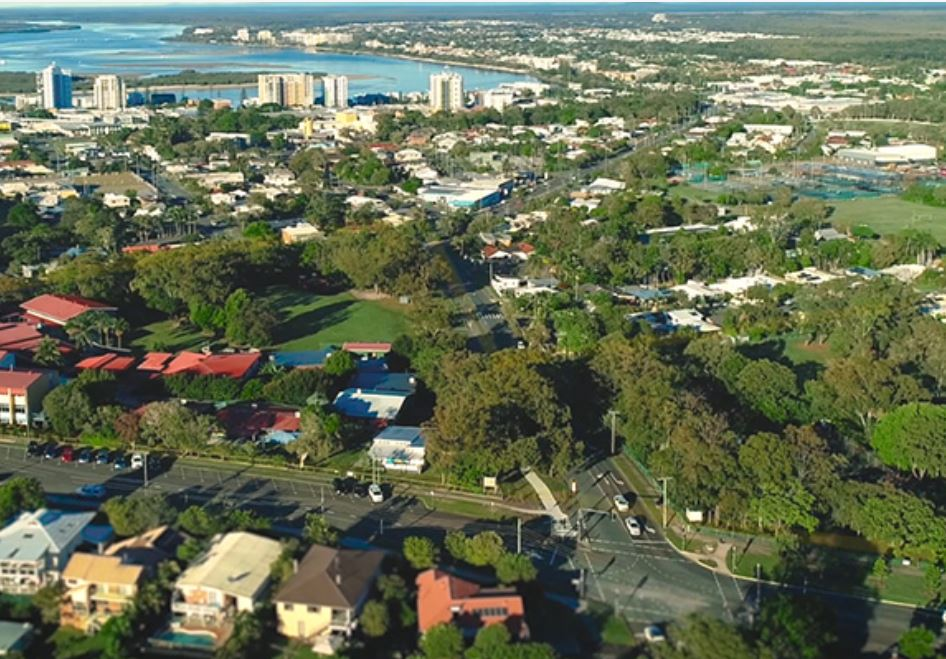
Caloundra State School (left), aerial view of red-roofed school buildings and oval with the Coral Sea in the distance, 2025

Caloundra State School is a government primary (Prep–6) school for boys and girls at 56A Queen Street (26.7971°S 153.1350°E). It includes a special education program. In 2017, the school had an enrolment of 608 students with 45 teachers (36 full-time equivalent) and 25 non-teaching staff (17 full-time equivalent). In 2022, the school had 520 students.

Caloundra Christian College is a private primary and secondary (Prep–12) school for boys and girls at 7 Gregson Place (26.7997°S 153.1184°E). In 2017, the school had an enrolment of 330 students with 31 teachers (27 full-time equivalent) and 25 non-teaching staff (17 full-time equivalent). In 2021, the school had 426 students with 25 full-time teachers and 9 part-time teachers and 11 full-time, 32 part-time and 21 casual, non-teaching staff.

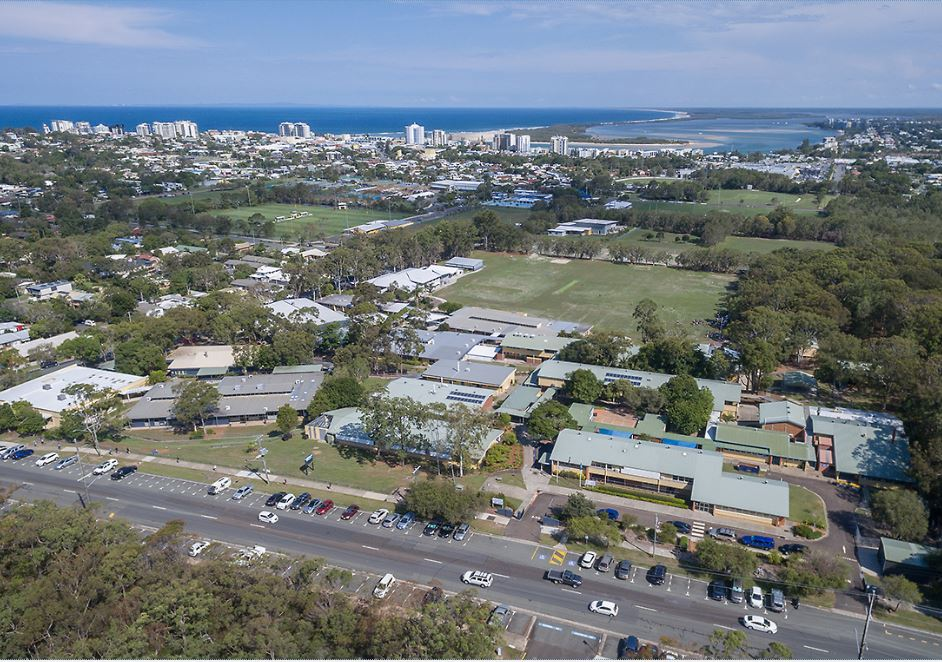
Caloundra State High School, aerial view with Coral Sea in the distance, 2025

Caloundra State High School is a government secondary (7–12) school for boys and girls at 88 Queen Street (26.7938°S 153.1255°E). It includes a special education program. In 2017, the school had an enrolment of 1,209 students with 95 teachers (84 full-time equivalent) and 47 non-teaching staff (33 full-time equivalent). In 2022, the school had 1,422 students with 109 teachers (98 full-time equivalent) and 55 non-teaching staff (41 full-time equivalent).

== Amenities ==
Caloundra Uniting Church is at 56c Queen Street (26.7945°S 153.1312°E). It is also known as the Sir Francis Nicklin Memorial Uniting Church.

== Shopping ==
- Stockland Caloundra
- Caloundra Village Shopping Centre

== Parks and recreation ==
- Ben Bennett Botanical Park
- Bicentennial Park
- Bulcock Beach (patrolled by Ithaca–Caloundra City Life Saving Club) and Clarke Place Park
- Central Park (includes Caloundra Tennis Centre, which hosts the Caloundra International)
- Lighthouse Park
- Roy Henzell Park

== Other facilities ==
- Caloundra Hospital
- Caloundra bus station
- Caloundra Golf Club
- Council service centre for Sunshine Coast Region
- A range of accommodation from backpackers to resort hotels
