= Caloundra Lighthouses =

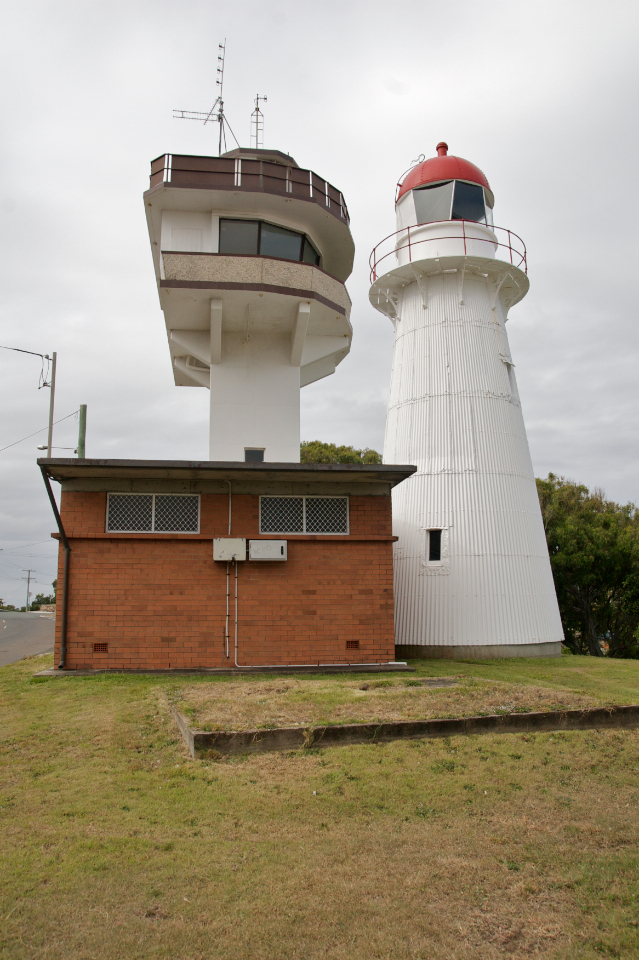
- New and Old Caloundra Lighthouses, 2008

- Location within Queensland
- 26.8014°S 153.1376°E
- Location: 3 Canberra Terrace near Arthur Street, Kings Beach, Caloundra, Sunshine Coast Region, Queensland, Australia

History
- Design period: 1870s–1890s (late 19th century)
- Built: 1896; 1968

Site notes
- Architect: Francis Drummond Greville Stanley

Queensland Heritage Register
- Official name: Caloundra Lighthouses
- Type: state heritage (built)
- Designated: 5 February 2010
- Reference no.: 602746
- Significant period: 1896 onwards
- Significant components: wall/s – retaining, trees/plantings, public park/garden, car park, views from, building foundations/ruins, engine/generator shed/room / power supply, memorial – rock/stone/boulder, radar station, lighthouse/light station

Caloundra Lighthouses are a heritage-listed pair of lighthouses at 3 Canberra Terrace, near Arthur Street, Kings Beach, Caloundra, Sunshine Coast Region, Queensland, Australia. The first, known as the Old Caloundra Light, was designed by Francis Drummond Greville Stanley and built in 1896; the second, New Caloundra Light, was built in 1968. They were added to the Queensland Heritage Register on 5 February 2010.

== History ==
The Caloundra Head Lighthouses played an integral role in Queensland's system of coastal navigation aids from the 1890s to the 1970s and remain prominent landmarks from Moreton Bay and in the Caloundra district. From construction of the first lighthouse in 1896 through to the decommissioning of the second (1968) lighthouse in 1978 the lights on Caloundra Head guided mariners to the northern entrance to the North West Channel – the safest, most reliable and consequently the most used entry channel to the Port of Brisbane. Despite no longer operating as lighthouses, community support for the conservation of both structures has ensured their survival, while the image of the 1896 lighthouse, Caloundra's oldest surviving structure, has endured as one of the most significant symbols of the town.

=== Background ===
When Queensland separated from New South Wales in 1859 the new colony had only one lightstation: Cape Moreton Light on Moreton Island, which had a stone lighthouse erected in 1856. (The Raine Island Beacon constructed in 1844 by the British navy was no longer in use.) This situation was untenable for a colony that relied heavily on coastal shipping. In the 1860s and 1870s the expansion of pastoral and mining activity in northern Queensland led to the establishment of new coastal ports to service the developing hinterlands and the provision of coastal navigation aids became essential.

In 1864 the Queensland Government appointed a select committee to investigate the state of harbours and rivers in the colony. A direct outcome of this inquiry was the construction of the Bustard Head Light south-east of Gladstone in 1867–68 and a lighthouse at Sandy Cape in 1870 – the first lighthouses built by the Queensland colonial government. These were prefabricated iron-framed structures with bolted or riveted cast-iron plate cladding and internal iron staircases, the whole imported from England.

By 1873, the year of the inaugural Intercolonial Coast Lighthouse Conference in Sydney, Queensland had 39 lights along its coastline. The conference was the first attempt to coordinate coastal lights and signals around Australia. Recommendations included the need for more coastal lights in Queensland. Although there was general agreement on the recommendations, there were no moves by any of the colonies to cede their control of lighthouses and other coastal signals to a centralised body or to adopt standardised designs for coastal lights. Lighthouse design continued to take into account local conditions and readily available building materials. Often the local materials were augmented with specialised fittings such as stairways, lantern rooms, lenses, and clock work mechanisms from overseas companies.

For the third lighthouse built by the Queensland colonial government (Lady Elliot Island Light erected on Lady Elliott's Island in 1872–73), Colonial Architect FDG Stanley designed a structure which utilised readily available local timber, specifying a hardwood frame clad with plated iron sheeting. This reduced the cost of construction, and despite problems of termite infestation and rusting, this type of construction, or its derivative, a wooden frame with corrugated galvanised iron sheeting, became the standard for subsequent nineteenth century Queensland lighthouses. Between 1873 and 1901, 14 lighthouses were constructed in Queensland using hardwood framing and plated iron sheeting, and another 7 were constructed with hardwood frames and corrugated iron cladding. The latter were associated mostly with harbour entrances and included: Little Sea Hill Light (1876 – relocated); Grassy Hill Light (1886 – active); Goods Island Light (1886 – active); Bay Rock Light (1886 – inactive – relocated); Caloundra Head Light (1896 – inactive); North Point Hummock Light (1899 – demolished); Gatcombe Head Light (1900 – demolished). An eighth lighthouse of this type, Bulwer Island Light, was constructed at Bulwer Island in the Brisbane River in 1912, but is now inactive has been relocated.

From 1846, when declared a port of entry, Brisbane/Moreton Bay had been the principal port of Queensland. By the late 1850s the main northern channel lay about half a nautical mile west of Moreton Island and was marked by Cape Moreton Light, the lightship Rose, and covered lights: Comboyuro Point Light, North Point Light and Cowan Cowan Light. In 1879 George Poynter Heath, Portmaster of Queensland from 1862 to 1890 and Chairman of the Queensland Marine Board from 1869 to 1890, sounded a new channel from Caloundra Head along the eastern shore of Bribie Island to provide a deep water entry to the Port of Brisbane. This North West Channel quickly proved to be the safest and most reliable deep water entrance to the port, but remained unlit until 1896 when two leading lights on Bribie Island and at Caloundra Head (marking the entrance to the channel), were completed.

=== Old Caloundra Lighthouse ===
A 25 acres (10 ha) Lighthouse Reserve had been proclaimed when the town of Caloundra was surveyed in 1883 but was never used. Instead, in the mid-1890s a site of little over 0.5 acres (0.20 ha) was chosen on land owned by Robert Bulcock, where he had built an observation platform on the highest portion of his property during the early 1880s, reputedly to keep watch for enemy ships during the "Russian Scare". Early photographs show that the first Caloundra Head Light was built close to Bulcock's observation platform, which stood to the south-west on what is now Canberra Terrace.

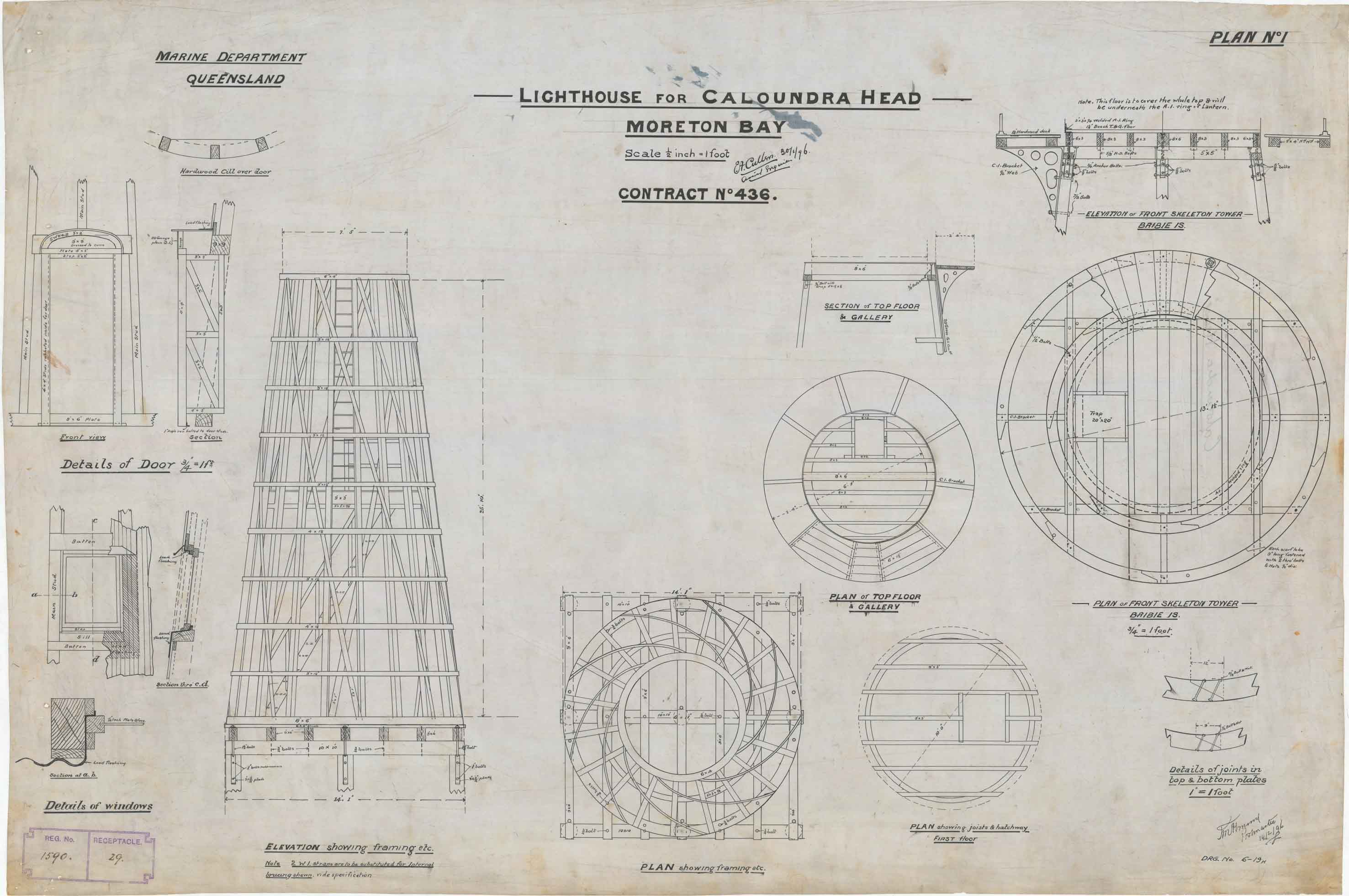
Old Caloundra Head Light plans, 1896

The lighthouse reserve was formally transferred to the Crown in 1896–97 and early in 1896 the Department of Harbours and Rivers called tenders for the construction of two lighthouse towers and cottages on Bribie Island and a lighthouse tower and cottage at Caloundra Head. Materials were shipped by barge from Brisbane and department officers supervised the erection of the lightstations using day labour. The Caloundra Head Lighthouse was a hardwood-framed structure, clad with corrugated iron. A fourth order dioptric apparatus, which operated by concentrating light by refraction, was imported from Chance Bros & Co near Birmingham. The towers for the two leading lights on Bribie Island were of a much simpler construction: open timber frames that could be moved as the channel changed.

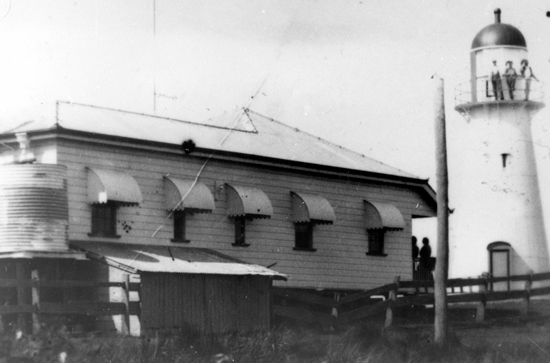
Caloundra Lighthouse and Keeper's residence, circa 1920

The first light keeper at the Caloundra Head Lightstation was appointed when the light became operational in September 1896. One room of his cottage functioned as a postal receiving office, complete with telegraph facilities, with the light keeper appointed as the receiving office keeper. In 1910 the telegraph service was discontinued but was replaced by a telephone service in 1912. The post office remained at the lighthouse until 1934 and as a result, a rough track along the ridge was created by a steady stream of local residents, helping to foster closer settlement around the lighthouse in the immediate years after its erection. This rough track eventually became Canberra Terrace. As a married man with a large family, the arrival of the first lightkeeper also led to the establishment of the first Caloundra School, which for several months in the late 1890s was conducted at the light keeper's cottage.

An incandescent vapour light, the first of its kind in Queensland, was purchased from Chance Brothers and installed in 1910 and by 1912 its 1400 candle power was visible at least 22–25 miles (35–40 km) out to sea. Many mariners considered it the best light on the Queensland coast and the key to successfully traversing Moreton Bay. As a result, by 1920 all vessels entering and leaving the Port of Brisbane at night had to use the North West Channel.

Following the passage of the 1912 Commonwealth Navigation Act, from 1 July 1915 Queensland handed over responsibility for its 30 staffed lights and 37 unattended lights, beacons, and buoys to the Australian Government, who constructed additional lightstations and made substantial upgrades to existing lights, with many lighthouses converted to unattended acetylene lights. The bulk of the expenditure was concentrated north of Cooktown where seven new lighthouses were constructed to guide ships through the Torres Strait and the Great Barrier Reef. Staffed lighthouses were phased out in favour of less expensive, utilitarian-designed structures that did not need to be staffed.

Caloundra Head Lighthouse continued to signal the entrance to the North West Channel to the Port of Brisbane and by 1929 investment in new navigation marks and dredging to increase the depth of the channel ensured that most of the larger ships entering Brisbane used this channel.

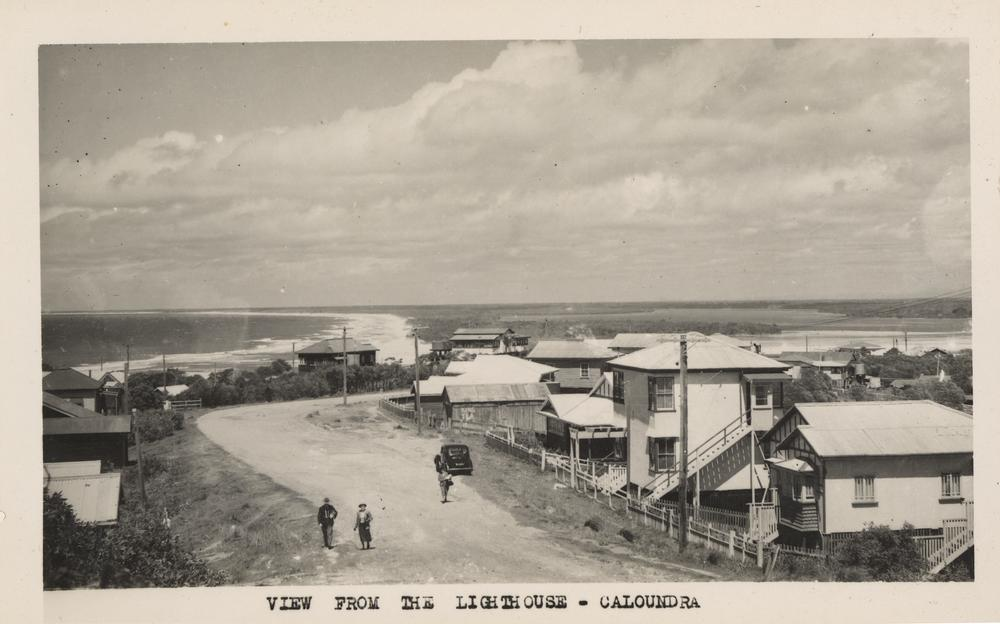
View from the Old Light, 1952

The lighthouse also played an important role in the development of tourism on the North Coast (now Sunshine Coast). From as early as the 1880s holiday makers were travelling to Caloundra by boat or by rail to Landsborough then overland to Caloundra and staying in one of the early guesthouses or camping grounds. "Lighthouse Hill" became well known as a lookout and beauty spot, a place to which tourists and visiting dignitaries alike were taken to see the view, and take a photograph from Bulcock's observation platform (which still existed in the early 1900s). The image of the lighthouse became a symbol of Caloundra, used on promotional material, estate maps, tourist brochures and postcards. With the improvement of roads in the 1930s, Caloundra became more popular as a tourist destination and underwent a period of rapid expansion.

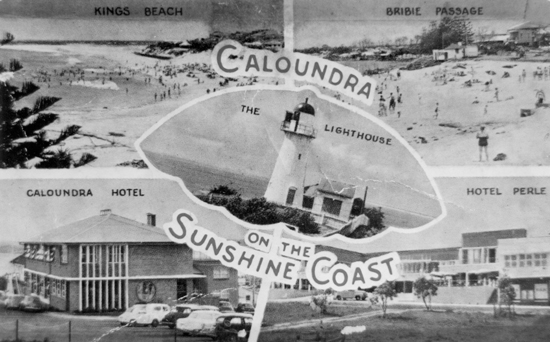
The lighthouse as a tourist attraction, circa 1950

With the advent of hostilities in south-east Asia and the Pacific in 1940 during World War II the operation of all Australian coastal lights was controlled by the Royal Australian Navy. With Brisbane becoming a major disembarkation point for soldiers and supplies for the war effort, the North West Channel through Moreton Bay became the only entrance to the Port making it a well used and vital route. For security purposes ships entering and leaving the channel had to travel in convoys and it was a common sight to see a host of vessels waiting off Caloundra Head to form a convoy before continuing to the Port of Brisbane or their next destination. For security purposes the channel was moved further east, away from the Bribie Island coast.

For the greater part of World War II the Royal Australian Navy set up an observation post within the grounds of the Caloundra Head Lighthouse reserve. Twenty-four hour watches were kept, and display of the light to shipping was controlled. The light was converted to 240 volt mains power in 1942 and a petrol standby engine was added. The lighthouse no longer needed to be staffed, so the Coastal Artillery occupied the lightkeeper's cottage and oversaw the operation of the light.

After the war the Caloundra Head Lighthouse remained unstaffed. The lightkeeper's cottage, no longer needed, was sold to a private owner and moved down the hill to Upper Gay Terrace in 1946 (this building was extant in 2009, but greatly modified). Canberra Terrace was widened and underwent a number of improvements, and by 1950 the unused northern portion of the lighthouse reserve had been opened as a public park, with the area around the lighthouse fenced off. The lighthouse image continued to be used on tourist brochures, pamphlets and postcards. Caloundra Primary School (and later the High School) adopted the lighthouse as its school crest with the motto "Giving Light". Various clubs and societies, such as the Caloundra Bowls Club, also adopted stylised versions of the lighthouse in their logos.

In 1950 the North West Channel was still the most used entrance to the Port of Brisbane. During the 1960s change and development in Australian industry and trade had a marked influence on the shipping industry. With the advent of road and rail transportation many of the smaller coastal ships became obsolete but the increase in large container ships meant that passages such as Moreton Bay's deep North West Channel became even more important.

=== New Caloundra Lighthouse ===
In May 1966 the Australian Government, responding to the changing nature of international shipping, granted permission for the Queensland Government to construct a composite structure comprising lighthouse, signal station and radar station, on the lighthouse reserve at Caloundra Head. The new structure was part of a pilot station scheme based at the Mooloolah River, and was to serve as a guide to the North West Channel and a signal light for Caloundra Harbour. Fully completed and operational by 1968, the new lighthouse was erected close to the 1896 lighthouse and for a time the two towers stood side by side. Constructed in reinforced concrete, the new lighthouse resembled an airport control tower. A new light that used a revolving table and comprised two stacks of sealed beam lamps was designed and installed. It was staffed 24 hours a day and four houses were built outside the reserve to accommodate the staff and their families. A similar signal station tower was constructed at Lytton Hill, making the Caloundra tower one of only two of this type built in Australia. With the Lytton Hill tower being demolished in the 1990s, the Caloundra tower remains the only surviving example.

In Queensland, the Australian Government constructed seven concrete lighthouses between 1964 and 1979: Cape Capricorn Light (1964); Caloundra Head (1968); Point Danger Light (New South Wales, 1971); New Burnett Heads Light (1971); Fitzroy Island Light (1973); Point Cartwright Light (1978); and Archer Point Light (1979). In the 1980s, as lights became unstaffed and automatic, the emphasis shifted to less expensive structures with shorter lifespans.

The new light at Caloundra Head had a relatively short working life, with nearby high-rise residential unit development obscuring views of the light from sea and rendering it ineffective. Downgraded, the 1968 light was transferred on a reduced area of land (868 square metres (9,340 sq ft)) to the Queensland Treasury in 1974 and it continued to operate as a harbour light and signal station. A new tower, Point Cartwright Light, constructed at the mouth of the Mooloola River at Point Cartwright in 1978 took over the role of lighting the North West Channel. In 1992 the function of the Caloundra Signal Station was replaced by an automatic radar/microwave link unit on the roof of units at Wickham Point to the east, resulting in the station being de-staffed. In the late 1990s the light was replaced by a beacon on Wickham Point. Some radio equipment was left in operation at the Caloundra Signal Station, which is still used by local emergency services.

=== Survival of the Old Caloundra Lighthouse ===
Upon completion of the new lighthouse and signal station in 1968, the 1896 Caloundra Head Lighthouse had been threatened with demolition. To save the structure it was moved in 1970 by the Golden Beach Power Boat Club to Woorim Park, adjacent to their new clubhouse site, where it was hoped it could continue as a tourist attraction. Some attempts were made to conserve the exterior, but, over the decades, continued deterioration and lack of a viable use for the structure meant that its future was threatened again. Several options for relocating the lighthouse were put forward, however the closure of the Caloundra Signal Station in 1992 meant that the option of returning the 1896 lighthouse to its original position on Canberra Terrace became a possibility. After years of lobbying, especially by the Lions Club of Caloundra, and a $50,000 grant from the Caloundra City Council, an attempt to re-locate the lighthouse on 22 March 1999 saw the timber frame give way when the lighthouse was being positioned on a truck. After repairs, the lighthouse was successfully re-positioned on its original site in Canberra Terrace on 11 June 1999. The tower and lantern were restored, including strengthening of the timber structure, replacement and repairs to the cladding, repair of the lantern roof and repainting of the exterior. In late 2007 the Friends of the Caloundra Lighthouses was formed to assist in the conservation of both lights, which were leased to the Sunshine Coast Regional Council in 2010.

== Description ==
At the highest point of the coastal town of Caloundra, located approximately 80 kilometres (50 mi) north-east of Brisbane at the northern end of Pumicestone Passage, the two former Caloundra lighthouses stand side by side in a small park. Located close to the heart of town and behind Kings Beach, the site is now surrounded by suburban and medium-rise development, yet maintains extensive views over the city of Caloundra to the ocean, Moreton Island, Pumicestone Passage and the Glasshouse Mountains. The views obtained from the top of both lighthouses are even more extensive, with glimpses of Point Cartwright possible from the top level of the Signal Station. The two lighthouses are clearly visible from many vantage points around Caloundra, particularly in the vicinity of Kings Beach.

The rectangular-shaped site, as encompassed by the heritage boundary and corresponding almost exactly with the 1896 extent of the lighthouse reserve, covers an area of 868 square metres and is orientated north–south. It is divided into two lots – the present day (2009) Lighthouse Reserve at the southern end (1/RP135230) and Lions Park at the northern end (2/RP135230). The western boundary is defined by Canberra Terrace, which leads down into the main commercial spine of Caloundra, Bulcock Street. The northern boundary is made by Arthur Street, a long straight road descending steeply from the intersection with Canberra Terrace at the north-western corner of the park. Single residences occupy the allotments to the east of the site, while a number of medium-rise residential unit blocks have been built from the adjacent property to the south down Canberra Terrace.

=== Lighthouse reserve ===
The Lighthouse Reserve (1/RP135230) is an open grassed area, sloping down to the east and south. It contains the 1896 lighthouse (currently known as the Old Caloundra Head Lighthouse), 1968 lighthouse and signal station (currently known as the Caloundra Signal Station) and a c. 1968 brick generator shed, all clustered together near the Canberra Terrace boundary. A concrete slab from a previous auxiliaries building and some concrete footings (possibly from the original signals mast) are also located within the allotment.

==== 1896 Lighthouse ====
The 1896 lighthouse is a timber-framed structure clad in corrugated iron, standing twelve metres high and capped with a domed lantern. The tower is conical in form with a base diameter of approximately 4.3 metres (14 ft) reducing to a top diameter of 2.26 metres (7 ft 5 in). It has been reinstalled at its original location on a round concrete slab placed over the top of the original 1896 footing when it was returned from Golden Beach in 1999. Corrugations in the iron sheeting taper inwards for the full height of the tower. Most exterior sheeting is early, slip-sheeted in places with zinc sheeting to repair rusted sections. A small timber-framed entry projects from the northern side, clad in corrugated iron with an arched corrugated iron roof. The door is made from tongue and groove boards on a timber frame. Four small, rectangular windows provide daylight to the interior – two at ground level and two corresponding to the level of the central interior platform. They are vertical sliders, framed with cedar and weather-proofed on the exterior by lead flashing. The exterior of the tower is painted white, with the exception of a red border on the entry door.

Inside there are two platforms above ground level, accessed by near-vertical timber steps and hatchways in the floors. The tower framework features original components, including: 140-by-100-millimetre (5.5 in × 3.9 in) timber stud work; circular girts made from beech; a combination of diagonal timber bracing and steel spiral strapping; timber floor joists on each level supported on a circular steel angle; and floors lined with wide tongue and groove boards. A small number of timber components were replaced after the 1999 move when the tower was damaged, and some steel bracket work was installed. The steel, angled bottom plate and tie-down brackets bolting the structure to the slab also date from c. 1999, with some original brackets remaining as examples. Some early timber shelving remains, as well as some of the 1940s electrical conduit, wiring and switches (no longer in use). Signage and a safety strap on the top ladder have been introduced since restoration of the structure in 1999.

The lantern room with hemispherical dome roof sits on top of the tower and is accessed via a hatchway in the floor which is lined with lead. All optics have been removed from the lantern, but a pedestal similar to the original has been recently installed. The cylindrical lantern base is constructed from 4.5-millimetre (0.18 in) thick steel plates, with a hatch door on the northern side to allow access to the exterior gallery. Its middle section consists of eight trapezoidal frames, five of which are glazed. The remaining three frames (on the western side) are filled with galvanized sheeting with diagonal bracing. The dome is made from eight steel segments bolted together with additional bar stiffeners. It is painted red on the exterior and topped with a ventilator cowl. The narrow gallery that encircles the lantern has a hardwood timber floor supported by cast iron brackets, and a lightweight tubular balustrade, also painted red.

==== 1968 Lighthouse and signal station ====
The 1968 signal station stands approximately four metres to the north-west of the 1896 lighthouse. It consists of a square concrete tower supporting a multi-faceted, D-shaped observation room with a lantern mounted on the roof. The overall height of the structure is approximately 14 metres (46 ft) and the rounded side of the observation room faces east. The tower base measures 2.7 square metres (29 sq ft) and features a rectangular window on each face (at various heights in line with the internal staircase). Angled, reinforced concrete beams cantilever out from the tower base and support the overhanging concrete floor slab of the observation room and its balcony. The observation room features a continuous band of windows around its eastern sides, while four individual windows pierce the straight concrete western wall.

From the ground level entrance door on the western side of the tower, a spiral concrete staircase with steel tubular handrail winds around a central service duct before arriving in the near-centre of the observation room. Apart from an enclosed toilet in the north-west corner, the observation room is an open space with a central pillar that contains cavities for services that link to the roof level. Fixed angled glazing wraps around the north, east and south sides. A set of recent laminated cabinetry sits below the observation windows along the north-east. Original metal window frames on the western wall are a mixture of midpoint pivoting and fixed panes, while more recent aluminium-framed windows are found in the toilet. Floors are lined with linoleum and a system of suspended ceiling panels conceals the underside of the concrete roof slab. A recent sink and cupboard sits up against the southern wall of the toilet. All original communications equipment has been removed. Access to the external balcony, which wraps around all sides except the straight, western edge, is through a single door in the south-west corner. This timber door retains the original separate screen door. The narrow balcony has a concrete floor and a balustrade made from two tubular steel rails and widely separated balusters covered in asbestos cement sheeting rendered with pebble-dash on the exterior face. The steel balusters pierce the concrete floor slab and are fixed on the underside.

At the far north-west end of the balcony is a steel ladder with safety grille, which provides access to the flat concrete roof of the observation room. A waist-height, tubular metal balustrade, with fibre cement panels attached, runs around the edge of this area, with the lantern that once housed the 1968 sealed beam array light located in the centre. Constructed from concrete with a flat concrete roof, the lantern is a multi-faceted, circular room, narrower at the base than the roof and glazed around the eastern half of its circumference. The trapezoidal window panes are fixed within a steel frame and a door on the south–west side allows access inside. A metal ladder on the north–west side provides access to the roof of the lantern, where radar equipment and aerials are mounted.

==== c. 1968 generator shed ====
The former generator shed (c. 1968) is a single-storeyed, orange brick building located close to both lighthouses (south of the concrete signal station and east of the old lighthouse). Entrance to the building is through a roller door on the northern facade. The flat concrete roof overhangs on the north and south sides to form a narrow awning, and a projecting brick sill runs around the building beneath high windows. The interior contains two rooms: a larger room housing a generator, remnant equipment and a workbench; and a smaller room in the north–west corner, accessed by an internal door.

=== Lions Park ===
The main feature of Lions Park is a series of long terraces, formed by boulder walls and garden beds that descend the steep slope falling from Canberra Terrace. A number of trees are planted throughout this area, including wind-stunted endemic Eucalypt species and Grevillea robusta. Along the Canberra Terrace boundary is a small car park with a garden bed at the southern end. A sandstone block in this garden displays a plaque containing historical information about the lighthouses. To the east of the garden bed is a boulder set in a round concrete footing with a memorial plaque dedicated to World War II servicemen attached (erected 1991). With the exception of the memorial, none of the remainder of these elements is considered to be of state-level cultural heritage significance. It is the extent of the largely undeveloped site (part of the original lighthouse reserve) that is significant, rather than the elements that comprise the park.

== Heritage listing ==
Caloundra Lighthouses was listed on the Queensland Heritage Register on 5 February 2010 having satisfied the following criteria.

The place is important in demonstrating the evolution or pattern of Queensland's history.

In their location, materials and design, the Caloundra Lighthouses (constructed in 1896 and 1968) are important in demonstrating aspects of the evolution of marine navigation along the Queensland coast. The first Caloundra Head Lighthouse (1896) marked the entrance to the North West Channel in Moreton Bay, which proved to be the safest, most reliable and consequently the most used entry channel to the Port of Brisbane, Queensland's premier port since the 1840s. It played an important role in Queensland marine navigation for over 70 years. The second lighthouse (1868) marked the entrance to the main channel for only a decade, but remains important in illustrating the evolution of lighthouse form and function in Queensland. The surrounds correspond to the 1896–1974 lighthouse reserve.

The 1896 lighthouse at Caloundra Head is important for its association with the development of Caloundra as a coastal settlement and early tourist destination.

The place is important in demonstrating the principal characteristics of a particular class of cultural places.

The 1896 lighthouse structure remains substantially intact, and is important in illustrating the principal characteristics of a type of lighthouse construction – a conical, timber-framed tower clad with corrugated iron – unique to Queensland. Less than a dozen of this specific type of lighthouse were constructed in Queensland in the last quarter of the nineteenth century and early twentieth century. Two of these have been demolished; three have been relocated and are no longer active; one remains in situ but is no longer active (Caloundra Head (1896) which, although removed from the site in 1970, was returned to its original location in 1999); and two are known to remain active and in situ: Grassy Hill (1886, Grassy Hill Light) at Cooktown and Goods Island (1886) in the Torres Strait.

The 1968 lighthouse and signal station is one of only two constructed to this design in Australia, the only one to survive, and one of a small number of concrete lighthouses built in Queensland. In the combination of lighthouse, signals and radar functions in the one structure, the 1968 lighthouse and its ancillary generator shed are important in demonstrating the range of lightstation structures designed for particular locations.

Together, the two lighthouses on Caloundra Head, which are both substantially intact examples of their type, demonstrate the evolution of lighthouse design in Queensland between the 1890s and 1970s, offering an opportunity for side-by-side comparison.

The lighthouse surrounds (reserve and public park) correspond to the 1896–1974 lighthouse reserve, and demonstrate the area needed for a staffed lightstation.

The place is important because of its aesthetic significance.

The Caloundra Lighthouses on their hilltop setting remain a physical and aesthetic marker of Caloundra.

The place has a strong or special association with a particular community or cultural group for social, cultural or spiritual reasons.

The 1896 Caloundra Head lighthouse has a strong association for generations of tourists who have visited Caloundra, as a symbol of the town and a vantage point from which to survey the coast and hinterland. Located on a prominent site in a town that developed largely due to tourism, the old lighthouse on the hill was one of the most visited and most photographed early tourist attractions in Caloundra.

The 1896 lighthouse also has strong social significance for Sunshine Coast residents. As the only town on the Sunshine Coast to possess a lighthouse, it was a source of pride for the community and helped to distinguish Caloundra from other coastal settlements. Both the symbolic and functional nature of the 1896 lighthouse contributed to Caloundra's sense of identity as a popular seaside resort with a role in navigating the North West Channel into Brisbane. The symbolic nature of the lighthouse is evidenced by its depiction on tourist brochures, logos and crests throughout the twentieth century.

== See also ==
- List of lighthouses in Australia
