= North Point Hummock Light =

Demolished lighthouse in Queensland, Australia

Coordinates: 27.02297°S 153.454483°E

North Point Light, also known as North Point Hummock Light, was located on North Point, the most northern point on Moreton Island. North Point Light was constructed in the early 1860s, carrying a large kerosene burner with a reflector.

In 1899, the lighthouse was replaced with a hardwood timber-framed structure, clad with corrugated iron. It was the sixth of a group of eight lighthouses in Queensland constructed this way, including, by order of establishment, Little Sea Hill Light, Grassy Hill Light, Goods Island Light, Bay Rock Light, Old Caloundra Light, itself, Gatcombe Head Light and Bulwer Island Light.

Oddly, a 1909 listing still describes the light as a square wooden lightroom, carrying a fixed sixth order dioptric apparatus. The light shown is described as a white sector, visible for 7 nautical miles (13 km; 8.1 mi).

In 1912 the lighthouse was transferred to the control of the Commonwealth. It was later demolished. The 2010 List of Lights does not list a light at the location.
