= Bay Rock Light =

Lighthouse in Queensland, Australia

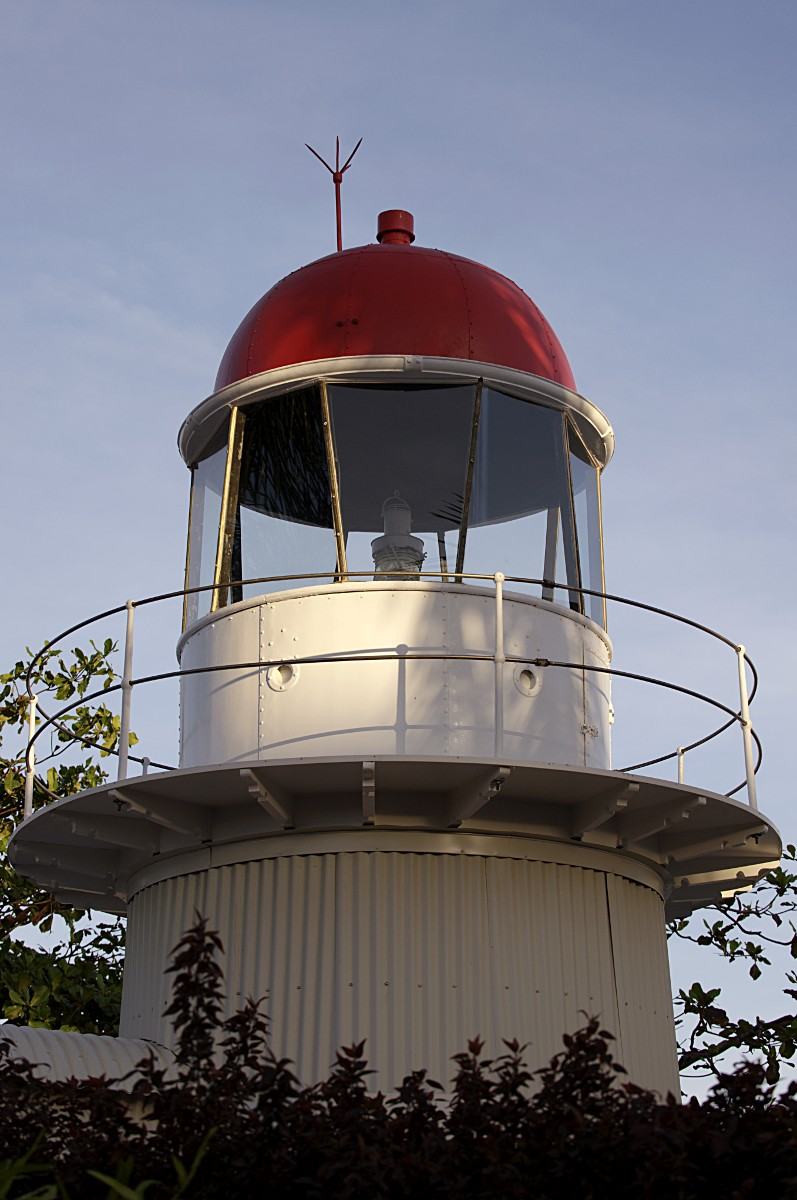
- Bay Rock Lighthouse at the Townsville Maritime Museum
- Location: Townsville; Queensland; Australia
- Coordinates: 19°15′33.18″S 146°49′26.31″E

Tower
- Constructed: 1886
- Construction: timber frame clad covered by corrugated iron
- Automated: 1920 (Note: There is some confusion about the year. Lighthouses of Australia Inc states "The last keeper left in 1920 and the light was automated in 1930." However, at a table above that, it is stated "Automated: 1920". An explanation made by Merson 2003 makes sense only if the light was automated in 1920, leaving some presence, and totally demanned in 1930.)
- Height: 8 metres (26 ft)
- Shape: cylindrical tower with balcony and lantern
- Markings: white tower and red lantern

Light
- Deactivated: 1980s (Note: According to Rowlett. Lighthouses of Australia Inc lists 1992, which is the year in which it was relocated according to Rowlett)
- Focal height: 29 metres (95 ft) (original location) (Note: Museum. Note that Lighthouses of Australia Inc mentions in the text "The original light stood 29 metres above ground", though it lists it as "Elevation", and the standard used by that source is that "Elevation" is measured above sea.)
- Lens: 4th Order dioptric

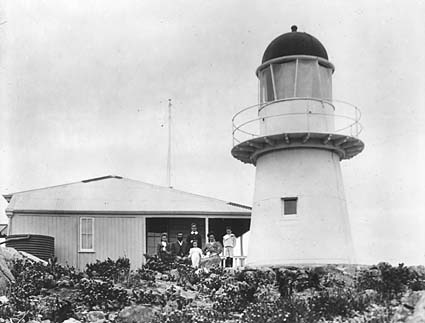
Bay Rock Light, 1917. The keeper's house can be seen on the left

Bay Rock Light is an inactive lighthouse which used to be located on Bay Rock, a rocky islet northwest of Magnetic Island, about 20 kilometres (12 mi) north of Townsville, Queensland, Australia. First lit in 1886, it was automated in 1920 and deactivated in the 1980s. It was relocated in 1992 to the Townsville Maritime Museum, where it is now displayed.

== History ==
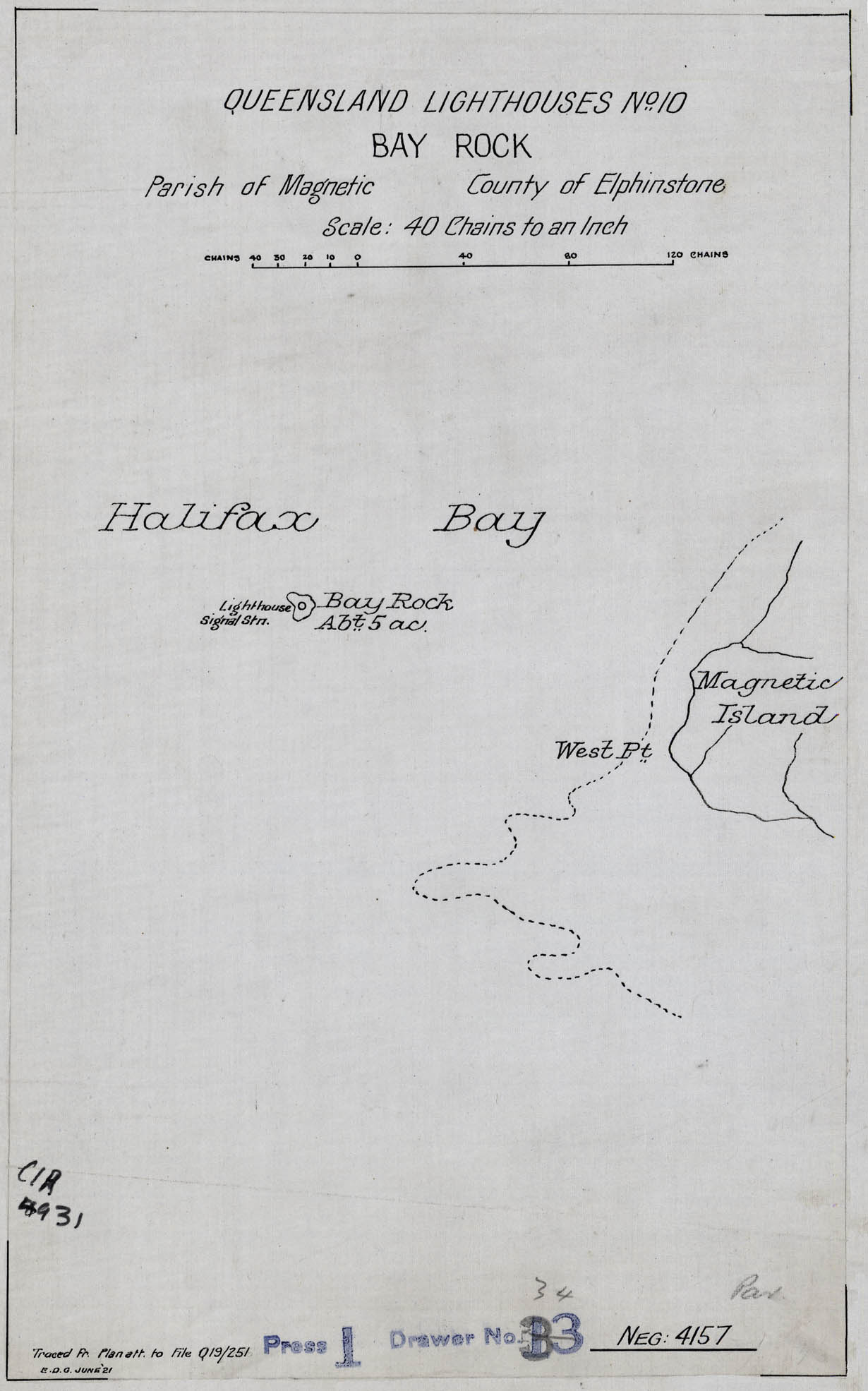
Chart of the original location of Bay Rock Light, chart made in 1921

Bay Rock Light was first lit in 1886. It was originally located on Bay Rock, at location 19°7′0″S 146°45′12″E, its main use being assisting vessels into a quarantine station on West Point, Magnetic Island. It also assisted passage into Cleveland Bay or to a main shipping anchorage off Bay Rock.

The lighthouse was 8 metres (26 ft) high, made of a timber frame clad with zinc-annealed galvanized corrugated iron sheets. It was the fourth in a group of eight lighthouses made of hardwood frame clad with corrugated iron, which included, by order of establishment Little Sea Hill Light, Grassy Hill Light, Goods Island Light, itself, Old Caloundra Light, North Point Hummock Light (demolished), Gatcombe Head Light (demolished) and Bulwer Island Light. The original light source was a Kerosene mantle with an intensity of 1,200 cd. Standing at an elevation of 29 metres (95 ft), it showed a characteristic of a group of red and white flashes every six seconds (Gr. W.R. 6s) which was visible for 14 nautical miles (26 km; 16 mi) for the white flashes and 7 nautical miles (13 km; 8.1 mi) for the red ones. The original lens was a 4th order dioptric.

The lighthouse was originally manned, and a small cottage accommodated the keeper and his family. The last keeper was John Albert Edward Lawson. In March 1920 John Lawson was lost at sea when a small fishing boat capsized. This led to the decision to automate the operation of the lighthouse, and it was demanned in 1920. The light was converted to an automatic acetylene gas burner (carbide lamp).

During the 1980s the lighthouse was deactivated and replaced with a small fiberglass beacon. The beacon has NGA number 111-10030 and Admiralty number K3117. It is still active, displaying a characteristic of two white flashes, every eight seconds (Fl.(2)W. 8s).

In 1992 the lighthouse was relocated to the Townsville Maritime Museum. The top of the lighthouse was transported with an emergency services helicopter. The lighthouse was restored by Queensland Transport, and officially opened to the public in September, 2003.

== Visiting ==
The Townsville Maritime Museum is located on the south side of Ross Creek, in Townsville. It is open daily, for a fee.

== See also ==
- List of lighthouses in Australia

== Bibliography ==
- List of Lights, Pub. 111: The West Coasts of North and South America (Excluding Continental U.S.A. and Hawaii), Australia, Tasmania, New Zealand, and the Islands of the North and South Pacific Oceans (PDF). List of Lights. United States National Geospatial-Intelligence Agency. 2009. p. 198.
- Rowlett, Russ. "Lighthouses of Australia: Southern Queensland". The Lighthouse Directory. University of North Carolina at Chapel Hill.
- "The Bay Rock Lighthouse". Lighthouses of Queensland. Lighthouses of Australia Inc.
- "The Bay Rock Light House - Maritime Museum of Townsville". townsvillemaritimemuseum.org.au. Archived from the original on 29 November 2010.
- Merson, Steve (April 2003). "Bay Rock Lighthouse, Qld". Lighthouses of Australia Inc Bulletin (2). Archived from the original on 3 November 2010.
