= BS 8414 =

BS 8414 is a 2002 British Standard describing test methods to assess fire safety of cladding applied to the external face of a building. The latest version was issued in 2020.

The two-part standard describes methods for testing the cladding in two different setups, and has been ported to standards in countries such as Australia, Malaysia and the UAE.

== Standard ==
=== Current ===
- BS 8414-1:2015+A1:2017 Fire performance of external cladding systems. Test method for non-loadbearing external cladding systems applied to the masonry face of a building. Published on 30/04/2015
- BS 8414-2:2015+A1:2017 Fire performance of external cladding systems. Test method for non-loadbearing external cladding systems fixed to and supported by a structural steel frame. Published on 30/04/2015
