= Sea Hill Light =

Lighthouse in Queensland, Australia

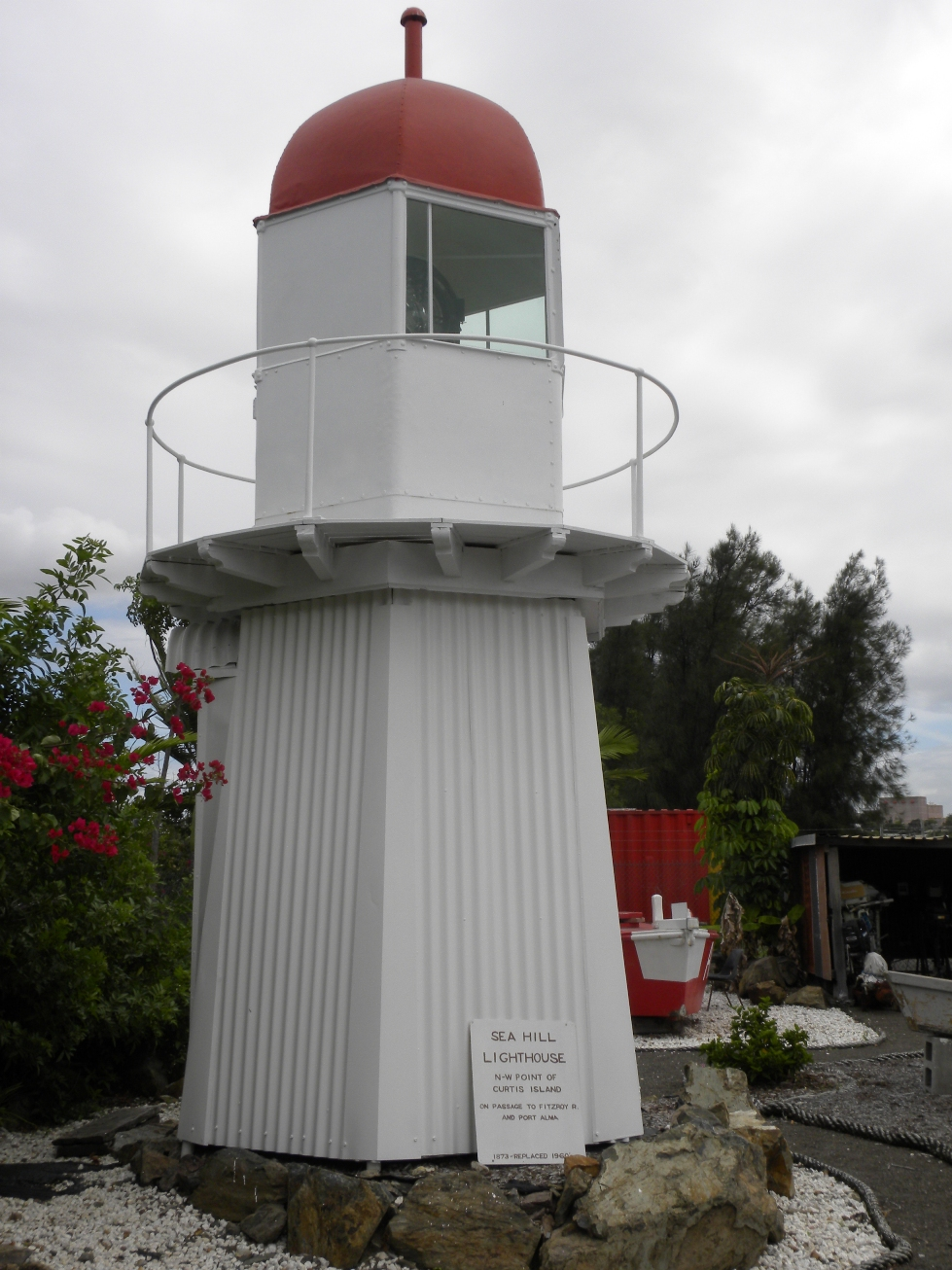
- The Little Sea Hill Lighthouse in Gladstone Maritime Museum
- Location: Curtis Island, Queensland, Australia
- Coordinates: 23°29′27.35″S 150°58′49.49″E

Tower
- Constructed: 1873 or 1876
- Heritage: listed on the Queensland Heritage Register

Light
- First lit: 1920s
- Deactivated: 2006
- Characteristic: Fl(2) W 6s

Sea Hill Light was a lighthouse which was located on the northwest point of Curtis Island, Queensland, Australia. Its purpose was to mark the east side of the entrance to Keppel Bay, on passage to Fitzroy River and Port Alma. The first lighthouse at the locations, also known as Little Sea Hill Light, was constructed in 1873 or 1876, moved in the 1920s, and is now on display at the Gladstone Maritime Museum. A second lighthouse was constructed in the 1920s, deactivated in 2006 and demolished in early 2009.

== History ==
=== First lighthouse ===
The first lighthouse, constructed in 1873 or 1876, was the first in Queensland of a its design, made of hardwood frame clad with corrugated iron. This design was then used in seven more lighthouses, by order of establishment, Grassy Hill Light, Goods Island Light, Bay Rock Light, Old Caloundra Light, North Point Hummock Light, Gatcombe Head Light and Bulwer Island Light. In the 1920s, the lighthouse was relocated to Station Point, about 6 kilometres (3.7 mi) northeast. It stood there until it was deactivated in the 1960s and then sold into private hands. It is currently on display at the Gladstone Maritime Museum at 23°50′4″S 151°15′37″E.

As the name Little Sea Hill Light suggests, the lighthouse is rather short, only 20 feet (6.1 m) in height. Unlike the other seven lighthouses of the corrugated iron cladding design, it is of square form, rather than a round one. A gallery and a lantern top the tower, and much like other Queensland lighthouses, it is painted white with a red dome.

=== Second lighthouse ===
The second lighthouse, a 43 feet (13 m) high corrugated iron tower with lantern and gallery, was constructed in the 1920s to replace the first lighthouse. A pilot station was originally located at the premises, and was closed in 1963. In 2006 the lighthouse was deactivated, and in early 2009 it was demolished.

The station was not completely abandoned. The 2010 List of Lights lists a light at the location, 7 feet (2.1 m) high with a focal plane of 39 feet (12 m), displaying a light characteristic of two white flashes every six seconds (Fl.(2)W. 6s). This is most likely a new fiberglass beacon.

== See also ==
- List of lighthouses in Australia
