= Grassy Hill Light =

Lighthouse in Queensland, Australia

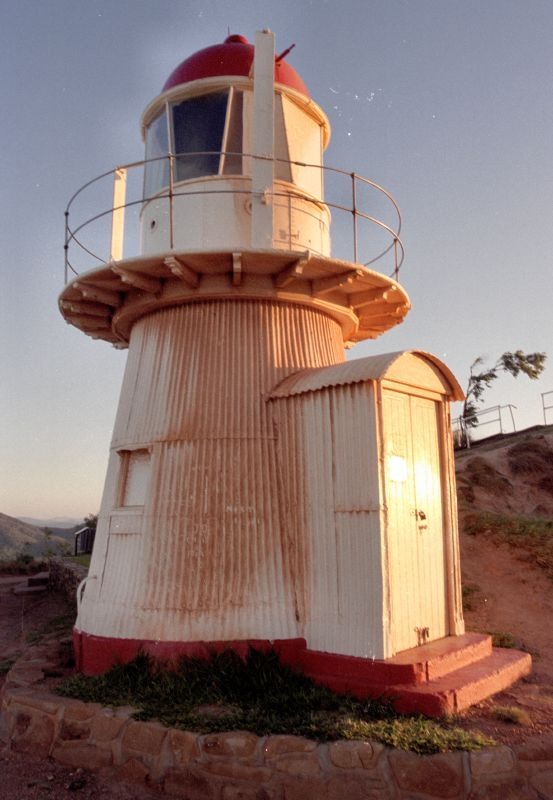
- Grassy Hill Light, 2005
- Location: Cooktown; Queensland; Australia
- Coordinates: 15°27′39.00″S 145°15′19.1″E

Tower
- Foundation: concrete tower
- Construction: timber frame clad with corrugated iron
- Automated: 1927
- Height: 20 feet (6.1 m)
- Shape: cylindrical tower with balcony and lantern
- Markings: white tower, red lantern dome
- Power source: mains electricity
- Operator: Australian Maritime Safety Authority
- Heritage: listed on the Queensland Heritage Register

Light
- First lit: 1886
- Focal height: 530 feet (160 m)
- Lens: 4th Order Chance Bros Dioptric
- Range: 9 nautical miles (17 km; 10 mi)
- Characteristic: Fl (2) W 6s.

Grassy Hill Light, also known as Cooktown Light, is an active lighthouse located on Grassy Hill above Cooktown, Queensland, Australia, on the south side of the entrance to Endeavour River.

== History ==
Grassy Hill was the site of Lieutenant James Cook landing in 1770. Cooktown was established in October 1873 to accommodate for the Palmer River Gold Rush, and became a thriving port in the 1880s. The first lights in and out of the port were leading lights set on sheds on the wharves. A signal staff was erected on Grassy Hill in 1874 to announce incoming ships, and a cottage was constructed for the signal staff operator in 1878–79. By 1882 a temporary light was set on the hill. In 1883 and 1884, George Poynter Heath, Portmaster of Queensland and Chairman of the Queensland Marine Board at that time, made two reports to the parliament, recommending that the temporary light be replaced with a permanent building and a proper apparatus.

Grassy Hill Light was finally constructed in 1886. It was the second in a group of eight lighthouses in Queensland made of hardwood frame clad with corrugated iron, which includes, by order of establishment Little Sea Hill Light, itself, Goods Island Light, Bay Rock Light, Old Caloundra Light, North Point Hummock Light (demolished), Gatcombe Head Light (demolished) and Bulwer Island Light. The apparatus was a 4th Order fixed Chance Bros Dioptric apparatus, and Heath himself supervised its installation in September 1886. The light source was a kerosene lamp. The light keeper resided in the existing cottage and also maintained a signal staff.

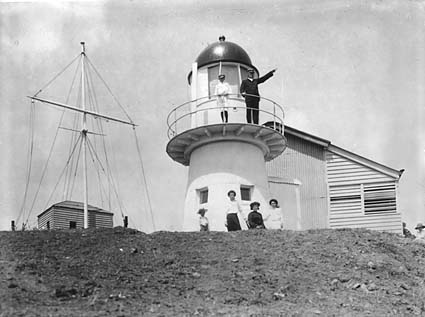
Grassy Hill Light, 1917. The flag pole and the residence are also visible

In 1900 a new cottage was constructed for the light keeper. In 1912 a report recommended that the lighthouse be automated, leaving the keeper only the signal duties. However, this recommendation was not to be taken for some time. In 1913 a wireless station was installed nearby and in 1915 the light, alone with all other coastal lights, was transferred to the control of the Commonwealth government. It was only in 1927 the lighthouse was finally automated, the light source was changed to an acetylene gas burner, and the station was demanned. The keeper's house and signal staff were destroyed about that time.

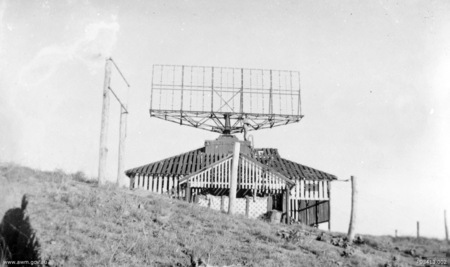
Front entrance of the radar shack and imitation lighthouse keeper's cottage

During World War II, from early 1942 to February 1945, a radar station was operated by the 56 Radar Unit, RAAF near the lighthouse. An imitation lighthouse keeper's cottage was constructed for camouflage purposes, and the defensive installations surrounded the station. All structures were removed after the war.

In 1970 a sandstone cairn was placed at the summit of the hill to commemorate the bi-centenary of Cook's survey from the summit.

Control of the lighthouse remained in the hands of the Commonwealth until November 1987, when it was transferred back to the Queensland government, with the Department of Transport operating the light, Cook Shire Council as trustees for the reserve, and local volunteers maintaining the tower.

In 1993 the lighthouse was converted to solar power.

== Structure ==
The lighthouse is conical in form, about 6 metres (20 ft) high, constructed of timber clad with corrugated iron sheets, on a concrete base. It is about 3 metres (9.8 ft) diameter at the base. Small rectangular windows are set about mid-height on the south and east sides. Entrance is through a small entry on the western side, with timber-framing, convex corrugated iron roof, and timber double doors. The tower is topped by a balcony supported on timber brackets which has a lightweight balustrade. The cylindrical lantern sits above, capped with a hemispherical dome. Access to the light is via a timber stair. The tower is painted white, with the dome and the concrete base painted red.

== Display ==
The light characteristic shown is two white flashes every six seconds (Fl.(2)W. 6s). It is visible only on a limited sector, 192°-315°, and obscured elsewhere.

== Operation and access ==
The site is managed by the Cook Shire Council. It is accessible by road and parking is also provided. The tower is, however, closed to the public.

== See also ==
- List of lighthouses in Australia
