= Goods Island Light =

Lighthouse in Australia

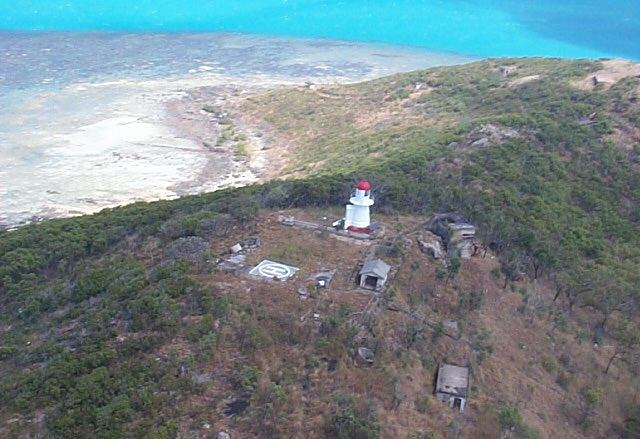
- An aerial view of Goods Island Lightstation, 1999
- Location: Goods Island; Queensland; Australia
- Coordinates: 10°33′54.6″S 142°09′07.08″E

Tower
- Constructed: 1886
- Foundation: concrete tower
- Construction: timber frame clad with corrugated iron
- Automated: 1973
- Height: 18 feet (5.5 m)
- Shape: cylindrical tower with balcony and lantern
- Markings: white tower, red lantern dome
- Power source: solar power
- Operator: Australian Maritime Safety Authority
- Heritage: listed on the Commonwealth Heritage List

Light
- Focal height: 345 feet (105 m)
- Lens: 4th Order dioptric
- Range: 11 nautical miles (20 km; 13 mi)
- Characteristic: Q W

Goods Island Light is an active lighthouse located on the highest point of Goods Island (Palilag), an island in the Torres Strait, belonging to Queensland, Australia. It serves as the rear light of the Goods Island Range, pointing out the entrance to Normanby Sound.

== History ==
The first navigation aid on Goods Island was a signalling station, established in 1877. In 1882, pearl fishers operating in Torres Strait requested that a light be established at the western entrance to the straight. Their request was accepted by George Heath, chairman of the Queensland Marine Board, who dictated the location of Goods Island. A temporary light installed on the signalman's quarters was finally replaced by the lighthouse, constructed in 1886. It was the third in a group of eight lighthouses in Queensland made of hardwood timmber framing clad with corrugated iron, which includes, in order of establishment Little Sea Hill Light, Grassy Hill Light, itself, Bay Rock Light, Old Caloundra Light, North Point Hummock Light (demolished), Gatcombe Head Light (demolished) and Bulwer Island Light. The lighthouse was constructed entirely by government workers, rather than a private contractor, and it is believed to be unique in this sense among Queensland lighthouses. The original apparatus was a fourth order dioptric with a totally reflecting glass mirror.

In 1894 telegraphic communication with Thursday Island was established. Following the Federation of Australia, the station was transferred to the hands of the Commonwealth of Australia.

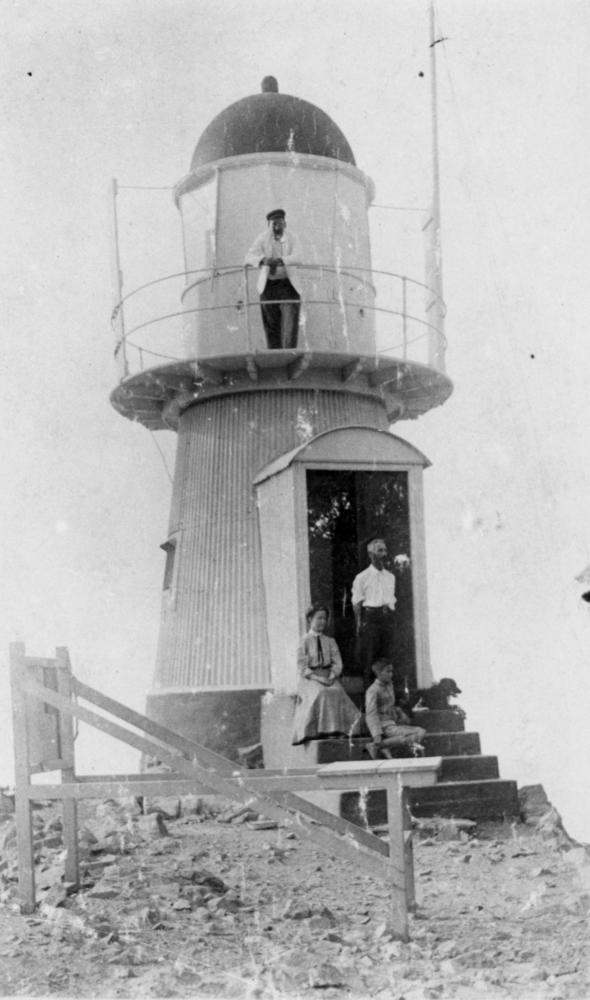
Goods Island Light, ca. 1909

During World War II the island was taken over by the Royal Australian Navy which constructed defensive batteries around the island.

In 1973 the lighthouse was automated. In 1988 it was transferred to solar power.

== Structure ==
The lighthouse is about 18-foot (5.5 m) high. It is conical in shape, made of hardwood frame clad with white painted corrugated iron. It is topped by a red zinc dome. Access to the tower is through concrete steps and a small corrugated iron entryway with a convex corrugated iron roof.

Also part of the station is the front light, a 7 feet (2.1 m) white hut on a rock platform below. The lighthouse is located 505 meters at 199° from this front light.

Also in the premises are a timber storage shed a timber fibro-cement clad lighthouse keeper's cottage, now in ruins. Both of them are white with green painted galvanized iron roofs.

== Display ==
The light characteristic shown is a quick-flashing white light (Q.W.), visible 064°-238° and 290°-295° for 11 nautical miles (20 km; 13 mi).

The front light shows white and red flashes every two and a half seconds (Fl.W.R. 2.5s). The red flashes are visible 085°-180° for 7 nautical miles (13 km; 8.1 mi). The white flashes are visible at 180°-085° for 10 nautical miles (19 km; 12 mi). The front light is obscured by Hammond Island and by Goods Islands itself.

== Operation and access ==
The site and the light are managed and operated by the Australian Maritime Safety Authority. The island is accessible only by boat or helicopter, and both the site and the tower are closed to the public.

== See also ==
- List of lighthouses in Australia
