= Centre for Window and Cladding Technology =

- Formation: 1989
- Purpose: Advocacy group Lobbying
- Location: Bath, Somerset
- Products: Building materials Construction
- Website: cwct.co.uk

The Centre for Window and Cladding Technology (CWCT) is a publisher of standards and guidance only (not regulations), on corrosion, intrusion, fenestration, weather and fire resistance, acoustic and impact performance, of building envelopes, facades, cladding and glazing. Founded in 1989 and based in Bath, Somerset, the CWCT provides training and courses, hosts international events, conferences, seminars and is recognised by over 330 member companies within the construction industry.

== Guidance on Fire Performance of façade cladding ==
TN98 (supersedes previous technical note TN73) Guidance for the fire performance of facades (including cladding) and suggests that any buildings with compartmented floors will limit spread of fire, thus affecting the design of interface points where the compartment floors meet the façade. Therefore, both of those components must be considered together, not in isolation. Fire resisting construction discourages the use of combustible materials in cladding to minimize the spread of fire, together with insisting adequate fire barriers are employed within building cavities. The specific fire strategy for the building, will be set out by the fire engineer including the requirements for the façade cladding. The fire performance of the cladding and façade should form a key part of the early in the design process and fire strategy. Clearly the fire regulations specified here fall short of any requirement to state life saving requirements of fire spread by external cladding, cladding specification is entirely dependent on type of building construction combined with fire strategy dictated by the local fire officer, all is very ambiguous and clearly needs some serious changes to effect a fire resistant building, only apparent since the Grenfell Tower fire.

== Documents published by the CWCT ==
- Windows with enhanced resistance to intrusion 1994
- Guide to good practice for facades 1996
- Guide to the selection and testing of stone panels for external use 1997
- Performance and testing of fixings for thin stone cladding 1999
- Standard for systemised building envelopes 2006
- TN 7 Threat resistant fenestration 2000
- TN 8 Selection of windows - a checklist for specifiers 2000
- TN 17 Weathertightness and drainage 2000
- TN 24 Corrosion 2000
- TN 38 Acoustic performance of windows 2003
- TN 39 Sound transmission through building envelopes 2003
- TN 41 Site testing for watertightness 2004
- TN 52 Impact performance of cladding 2006
- TN 53 Method statements for the construction of building envelopes 2009
- TN 61 Glass types 2009
- TN 66 Safety and fragility of glazed roofing: guidance on specification 2010
- TN 67 Safety and fragility of glazed roofing: testing and assessment 2010
- TN 71 Standards and performance classification of windows and doors 2011
- TN 72 External shading devices 2011
- TU 15 Replacement of British Structural design codes by Eurocodes 2011
- TN 75 Impact performance of building envelopes: guidance on specification 2012
- TN 76 Impact performance of building envelopes: method for impact testing of cladding panels 2012
- TN 77 Assessment and certification of rainscreen systems 2012
- TN 78 Interfaces and joints - introduction 2012
- TN 96 Assessing cradle and suspended access equipment loads 2016
- TN 97 Selection of access equipment for façade maintenance 2016 .
- TN98 Fire performance of facades - UK Building Regulations- (supersedes TN73) 2017.
