= Bulwer Island Light =

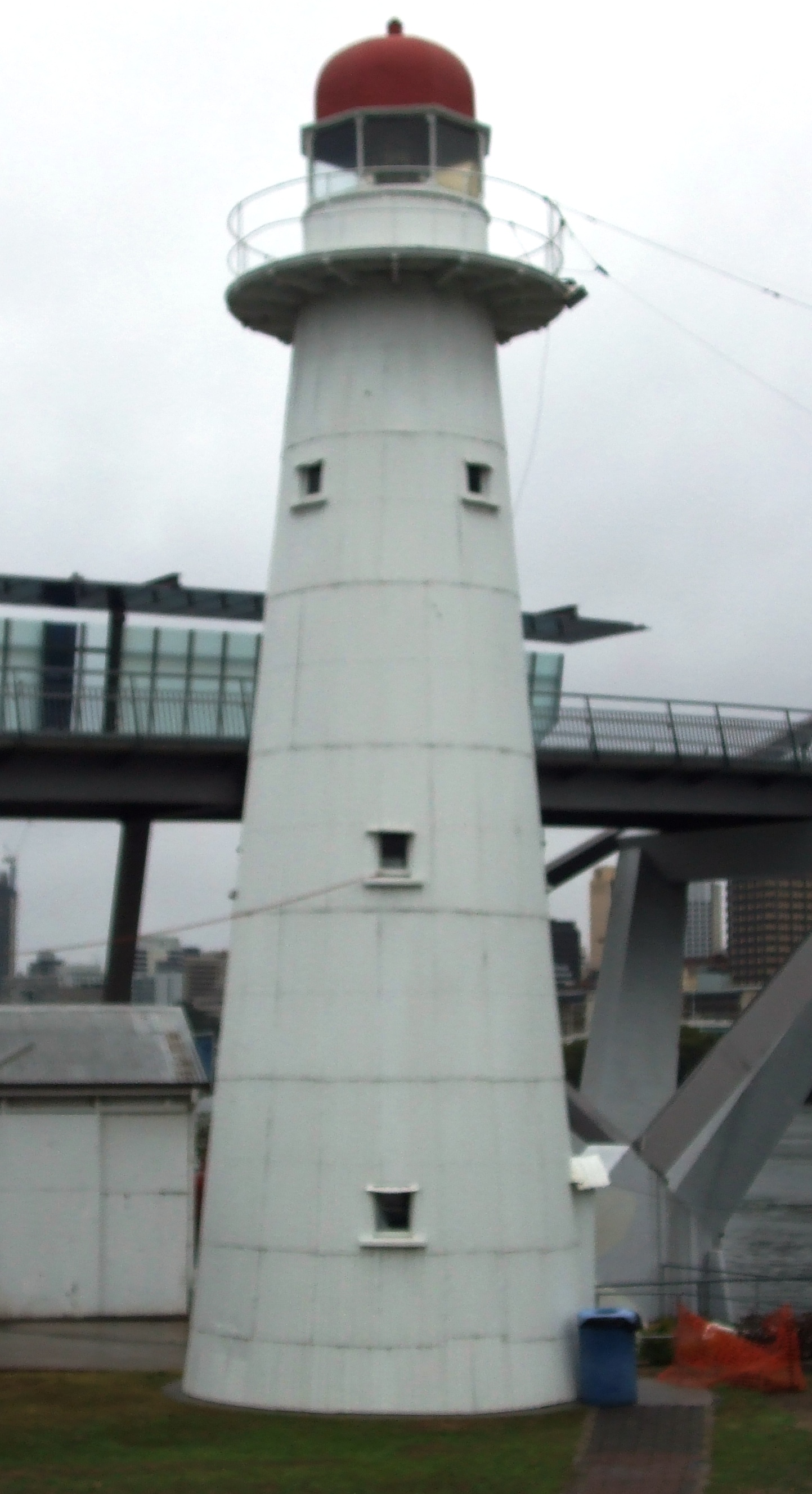
- Bulwer Island Lighthouse, at the Queensland Maritime Museum
- Location: Brisbane; Queensland; Australia
- Coordinates: 27.48158°S 153.02662°E

Tower
- Constructed: 1909
- Construction: timber-framed clad covered by corrugated iron
- Height: 52 feet (16 m)
- Shape: cylindrical tower with balcony and lantern
- Markings: white tower, red lantern dome
- Operator: Queensland Maritime Museum

Light
- First lit: 1912
- Deactivated: 1983

Bulwer Island Light, also known as Bulwer Island Range Rear Light, is an inactive lighthouse that was on Bulwer Island, in the suburb of Pinkenba, City of Brisbane, Queensland, Australia. In 1983, it was moved to the Queensland Maritime Museum in South Brisbane.

== History ==
The station was established in 1909. The current light was lit in 1912, as the rear light of a pair of leading lights at the mouth of Brisbane River. It was at the northern end of Bulwer Island on the eastern side directly adjacent to the river (27.39462°S 153.15032°E). Made of hardwood timber framing clad with corrugated iron, it was the eight and last of its kind to be constructed, the first seven being Little Sea Hill Light, Grassy Hill Light, Goods Island Light, Bay Rock Light, Old Caloundra Head Light, North Point Hummock Light (demolished) and Gatcombe Head Light (demolished). In 1983 the lighthouse was replaced by a skeletal tower, and relocated to the Queensland Maritime Museum. The original location was adjacent to the Bulwer Island oil refinery.

The tower went through restoration in 2005, replacing timber and rotted windowsills. The ground level cover was also painted, and access was improved.

== Visiting ==
The Queensland Maritime Museum is located on the southern bank of the Brisbane River just south of the South Bank Parklands precinct of Brisbane, and close to the Goodwill Bridge. The museum is open daily and the ground level of the lighthouse is open to visitors.

== See also ==
- List of lighthouses in Australia
