= Old Caloundra Light =

Inactive lighthouse

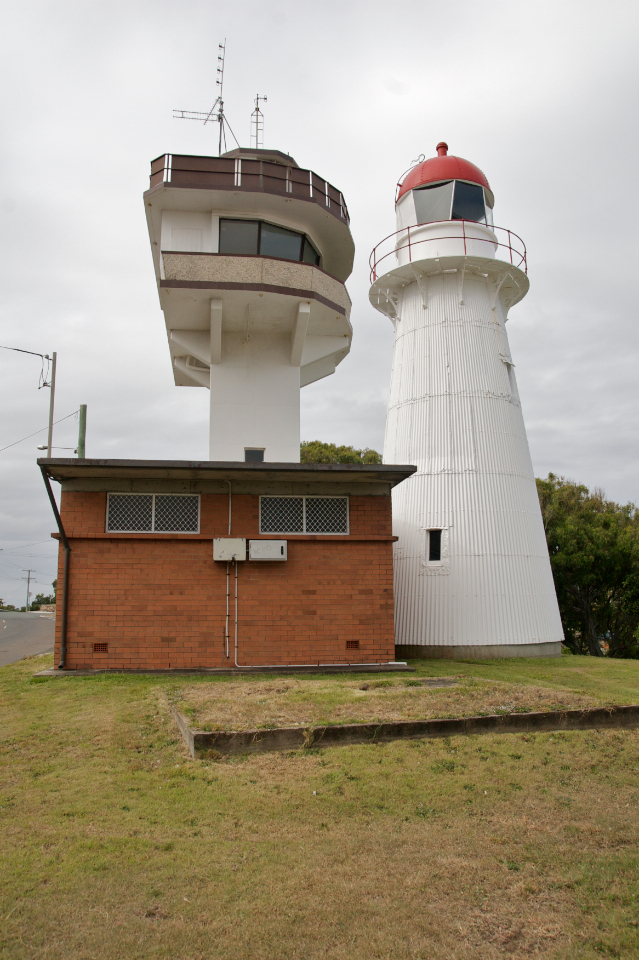
- Old Caloundra Light on the right, New Caloundra Light on the left, 2008
- Location: Caloundra; Queensland; Australia
- Coordinates: 26°48′05.91″S 153°08′14.8″E

Tower
- Constructed: 1896
- Construction: timber frame clad with corrugated iron
- Automated: 1942
- Height: 39 feet (12 m)
- Shape: conical tower with balcony and lantern
- Markings: white tower, red lantern dome
- Power source: mains electricity
- Heritage: listed on the Queensland Heritage Register

Light
- Deactivated: 1968
- Focal height: 52 feet (16 m)
- Lens: fourth order Chance Brothers dioptric
- Range: 19 nautical miles (35 km; 22 mi)

Old Caloundra Light, also known as Old Caloundra Head Light or Cape Caloundra Light, is an inactive lighthouse located in Caloundra on the Sunshine Coast in South East Queensland, Australia. It is the oldest surviving building in Caloundra. The lighthouse was active between 1896 and 1968. The tower was relocated twice. In 1970 it was relocated from its original location to Woorim Park in Caloundra, and in 1999 it was returned to its original site on Canberra Terrace near downtown Caloundra, where it stands today.

== History ==
=== Operation ===
The need for a lighthouse at Caloundra Head arose in 1879 with the sounding of the North West Channel, a deep water channel into Moreton Bay and the Port of Brisbane, the principal port of Queensland. The channel went from Caloundra Head along the eastern shore of Bribie Island. Although the channel became the most used entry channel into the port, it was only lit in 1896, when a pair of mobile leading lights were established on Bribie Island, the Caloundra Head Light was constructed. Tenders were called in 1896, and the stations were constructed by day labor. Materials for construction were shipped by barge from Brisbane. The lighthouse was the fifth in a group of eight lighthouses of its type, made of hardwood frame clad with corrugated iron, which included, by order of establishment Little Sea Hill Light, Grassy Hill Light, Goods Island Light, Bay Rock Light, itself, North Point Hummock Light (demolished), Gatcombe Head Light (demolished) and Bulwer Island Light. Though the main purpose of the light was to mark the entrance to the North West Channel it also served as a harbour light.

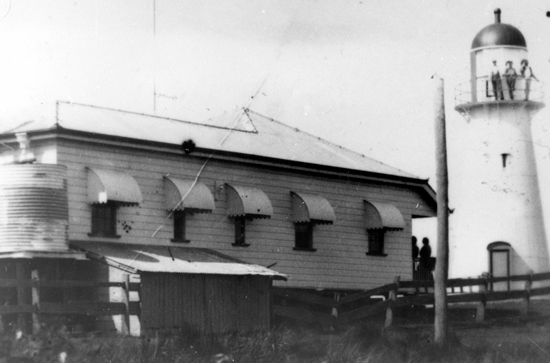
Lighthouse and keeper's residence, ca. 1920

The light was officially lit in September 1896. The original lens was a fourth order Chance Brothers dioptric apparatus, and the original light source was a fixed kerosene lamp. It was attended by a single lighthouse keeper, living in a cottage constructed next to the light. The keeper's house also served as a postal office with telegraph service, and the lightkeeper also served as the telegraph office keeper. The telegraph service was discontinued in 1910, but telephone service was installed in 1912, so the post office remained at the site until 1934. The keeper's cottage also hosted the first Caloundra for a few months.

In 1910 the apparatus was upgraded to an incandescent vapour kerosene lamp, also purchased from Chance Brothers, the first of its type in Queensland. Its intensity was 1,400 cd and it was visible for at least 22–25 nautical miles (41–46 km; 25–29 mi). By the 1930s the channel became even more popular and the lighthouse became a symbol of Caloundra, being used on maps, postcards and other promotional material.

During World War II the lighthouse was controlled by the Royal Australian Navy which also set up an observation post within the grounds. In 1942 it was converted to electricity from the mains with a petrol operated engine–generator as a backup. The lighthouse was automated and demanned and the cottage was occupied by the coastal artillery forces, which also attended the light.

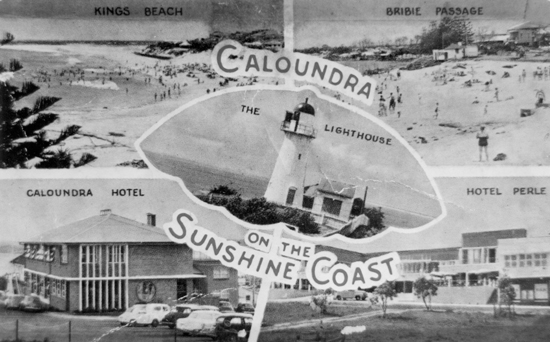
1950s postcard promoting Caloundra

After the war, the light remained unmanned, being connected to Brisbane by phone and attended from there. However, the connection to the mains proved quite unreliable, and a local, Charlie Bigg, was later engaged to attend the light from his nearby residence. The keeper's cottage was sold and moved down the hill in 1946. By 1950 the nearby ground was opened as a public park and the lighthouse was fenced off. The lighthouse's image continued to be used on promotional material as well crests and logos of local establishments.

Changes in the shipping industry in the 1960s caused an increase in large container ships, which made the channel even more important. In May 1966 permission was granted for the construction of New Caloundra Light, a modern structure comprising a combined lighthouse, signal station and radar station. It was erected in 1967 right next to the old lighthouse. By 1968 it became fully operational and the old lighthouse was deactivated.

The lighthouse's last active power source was a 500 Watt 110 Volt Philips lamp, fed by the Mains electricity. It showed a white light, with red showing in a sector. Having an intensity of 250,000 cd the white light was visible for 19 nautical miles (35 km; 22 mi) while the red one was visible for 9 nautical miles (17 km; 10 mi). The light was shown at a focal height of 52 metres (171 ft).

=== After deactivation ===
The lighthouse remained at location until 1970 under constant threats of demolition. In 1970 volunteers from the Golden Beach Power Boat Club relocated it to Woorim Park, near their clubhouse. As funds for preservation were not provided, the tower continued deteriorating, the iron cladding rusted, and water leaking weakened the timber frames. At some point, the lighthouse was concrete rendered to seal it, but deterioration continued.

In the late 1990s, it became apparent that the tower's integrity was threatened. In order to get the tower funded it needed to be registered by the Queensland Heritage Register, but as it was not in its original location it was not eligible. As the new lighthouse was deactivated in 1992, relocating the lighthouse back to its original location became an option. After a two-year campaign by local residents and the Caloundra City Council, a lease on the original location was obtained and A$50,000 were granted by the council to facilitate the relocation. However, a relocation attempt made on 22 March 1999 was almost disastrous. Though the lantern was successfully detached, as the tower was lifted about a metre off the ground a section below the first floor broke away due to the brittleness of the timber studs and the lighthouse fell to the ground. As the move was insured, the lighthouse could be saved. The tower was subsequently braced and repaired, and on 11 June it was transported successfully to its original location, where a new base has been built over the original one. Later that year the tower and the lantern were then restored, and the lantern was placed back on the tower. It took more than a year to get the official certifications to open the lighthouse to the public, and the public open day was held on 31 March 2001.

The lighthouse's lease was held by the Caloundra City Council, which licensed it to the Lions Club of Caloundra and later to the Friends of the Caloundra Lighthouses Inc (which was established in 2007) until it expired in 2009. It was licensed to the Sunshine Coast Regional Council in 2010. As of early 2011, the Friends regained access to the buildings. By August 2012 they had readied the buildings for public visitation and signed a three-year licence with the Sunshine Coast Council.

== Structure ==
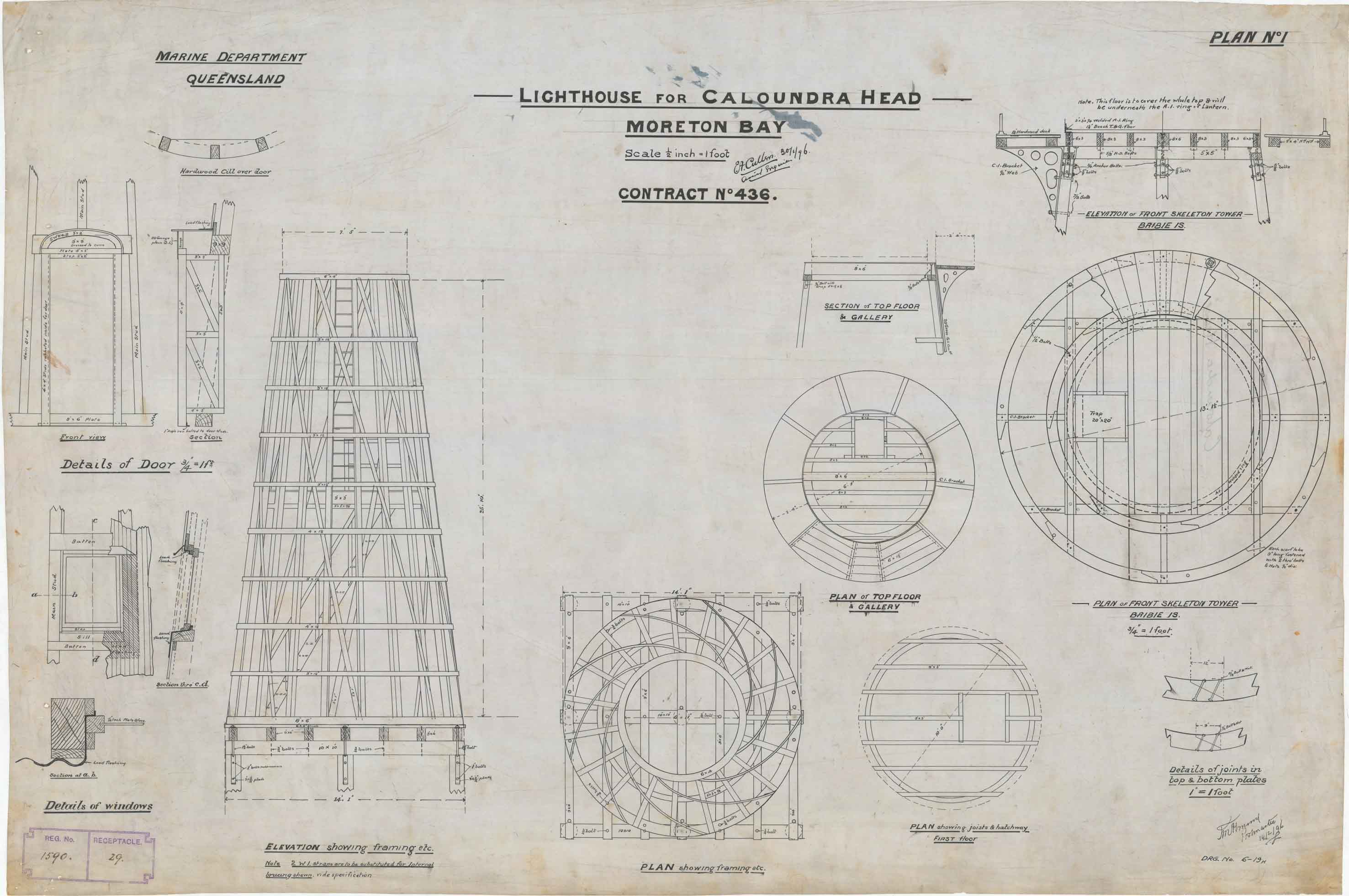
Lighthouse plans, 1896

The 11.5 metres (38 ft) tower construction is typical to Queensland lighthouses of the time. It is built of a hardwood frame and clad with corrugated zinc annealed iron. It is conical in form. The diameter at the based is 4.3 metres (14 ft), tapering to 2.26 metres (7 ft 5 in) at the top. The base of the tower is a round concrete slab placed over the original footing in the 1999 relocation. The entrance is through the northern side, through a small wooden framed entry with an arched corrugated iron roof. The tower also has four small rectangular windows, two at ground level and two at the middle. Inside the tower are two platforms, accessed by two flight of stepladder and hatchways in the floors. The tower exterior is painted white, with a red border on the entry door.

The tower is topped by the renovated metal lantern room, accessed via a lead-lined hatchway in the floor. The base of the lantern room is made of steel plates, and a hatch door allows access to the gallery. The lantern room is domed, and the dome exterior is painted red and topped with a ventilator cowl. The gallery floor is timber, supported by cast-iron brackets, and surrounded by a red painted lightweight tubular balustrade. A pedestal for the lens was installed in the lantern room, though the lens was removed.

== Site operation and visiting ==
The site of the lighthouse is accessible. The tower itself was open to visitors and guided tours were offered until 2009, when the lease expired. As of early 2011, the plans are to have both the old and the new lighthouses open to the public later in 2011. As of August 2012, the lighthouse can be visited.

== See also ==
- List of lighthouses in Australia
