= Cladding (construction) =

Layer of one material over another

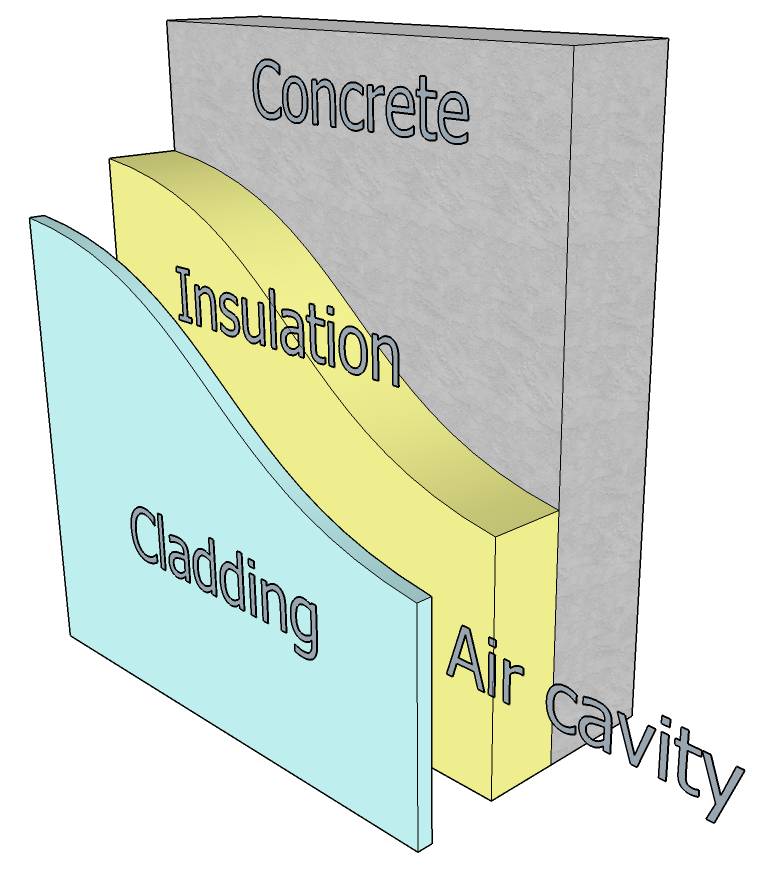
An example of cladding

Cladding is the application of one material over another to provide a skin or layer. In construction, cladding is used to provide a degree of thermal insulation and weather resistance, and to improve the appearance of buildings. Cladding can be made of any of a wide range of materials including wood, metal, brick, vinyl, and composite materials that can include aluminium, wood, blends of cement and recycled polystyrene, wheat/rice straw fibres. Rainscreen cladding is a form of weather cladding designed to protect against the elements, but also offers thermal insulation. The cladding does not itself need to be waterproof, merely a control element: it may serve only to direct water or wind safely away in order to control run-off and prevent its infiltration into the building structure. Cladding may also be a control element for noise, either entering or escaping. Cladding can become a fire risk by design or material.

== Description ==
Cladding in construction is material applied over another to provide a skin or layer and used to provide a degree of thermal insulation and weather resistance, and to improve the appearance of buildings. Between the cladding and the wall there is a cavity where rain can run down.

== Design ==
=== Materials ===
Cladding can be made of any of a wide range of materials including wood, metal, brick, vinyl, and composite materials that can include aluminium, wood, blends of cement and recycled polystyrene, or wheat/rice straw fibres. Materials used for cladding affect vulnerability to fire.

=== Purposes ===
Rainscreen cladding is a form of weather cladding designed to protect against the elements, but also offers thermal insulation. The cladding does not need, itself, to be waterproof, merely a control element: it may serve only to direct water or wind safely away in order to control run-off and prevent its infiltration into the building structure.

Single-skin metal panels are pre-formed wall panels made from metal that are one of the most commonly available types of cladding for industrial and commercial projects. Their high durability and easy installation make them ideal for low maintenance builds.

Cladding may also be a control element for noise, either entering or escaping.

Cladding applied to windows is often referred to as window capping and is a specialized field.

== Vulnerability to building fires ==
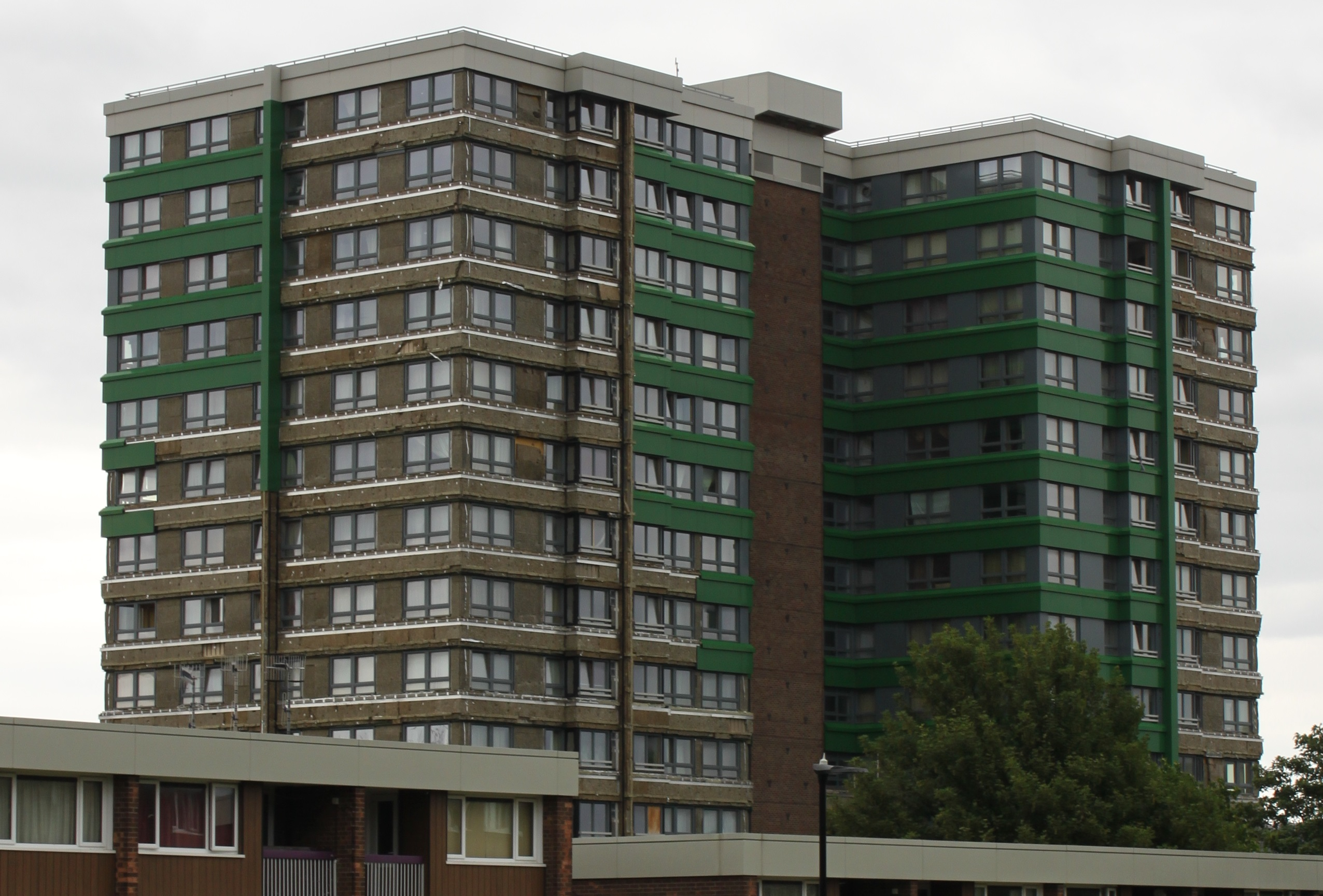
Hanover House, a residential tower block in Sheffield, with its cladding partially removed after failing fire safety tests following the Grenfell Tower fire

Between the cladding and the wall there is a cavity where rain can run down. In the event of a fire this draws hot air up like a chimney, intensifies the fire, and spreads it to the top of the clad area. The fire can then get inside the building through open windows, for example to curtains blowing through windows.

In addition to the chimney effect, the cladding material itself can contribute to a fire. Brick has excellent fire resistance; planks or weatherboards made from fibre cement or steel have high fire resistance; aluminium and reconstituted timber products have good fire resistance, and timber weatherboards and plywood sheets have poor fire resistance. Composite cladding typically consists of panels 3–5 millimetres (0.12–0.20 in) thick made of a core material sandwiched between two aluminium faces. The core material may be polyethylene (which is combustible), a mineral-based material, or a combination of both. Panels of the same appearance may have different core materials; those with a higher proportion of mineral core withstand fire better, but can still be considered combustible. Fire will be spread by the cladding if the core is combustible.

In the wake of the Grenfell Tower fire in London, and similar fires in France, Dubai, and elsewhere, great attention has been paid to the fire protection qualities of cladding used in tower-blocks and similar high-rise multiple-occupancy housing and, in particular, the use of aluminium composite material (ACM) and ACM panels (ACP). Grenfell Tower was clad with composite panels with a polyethylene core which contributed to the fire; these panels cost about £2 less than ones with incombustible core. There are estimated to be about 600 high-rise blocks of flats in the UK that have "similar" cladding and some fire safety tests—not full BS 8414 tests—were carried out on panels; of the first 75 tested, 100% failed.

== See also ==
- Siding
- Stone cladding
- Centre for Window and Cladding Technology
- Yakisugi
- Metal cladding
- Brick veneer cladding
